= List of University of Tasmania people =

This is an incomplete list of University of Tasmania people, including alumni and staff.

== Alumni ==
=== Academia ===
- Ed Byrne, Principal of King's College London
- Peter Conrad, literary academic and author
- Rodney Croome, AM, academic and LGBT rights activist
- Peter Forrest, philosopher
- Marnie Hughes-Warrington, Deputy Vice-Chancellor of the Australian National University
- Jeff Malpas, philosopher
- Nigel Roberts (political scientist) - academic at Victoria University of Wellington in New Zealand
- Michael Tate, AO, Catholic priest, legal scholar and former Labor politician
- Helen Tiffin, post-colonial theorist

=== Business ===
- Andrew MacLeod, businessman, author, former humanitarian lawyer and aid worker
- Capt. Mohamed Juma Al Shamisi, CEO of Abu Dhabi Ports
- Saul Eslake, economist

=== Government ===
==== Vice-Regal ====
- Stanley Burbury, past Governor of Tasmania
- William Cox, past Governor of Tasmania
- Sir Guy Green, past Governor of Tasmania
- Peter Underwood, past Governor of Tasmania
- Kate Warner, AM, legal academic and current Governor of Tasmania

==== Politics ====
===== Federal politicians =====
- Eric Abetz, Liberal politician
- Neal Blewett AC, former Labor politician
- Ross Hart, former Labor politician
- Michael Hodgman QC, former Liberal politician and barrister
- Justine Keay, former Labor politician
- Christine Milne AO, former leader of the Australian Greens
- Ben Small, former Liberal politician
- Jonno Duniam, Liberal politician

===== State Premiers =====
- David Bartlett, former Premier of Tasmania
- Michael Field, former Premier of Tasmania
- Lara Giddings, Labor politician and former Premier of Tasmania
- Will Hodgman, Liberal politician and former Premier of Tasmania

===== State and territory politicians =====
- Guy Barnett, Liberal politician
- Sir Max Bingham, QC, former Deputy Premier and Opposition Leader of Tasmania
- David Bushby, Liberal politician
- Roy Fagan, former barrister and Deputy Premier of Tasmania
- Mike Gaffney, Independent MLC
- Adrian Gibson, OAM, former Liberal politician and barrister
- Sue Napier, former Liberal politician
- Michelle O'Byrne, Labor politician
- Ros Spence, Labor politician

===== Other politicians =====
- Sue Hickey, Lord Mayor of Hobart
- Albert Van Zetten, Mayor of Launceston
- Hannah Yeoh, Malaysian politician, Minister of Youth and Sports (Malaysia)
- Halimah Ali, Malaysian politician, MP for Kapar

==== Public servants ====
- Ashton Calvert, AC, former Secretary of the Department of Foreign Affairs and Trade; Rhodes Scholar
- Stephen Gumley, CEO of the Australian Defence Materiel Organisation
- Philip Haddon-Cave, former Financial Secretary of Hong Kong
- Fathimath Dhiyana Saeed, SAARC Secretary-General

=== Humanities ===
==== Arts ====
- Anthony Ackroyd, comedian, speaker and writer
- Courtney Barnett, musician
- Rianti Cartwright, actress, model and presenter of MTV Indonesia
- John Clark, former director of NIDA
- Ian Cresswell, composer
- Essie Davis, film actress
- Matthew Dewey, composer
- Hannah Gadsby, comedian
- Roger Hodgman, director
- Constantine Koukias, composer
- Michael Lampard, opera singer, conductor and composer
- Geoffrey Lancaster, classical pianist
- Andrew Legg, ARIA-award nominated musician
- Raffaele Marcellino, composer
- Luke McGregor, comedian and actor
- Graeme Murphy, AO, ballet dancer and choreographer
- Robyn Nevin, AM, actress, director and former head of the Sydney Theatre Company
- Tom Samek, painter, stage designer and printmaker
- Prithviraj Sukumaran, Indian actor
- Megan Walch, artist
- David Walsh, founder of the Museum of Old and New Art
- Shaun Wilson, artist and film director

==== History ====
- Marilyn Lake, historian
- Henry Reynolds, historian

==== Journalism and media ====
- John J. Smithies, founding director of the Australian Centre for the Moving Image
- Charles Wooley, television journalist

==== Literature, writing and poetry ====
- Ivy Alvarez, author and poet
- Tim Bowden, author and journalist
- Helene Chung Martin, author and journalist
- Stephen Edgar, poet
- Richard Flanagan, author and film director; Rhodes Scholar
- Christopher Koch, author of The Year of Living Dangerously
- Amanda Lohrey, author and academic
- Christobel Mattingley, author
- Margaret Scott, author and poet
- Aaron Smith, author and journalist
- Vivian Smith, poet
- Danielle Wood, author
- Tansy Rayner Roberts, author

=== Law ===
- Damian Bugg, former Commonwealth and Tasmanian Director of Public Prosecutions
- Enid Campbell, AO, legal scholar, first Australian female professor and law school dean
- Chief Justice Ewan Crawford, Former Chief Justice and Lieutenant-Governor of Tasmania
- Stephen Estcourt, QC, Tasmanian Supreme Court judge
- Philip Lewis Griffiths, Acting Chief Judge of the Mandated Territory of New Guinea
- Hon Justice Peter Heerey, Federal Court Judge
- Andrew Inglis Clark, principal author of the Australian Constitution, barrister, politician and judge
- Leo Keke, first Nauruan lawyer, Nauruan MP (1976-1980)
- Duncan Kerr, Judge of the Federal Court of Australia, President of the Administrative Appeals Tribunal and former Attorney-General of Australia
- Michael Mansell, Aboriginal rights activist and criminal lawyer
- Davendra Pathik, former Judge of the Supreme Court of Fiji
- David Mitchell, former Solicitor-general of Lesotho, Tasmanian representative at the Australian Constitutional Convention 1998 and procurator of the Presbyterian Church of Australia

=== Sciences ===
- Abigail Barrows, marine research scientist
- Noel Benson, geologist
- Geoffrey Charles Bratt, chemist and lichenologist
- Edward Byrne, neuroscientist, Principal of King's College, London; former Vice-Chancellor of Monash University
- John Donaldson, applied mathematics academic; father of Mary, Queen of Denmark
- Richard Dowden, noted geo- and astrophysicist
- Theodore Thomson Flynn, biologist and professor of biology; father of Errol Flynn
- Genevieve Gates, mycologist, ecologist, and taxonomist who is particularly focused on the fungal diversity of Tasmania.
- Sir Leonard Huxley, physicist
- Catherine King, ecotoxicologist, Antarctic researcher
- Kenneth G. McCracken, physicist and winner of the Pawsey Medal
- Jessica Melbourne-Thomas, marine ecologist and ecosystem modeller with the Australian Antarctic Division
- David Paver Mellor, inorganic chemist
- Beryl Nashar, geologist and first female PhD in geology, first female Dean of a School in Australia

=== Sports ===
- George Bailey, Australian cricketer
- Brendon Bolton, senior coach of the Carlton Football Club
- Scott Brennan, gold medalist at the 2008 Beijing Summer Olympics for rowing
- Peter Daniel, former Essendon footballer
- Simon Hollingsworth, former athlete and CEO of the Australian Sports Commission; Rhodes Scholar
- Kerry Hore, Olympic rower
- Hamish Peacock, Olympic javelin thrower
- Meaghan Volker, Olympic rower
- Denis Scanlon, former Essendon footballer

=== Other ===
- Phillip Aspinall, Primate of the Anglican Church of Australia
- Simon Longstaff, Executive Director of the St James Ethics Centre
- Michael Lynch, evangelist and Christian blogger
- Bill Mollison, "father of permaculture"
- Brodie Neill, industrial designer
- Helen Szoke, Chief Executive of Oxfam Australia, former Australian Race Discrimination Commissioner and former Victorian Equal Opportunity and Human Rights Commissioner

== Administration ==
=== Chancellors ===
Order	Chancellor	Years	Notes
1	The Hon. Sir William Lambert Dobson	1890–1898	
2	The Reverend George Clarke	1898–1907	
3	The Hon. Sir John Stokell Dodds, KCMG	1907–1914	
4	The Hon. Tetley Gant, CMG	1914–1924	
5	The Hon. Sir (Neil) Elliott Lewis, KCMG	1924–1933	
6	Mr William Stops	1933–1944	
7	The Hon. Sir John Demetrios Morris, KCMG	1944–1956	
	Mr Cecil Roy Baker, OBE	1953 (acting)	
8	The Hon. Sir Henry Seymour Baker, KCMG, DSO	1956–1963	
9	Sir Henry Beaufort Somerset, CBE	1964–1972	
10	Sir (Eustace) John Cameron, CBE	1973–1981	
11	Sir (John) Peter Lloyd	1982–1985	
12	The Hon. Sir Guy Green, AC, KBE, CVO	1985–1995	
13	The Hon. Mr Justice William Zeeman	1995 (acting), 1996–1998	
	Ms Kimbra Boyer	1998 (acting)	
14	Dr Michael Vertigan, AC	1998–2006	
15	Mr Damian Bugg, AM, QC	2006–2012	
16	The Hon. Michael Field, AC	2013–June 2021	
17	Ms Alison Watkins	21 June 2021 – present	

=== Vice-Chancellors ===
Order	Vice-Chancellor	Years	Notes
1	George Clarke	1890–1898	
2	James Backhouse Walker	1898–1899	
3	Thomas Stephens	1900–1901	
4	Andrew Inglis Clark, KCMG	1901–1903	
5	Sir Neil Elliott Lewis, KCMG	1903–1909	
6	Tetley Gant, CMG	1909–1914	
7	William Stops	1914–1933	
8	Robert Dunbabin	1933–1933	
9	E. Morris Miller, CBE	1933–1945	
10	Alan Burn	1945–1949	
11	Torleiv Hytten, CMG	1949–1957	
12	Keith Isles, CMG	1957–1969	
13	Sir George Cartland, CMG	1969–1977	
14	David Caro, AO OBE	1977–1982	
15	Alec Lazenby, AO	1982–1990	
16	Alan Gilbert, AO	1991–1996	
17	Don McNicol	1996–2002	
18	Daryl Le Grew, AO	2003–2010	
19	Peter Rathjen	2011–2017	
20	Rufus Black	2018–present	

== Faculty ==
- Thomas Bavin, law academic and past Premier of New South Wales
- David Bollard, classical pianist
- Angela Christine Bridgland (former lecturer at TCAE), library educator
- Barry Brook, environmental sustainability academic
- Hans Adolph Buchdahl, physicist
- Douglas Copland, economist
- Rodney Croome, LGBT advocate and academic
- Winifred Curtis, botanist, author and plant science academic
- Robert Delbourgo, physicist
- John Dalgleish Donaldson, mathematics academic
- Angela Dwyer, social scientist and writer
- Roy Fagan, law academic and past Deputy Premier of Tasmania
- John Field, senior army officer and engineering academic
- Theodore Thomson Flynn, biologist, father of Errol Flynn
- Adrian Franklin, sociologist and television personality
- Barbara R. Holland, mathematics academic
- Peter D. Jarvis, physicist
- Michael Kirby, former Justice of the High Court of Australia
- Gareth Koch, classical guitarist
- E. E. Kurth, chemistry academic
- Delphine Lannuzel, sea ice biogeochemist and Antarctic researcher
- Frank Madill, AM, former Liberal politician, medical doctor and author
- John Martinkus, journalist
- James McAuley, poet
- Tim McCormack, international humanitarian law academic
- Jocelyn McPhie, adjunct professor of volcanology
- Lindsay Simpson, journalist, academic and crime writer
- Sydney Sparkes Orr, philosopher
- Garth Paltridge, atmospheric physicist
- Doug Parkinson, law academic and politician
- Anya Reading, geophysicist
- Grote Reber, radio astronomer
- Henry Reynolds, historian
- Steven M. Smith, plant genetics and biochemistry academic
- Muthucumaraswamy Sornarajah, law academic
- Michael Tate, Catholic priest, legal scholar and former Labor politician
- Helen Tiffin, post-colonial theorist
- Ernest Ewart Unwin, education academic
- Edward Ronald Walker, diplomat and economist
- Kate Warner, legal academic and former Governor of Tasmania
- Peter Whish-Wilson, politician and economist
