= Robert Jarman =

Australian opera director

Robert Jarman is an Australian theatre artist based in Hobart, Tasmania. Primarily a director and actor, he is also a writer and designer.

== Education ==
Jarman studied English and Drama at the University of Sydney, where he participated extensively with the Sydney University Dramatic Society, performing, writing and directing shows varying in style from Shakespeare to experimental political cabaret.

== Career ==
In the late 1980s, Jarman moved to Hobart where he quickly established himself as one of the leading entities within the Tasmanian arts industry.

He directed the Australasian Premiere of Philip Glass's opera Hydrogen Jukebox at the Tasmanian Conservatorium of Music where he is currently the lecturer in Music Theatre.

He has collaborated extensively with composers including Raffæle Marcellino and Matthew Dewey.

== Productions ==
Year	Title	Genre	Involvement	Other notes
2009	I Am My Own Wife		Actor	
2008	Les Misérables	Musical	Director	(Tasmanian Theatre Trust)
2007	Con Artists	Puppet theatre	Director	Terrapin Puppet Theatre
2007	underwhere	Physical theatre	Director	Lucy Who Productions
2007	Troilus and Cressida	Shakespeare	Director	(Old Nick Company)
2005	The Death of Chatterton	Opera	Director/Co-librettist	Written by Matthew Dewey (IHOS Opera)
2005	Macbeth	Shakespeare	Director	(Hobart Repertory Theatre)
2005	A Midsummer Night's Dream	Shakespeare	Director	(Hobart Repertory Theatre)
2004	Euphonic Temples	Opera	Director/Designer	Conducted by Jean Louis Forestier (IHOS Opera)
2001	The Flight of Les Darcy	Opera	Director/Librettist	Written by Raffæle Marcellino (10 Days on the Island)

2019 The Protecting Veil. ‘The Protecting Veil’ takes inspiration and incorporates material from ‘The Seven Sacraments of Nicholas Poussin’ written and performed by Neil Bartlett, first produced at The London Hospital, produced by Artangel, London, July 1, 1997.

== Honours ==
In 2001 he was awarded the Australian Centenary of Federation Medal for services to the performing arts.
