= Olegas (opera) =

Opera by Constantine Koukias

- Opera by Constantine Koukias
- Librettist: Natasha Cica
- Language: English and Lithuanian

Olegas is an opera based on the life of Lithuanian-born Tasmanian wilderness photographer Olegas Truchanas. Music for the opera was composed by Constantine Koukias, Tasmanian composer and opera director of Greek ancestry based in Amsterdam, where he is known by his Greek name of Konstantin Koukias. The libretto was written by Natasha Cica.

Olegas Truchanas was instrumental in bringing the beauty of Lake Pedder in Southwest Tasmania to the attention of the Australian and international public in an unsuccessful attempt to stop the lake and its remarkable pink beach being inundated by a dam constructed to produce hydro-electricity.

Sung in Lithuanian and English, the opera's themes are resilience and renewal – qualities that enabled Truchanas to rise from deprivation to find an inner strength and clarity, which he needed to do several times during his life. In addition to the loss of Lake Pedder, Truchanas suffered through World War II in Lithuania; several years later he lost his home (and his photographic work) in the devastating 1967 Tasmanian fires.

Truchanas drowned in the Gordon River as the flood waters were rising on nearby Lake Pedder.

Olegas is a major opera being developed with the support of Truchanas' widow, Melva. In 2007, IHOS Music Theatre and Opera presented excerpts from the work's three acts, the first set in Lithuania, the second in Tasmania up to and including the fires, and the third set in Tasmania during the Pedder campaign. As noted by Gordon Kerry, this work and an earlier opera by Koukias (Tesla – Lightning in His Hand), "explore the lives of individuals concerned with elemental forces".
