= Constantine Koukias =

Tasmanian composer and opera director

Constantine Koukias (born 14 October 1965) is a Tasmanian composer and opera director of Greek ancestry based in Amsterdam, where he is known by his Greek name of Konstantin Koukias. He is the co-founder and artistic director of IHOS Music Theatre and Opera, which was established in 1990 in Tasmania's capital city, Hobart.

Koukias's works range from large-scale music theatre and opera to mobile installation art events. His atmospheric compositions are characterised by mesmerising temporal, spatial and production designs, while his recent works exhibit eastern influences. His avant-garde approach to the presentation of opera has resulted in hybrid productions such as Days and Nights with Christ, To Traverse Water, Mikrovion, The Divine Kiss, Tesla – Lightning in His Hand and The Barbarians. His music theatre works include ICON, Kimisis – Falling Asleep, Borders, Orfeo, Rapture – Sonic Taxi Performance, Schwa – The Neutral Vowel, Antigone and The Da Ponte Project.

Koukias was commissioned in 1993 by the Sydney Opera House Trust to compose the large-scale music theatre piece ICON to celebrate the 20th anniversary of the Sydney Opera House. His Incantation II for soprano and digital delay won the International Valentino Bucchi Vocal Prize in Rome in 1997, and in 2004 he was awarded a Sir Winston Churchill Fellowship.

Prayer Bells, in which the composer draws on traditions of Latin, Hebrew and Byzantine chant, had its US premiere in 2010 at the Chicago Cultural Center.

The Barbarians, which was commissioned by the Museum of Old and New Art and inspired by Constantine Cavafy's poem Waiting for the Barbarians, premiered in Hobart in 2012 as part of the MONA FOMA festival. It was nominated for a Helpmann Award for Best New Opera the same year, and Tasmanian company Liminal Spaces won the Event category of Australia's Interior Design Excellence Awards for its conceptualisation of the production's design.

In 2014, Kimisis – Falling Asleep had its Netherlands premiere at Splendor Amsterdam and toured to the Karavaan Festival.

His work Three Episodes from the Diary of Signaller Peter Ellis was a winner of ABC radio's Gallipoli Centenary Composer Competition, receiving its national broadcast premiere in 2015.

Koukias has been the recipient of numerous other international commissions and awards, and his design credits include the internationally acclaimed Odyssey and Medea.

EPIRUS – An Ancient Voice, was premiered in 2016 and was composed for ondist Nadia Ratsimandresy. A version for Piano was composed for Gabriella Smart and in 2021 this work had its Russian premier at the Sheremetev Place, St. Petersburg by Alexey Pudiov

His Before The Flame Goes Out:Memorial to the Jewish Martyrs of Ioannina, Greece, premiered at the Stedelijk Museum Amsterdam, then toured to the Mona Foma Festival in 2017

In 2018, he directed the award winning chamber opera Backwards from Winter, by US composer Douglas Knehans for the Dark Mofo festival.

== Education ==
Koukias studied at the Tasmanian Conservatorium of Music and the Sydney Conservatorium of Music.

- 1979 – 1981 Ian Cugley – Composition, University of Tasmania
- 1981 – 1985 Johannes Roose – Flute, University of Tasmania
- 1983 – 1984 Don Kay – Composition, University of Tasmania
- 1984 – 1985 Michael Cubbin – Flute, University of Tasmania
- 1984 – 1985 Peter Billam – Composition, University of Tasmania
- 1985 Keith Humble – Composition, La Trobe University, Melbourne
- 1985 – 1988 Michael Scott – Flute, NSW Conservatorium of Music
- 1986 Mark Kopytman – Composition, Rubin University of Jerusalem
- 1986 Richard David Hames, Composers School, Adelaide
- 1986 – 1988 Thermos Mexis Greek Instrumentation, Sydney
- 1986 – 1989 Ross Edwards – Composition, Sydney

== List of works ==
=== Operas ===
- 1990: Days and Nights with Christ, an opera in two parts, sung in ecclesiastical and modern Greek
- 1992: To Traverse Water, an opera in two parts, sung in ecclesiastical and modern Greek
- 1994: Mikrovion – 36 Images in a Phantom Flux of Life, an opera in five parts
- 1998: The Divine Kiss, an opera in seven parts
- 2003: Tesla – Lightning in His Hand, an opera in two parts, sung in English about the life and times of Nikola Tesla
- 2012: The Barbarians, an opera inspired by the Greek-Alexandrian poet Constantine Cavafy, performed in modern Greek with bilingual narration. Premiered in 2012 as part of the MONA FOMA festival.

=== Music theatre ===
- 1999: Rapture – Sonic Taxi Performance, for solo voices, small chorus and ensemble
- 2001: Spirits of the Hoist, for three solo voices, ensemble and tape
- 2002: Schwa – The Neutral Vowel, for two solo voices and tape

=== Orchestral ===
- 1993: ICON, for grand orchestra, antiphonal choir (80 voices), 8 percussionists and tape; premiered on the steps of the Sydney Opera House
- 2003: Within a Prayer at Lamplighting, for orchestra; commissioned by the China National Symphony Orchestra
- 2004: Ancient Immortal Spirit, for orchestra and mezzo-soprano soloist; premiered by the Tasmanian Symphony Orchestra

=== Choral works ===
- 2001: Prayer Bells – PENTEKOSTARION, for 3 solo chanters and male choirs with hand bells
- TROPARION 1 – 'O 'Gladsome Light' , for mixed girls voices with river stones and digital delay; sung in Greek, text from the Divine Liturgy
- TROPARION 2 – 'Only-begotten Son' , for solo countertenor and male choir (treble, tenor, baritone and basses) with river stones, sung in Greek, text from the Divine Liturgy
- EPIRUS – 'An Ancient Voice' , was composed for ondist Nadia Ratsimandresy and premiered in 2016

=== Chamber music ===
- 1983: Requiescat, for solo soprano
- 1985: Echoi 1 – Incantation, for soprano and digital delay
- 1986: Echoi 2 – Byzantine Images, for amplified flute and digital delay
- 2003: 1000 Door, A Thousand Windows, for soprano and video projection
- 2003: Seven Veils, for piano and video projection
- 2017: Before The Flame Goes Out:Memorial to the Jewish Martyrs of Ioannina, Greece, for soprano, ondes martenot, violin, cello, piano & tape

== Notable students ==
In addition to his own career as a composer, Koukias has mentored numerous other composers including Matthew Dewey, Michael Lampard and Thanapoom Sirichang.
