= The Lunch Box =

The Lunch Box is a chamber opera by Thai composer Thanapoom Sirichang and Thai librettist Bringkop Vora-Urai. Composed entirely in Tasmania under the guidance of IHOS Artistic Director Constantine Koukias, The Lunch Box may be the first opera sung in Thai to blend traditional Thai music and contemporary Western opera.

== A Buddhist tale ==
The Lunch Box tells the story of a mother's devotion to her only son, a fundamentally good farmer whose rage at the untimely death of his father has tragic consequences. This much-loved Thai Buddhist folk tale is believed by the librettist to be based on an actual incident that occurred in Thailand 300 years ago.

== Composing western opera for Thai voices ==
Composition challenges included using the Western staff and notation for Thai music, which is usually notated quite differently, and writing for a tonal language such as Thai, in which changing the pitch of the word can change its meaning.

== Premiere ==
The opera, for two singers and ensemble, was commissioned by IHOS Music Theatre and Opera, and premiered in Hobart, Tasmania, Australia, on 26 March 2009 as part of the 2009 10 Days on the Island Festival. The Hobart production featured soprano Monique Klongtruadroke and baritone Saran Suebsantiwongse, both of whom have been trained in the Western tradition and have sung with the Bangkok Opera. The "minimalist and bold" portable set evoking a Thai rice field was created by the production's Sydney-based Dutch Director and Designer Joey Ruigrok van der Werven. The Western-style ensemble, which is incorporated into the stage design, comprises violin, clarinet, cello, flute, keyboards and percussion, but a gong and water percussion recall Thai rural scenes. The premiere season was conducted by Tasmanian conductor Michael Lampard.
