= Ian Cresswell =

Australian composer

Ian Cresswell is an Australian composer born in 1968. He obtained Bachelor of Music at the Australian National University in 1996 and Master of Music at the University of Queensland in 2002. Cresswell is currently doing postgraduate studies at the Conservatorium of Music at the University of Tasmania.

Cresswell has won a number of prizes for composition including the Harrold Allen Memorial Prize for Composition and the Australian-Franco composition competition for young composers. In 2003, Cresswell was one of the composers featured in an exhibition called The Thrill of the New. In 2004, his short piece Blood Lights (directed by Robert Jarman) made its debut at the University of Tasmania produced by the IHOS Music Theatre Laboratory. It featured projection and complex harmonies to portray the disintegration of a mind.
