= Days and Nights with Christ =

- Opera by Constantine Koukias
- Librettist: Constantine Koukias
- Language: Ecclesiastical and Modern Greek
- Premiere: 1990; Hobart, Tasmania, Australia

Days and Nights with Christ is the first of five full-scale operas by the Constantine Koukias a Tasmanian composer and opera director of Greek ancestry based in Amsterdam, where he is known by his Greek name of Konstantin Koukias. This was the first opera / music theatre production by IHOS Experimental Theatre Troupe (now IHOS Music Theatre and Opera). It premiered at Hobart's Salamanca Arts Festival in 1990 and two years later was a highlight of the Festival of Sydney. The work, which explores images associated with schizophrenia, was inspired by the experiences of the composer's brother and by their shared Greek heritage.

== The text ==
Featuring a dramatic soprano, a countertenor / baritone, a speaking voice (the mother) and a dancer (Christ), Days and Nights with Christ is sung in Ecclesiastical and modern Greek. The libretto is a collection of fragments drawn from Byzantine liturgy, the Old Testament, the New Testament, Jewish-American eccentric Emanuel Bronner's “Rules for Life”, and an interpretation of commentary provided by individuals with schizophrenia.

== Musical influences ==
The music, influenced by Greek Orthodox Byzantine chant, is essentially melodic, combining the human voice with electronically treated acoustic instruments. The ensemble comprises two voices, electric trombone, oboe d'amore and percussion.

== Dance ==
Dancer Christos Linou played Christ in the 1990, 1992 and 1997 productions. Reviewing the 1992 Sydney production, Brian Hoad described the performance as "an extraordinary portrait of anguish and agony, a beautiful yet pitifully broken man painfully struggling through lonely space".

== Staging ==
Days and Nights with Christ is noted for its use of the vast spaces that were so characteristic of early Koukias operas produced by IHOS such as To Traverse Water and Tesla. Innovative staging effects included a wall of ice and a mountain of salt, which together created "almost impossibly vivid stage pictures".

== Selected articles ==
Days and Nights with Christ was last produced in 1997. In the years since then, it has featured in a number of publications, including Gordon Kerry's New Classical Music: Composing Australia and RealTime's In Repertoire: A Selected Guide To Australian Music Theatre. In his detailed and nuanced discussion of the work, Kerry comments that "out of the braying trombone, the electro-acoustic atmospherics, the simple chants, the keening, Koukias has created a compelling portrait of a soul in agony and has done so in sounds, in music."
