= HCO =

HCO may refer to:

== In arts and entertainment ==
- Hobart Chamber Orchestra
- Hollywood Chamber Orchestra

== In science and technology ==
- Aldehyde (HCO-)
- Harvard College Observatory
- Hearing carry over, a type of telecommunications relay service
- Heliocentric orbit, an orbit around the Sun
- Holocene climatic optimum

== Businesses and organizations ==
- Handball Club Odense, a Danish handball club
- Hans Christian Ørsted Institute (HCØ)
- Hollister Co., an American lifestyle brand
- National Socialist Society (Russian: Национал-социалистическое общество, НСО)
- Hanwell Community Observatory, a public outreach astronomy organisation; see Hanwell, Oxfordshire
- Hubbard Communications Office, an organization in the Church of Scientology
