= Matthew Dewey =

Australian composer

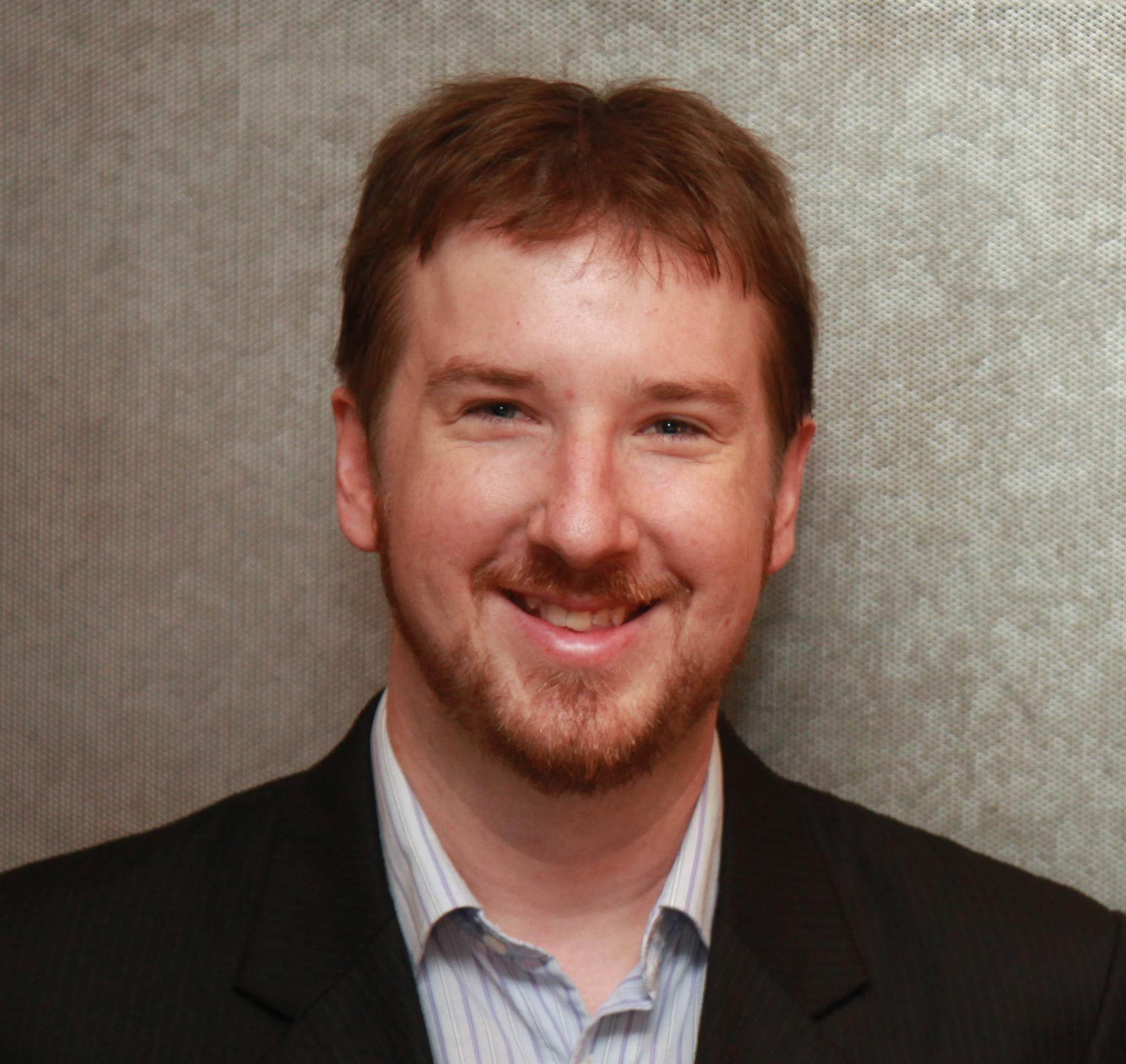
Matthew Dewey

Matthew Ingvald Dewey (born 1984) is an Australian classical music composer, singer, and music producer.

== Biography ==
Matthew Dewey is an Australian composer and music producer who studied composition with Professor Douglas Knehans at the University of Tasmania and composition/theatrical design/singing with Greek-Australian composer/designer Constantine Koukias. His very early years were spent training with the IHOS Music Theatre Laboratory in the creation of new musical-theatrical works, and this early exposure led to a career that flourished at a young age. In 2003 he sang the bass role in the Australasian premiere of Hydrogen Jukebox by Philip Glass.

He works mostly in concert music and opera/music-theatre and has been involved in the premieres of more than 20 new works as a principal performer and singer, and numerous other productions variously as composer, orchestrator, conductor and compositional assistant. He currently works as the music director for ABC Classic FM in Sydney.

== Major works ==
=== Orchestral ===
- Symphony No. 1 (Port Arthur, 1996), for string orchestra. Commissioned by Damien Holloway. Premiered at the Hobart Town Hall, by the Hobart Chamber Orchestra, conducted by Edwin Paling 17 May 2008. (3 movements) 21'00"
- Symphony No. 2, ex Oceano, for symphony orchestra. Commissioned by Sue Anderson. Premiered by the Czech National Symphony Orchestra, conducted by Jan Kucera, 2013. (4 movements) 46'00"
- Orchestral Suite No. 1. Premiered by the Russian Philharmonic Orchestra, conducted by Alexey Osetrov, 2009. (3 movements) 16'30"
- Ecstatic Visions – double concerto for trumpet and clarinet. Premiered by James Morrison, Julian Bliss and the Queensland Symphony Orchestra, conducted by Johannes Fritzsch, at the Queensland Performing Arts Centre in July 2013. (3 movements) 24'00"

== Other works ==
Dewey has worked with a wide variety of genres and materials.

=== Operas ===
- The Buzz of the Sea
- 15 Years on Hold
- The Death of Chatterton (about the life of Thomas Chatterton)
- The Priest's Passion;

=== Songs ===
He has composed various songs including two cycles utilising text by the esteemed expat South African poet Anne Kellas: Isolated States and Notes for Mount Moono; and two song suites based on the work of his brother, entitled Elegy and Compass. The latter was commissioned and premiered by the Sydney Children's Choir.

=== Chamber ===
His chamber works include two pieces written for the Seymour Group: A Dance on Five Claps and Voyage, the latter of which was written for the Seymour Group in conjunction with the internationally renowned bass-clarinettist Harry Sparnaay; Flight and Reverie which premiered at the University of Hawaii; and Entropic Visions which was given by Joshua Rubin at the Lincoln Center in New York.

=== Other ===
Dewey's First Symphony (for string orchestra) dealt with emotions surrounding the Port Arthur Massacre. The symphony was inspired by Tasmanian playwright Tom Holloway's play Beyond the Neck.

He has also worked as a singer, premiering a number of roles and new works by Australian and International composers.

== Awards and scholarships ==
- International Arts Mentorship (Foundation for Young Australians and Ars Musica Australis 2006)
- IHOS Music Theatre and Opera Young Artist Bursary (IHOS 2004)
- Hobart City Council Don Kay Scholarship for Music Composition (University of Tasmania 2003)
