= Beryl Sedivka =

Australian pianist

Pauline Beryl Sedivka OAM
- Born: Diana Merrien; November 27, 1928 (age 97); Aylesbury, England
- Genres: Classical music
- Occupations: musician, lecturer
- Instrument: piano
- Formerly of: Tasmanian Conservatorium Trio
- Spouse: Jan Sedivka (married 1960–present)

Pauline Beryl Sedivka (née Diana Merrien; b. 27 November 1928) is a classical pianist and lecturer based in Tasmania, Australia.

== Career ==
Born in Aylesbury, England, she was educated in France where she studied with pianist Marcel Ciampi. Following the end of World War II, she returned to England, studied with Franz Reizenstein and Solomon Cutner, and performed on the BBC.

In 1960 she married violinist Jan Sedivka, and they moved to Queensland, Australia the following year. After several years at the Queensland Conservatorium, they relocated to Hobart, Tasmania, and formed the Tasmanian Conservatorium Trio with cellist Sela Trau. They performed in Hobart and Launceston, and gained praise from the local press. Their final performance as the Tasmanian Conservatorium Trio was held in 1978.

Beryl Sedivka is considered one of Hobart's best known and most prominent pianists. She has performed for the ABC, and lectured at the Tasmanian Conservatorium of Music between 1966 and 2008, with her students including Geoffrey Lancaster, and Neil Goodchild.

She was awarded an Order of Australian Medal in 2021 for service to music as a performer and mentor.
