= Southern Gospel Choir =

The Southern Gospel Choir in concert

The Southern Gospel Choir is a gospel choir based at the Tasmanian Conservatorium of Music in Hobart, Tasmania, and is directed by Dr. Andrew Legg.

The choir and its band, the Very Righteous Gospel Band were formed by Dr. Legg in 2000, soon after he became a staff member at the Conservatorium.

The Southern Gospel Choir and Legg have received acclaim internationally with leading gospel artists in the USA. Legg has worked with many prominent US gospel artists including Myron Butler, Kirk Franklin, Horace Clarence Boyer, Marvin Weatherford and Xanielle Davis. The choir were nominated for an ARIA award in 2005.

== Choir structure ==
The choir consists of three main groups:

- The main choir, which requires a single audition and is open to all members of the public as well as Conservatorium students. This main choir now numbers at over 120.
- The "45". This smaller, more exclusive group requires a second, more extensive audition, and handles more professional performances and recordings.
- The "Disciples". This group ranges in number from 6 to 12 depending on the performance, who usually have their own individual microphones in performances with the 45 or main choir, and sometimes perform small professional and promotional gigs on their own. The Disciples are made up of singers selected by Legg and vocal coach Maria Lurighi from the 45, specifically for their vocal sounds and the mix of the group together.

Members of the choir range in age from 14 to 60 and come from many varied backgrounds and parts of the Tasmanian community.

The Very Righteous Gospel Band in concert with the SGC.

Many Hobart musicians, especially singers, are or have previously been members of the Southern Gospel Choir, and some have been featured as soloists, including vocal coach Maria Lurighi. Soloists are usually picked from the choir by Lurighi or Dr. Legg to suit a particular song.

== Styles ==
Whilst performing under the general genre of gospel music, the Southern Gospel Choir integrates songs of many styles into its repertoire. These include traditional spirituals such as Steal Away, as well as many contemporary pieces which take their inspiration from styles such as jazz, funk, pop, rock, and hip hop. This is intended to make the music performed by the choir accessible and enjoyable to a wide range of audiences.

The Southern Gospel Choir performs varied styles of gigs, from performances with their band to "unplugged" concerts with just piano and choir, to collaborations with other musicians such as The Idea of North and the Tasmanian Symphony Orchestra. A usual concert consists of many songs from various styles of gospel music, some with the band and some without, and many of the pieces feature soloists and improvisation.

== Association with the Conservatorium & University ==
The Southern Gospel Choir is run as several units at the Tasmanian Conservatorium of Music, which is part of the Faculty of Arts at the University of Tasmania. Members of the general public who are not enrolled in a university degree can audition for and join the choir, and are then enrolled in the choir unit as a part of an associate degree in Music Studies. This can then count towards this degree (or a number of other degrees) if they choose to later enrol in a course at the University of Tasmania.

Many students at the Conservatorium who are enrolled in courses, classical or contemporary, such as the Bachelor of Music, Bachelor of Music Studies, Associate degrees, Rock Revolutions or Musical Theatre courses use the gospel choir units to count towards their degrees.

Weekly rehearsals for the choir are held at the Conservatorium, and ticket sales for the choir's performances are handled by the Conservatorium's booking office.

== Notable Past Performances ==
- In early September 2009, the Southern Gospel Choir performed in the first production of "Broadway To Australia", a collaboration between the University of Tasmania, the Tasmanian Conservatorium of Music and the American Society of Composers, Authors and Publishers (ASCAP). Selected pieces were featured in the show from musicals by Broadway writing team Lynn Ahrens & Stephen Flaherty, who were interviewed onstage throughout the show. The SGC performed alongside an orchestra consisting of Conservatorium staff & students, and notable Australian music theatre performers Kellie Rode, Christopher Parker, Adrian Li Donni, and Julie O'Reilly. The show was performed in Melbourne, Sydney, and Hobart.
- On 22 November 2008, the SGC performed to a full house alongside internationally renowned a cappella quartet The Idea of North and the Tasmanian Symphony Orchestra in a show named "Jazz Meets Gospel" at Wrest Point's Tasman Room, featuring both the choir's regular repertoire as well as combined items with the TSO and TION.
- The Southern Gospel Choir were a featured act in Sing Salamanca in early January 2008 and again in January 2009, part of the Salamanca Arts Festival. They performed alongside musicians such as Violent Femmes bassist Brian Ritchie, Michael Spiby of The Badloves, and local musician Dean Stevenson.
- 12 members represented the choir in Dream Masons, a large-scale theatre spectacle performed in the windows and on the facade of the Salamanca Arts Centre in March 2007 as part of Ten Days On The Island. They performed 3 songs throughout the piece.
- The Southern Gospel Choir were guest artists at The Idea of North's concert held at the Theatre Royal in late 2006, to promote their album The Gospel Project.

== Discography ==
=== Albums ===
List of albums
Title	Album details
Great Day	Released: 2005; Label: Formats: CD
High on a Mountain	Released: 2009; Label: Formats: CD
Brighter Day	Released: 2012; Label: Formats: CD

== Awards and nominations ==
=== ARIA Music Awards ===
The ARIA Music Awards is an annual awards ceremony that recognises excellence, innovation, and achievement across all genres of Australian music. They commenced in 1987.

Year	Nominee / work	Award	Result	Ref.
2005	Great Day	Best World Music Album	Nominated	
