= Hydrogen Jukebox =

1990 chamber opera by Philip Glass and Allen Ginsberg

- Chamber opera by Philip Glass
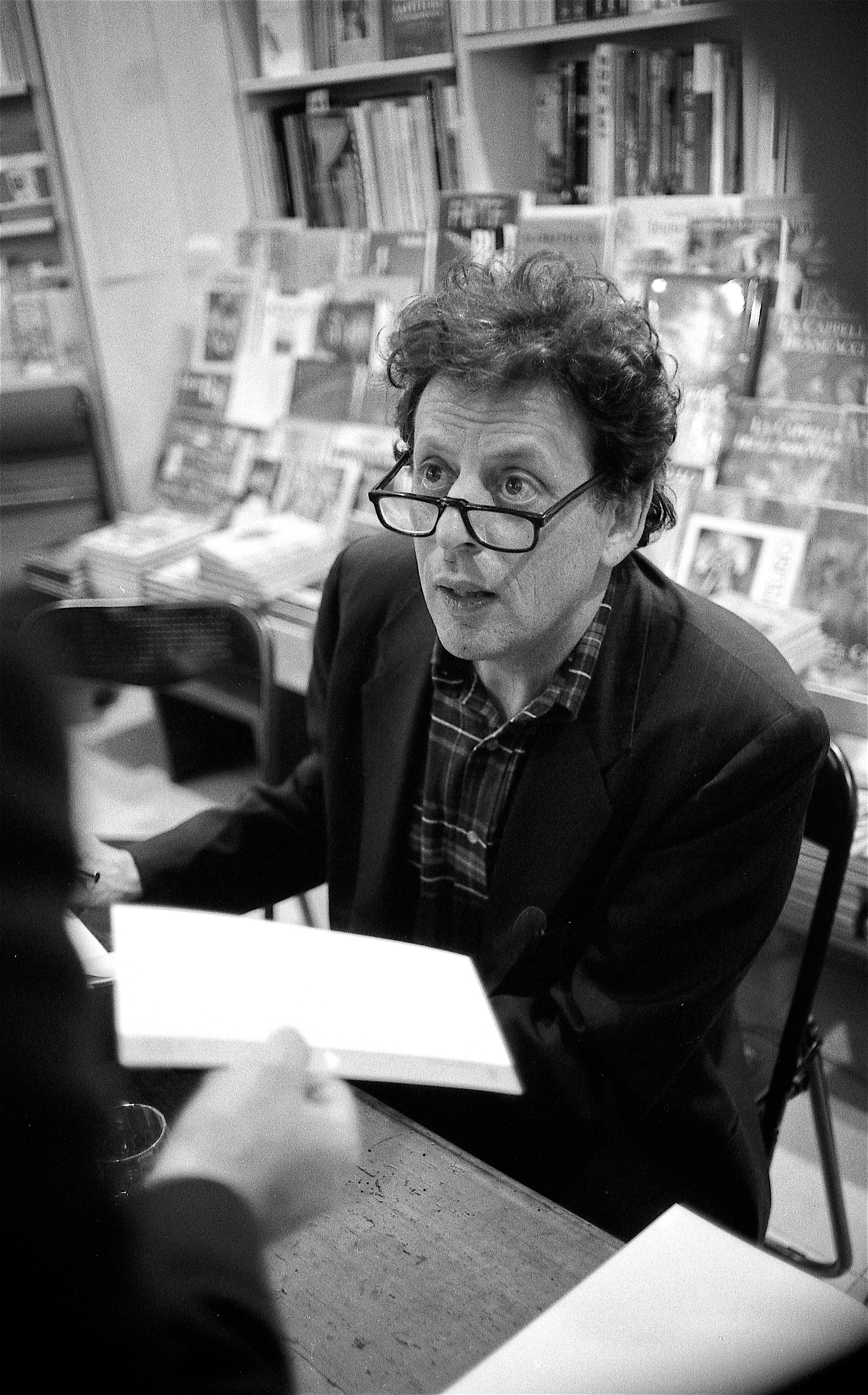
- The composer in 1993
- Premiere: May 26, 1990; Spoleto Festival USA

Hydrogen Jukebox is a 1990 chamber opera featuring the music of Philip Glass and the work of Beat poet Allen Ginsberg. Its name is taken from a phrase coined by Ginsberg, from his 1955 poem Howl.

== History ==
Of the project, Glass said:

In 1988...I happened to run into Allen Ginsberg at St. Mark's Bookshop in New York City and asked him if he would perform with me. We were in the poetry section, and he grabbed a book from the shelf and pointed out Wichita Vortex Sutra. The poem, written in 1966 and reflecting the anti-war mood of the times, seemed highly appropriate for the occasion. I composed a piano piece to accompany Allen's reading, which took place at the Schubert Theater on Broadway.

Allen and I so thoroughly enjoyed the collaboration that we soon began talking about expanding our performance into an evening-length music-theater work. It was right after the 1988 presidential election, and neither Bush nor Dukakis seemed to talk about anything that was going on. I remember saying to Allen, if these guys aren't going to talk about the issues then we should.

The piece was intended to form a portrait of America covering the 1950s through the late 1980s. Glass and Ginsberg sought to incorporate the personal poems of Ginsberg, reflecting on social issues: the anti-war movement, the sexual revolution, drugs, eastern philosophy, environmental issues. The six vocal parts were thought to represent six archetypal American characters—a waitress, a policeman, a businessman, a cheerleader, a priest, and a mechanic.

Ginsberg said:

Ultimately, the motif of Hydrogen Jukebox, the underpinning, the secret message, secret activity, is to relieve human suffering by communicating some kind of enlightened awareness of various themes, topics, obsessions, neuroses, difficulties, problems, perplexities that we encounter as we end the millennium.

The title Hydrogen Jukebox comes from a verse in the poem Howl: '...listening to the crack of doom on the hydrogen jukebox...' It signifies a state of hypertrophic high-tech, a psychological state in which people are at the limit of their sensory input with civilization's military jukebox, a loud industrial roar, or a music that begins to shake the bones and penetrate the nervous system as a hydrogen bomb may do someday, reminder of apocalypse.

The work formally premiered May 26, 1990 at the Spoleto Music Festival in Charleston, SC. However, the workshop staged version had premiered one month earlier at the American Music Theater Festival held in the Plays and Players theater, 1714 Delancey Place, Philadelphia, PA on April 26. It ran there until May 6, followed on that closing night by an invitation-only reception attended by Philip Glass and Allen Ginsberg and other members of the company was held nearby.

The Australasian premiere was given on April 17, 2003 at the Mount Nelson Theatre (Hobart, Tasmania) by the Tasmanian Conservatorium of Music, conducted by Douglas Knehans and directed by Robert Jarman.

== Songs ==
=== Part one ===
- Song #1: Iron Horse - "Lightning's blue glare fills the Oklahoma plains"
- Song #2: Iron Horse - "Who's the enemy year after year?"
- Song #3: Jaweh and Allah Battle - "Jahweh with Atom Bomb"
- Song #4: Consulting I Ching smoking pot listening to the Fugs sing Blake - "That which pushes upward"
- Song #5: Marijuana Notation - "How sick I am!"
- Song #6: Patna-Benares Express - "Whatever it may be whoever it may be" / Last night in Calcutta - "Still night the old clock ticks"
- Song #7: To P.O - "The whitewashed room,"
- Song #8: Last Night in Calcutta - "...And the vast starry space-"
- Song #9: Crossing Nation - "Under silver wing" / Over Denver Again - "Grey clouds blot sunglare, mountains float west, plane" / Going to Chicago - "22,000 feet over hazed square vegetable plant"
- Song #10: Wichita Vortex Sutra: Pt 2 - "I'm an old man now, and a lonesome man in Kansas but not afraid"

=== Part two ===
- Song #11: Howl: Moloch (Section II) - "What sphinx of cement and aluminum bashed open their skulls and ate up their brains and imagination?
- Song #12: Manhattan Thirties Flash - "Long stone streets inanimate..."
- Song #13: Cabin in the Rockies - "Sitting on a tree stump with half a cup of tea"
- Song #14: Nagasaki Days VI: Numbers in Red Notebook - "2,000,000 killed in Vietnam
- Song #15: To Aunt Rose - "Aunt Rose—now might I see you"
- Song #16: The Green Automobile - "If I had a green Automobile"
- Song #17: Violence - "Mexicity drugstore table, giant," / CIA Dope Calypso - "Richard Secord and Oliver North"
- Song #18: Nagasaki Days IV - "I walked outside and the bomb'd"
- Song #19: Ayers Rock/Uluru Song - "When the red pond fills fish appear"
- Song #20: Throw out the Yellow Journalists of Bad Grammar - "Out! Out! into the Buddhafields"
- Song #21: Father Death Blues - "Hey Father Death, I'm flying home"

== Recorded release ==
=== Part one ===
- "Song No. 1 from Iron Horse"
- "Song No. 2 Jahweh and Allah Battle"
- "Song No. 3 from Iron Horse"
- "Song No. 4 To P. O."
- "Song No. 5 from Crossing Nation; Over Denver Again; Going to Chicago and To Poe: Over the Planet, Air Albany-Baltimore"
- "Song No. 6 from Wichita Vortex Sutra

=== Part two ===
- "Song No. 7 from Howl"
- "Song No. 8 from Cabin in the Rockies"
- "Song No. 9 from Nagasaki Days (Numbers in Red Notebook)"
- "Song No. 10 Aunt Rose"
- "Song No. 11 from The Green Automobile"
- "Song No. 12 from N. S. A. Dope Calypso"
- "Song No. 13 from Nagasaki Days (Everybody's Fantasy)"
- "Song No. 14 Ayers Rock/Uluru Song and "Throw out the Yellow Journalists...""
- "Song No. 15 Father Death Blues (from Don't Grow Old)"

== Personnel ==
World Premiere (Spoleto festivals)

- Martin Goldray – conductor
- Philip Glass – piano
- Phillip Bush – keyboards
- Alan Johnson – keyboards
- Nelson Padgett – keyboards
- Jack Kripl – winds
- Rex Benicasa & James Pugliese- percussion
- Richard Peck Jr- winds
- Suzan Hanson – soprano
- Darynn Zimmer – soprano
- Linda Thompson – mezzo-soprano
- Richard Fracker – tenor
- Thomas N. Potter – baritone
- James Butler – bass
- Allen Ginsberg – narrator
- Jerome Sirlin – production design

Recording

- Martin Goldray – keyboards, conductor
- Philip Glass – piano
- Carol Wincenc – flute
- Andrew Sterman – soprano saxophone, bass clarinet
- Frank Cassara & James Pugliese- percussion
- Richard Peck – tenor saxophone
- Elizabeth Futral – soprano
- Michele Eaton – soprano
- Mary Ann Hart – mezzo-soprano
- Richard Fracker – tenor
- Gregory Purnhagen – baritone
- Nathaniel Watson – baritone
- Allen Ginsberg – narrator
- Jerome Sirlin – production design

== In popular culture ==
Stephen Colbert met his wife, Evelyn McGee-Colbert, at the premiere of Hydrogen Jukebox at the Spoleto Music Festival in 1990. While interviewing Josh Brolin during an episode of the Late Show with Stephen Colbert originally telecast April 15, 2022, Colbert admitted that when Evelyn asked for his address, he didn't have a pen, so he borrowed one from the person behind him, which happened to be Ginsberg.

Hydrogen Jukebox is a Detroit rock'n'roll band formed in 2019.
