= To Traverse Water =

1992 Opera by Constantine Koukias

- Opera by Constantine Koukias
- Librettist: Constantine Koukias
- Language: Ecclesiastical and Modern Greek
- Premiere: 1992; Hobart, Tasmania, Australia

To Traverse Water is an opera by Constantine Koukias a Tasmanian composer and opera director of Greek ancestry based in Amsterdam, where he is known by his Greek name of Konstantin Koukias. The opera depicts a young Greek woman's departure for Australia and her settlement there. Her tale is loosely based on that of Koukias’ mother, and the opera makes direct reference to her at the end of the show when a slide picture of her appears, along with a tape of her voice intoning an old village song.

Writing of the 1995 Melbourne Festival production, The Age's Jim Davidson noted that "with the modern decline in church-going, one of opera's key functions is to offer ritual re-enactment at an emotionally intense level".

To Traverse Water blends instrumental music, operatic singing, folk song, drama, dance, light sculpture, art installations and film to create a hybrid performance piece. Sung in Ecclesiastical and Modern Greek, the text is drawn from fragments of the Old Testament, the New Testament, the I Ching, Greek folk songs, the Divine Liturgy, and the writings of Kostas Gionis, Vasiliki Koukias (Constantine's mother) and Koukias himself. The work is in two parts and features eight singers, five speaking voices and seven musicians.

As with other large-scale Koukias operas such as Days and Nights with Christ and Tesla - Lightning in His Hand, To Traverse Water is performed in the vast spaces so crucial to early Koukias operas produced by the IHOS Experimental Music Theatre Troupe (now IHOS Music Theatre and Opera) and features "truly epic staging". Describing its 1995 production for the Greek Festival of Sydney, James Waites applauds Ann Wulff's visual production design: "From the roof hang a half-dozen fishing boats, mechanised oars sweeping the air, a potent image holding this story of human transport together."

The opera's narrative is presented in a simple, montage structure: Part One is set in Greece, Part Two in Australia. Through the culturally specific story of Despina, Koukias provides an authentic view of the immigrant experience that avoids cliche. The work, nevertheless, offers an insight into the broader tensions of multiculturalism in Australia.

To Traverse Water was first produced for Hobart's Abel Tasman Festival in 1992. Sound recordings are held in the National Library of Australia, and a seven-minute documentary film of the 1992 production produced by Joy Toma and directed by David Male for SBS Television is available through Screen Australia. Since its last production in 1995, To Traverse Water has also featured in a number of publications, including Gordon Kerry's New Classical Music: Composing Australia and RealTime's In Repertoire: A Selected Guide To Australian Music Theatre.

== Production credits ==
Original production design Ann E. Wulff, American visual artist, in association with Australian visual artists Evangelos Sakaris, Stuart Vaskess, Brian Parkes and Ben Blakenbrough.

Choreographer Christos Linou.

Original Costume Design and Fabrication Caz Pellow-Jones
