= Lampard =

Lampard is a family name that may refer to:

- Allie Lampard (1885–1984), Australian cricketer
- Frank Lampard (born 1978), English footballer and manager (son of the below)
- Frank Lampard (footballer, born 1948), English footballer (father of the above)
- Kate Lampard (born 1960), English barrister
- Michael Lampard (born 1986), Australian opera singer
- Keith Lampard (1945–2020), professional baseball player
- Sarah Lampard (born 1997), Australian rules footballer
