= Lunch (disambiguation) =

Lunch is a midday meal.

Lunch may also refer to:

== Arts, media and entertainment ==
=== Television ===
- Lunch, an episode of the BBC2 Playhouse series
- Lunch, an episode of the Two Fat Ladies series
- Lunch, an episode of the James the Cat series
- Lunch, an episode of the Peppa Pig series
- Lunch, an episode of the Wet Hot American Summer: First Day of Camp series
- Lunch, an episode of the Wet Hot American Summer: Ten Years Later series

=== Other uses in arts, media and entertainment ===
- Lunch (album), the fourth album by the rock band Audience
- "Lunch" (song), a song by Billie Eilish

== Other uses ==
- Lunch, a cricket term

== See also ==
- Lunch box (disambiguation)
