= Mikrovion =

- Opera by Constantine Koukias
- Librettist: Constantine Koukias
- Language: English, Classical and Modern Greek, German, Hebrew, Chinese
- Premiere: 1994; Hobart, Tasmania, Australia

MIKROVION, by Constantine Koukias a Tasmanian composer and opera director of Greek ancestry based in Amsterdam, where he is known by his Greek name of Konstantin Koukias. This opera is described by Maria Shevtsova as "an epic opera about AIDS".

The three-hour opera is in five parts and its 1994 premiere in Hobart, Tasmania, featured 16 principal performers, 7 musicians, 20 men and women in the vocal choruses, a semaphore chorus of 11 high school students as "the voice of God", a creative team of 11 and a production team of 24.

Described by one writer as a "microscopic epic", MIKROVION takes its title from the classical Greek for "small life" - in this case HIV.

The 1994 production by IHOS Music Theatre and Opera included matinee workshops for students that provided an insight into production techniques and information on the disease. In this regard, the opera had both an artistic and an educative ambition: it sought to develop a broad social context for HIV AIDS research while also examining the microscopic world of the virus in relation to technology and perceptions of the body and illness. Its stated aim was "to collapse and re-figure distinctions between such traditionally disparate realms of cultural, political, scientific, moral and psychological concerns towards a broader and more inclusive understanding of the issues arising from the HIV AIDS phenomena".

The artistic design by Ann Wulff included images of tears and semen - the "fluids of love and intimacy" - such as an electron microscope photograph of a tear drop by Ian J. Kaplan. As Danielle Wood wrote at the time, "Who would have thought that something as simple and human as a tear could hold such striking images within?"

In addition to being sung in English, classical and modern Greek, German, Hebrew and Chinese, the composition draws on many forms of coded language, including semaphore, morse code and braille. The libretto, also by Koukias, is composed of fragments from biblical texts, the Torah, the I Ching, Plato, the Origin of the Species, counselling guides, scientific papers, magazines, newspapers and jazz lyrics. As related by journalist Matthew Westwood, "Koukias compares the mutations of language with distortions triggered by the human immunodeficiency virus".

== Part titles ==
1 The Light Side of the God Image
2 The Law of the Plague
3 The Dark Side of the God Image
4 This Letter Will Help You Save Money
5 The Phantom Flux of Life

== 1994 production credits ==
Production Director - Werner Ihlenfeld
Visual Director - Ann Wulff
Music Director - Imogen Lidgett
Conductor - Warwick Stengards
Sound Designer - Donald Hopkins
Artist in Light - Hugh McSpedden
Lighting Designer - Jan Wawrzynczak
Video Artist - Poonkhin Khu
Costume Designer and Fabricator - Caz Pellow-Jones
