= Jan Sedivka =

Jan Boleslav Sedivka
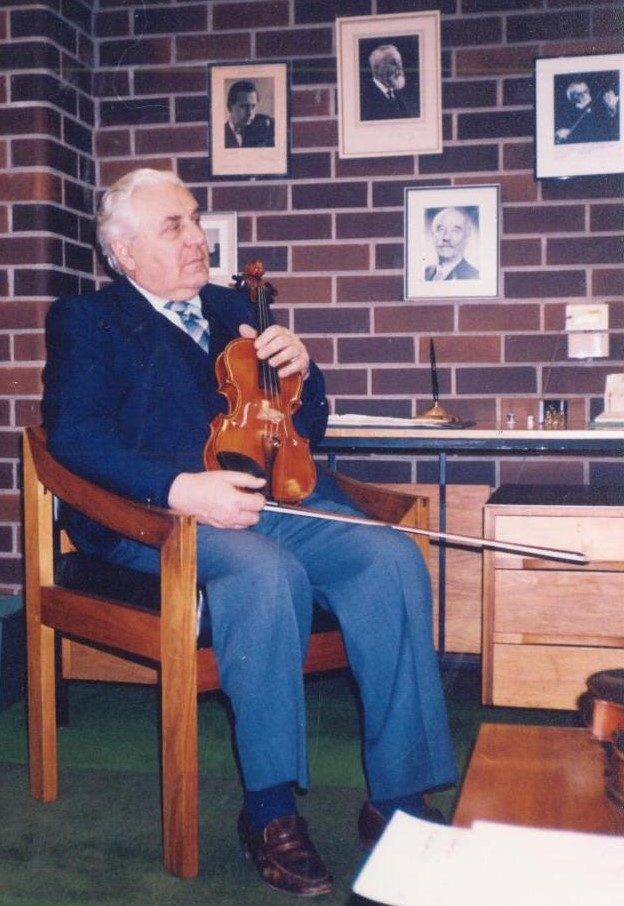
- Jan Sedivka, Mount Nelson, 1988
- Born: 8 September 1917; Slaný, Czechoslovakia
- Died: 23 August 2009 (aged 91); Hobart, Australia
- Partner: Beryl Sedivka
- Awards: Order of Australia

Jan Boleslav Sedivka AM (in Czech: Šedivka) (Slaný, 8 September 1917 – Hobart, 23 August 2009), Czech-born, was one of Australia's foremost violinists and teachers.

== Biography ==
Educated in Czechoslovakia (Otakar Ševčík and Jaroslav Kocián), France (École Normale de Musique, Classe Jacques Thibaud) and England (Max Rostal), Jan Sedivka made his reputation overseas as a soloist, chamber music player and teacher before coming to Australia in 1961.

As a performer, Jan Sedivka gained special merit for his efforts on behalf of Australian contemporary music. In this capacity he introduced a number of important works dedicated to him, in particular concertos by Larry Sitsky (Nos. 1, 2, 3 & 4), James Penberthy, Ian Cugley, Don Kay, Colin Brumby, Edward Cowie and Eric Gross.

His wife Beryl Sedivka is a noted pianist who often performed with him.

== Writings ==
- An Assessment of: “Bach’s Chaconne for Unaccompanied Violin - a Study in Interpretation” by Graham Wood, ds., Hobart, 1974

== Honours and awards ==
- Member of the Order of Australia 1987
- Honorary Fellow, Trinity College of Music, London
- Honorary Doctor of Letters, University of Tasmania
- Honorary Professor, Shanghai Conservatory of Music
- Memorial Gold Medal, Prague Academy of Musical Arts
- Honorary Fellowship in Music Australia
- Honorary Citizen, Royal City of Slany (Czech Republic)
- Honorary Professor University of Tasmania 1995
- Distinguished Service Award Australian Strings Association 1998.

=== Bernard Heinze Memorial Award ===
The Sir Bernard Heinze Memorial Award is given to a person who has made an outstanding contribution to music in Australia.

Year	Nominee / work	Award	Result	Ref.
1995	Jan Sedivka	Sir Bernard Heinze Memorial Award	awarded	

=== Don Banks Music Award ===
The Don Banks Music Award was established in 1984 to publicly honour a senior artist of high distinction who has made an outstanding and sustained contribution to music in Australia. It was founded by the Australia Council in honour of Don Banks, Australian composer, performer and the first chair of its music board.

Year	Nominee / work	Award	Result
2004	Jan Sedivka	Don Banks Music Award	awarded

== Bibliography ==
- Philippe Borer, Aspects of European Influences on Violin Playing & Teaching in Australia, M.Mus. diss., 1988 (on Jan Sedivka's violin playing and teaching philosophies see Chapters III and IV) https://eprints.utas.edu.au/18865/
- Lyndal Edmiston, “The teacher as catalyst in the learning process”, in Festschrift Jan Sedivka, ed. by D. S. Mercer, Hobart, The Tasmanian Conservatorium of Music, 1982
- Jan Mařàk–Viktor Nopp, Housle, Prague, Hudební matice Umělecké besedy, 1944, p. 61
- Elisabeth Morgan, “String Teaching: an extended perspective”, in Festschrift Jan Sedivka, ed. by D. S. Mercer, Hobart, The Tasmanian Conservatorium of Music, 1982, pp. 100–109
- Elinor Morrisby, Up is down, a life of violinist Jan Sedivka, Melbourne, 2008
- Marina Louise Phillips, An assessment of the contribution to Australian string pedagogy and performance of Jan Sedivka, PhD diss., 2001
