= Confederation of Australian International Arts Festivals =

Peak body for major international arts festivals in Australia

- Abbreviation: CAIAF
- Formation: 1997; 29 years ago
- Type: Not-for-profit incorporated association
- Purpose: Arts festival coordination, co-commissioning, and administration of the Major Festivals Initiative
- Location: Australia
- Region served: Australia and New Zealand
- Chair: Katrina Sedgwick OAM
- Website: www.caiaf.org.au

The Confederation of Australian International Arts Festivals (CAIAF) is a not-for-profit incorporated association representing Australia's major state- and territory-based international multi-arts festivals.

Established in 1997, the organisation coordinates collaborative commissioning, international touring logistics, and sector advocacy among its member festivals, and administers the Australian Government's Major Festivals Initiative (MFI) on behalf of Creative Australia.

== History ==
CAIAF was founded through the necessity in formalising cooperation among Australia's flagship capital-city arts festivals, enabling organisations a platorm to share experience, international programming, joint marketing, and collective representation to federal funding bodies. In 2001, Tasmania's newly established statewide festival, Ten Days on the Island, became the first festival to join the confederation that did not represent a capital city.

In 2006, the Australian Government established the Major Festivals Initiative through the then-Australia Council for the Arts (now Creative Australia), tasking CAIAF with assessing, funding, and managing the development of large-scale new Australian performing arts productions for presentation across member festivals.

In 2020, Melbourne's RISING succeeded the Melbourne International Arts Festival as Victoria's representative member following the latter's amalgamation with White Night Melbourne.

== Members ==
Representing six states and the Northern Territory, the CAIAF comprises seven full Australian member festivals, alongside two associate member festivals in New Zealand:

=== Full members ===
Festival	Location	State / Territory	Typical timing
Adelaide Festival	Adelaide	South Australia	March
Brisbane Festival	Brisbane	Queensland	September
Darwin Festival	Darwin	Northern Territory	August
Perth Festival	Perth	Western Australia	February–March
RISING (formerly Melbourne International Arts Festival)	Melbourne	Victoria	June
Sydney Festival	Sydney	New South Wales	January
Ten Days on the Island	Statewide	Tasmania	March (biennial)

=== Associate members ===
- Aotearoa New Zealand Festival of the Arts (Wellington, New Zealand)
- Auckland Arts Festival (Auckland, New Zealand)

== Major Festivals Initiative ==
CAIAF administers the Major Festivals Initiative (MFI), a federal investment program designed to support the commissioning, creative development, and national premieres of ambitious, large-scale Australian works that would be financially unviable for a single festival to produce alone.

Projects are selected through CAIAF's Commissioning Site (C-Site) and Development Site forums, where Australian artists, independent companies, and producers pitch works-in-progress to member festival directors and international presenters. Works supported through CAIAF and the MFI have included productions by Back to Back Theatre, Dancenorth, ILBIJERRI Theatre Company, Brink Productions, and Circa Contemporary Circus.

== Governance ==
CAIAF is governed by a board consisting of the chief executives and artistic directors of its member festivals, led by an independent Chair. Past chairs have included arts administrator Ian Scobie AM and Australian Chamber Orchestra managing director Richard Evans AM (2014–2026). Arts leader Katrina Sedgwick OAM was appointed Chair in September 2026.

== See also ==
- List of festivals in Australia
- Creative Australia
- Live Performance Australia
