= Lunch box (disambiguation) =

A lunch box is a container meant to store a meal for consumption.

Lunch box may also refer to:

- "Lunchbox" (song), by Marilyn Manson
- Lunch Box (film), a 2004 Japanese pink film
- "Lunch Box/Odd Sox", 1975 song by Wings
- The Lunch Box, a Thai chamber opera
- The Lunchbox, a 2013 Indian romance
- "Lunchbox", a political term in the United States referring to blue-collar voters, as in Lunch pail Democrat
