= The Divine Kiss =

Opera by Constantine Koukias

- Opera by Constantine Koukias
- Librettist: Constantine Koukias
- Language: English, Classical and Modern Greek, German, Hebrew
- Premiere: 1998; Brisbane, Australia

The Divine Kiss — The Evil is Always and Everywhere is an opera by Constantine Koukias a Tasmanian composer and opera director of Greek ancestry based in Amsterdam, where he is known by his Greek name of Konstantin Koukias. The opera explores the imagery of the seven saving virtues: prudence, justice, fortitude, temperance, faith, hope and charity.

== Showcasing talents of performers with disabilities ==
Commissioned by Access Arts Queensland and the 1998 Brisbane Festival, The Divine Kiss showcased the talents of performers with disabilities such as blindness and cerebral palsy. Singer in the 1999 IHOS Music Theatre and Opera production in Hobart, Janelle Colquhoun, said it was the most accommodating opera she had worked on since becoming blind.

The title plays on the way disability is perceived in different cultures. According to the composer, in some cultures people with disabilities are revered as having been kissed by God, while in others their difference is perceived as bringing God’s curse on society. “At any time, it is perception alone that creates reality and defines optimism or pessimism,” says Koukias

== Artistic design ==
In the words of the Brisbane News, commenting on the Brisbane performance in 1998, "[i]magery is all in this opera: in one scene, a giant seahorse floats amid a swarm of aeroplanes; in another a blind girl regards the starry night through an antique telescope; in another an astronaut staggers through a wall of fire and Father Christmas speaks in Hebrew."

== Text ==
The opera is sung in modern and classical Greek, Hebrew, German and English. The text is composed of, and devised from, translations, adaptations, quotations and fragments from the Old and New Testaments of the Bible; Martin Luther; Herbert Maly; Byzantine hymnography; Stephen Hawking; The I Ching by Chuang-tse; the Torah; the Divine Liturgy; Carl Gustav Jung; AION; Ananda K. Coomaraswamy; Monoimos; The Guardian; Charles Darwin's On the Origin of Species; Plato; Paracelsus' Hermetic Formula — "Similia similibus curantur" ("Like is cured by like"); and Job ix:20.

The pre-recorded tapes for the opera were produced from numerous recordings of workshops with Access Arts members in August 1997 and April 1998 in Brisbane, Australia.
