= Prayer Bells =

Choral piece by Constantine Koukias

Prayer Bells is a choral concert piece by Tasmanian (Australian) composer Constantine Koukias featuring dozens of handbells cast for the celebration of Australia's 2001 Centenary of Federation (see below). Also comprising three solo cantors and a small male choir, the one-hour work premiered at the Federation Festival of Melbourne in 2001. Since then it has been performed in Australia in Launceston, Canberra, Adelaide, Melbourne, Hobart, Wollongong and Sydney. It had its USA premiere at the Chicago Cultural Center.

== Structure of the work ==
The work is divided into 21 prayers, some of which are performed by bells alone, the notes of the bells being used to span the Latin, Greek and Hebrew chants intoned by the soloists. Prayer Bells is based on heterophony, as opposed to polyphony or harmony. This means that the melody or chant is used to create a harmonic accompaniment and structure to the chant. The bells are played in a variety of ways - rung, struck, bowed, rubbed and even dipped in water.

== Text ==
The majority of the Hebrew chants come from early parts of the Book of Genesis of the Old Testament. The background of the Greek worship service is to be found in Hebrew chant, especially from the musical theory and practice of Hellenistic Judaism. The Old Testament had a conspicuous place in the thought and worship of the New Testament Christian Church; Old Testament quotations and illusions abound in the literature of the New Testament, and Jewish cantors were often used to teach early Christian communities chant and psalmody.

The Latin text used in Prayer Bells does not come from the canon of the church but is rather the joyous poetic expression of two respected medieval scholars, Sedulius Scottus and Paulinus of Nola, from the ninth and fourth centuries respectively.

== Reviews ==
According to Gordon Kerry, Prayer Bells is the least dramatic and "purest" of Koukias's works, both in terms of musical style and resources required. Reviewing IHOS Music Theatre and Opera's production of Prayer Bells at Tasmania's 2006 Festival of Voices, Opera Opera's Kirk Hume described the effect of the bells as “intriguing and compelling – the sounds ascending like spirits into the darkness of the church’s high vaulted ceilings”. In the same review, Hume likened cantor Petros Kyriakou to a Greek Harry Dean Stanton, praising him as a "true vocal magician".

== The Federation Handbells ==
The Federation Bells Project commissioned the production of 2001 handbells by Anton Hassell and Neil McLachlan, as well as a permanent public installation now known as the Federation Bells at Birrarung Marr, near Melbourne's Federation Square, and a set of orchestral harmonic bells for the Melbourne Symphony Orchestra. Kerry describes the handbells as "extraordinary instruments, an attempt to bring together the traditions of European and Asian temple bells".

The handbells are believed to be the world's first harmonic bells. They produce a clear, precise note instead of the chordal sound usually associated with church bells, which means they can be fully integrated into musical compositions. Among the 1920 quarter-tone (chromatic) handbells ultimately cast was a set made especially for Prayer Bells, in which Kerry says they "create a luminous haze around the deep resonance of the male voices".
