= Alison Watkins =

Australian business executive

Alison Watkins AM
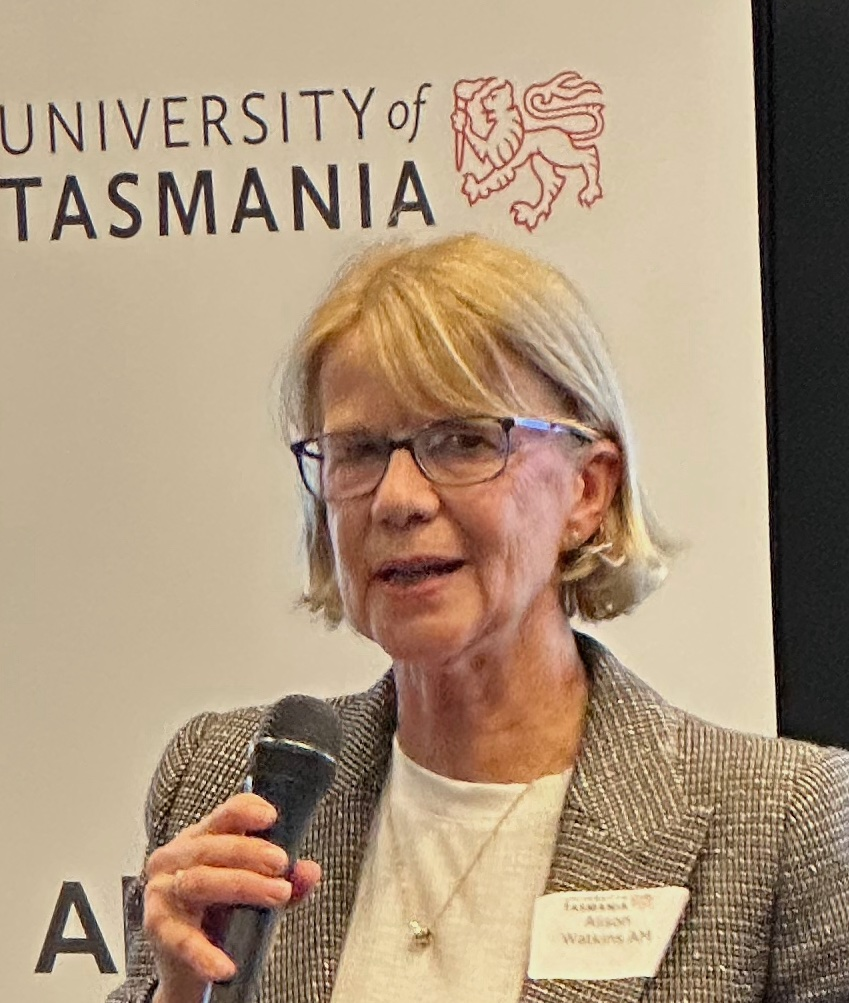
- Watkins in 2022

Chancellor of the University of Tasmania
- Incumbent
- Assumed office 25 June 2021
- Preceded by: Michael Field

Group Managing Director of Coca-Cola Amatil
- In office March 2014 – May 2021

Personal details
- Born: Alison Mary Watkins; 29 December 1962 (age 63)
- Education: University of Tasmania

Alison Mary Watkins AM (born 29 December 1962) is an Australian CEO and director. She has had roles at McKinsey, GrainCorp, Berri Limited, and was a group managing director at Coca-Cola Amatil from March 2014 to May 2021. She has been a member of the Reserve Bank of Australia Board since December 2020, having previously served on their Takeover Panel. She has also held a number of non-executive directorships, including at the Centre for Independent Studies. In June 2021, she became Chancellor of the University of Tasmania.

== Early and personal life ==
Watkins grew up on a farm in Tasmania, Australia. After boarding school, she studied for a Bachelor of Commerce at the University of Tasmania. During this period, she met her now husband, Rod, with whom she has four children. After their university studies, they moved to Sydney.

Watkins' son, Elliot, is a well known YouTuber by the name Muselk, with over 9 million subscribers on the platform. Her daughter, Ilsa, Is currently in a relationship with Australian YouTuber LazarBeam. Another of her daughters, Grace, is the CEO and director of Click Media, a group she established with a group of other Australian content creators and as of 2024 manages 83 well-known Australian creator brands and formerly managed LazarBeam.

== Career ==
Watkins' first role was Junior Associate at McKinsey, where she remained for 10 years. In 1999, Watkins moved to ANZ as GGM Strategy & M&A, shifting after 18 months to lead their Regional banking division. She then took a leading role as CEO of Berri Ltd. Her first non-executive directorship was at Just Group. The first listed company she led was GrainCorp Ltd., where she was at the helm for 4 years. She is a former group managing director at Coca-Cola Amatil and is on the board of the Business Council of Australia.

She was appointed a Member of the Order of Australia in the 2022 Australia Day Honours for "significant service to business through leadership roles with a range of organisations".

Academic offices
Preceded by Michael Field	Chancellor of the University of Tasmania; 2021–present	Incumbent
