= IHOS Music Theatre and Opera =

Opera company in Hobart, Tasmania, Australia

- Company type: Not for Profit
- Industry: Music / Arts / Entertainment
- Founded: 1990
- Founder: Constantine Koukias with Werner Ihlenfeld
- Headquarters: Hobart, Australia
- Website: http://www.ihosopera.com

IHOS Music Theatre and Opera is a Tasmanian opera company that was established in Hobart in 1990, by composer and artistic director Constantine Koukias, and production director Werner Ihlenfeld. It specializes in creating original music-theatre and opera works.

== Major repertoire ==
- Olegas - by Constantine Koukias, Libretto by Natasha Cica
- Tesla - Lightning in His Hand. - An opera in two parts, sung in English By Constantine Koukias.
- The Divine Kiss (Das Böse ist Immer und Überall) - An opera sung in Modern and Ecclesiastical Greek, Hebrew, German and English by Constantine Koukias. Dedicated to the memory of Józef Wawrzynczak
- To Traverse Water - An Opera in Two Parts Sung in Ecclesiastical & Modern Greek by Constantine Koukias
- Days and Nights with Christ - An opera by Constantine Koukias
- Prayer Bells - A concert piece by Constantine Koukias
- The Lunch Box - A chamber opera by Thanapoom Sirichang, sung in Thai

== IHOS Music Theatre Laboratory ==
In late 1999 IHOS formed the IHOS Music Theatre Laboratory, a sub-section of the main company that provides training for young opera / music-theatre performers, as well as commissioning and collaborative opportunities for Australian composers, directors and designers.

=== Works premiered ===
- 2007 As if Electronically Controlled (Full Premiere) Christopher Williams
- 2007 Colonial Pictures Simon Reade
- 2006 As if Electronically Controlled (Workshop only) Christopher Williams
- 2005 The Death of Chatterton Matthew Dewey
- 2005 Da Ponte in Absentia Constantine Koukias
- 2004 Blood Lights Ian Cresswell
- 2004 A Priest's Passion Matthew Dewey
- 2004 Succubus Michael Lampard
- 2004 For No Apparent Reason Myles Griffith
- 2003 The Fall of the House of Usher Maria Grenfell
- 2003 Creatures of the Wind Kate Moore
- 2003 Scenes from a Calabrese Opera Angelina Zucco
- 2002 Eden's Bequest (second stage) Rosemary Austen
- 2002 Harmony Allan Badalassi
- 2002 Touch Wood Claudio Pompili
- 2002 Antigone Sketches Constantine Koukias
- 2002 POP Sally Rees, Matt Warren
- 2002 A Lizard Between Her Breasts Raffaele Marcellino
- 2001 Happy New Ears Graeme Leak
- 2001 Death by Defenestration Joe Bugden
- 2001 Eden's Bequest Rosemary Austen
- 2001 Sway Lisa Morisset
- 2001 Slip - Synthetic Spaces Christos Linou Hugh Covill
- 2000 Images from the Life of Nikola Tesla Constantine Koukias
- 2000 The Tesla Project Constantine Koukias

=== Notable Laboratory Alumni ===
- Matthew Dewey - Composer
- Rachel Wenona Guy - Performer, Singer, Writer, Visual Artist
- Sarah Jones - Singer
- Michael Lampard - Singer and Composer
- Craig Wood - Performer and Composer
- Christos Linou - Performer / Choreographer
