= Hobart Chamber Orchestra =

Chamber orchestra in Hobart, Tasmania

The Hobart Chamber Orchestra (HCO) is a chamber orchestra based in Hobart, Tasmania. HCO was formed by a group of Hobart string players and conductor Reg Chapman in 1987. Annual programming of at least four concerts provides performance opportunities for student musicians, musicians pursuing other careers and semi-professional and retired musicians. The ensemble also provides soloist performance opportunities for Tasmanian Symphony Orchestra members and exceptional music graduates alike and regularly collaborates with the Tasmanian Chorale and soloists to perform choral repertoire. Guest conductors have included Myer Fredman, Jean-Louis Forestier, Christopher Martin, Gary Wain, Phillip Taylor and Joseph Ortuso, and the orchestra regularly performs under the direction of violinist, Peter Tanfield. The HCO has commissioned works by composers including Matthew Dewey, Don Kay, Dylan Sheridan and Thanapoom Sirichang.
