= Andrew Legg =

Australian musician

Andrew Legg is a Tasmanian musician and director of the Southern Gospel Choir, which he runs through the Tasmanian Conservatorium of Music. He is the Head of School at the Conservatorium, as well as a contemporary piano & keyboard tutor. He is also Director of Music at St Clements Anglican Church, Kingston.

Legg is trained as a classical pianist, composer and teacher but is best known for his work in contemporary music, especially gospel, soul and jazz.

Legg has worked with US gospel artists Myron Butler, Kirk Franklin, Horace Boyer, Marvin Weatherford and Xanielle Davis. He has undertaken postgraduate studies at the Tuskegee Institute and the Martin Luther King University examining African-American history and the growth of gospel music. He gained his PhD in 2008.

== The Southern Gospel Choir ==
Legg formed the Southern Gospel Choir and the "Very Righteous Gospel Band" in 2000, soon after becoming a staff member at the Conservatorium.

The Very Righteous Gospel Band includes:
Alistair Dobson (saxophone)
Steve Marskell (drums)
Randal Muir (Hammond organ)
Bob Tolputt (bass guitar)

== Discography ==
- 1995: Solo album Spark In The Dark
- 2005: Great Day with The Southern Gospel Choir
- 2009: High On a Mountain with The Southern Gospel Choir
