= Ian Cugley =

Australian composer

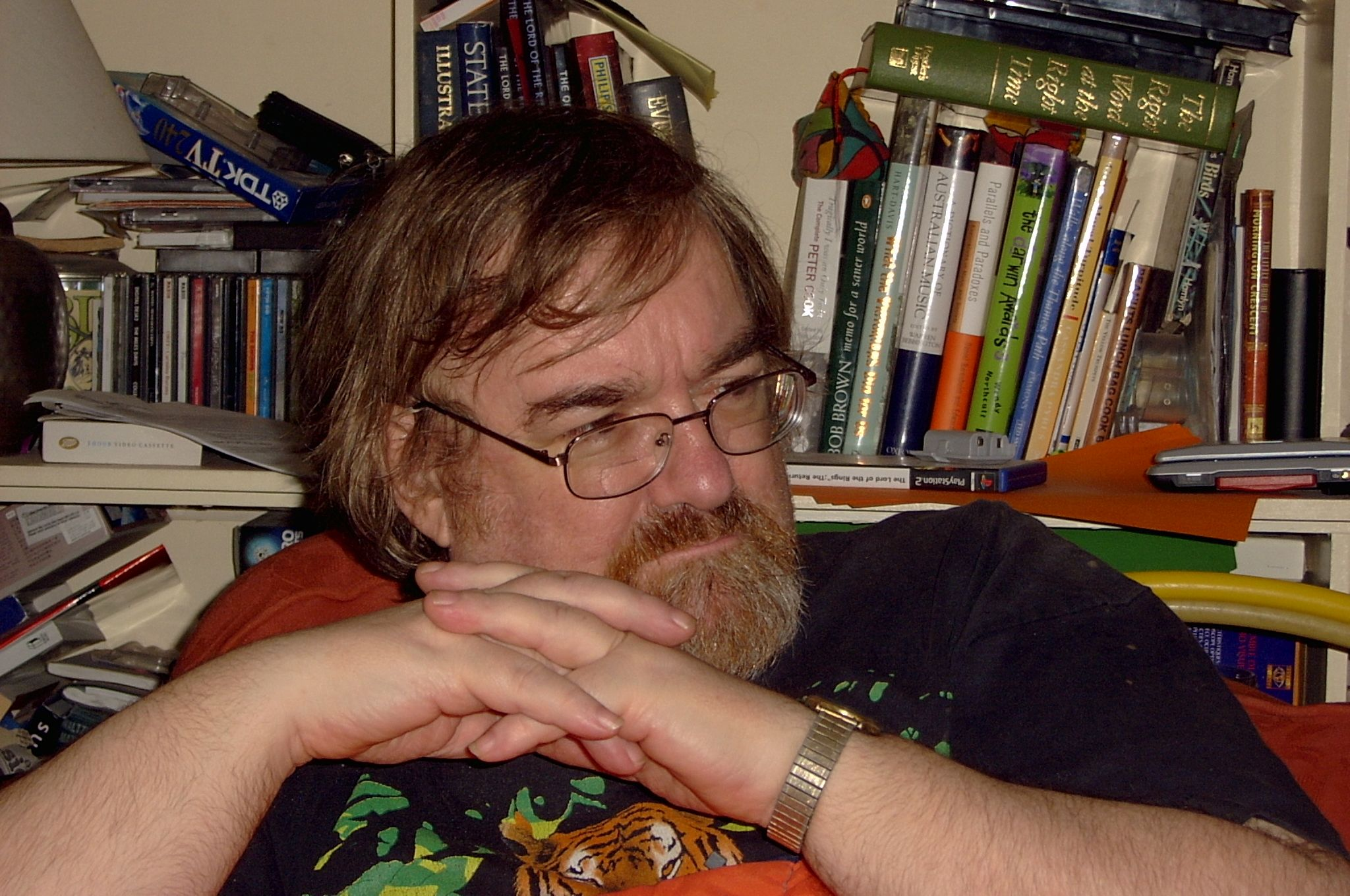
- Ian Cugley in 2005. Photo by Damian Cugley
- Born: 22 June 1945; Melbourne, Australia
- Died: 4 November 2010 (aged 65); Ramsgate, England
- Known for: Composer

Ian Cugley (22 June 1945 – 4 November 2010) was an Australian composer.

== Biography ==
=== Early life ===
He was born in Melbourne in 1945. He gained early prominence with two orchestral works, Pan, the Lake and Prelude for Orchestra, which were performed by the Sydney Symphony Orchestra in 1967 and subsequently recorded on EMI. His career after then was less spectacular, and he had a propensity for hiding away and concentrating on composition without seeming overly concerned with performance. He rarely attended performances of his music unless they happened to be close at hand.

=== Career ===
He lectured in Music and Computing at the University of Tasmania for many years, including a period in charge of the small Music department there, and was a percussionist with the Tasmanian Symphony Orchestra and the Melbourne Symphony Orchestra. During his time in Tasmania he wrote mainly chamber music, usually on commission for bodies or performers outside Tasmania. A notable exception is the Violin Concerto commissioned by the Tasmanian Conservatorium of Music for Jan Sedivka, who was soloist at the first performance in 1980 (with the Tasmanian Symphony Orchestra conducted by Patrick Thomas).

Cugley left Tasmania in the early 1980s to go to the United Kingdom and virtually disappeared into the Dorset countryside, gaining a meagre income by selling his watercolour paintings, and then as a part-time lecturer in computing in Bournemouth and London.

Unable to work for many years because of illness, he broke his silence and returned to composing only in the last years of his life. Since he was largely forgotten in his own country, and unknown in the UK, performances were few. He regarded this as an advantage, not only because he resented the work involved in preparing for performance as a distraction from composing itself, but also because he was acutely shy and hated being present when his music was performed. He claimed to hear only the wrong notes when his music was played.

In 2010 he was working again on a set of symphonies first started in 1973. His stated ambition was to die before they were complete, to save all the fuss associated with performance.

He died in November 2010, aged 65.

== Selected works ==
- Three Fragments for cello flute and piano (1963)
- Pan the Lake (1965)
- Prelude for orchestra (1965)
- Three pieces for chamber orchestra
- Aquarelles, four pieces for piano
- Chamber Symphony
- String Quartet No. 1
- Nocturne for Two Guitars
- Miscellaneous Pieces in Imitation of The Fall of the Flowers
- Kinderspiel
- Gloria Tibi Trinitas (1976)
- Alma redemptoris mater for recorders, instrumental ensemble, Female choir
- This is the Truth sent from Above: for recorder, oboe, cello and baritone
- Creation: contemporary dance
- Sea Changes: one-act opera
- Fanfare
- Three little pieces for clarinet and piano
- Little Suite for Brass
- Concerto for violin and orchestra
- Chaconne for orchestra

Cugley won the 2006 Accomplished Composer prize in the Notion Realize Music Challenge for Earth Ritual (then entitled just Ritual). A realisation of the work made with Notion software (a condition of the competition) is to be found on the competition web site.
