= Raffaele Marcellino =

'Raffaele Marcellino (b. 1964) is an Australian composer, academic, and senior education executive. His musical output encompasses contemporary opera, choral works, chamber music, and instrumental suites. Alongside his creative practice, Marcellino has held several high-level corporate and academic leadership roles within the Australian tertiary and vocational education sectors.

== Early life and education ==
Marcellino was born and raised in Sydney, Australia. His ancestry, through both parents, is from Calabria in Southern Italy. He completed his secondary schooling at Holy Cross College Ryde in Sydney. He received his formal musical training at the Sydney Conservatorium of Music, graduating from the Sydney Conservatorium of Music with a Bachelor of Music with merit in 1985. His teachers included Richard Vella, Richard Toop, Gillian Whitehead, Martin Wesley-Smith and Bozidar Kos. It was during his training developed an artistic philosophy that he later described as prioritising "idiosyncrasy over ideology and wit rather than obscurity.""Artist Profile: Raffaele Marcellino". Navona Records.

Marcellino subsequently earned a Graduate Diploma of Education from the Sydney Institute of Education and later a doctorate from the University of Tasmania. To support his transition into academic and corporate leadership, he later completed professional executive education courses at the Harvard University Graduate School of Education and INSEAD Singapore.

Among his early public performances are Incunabula (1985) performed by the Sydney Symphony Orchestra conducted by Patrick Thomas and Masquerade. Antipodes (1987), an orchestral work inspired by David Malouf's collection of short stories, was performed by the Tasmanian Symphony Orchestra conducted by Dobbs Franks.

== Career ==
In 1995, Marcellino joined the staff of the Tasmanian Conservatorium of Music where he served as director from 1996 to 1998 and resumed teaching duties in 1999. During his time in Tasmania, Marcellino worked with community arts groups and served on the Board of the Inaugural 10 Days on the Island Festival and Zootango.

At the end of 2001 he left the University of Tasmania and returned to Sydney to pursue a freelance career and sessional teaching at the Sydney Conservatorium of Music. In 2003 Marcellino was Composer-in-Residence with the vocal ensemble, The Song Company, directed by Roland Peelman, who had previously commissioned several works. This residency culminated in the choral cycle The O Antiphons and was released on CD, widely performed and broadcast. Other collaborations with the Song Company resulted in Via Dolorosa (1994), a collaborative work with artist Mark Titmarsh performed at the Sydney's Museum of Contemporary Art with other artist-composer collaborations; FishTale (1995), concert work for voices; Sprung! (2000), for Musica Viva Schools performances; and Mrs Macquarie's Cello (2004), for broadcast on ABC Radio and live performance with texts from Donna Abela and Lisa Morrisett.

From 2003 until 2009 Marcellino was the Principal of the Australian Institute of Music in Sydney. In 2010 he became Foundation Dean of the Australian College of the Arts Collarts in Melbourne. After establishing Collarts as a degree-granting institution, he was appointed Dean of Macleay College in Sydney in 2011. In 2013 he was appointed Director of Academic and Student Services for SAE Australia. In 2015 Marcellino was appointed Chief Academic Officer for SAE Global based in Oxford in the UK. In 2017 Marcellino returned to Sydney to take up the role of Provost for the Navitas Careers and Industry Division. In 2022, Marcellino was appointed Executive Director, Education and Skills, Sydney Region and then foundation Executive Director, Learning and Teaching of the faculty of Creative, Cultural and Experience Services at TAFE NSW. Creative collaborations have included Australian artists including Greg White (composer), Robert Jarman (actor, writer and theatre-maker), Jenny Duck-Chong (singer and music presenter), Roland Peelman (conductor and music director), Anna Messariti (producer and theatre maker), The Song Company, Sirens Ensemble, Tom O'Kelly (percussionist), and Jordie Albiston (poet).

== Collaborations and publications ==
Marcellino's music has been published by Reed Music, Currency Press, Opus House Press, Red House Editions, Grevillea Press and ABC Classics/Universal Music.

== See also ==
List of Australian composers

Music of Australia

Marcellino's complete compositional catalog is documented by the Australian Music Centre.

== Awards ==
- Music Fellowship awarded by the Music Board of the Australia Council (April 2003)
- Paul Lowin Song Cycle Prize (1999), First Prize for Canticle
- Paul Lowin Song Cycle Prize (1997), Highly Commended for FishTale
