= Old Nick Company =

The Old Nick Company, established in 1948, is one of the longest standing theatre companies in Tasmania. It stages the popular annual Uni revue and student 'Summer School' among other smaller productions. Past members include actor Essie Davis, Charles Wooley from the Australian 60 Minutes, journalist Helene Chung Martin, and theatre director Roger Hodgman.
