= Jocelyn McPhie =

Australian volcanologist

Jocelyn McPhie is a specialist in the application of volcanology to exploration for ore deposits. She is an adjunct professor of volcanology in Earth Sciences and the Centre for Ore Deposit and Exploration Studies (CODES) at the University of Tasmania in Hobart, Australia. Her research expertise is in reconstructing the history of volcanoes based on field data, improving understanding of submarine volcanoes, and examining the relationship between volcanic and hydrothermal processes. Her work on links between volcanism and mineral deposits redefined how the minerals industry explores for volcanic-hosted ore deposits.

== Education ==
McPhie completed a Bachelor of Arts with Honours at Macquarie University in Sydney, Australia in 1977, and PhD at University of New England in Armidale, Australia in 1985. The topic of her PhD thesis was 'Late Paleozoic volcanic sequences in the New England Orogen'.

== Career ==
In 1985, Jocelyn McPhie was awarded a Fulbright Fellowship to research voluminous crystal-rich intra-caldera ignimbrite based at the Hawaii Institute of Geophysics of the University of Texas. In 1987, she returned to Australia, where she was awarded a Queen Elizabeth II Fellowship for research activities at the Bureau of Mineral Resources, Geology and Geophysics (now Geoscience Australia) in Canberra. She was awarded an Alexander von Humboldt Fellowship, which she took up in 1992 at Christian-Albrechts-Universität, in Kiel, Germany.

After completing these post-doctoral fellowships, McPhie was appointed as a lecturer in volcanology in 1990 at the Centre for Ore Deposit and Exploration Studies (CODES), University of Tasmania, where she spent the remainder of her career. In 1994, she was promoted to senior lecturer and became the most senior female academic staff member in the Faculty of Science, Engineering and Technology at the university at the time. She was then promoted to associate professor in 2001, and professor in 2005. McPhie was deputy head of Earth Sciences from 2008 to 2012, and head of Earth Sciences from 2012 to 2015 at the University of Tasmania. Throughout her career she has supervised over 25 PhD students, 45 Honours students, and designed and delivered numerous undergraduate courses.

McPhie retired in 2015, but retains an adjunct professor position in the School of Earth Sciences and CODES at the University of Tasmania. She also consults for the mining and mineral exploration industry through her firm McPhie Volcanology.

== Research ==
McPhie's research focuses on fundamental physical volcanology, both land and submarine volcanoes, especially the interaction of submarine volcanos with seawater and marine sediments . Her applied research studies the way volcanic ore deposits are formed by the interaction of volcanic and hydrothermal circulation processes. She developed a systematic approach to understanding complex volcanic formations that links volcanic processes with the visible textures and structures in volcanic rocks.

Her work on the Olympic Dam deposit in South Australia clarified the role of volcanism in formation of ore deposits, reappraising models for ore genesis and expanding the possibilities for exploration of volcanic ore deposits.

== Publications ==
She has published over 100 papers in peer-reviewed scientific journals.

She is senior author of the book Volcanic Textures. She also authored two chapters in the Encyclopedia of Volcanoes.

== Honours ==
McPhie has received the Twelvetrees Medal of the Geological Society of Australia in 2019 She is an elected Fellow of the Australian Academy of Technology and Engineering, Geological Society of Australia, American Geophysical Union, and International Association for Volcanology and Chemistry of the Earth's Interior.
