= Helene Chung Martin =

Australian journalist

Helene Dorothy Chung (born 20 January 1945) is an Australian journalist and author (also known as Helene Chung Martin). She is a former Beijing correspondent, the first female posted abroad by the Australian Broadcasting Corporation (ABC). She was formerly an adjunct research fellow at Monash Asia Institute, Melbourne, and is the author of Shouting from China, Gentle John My Love My Loss, Lazy Man in China and her most recent memoir, Ching Chong China Girl, which is also an e-book.

== Background ==
Born in Hobart, Helene Chung is a fourth-generation Tasmanian Chinese, the younger daughter of Dorothy Henry and Charles Chung. In the 1880s her maternal great-grandfather left the southern Chinese county of Taishan (or Toishan) for the tin mines of northern Tasmania where, like so many around him, he became an opium addict. His son, Helene's grandfather, had no time for the pipe. He worked tirelessly in the tin fields and elsewhere, establishing himself as a fruit merchant, head of Hobart's Henry & Co. Helene's paternal grandfather came from neighbouring Xinhui (or Sunwei) County, began as a market gardener in Hobart and also became a fruit merchant, in partnership with Ah Ham & Co. and with his own firm, Chung Sing & Co.

Helene attended St Mary's College, Hobart, and graduated from the University of Tasmania with a Bachelor of Arts with Honours in History in 1968, and later with a Master of Arts in History in 1971. On campus she spent most time performing on stage or directing plays for the Old Nick Company.

== Journalism ==
Her first interview, on a claimed sighting of the extinct Tasmanian tiger, was broadcast on the ABC radio program AM in 1968. As a freelancer for three years overseas, in Singapore, Hong Kong, London and Cairo, in 1971 she made headlines with the first radio interview granted by The Princess Anne. Back with ABC, she joined This Day Tonight in 1974, so becoming the first reporter of Asian descent – and probably the first non-Anglo face – on Australian television. In 1976 Helene interviewed her former university classmate, history lecturer John Martin, who became the love of her life. She also freelanced for BBC, British Forces Broadcasting Service, CBS, Hong Kong radio, NPR and NZBC.

== Writing ==
- Shouting From China, Penguin Books, Melbourne, 1988, tells of her adventures and tribulations as a foreign correspondent. A 1989 edition includes her coverage of the democracy demonstrations.
- John Martin's death from cancer in 1993 prompted her emotional outpouring in Gentle John My Love My Loss, Hill of Content, Melbourne, 1995.
- Lazy Man in China, Pandanus Books, Canberra, 2004, a memoir.
- Ching Chong China Girl, ABC Books, Sydney, 2008, an autobiography.

== Additional sources ==
- Significant Tasmanian Women: Helene Chung.
- Tasmanian Tin Miners, Addicts and Merchants: Helene Chung Martin's account of her unconventional family background.
- ABC Around the World, History of ABC Foreign Reporting in China.
