= Michael Lampard =

Michael Robert Garth Lampard (born March 1986) is an Australian opera singer, conductor and composer born in Hobart, Tasmania.

== Education and early acclaim ==
Lampard undertook vocal study from a young age and acquired early notoriety as a boy soprano, performing in national broadcasts and with the Tasmanian Symphony Orchestra. As his voice matured it settled into the baritone register and became quite an unusually robust and powerful voice for his early age. He continued his study at the Tasmanian Conservatorium of Music with his lifelong teacher Suzanne Ortuso, where he completed a bachelor of music with first class honors. His rich vocal tone led him to early recognition in international competitions where in 2007 he was flown to Paris to perform in a competition for Plácido Domingo and in 2009 where as the result of being a major prize winner in the Australian Singing Competition, he was flown to the Czech Republic to record arias with the Prague Radio Symphony Orchestra.

== Career ==
Lampard has performed as soloist with the Prague Radio Symphony Orchestra, Sydney Symphony Orchestra, Tasmanian Symphony Orchestra, Hobart Chamber Orchestra, Orchestra Pasdeloup, Rome Festival Orchestra, The Melbourne Opera Company, Alexander Productions, Bel Canto Young Opera, IHOS Opera, Ice Breaker Productions (Adelaide), Daylight Robbery Theatricals, Tasmanian University Musical Society, Tasmanian Conservatorium of Music Symphony Orchestra and Concert Choir, Tasmanian Chorale, Launceston Philharmonic Society, The Friends Singers, Camberwell Chorale and the Hobart Orpheus Choir. Conductors he has worked with include Richard Bonynge, Plácido Domingo, Fritz Maraffi, Simon Kenway, Timothy Sexton, Jean Louis Forestier, Gary Wain, Myer Fredman, Carol Nies, Jonathon Grieves Smith and Simon Reade.

In 2005 Lampard appeared in the role of Guglielmo from the Mozart opera Così fan tutte at the Rome Opera Festival. Michael was selected through international audition and is the first Australian singer to be involved with this festival.

As a conductor Lampard has worked with several of Tasmania's musical organizations including the Hobart Orpheus Choir, the Derwent Symphony Orchestra and in 2009 Michael conducted, to critical acclaim' the world premiere of Thanapoom Sirichang opera "The Lunch Box" for IHOS Opera as part of the 10 Days on the Island Festival.

Lampard has also had success as composer having written several operas, choral works and song cycles. Many of his works have been performed in Australia and overseas including the premiere of his first opera Succubus by the IHOS Opera Laboratory. Recent commissions include a chamber work for piano quintet and voice and operatic mono-drama based on Edgar Allan Poe's The Tell-Tale Heart.

In 2010 Michael Lampard founded Hip-Pocket Opera, a small chamber opera company based in Hobart, Tasmania.
