= Tesla – Lightning in His Hand =

Opera

- Opera by Constantine Koukias
- Librettist: Marianne Fisher
- Language: English
- Based on: The life of Nikola Tesla
- Premiere: 2003; Hobart, Tasmania, Australia

Tesla – Lightning in His Hand is a large-scale opera about Serbian American engineer and inventor Nikola Tesla (1856–1943), composed by Constantine Koukias, a Tasmanian composer and opera director of Greek ancestry based in Amsterdam, where he is known by his Greek name of Konstantin Koukias, with libretto by Marianne Fisher.

== Plot ==
The opera depicts Tesla's life as a series of reversals of fortunes. The two-hour work, sung in English, is in two parts and features a bass, a tenor, a bass-baritone, two sopranos, seven musicians (including a theremin player) and a large male choir. Also audible are clattering typewriters, pigeons (in later life Tesla was deeply affected by the death of a specific white pigeon), Morse code and fragments of Antonín Dvořák's New World Symphony. It also included two Tesla coil as props at its premiere. A warning was issued in the program to audience members who might be wearing "pace-makers, hearing aides, or any form of electric, magnetic, mechanical or metallic implant or prosthetic device".

== Production ==
The full opera was produced in 2003 by IHOS Music Theatre and Opera. It was originally commissioned by the West Australian Opera and developed over three years through two staged "works in development". Creator and original Artistic Director of Tasmania's 10 Days on the Island Festival, Robyn Archer, commissioned the full opera to open the festival in 2003. The work, sponsored by the John Holland Group, was staged in a massive shed on Hobart's docks, where the Tesla coils put on a "spectacular display of electron sparks".

== Reception ==
Reviewing the production for the Melbourne Age, David Lander described it as "gorgeous image-based performance art with a fascinating, brittle score in which dilemmas are ignored in favour of sensuality". Tesla was featured on ABC Classic FM's New Music Australia program and has been cited as far afield as Croatia, where it was noted in a tourist board tribute to the scientist and Croatian Post's web page detailing a stamp to celebrate the 150th anniversary of the inventor's birth.

== 2003 production credits ==
- Production director: Werner Ihlenfeld
- Production designer: Maria Kunda
- Artist in light: Hugh McSpedden
