= Don Kay (composer) =

Australian classical composer (born 1933)

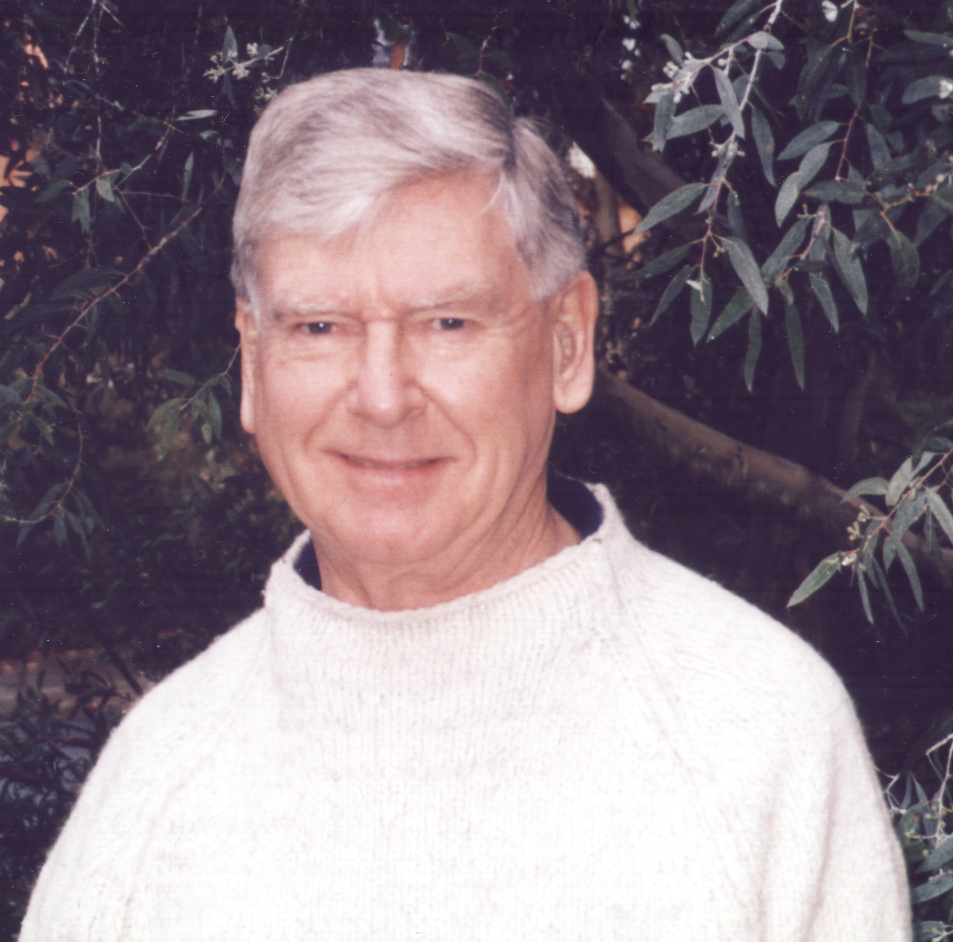
- Born: 25 January 1933 (age 93); Smithton, Tasmania, Australia
- Occupation: Classical composer

Donald Henry Kay AM (born 25 January 1933) is an Australian classical composer.

Kay was born on 25 January 1933 in Smithton, Tasmania. He attained a Bachelor of Music degree at the University of Melbourne after which he taught music at Colac High School, Victoria, 1957–59. He then went on to teach music at Peckham Manor Comprehensive School for Boys, London, UK 1959-64 and was director of music there from 1962 to 1964. He studied composition privately at this time with Malcolm Williamson. His first publication was in 1964–65 with Songs of Come and Gone for choir, flute, piano and string orchestra.

Kay returned to Tasmania in 1965 with a young family of two daughters as lecturer of music at the Hobart Teachers College. In 1967 he was appointed Lecturer of composition and music education at Tasmanian Conservatorium of Music. He received his first commission in 1966, Organ Sonata, broadcast on ABC national radio by John Nicholls, the Hobart City Organist, in 1967. Active as a music tutor from the late 1960s to the middle 1970s with the Tasmanian Youth Theatre, Secheron House, Battery Point, Kay also composed a number of scores for production by the Tasmanian Puppet Theatre as well as Theatre Royal professional productions e.g. Richard II (Shakespeare), The Imaginary Invalid (Molière), the Wakefield Miracle Plays (Tasmania Festival, 1970) at that time. In 1984 Kay wrote an opera, The Golden Crane, with a libretto by Gwen Harwood.

During these years Kay was also contributing to Creative Music and arts workshops at National and International conferences for Music and Arts Education. He was appointed Senior Lecturer at the Tasmanian Conservatorium of Music in 1976; elected Dean of Music, University of Tasmania, 1989; and elected Head of the Conservatorium of Music at the University of Tasmania in 1990.

Kay has had over 50 compositions broadcast on ABC national radio and over 60 works publicly performed in Australia, UK, US, Switzerland and Italy from a symphony, to operas, orchestral and choral works to chamber and solo works.

In 1989 Tasmania Symphony - The Legend of Moinee for cello and orchestra was awarded the best composition by a composer resident in Tasmania in the Sounds Australian awards.

In 1990 Dance Concertante for String Orchestra was given a similar award.

Kay's music has been said to involve themes of Tasmanian ecology and Tasmanian history.

In June 1991 Don Kay was appointed a Member of the Order of Australia for his contribution to the arts and particularly to music composition. In 2001 he was awarded a Centenary Medal for an outstanding contribution to music, music education and composing in Tasmania.

He retired from the staff of the Tasmanian Conservatorium of Music in 1998, having served as head of department from 1990 to 1993 and has since been appointed adjunct professor in composition. He now composes full-time.

== Works ==
=== Chamber ===
- Sextet, flute, violin, trumpet, viola, tenor trombone, xylophone 1962
- Trio, flute, oboe, harpsichord 1962
- Aubade, viola d'amore, piano 1964
- Three Bagatelles, violin, viola, cello 1964
- Six Miniatures for Piano Trio, violin, cello, piano 1967
- Elegy, violin, viola, cello 1970
- String Quartet 1 - 'The Quest' 1971
- Quintet for Flute and Strings 1974
- Three Canzonas, flute, viola 1974
- Proclamation Music, flute, oboe, clarinet, horn, bassoon 1975
- String Quartet 2 1975
- String Quartet 3 1978
- Scherzando for Two Pianos 1979
- Five Piano Duets for young players 1979
- Rapunzel – Paraphrase, violin, piano, narrator 1982
- Two ensemble pieces for keyboard players 1982
- The Waking of the World (String Quartet 4), string quartet, narrator 1984
- Evocations, clarinet, violin, piano 1985
- Rhapsody, violin, piano 1986
- Dance Cameos, mandolin, wind quintet 1986
- Hastings Triptych, flute, piano 1986
- Seasons, voice, violin, piano 1989
- Night Spaces, flute, violin, viola, cello, piano 1989
- Birthday Flourish, string quartet 1990
- Dance, violin, piano 1992
- Duo Pastorales, violin, clarinet 1993
- Love Voice of Moinee, cello, piano 1993
- Coolness, clarinet, voice, piano 1994
- Aestivernal, mandolin, wind quintet 1994
- Epitaph for Alfred, violin, piano 1994
- Concert Music for Viola and String Orchestra, rehearsal score (piano) 1994
- All through the night, violin, piano 1996
- Serenade, violin, cello, piano 1996
- Prelude, violin, piano 1996
- Victory Tango, clarinet, piano 1996
- Piano Trio - The Edge of Remoteness, violin, cello, piano 1996
- Saxophone Dances, saxophone quartet 1997
- Wild Call, oboe, clarinet, string trio 1998
- Scherzando, 2 pianos 1998
- Sonata for Cello and Piano, cello, piano 1999
- Blue Sky through Still Trees, flute, piano 1999
- Little Domestic Suite, oboe, clarinet, string trio 1999
- Memento Mori, string quartet 2000
- Meditation on Prelude IX, 48 Preludes & Fugues (Bk.1) by J.S.Bach, 2 pianos, vibraphone 2000
- Borders Within, violin, cello, percussion 2000
- String Quartet 5 - 'A Tragic Life', 2 violins, viola, cello 2001
- Two Southern Pieces, flute, piano 2001
- Memento Mori, violin, cello, piano 2001
- String Quartet 6 - 'On Truganini Track', 2 violins, viola, cello 2003
- Piano Trio - 'The Span of Time', violin, cello, piano 2004
- Cape Bernier, violin, cello, piano 2006
- Five Short Pieces, violin, piano 2006
- Summer Music, 2 recorders, baroque oboe, harpsichord 2007
- Wild Song, violin, piano 2008
- Dance Prelude, piccolo, piano 2008
- Sleeping Water, alto saxophone, piano 2009
- Sonata for Violin and Piano 2009
- Epitomes, clarinet, piano 2009
- Romance, viola, double bass 2009
- Mathinna's Lullaby, oboe, piano 2009
- Lamentation, brass quintet 2010
- ...the soft dying day, cello, piano 2010
- Triptych, alto saxophone, piano 2014
- Milestone Tribute, alto saxophone, piano 2018
- Update hybrid, flute, clarinet, alto saxophone, trumpet, trombone, percussion, piano 2019
- Allegory, cello, piano 2020

• Sonata, clarinet, piano 2021

=== Large Ensemble ===
- Variations, string orchestra 1963
- Practice Piece No.1, winds and strings 1968
- Three Pieces for String Orchestra 1969
- Practice Piece No.2, treble instruments/voices/tuned and non-tuned percussion, keyboard, bass instruments 1970
- Fanfare, double brass choir 1976
- Three ensemble pieces for young string players, string ensemble 1981
- Spiritual, 8 trombones 1994
- Rondino, string ensemble 1997
- Mathinna in the Red Dress, string orchestra 2007
- Spiritual, 10 saxophones 2010

=== Concertante ===
- Dance Movement, orchestra 1968
- Dance Episodes, orchestra 1973
- Concert Music, viola, orchestra 1973
- Concerto for Violin and Orchestra 1982
- Overture - The Inward Light, concert band 1986
- Dance Concertante, string orchestra 1989
- Concerto for Piano and Orchestra 1992
- River Views, trombone, string orchestra 1995
- Two Views from Hastings: Moonlight Ridge/Bush Tapestry, string quintet/orchestra 1994–97
- Rondino, string ensemble 1997
- Concertino for Clarinet and Orchestra 2001
- Concerto for Alto Saxophone and String Orchestra 2009
- ...in Brief, concert band 2013
- Dansatelle, piano and string orchestra 2017
- Piano Concerto 2, piano, small orchestra 2017
- Concerto for Trumpet, Winds and Percussion, trumpet, wind orchestra 2018

=== Orchestra ===
- Auspice Deo 1962
- Diversion for Orchestra 1970
- Land of Moinee 1983
- Tasmania Symphony - The Legend of Moinee 1988
- Infant Holy 1992
- Aestivernal 1996
- Symphony No.2 - 'The South Land' 1996
- March for the Republic 2001
- Variations on the Drover's Song 2003
- Symphony No.3 - 'Affirmation' 2007
- Symphony No.4 - 'The river and beyond' 2016

=== Solo Instrumental ===
- 25 Piano Pieces for young players piano 1961
- Piano Sonatina 1965
- Organ Sonata 1967
- Coolness, oboe, 1974
- For Shirley Harris, piano left hand 1981
- Cloud Patterns, viola 1988
- Water Pools, violin 1988
- Two Nature Pieces, violin 1989
- Two Nature Pieces, viola 1989
- Three Miniatures, piano 1989
- Wedding Day, piano 1989
- Two Mirror Pieces, marimba 1990
- In the Forest, piano 1991
- Idyll, cello 1992
- Introduction and Scherzo, piano 1993
- Legend, piano 1993
- More Miniatures for Piano 1993
- Threes and Twos, piano 1994
- Four Nature Pieces, cello 1994
- Dance Rituals, piano 1997
- Cradle Song for Emma, piano 1997
- Dance Rondo, guitar 1997
- Bird Chants, piano 1998
- Sonata no.1 for piano, piano 1998
- Melody, cello 1998
- Looking North from Tier Hill, piano 1999
- Three Lullabies, piano 1999
- Blue Sky through Still Trees, piano 1999
- Different Worlds, piano 1999
- Bird Chants II, piano 1999
- 45 for Russell, piano 2001
- Dance Rondo II, guitar 2001
- 5 - Alive! - 0, piano 2002
- Birthday at Rosemour Farm, piano 2002
- In Memorium - Malcolm Williamson, piano 2004
- Rosemour Idyll, piano 2005
- Now I'm Seven, piano 2006
- Sonata no.2 for piano - 'From My Inner Nature' 2006
- Sonata no.3 for piano - 'Capsules' 2007
- Sonata no.4 for piano - 'End Notes' 2007
- Simple Gifts (3 Short Pieces), piano 2007
- Sonata no.5 for piano - 'Full Circle' 2008
- Lazy Summer, piano 2008
- Sonata no.6 for piano - 'On D', piano 2010
- Sonata no.7 for piano - 'Of the Night', piano 2010
- Black Mary - 'A Portrait', piano 2011
- Lullaby for Alice, piano 2011
- Piano Sonata 8, piano 2014
- Intermezzo for Frances, piano 2015
- Bird Chants III, piano 2017
- Sonata no.9 for piano - 'The Call', piano 2018
- Extraordinary byways, piano 2019
- Sonata no.10 for piano - '- my answer to a question', piano 2019

=== Voice ===
- Six out of door songs, baritone and piano 1955-57
- By Wenlock Town, baritone and piano 1958
- Five Songs for Bartitone and Piano, baritone and piano 1961
- Four Songs from Robert Graves, high voice, piano 1964
- Five Herrick Epigrams, soprano, alto, piano 1964
- A 12th Night Interlude, baritone, string orchestra 1965
- A Lute with three Strings, voice, flute 1966
- Quiet Waters, high voice, string quartet 1980
- Quiet Waters, high voice, piano (rehearsal score) 1980
- Songs and interludes from 'The Golden Crane', soprano, clarinet, piano 1984
- Tasmania, SSAA choir 1989
- Four Miscellaneous Songs, bass baritone, piano 1991
- Two Encore Songs, voice, piano 1991
- Five Early Songs, voice, piano 1994
- Night Images, voice, clarinet, piano 1995
- Southern People and Places, voice, cello, piano 1998
- The Partridge Garden, voice/flute, piano 1998
- The Night Piece, voice, piano 2000
- The Ballad of Van Diemen's Land, choir, windband 2004
- Four Bird Songs from Shaw Neilson, baritone, piano 2005
- Five Songs from Robert Graves, high voice, piano 2008
- Aspects of the Vine, high voice, viola, double bass 2010
- Bird Songs, high voice, string quintet/orchestra 2011
- Lullaby, soprano, piano, 2012
- Lost and present love, baritone, piano, 2012
- Menagerie of birds, baritone, piano, clarinet, horn, violin, viola, violoncello 2012
- Four Reflective Songs, baritone, piano 2014
- The Earth Song (on words and melody by Bob Brown), soprano solo, SATB choir, orchestra 2014
- Country, baritone, oboe, piano 2015
- Three Penguin Summers, male voice, orchestra 2016
- The Muse - a fairy tale, male voice, windband 2017
- Envoy, voice, piano 2018
- Conflagration - 'a cantata in eight episodes', for SATB soloists, chorus, two pianos and six percussionists, 2019

=== Choral ===
- I sing of a Maiden, ATB choir (unaccommpanied) 1958
- Three Unison Songs, mixed voices and piano 1958
- Songs of Come and Gone, SSA choir, flute, piano, strings 1963
- The Battel (arr. Byrd), school choir and orchestra 1963
- Two Monodies for Male Chorus 1963
- Two Australian Choral Pieces, SATB choir 1963
- The Shepherd, SSA choir 1964
- De Profundis, SATB choir 1964
- Three for Three, SAB choir 1965
- O Waly, Waly, TTBB choir 1966
- To Musick, SSA choir, cello, piano 1968
- Two songs for 'The Witnesses' 1970
- The Wild Mountain Thyme, SSA choir, flute 1971
- Four Australian Folk Songs, SSA choir 1971
- Seven Songs from Shaw Neilson, SSA choir, flute, bassoon 1972
- Two Australian Folk Songs, TTBB choir, piano 1974
- Ladies of Brisbane, arr. TTBB choir, piano 1974
- The Death of Ben Hall, arr. TTBB choir 1974
- Lament of the Aboriginies, SA choir, piano 1977
- There is an Island, children's choir, orchestra 1977
- Before Sleep, SATB ensemble 1977
- At night, SA choir, assorted instruments 1982
- Northward the Strait, soprano, baritone, chorus, symphonic wind band 1987
- Song of Welcome, youth choir, symphonic wind band 1990
- Time Moods, a capella chamber choir 1991
- Gloria, youth choir, orchestra 1992
- Songs of Greeting and Farewell, youth choir 1996
- Excerpts (Three Songs), SSAA choir, piano 1996
- To Musick, SATB choir, cello, piano 2004
- Her Passion Tells, soprano, baritone, SATB chorus, strings 2006
- Northward the Strait (Extended Version), soprano, baritone, SATB chorus, orchestra 2007
- Northward the Strait (Extended Version), soprano, baritone, SATB chorus, symphonic wind band 2009

=== Theatre ===
- Incidental Music for 'Twelfth Night', string quartet and baritone 1960
- Incidental Music and Shanties for 'Treasure Island' 1962
- Incidental Music for 'The Imaginary Invalid', flute, viola, cello, piano 1969
- Incidental Music for 'Hansel and Gretel', flute, oboe, cello, harpsichord, percussion 1970
- Incidental Music for 'The Wakefield Plays', flute, 3 trumpets, trombone, violin, percussion, electronics, choir 1972
- Incidental Music and Songs for 'The Journey', flute, oboe, trumpet, cello, harpsichord, percussion 1972
- Incidental Music for 'Richard II', 2 violins, cello, 2 trumpets, timpani 1972
- Incidental Music for 'Once a Jolly Swagman', flute, clarinet, cello, harpsichord, percussion, prepared tape 1973
- Incidental Music for 'Click go the shears', flute, clarinet, violin, trumpet, cello, harpsichord/piano, percussion 1975
- Incidental Music for 'Big Nose', cello, percussion 1976
- Incidental Music for 'Rub-a-dub-dub', oboe, cello, percussion 1976
- Incidental Music for 'Ice Palais' 1989

=== Film ===
- Upon Reflection, violin, bassoon 1971
- Fountain, flute, viola, cello 1972
- By hook or by crook, string quartet 1973
- Walka crooked mile, string quartet 1975
- Ross Bridge, clarinet, string quartet, percussion 1977
- River of Lost Footsteps, flute, violin, cello, percussion 2000

=== Opera ===
- Rapunzel, opera for children's theatre, soloists, chorus, ensemble 1966
- The Golden Crane, vocal score 1983
- The Golden Crane, solo voices, chorus, chamber orchestra 1984
- The Bushranger's Lover, 5 principal solo voices, mixed chorus, flute, oboe, clarinet, bassoon, horn, trumpet, trombone, percussionist, piano, strings 2012
- Memento Mori, 2 principal solo voices, violin, violoncello, piano, 2018
