= Douglas Knehans =

American/Australian composer (born 1957)

- Origin: St. Louis, Missouri
- Occupation: Composer

Douglas Knehans (born 1957, St. Louis, Missouri) is an American/Australian composer. He is the Norman Dinerstein Professor of Composition Scholar at the University of Cincinnati College-Conservatory of Music.

Knehans is also the director of Ablaze Records, a company which records and produces music by living composers.
