= 5–7 Sandy Bay Road =

Historic building in Australia

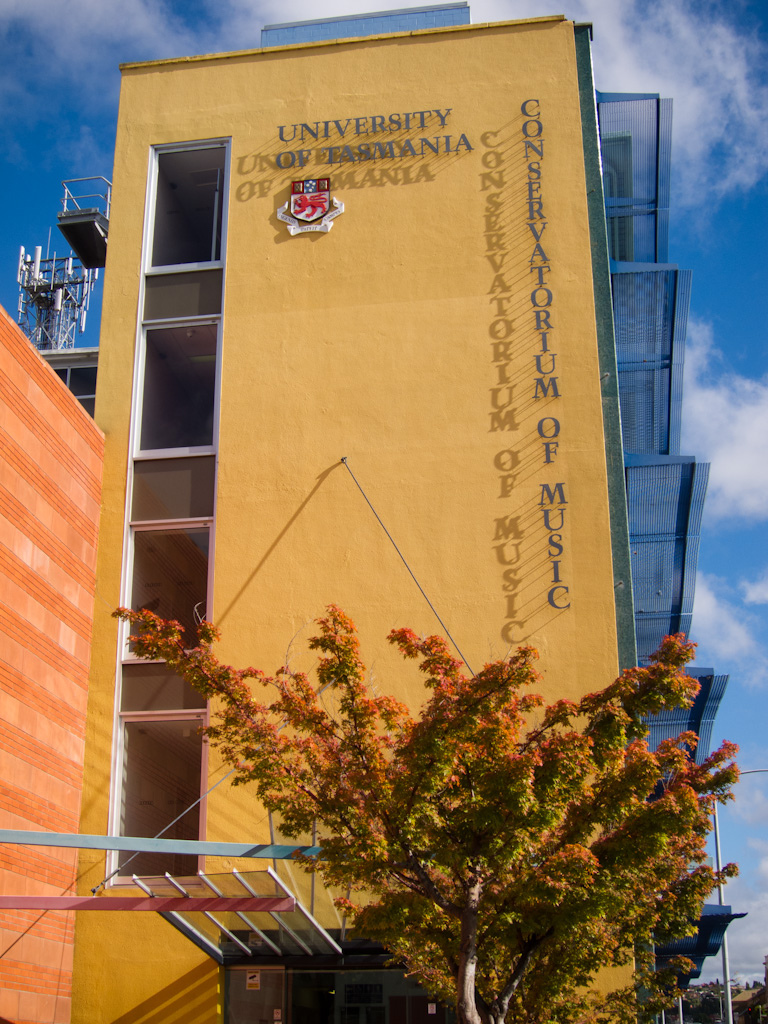
- The former University of Tasmania Conservatorium of Music building, originally the ABC studios
- Location in Hobart
- Former names: ABC Tasmania Broadcast Centre

General information
- Status: Vacant (approved for redevelopment)
- Type: Broadcasting studios (former), tertiary education facility (former)
- Architectural style: Modernist
- Location: 5–7 Sandy Bay Road, Hobart, Tasmania, Australia
- Coordinates: 42°53′12.89″S 147°19′40.56″E
- Construction started: 1959
- Completed: 1960
- Owner: Fragrance Group

Technical details
- Floor count: 5

Design and construction
- Architect: Dr Oscar A. T. Gimesy
- Developer: Australian Broadcasting Commission (original)

Tasmanian Heritage Register
- Place ID: 7,481
- Status: Permanently Registered

5–7 Sandy Bay Road is a significant modernist building located in Hobart, Tasmania, Australia. Constructed between 1959 and 1960 as the first purpose-built ABC-TV radio and television studios on the island, the building is noted for its modernist character, featuring a prominent mosaic mural by Tasmanian artist George Davis. Completed in 1961 and composed of over 150,000 glass tiles, the work is the largest mosaic mural in Tasmania. The mural’s abstract design has been noted for its resemblance to the ABC's "Lissajous curve" logo, and may have served as an early visual influence. It is permanently listed on the Tasmanian Heritage Register.

The building later became the home of the University of Tasmania Conservatorium of Music before being sold to Singaporean developer Fragrance Group in 2017. While the site remains vacant, plans have been approved for its redevelopment into residential apartments, with the mural set to be retained as part of the new design.

== Architecture ==
The building was designed by Dr Oscar A. T. Gimesy, an émigré architect from Hungary who arrived in Australia in 1949. Gimesy specialised in the architectural and engineering challenges of broadcast facilities and completed a Master of Architecture at the University of Melbourne in 1958, focusing on the design of television stations. 7–5 Sandy Bay Road reflected the technical and spatial needs of emerging radio and television broadcasting, including recording studios, video editing suites, a production control room, television studio and sound stage for television show and news broadcasting productions.

That same year, Gimesy was appointed Senior Consulting Architect to the ABC, overseeing projects across Victoria, Tasmania, South Australia, and Western Australia. His work includes other significant ABC properties, such as the heritage-listed building at Collinswood in Adelaide and the Ripponlea Studios in Melbourne, known as the "Dream Factory".

=== Heritage mural ===
External videos
- ABC (Hobart)
- Historic mural by George Davis gets a new lease on life on Hobart apartment building, (9 September 2020)

A defining feature of the building is its exterior mosaic mural, created by Tasmanian artist George Davis. Comprising approximately 150,000 Italian glass mosaic tiles and spanning 19 m (62 ft), the mural was the winning design of a public competition held to adorn the façade of the new ABC studios. The mural features stylised female figures evocative of the Muses from Greek mythology, traditionally associated with literature, science, and the arts.

The mural’s production was an extensive process, with Davis assembling the complex central figures on a purpose-built table before installation. The work has been praised for its lasting artistic merit, with Davis’s daughter, actress Essie Davis, describing it as "one of the great artworks I've seen in the world".

In addition to the main mural, a smaller mosaic panel produced by Davis as part of his preparatory work for the ABC commission is held in the collection at Home Hill, Devonport, the former residence of Dame Enid Lyons. Davis presented the panel to Lyons following the opening of the building, in her capacity as an ABC commissioner.

The mural is permanently listed on the Tasmanian Heritage Register (Place ID: 7,481) and is set to be retained as part of the building’s redevelopment.

== History ==
The building was commissioned by the Australian Broadcasting Commission to serve as its Tasmanian broadcast headquarters. Construction commenced in 1959, and the facility was completed in 1960.

By the early 1980s, the ABC had outgrown the Sandy Bay Road complex. The corporation noted that while the main building remained of adequate construction standard, it was no longer sufficient to meet the organisation's expanding requirements. Television operations had spilled into adjacent cottages, originally built as residential accommodation in the 1840s and classified by the National Trust, making demolition or modification difficult.

The ABC emphasised the inefficiencies of its fragmented accommodation, describing the site as "inappropriate" and unable to accommodate future expansion. The organisation advocated for the consolidation of its radio and television production into a single, purpose-built complex on the site of the former Hobart railway station to facilitate better collaboration and creative exchange. The ABC anticipated that rationalisation could improve staff productivity by approximately seven per cent.

In 1990, following the relocation of the ABC, the building was repurposed to house the University of Tasmania's Conservatorium of Music. The Conservatorium had previously operated from Domain House, a smaller historic building on the Queens Domain. The move to Sandy Bay Road provided expanded facilities, including larger performance spaces and teaching studios, better suited to the Conservatorium’s growing programs. For several decades, it provided undergraduate and postgraduate music education, including performance spaces for ensembles such as the Southern Gospel Choir and the Australian International Symphony Orchestra Institute.

=== Redevelopment ===
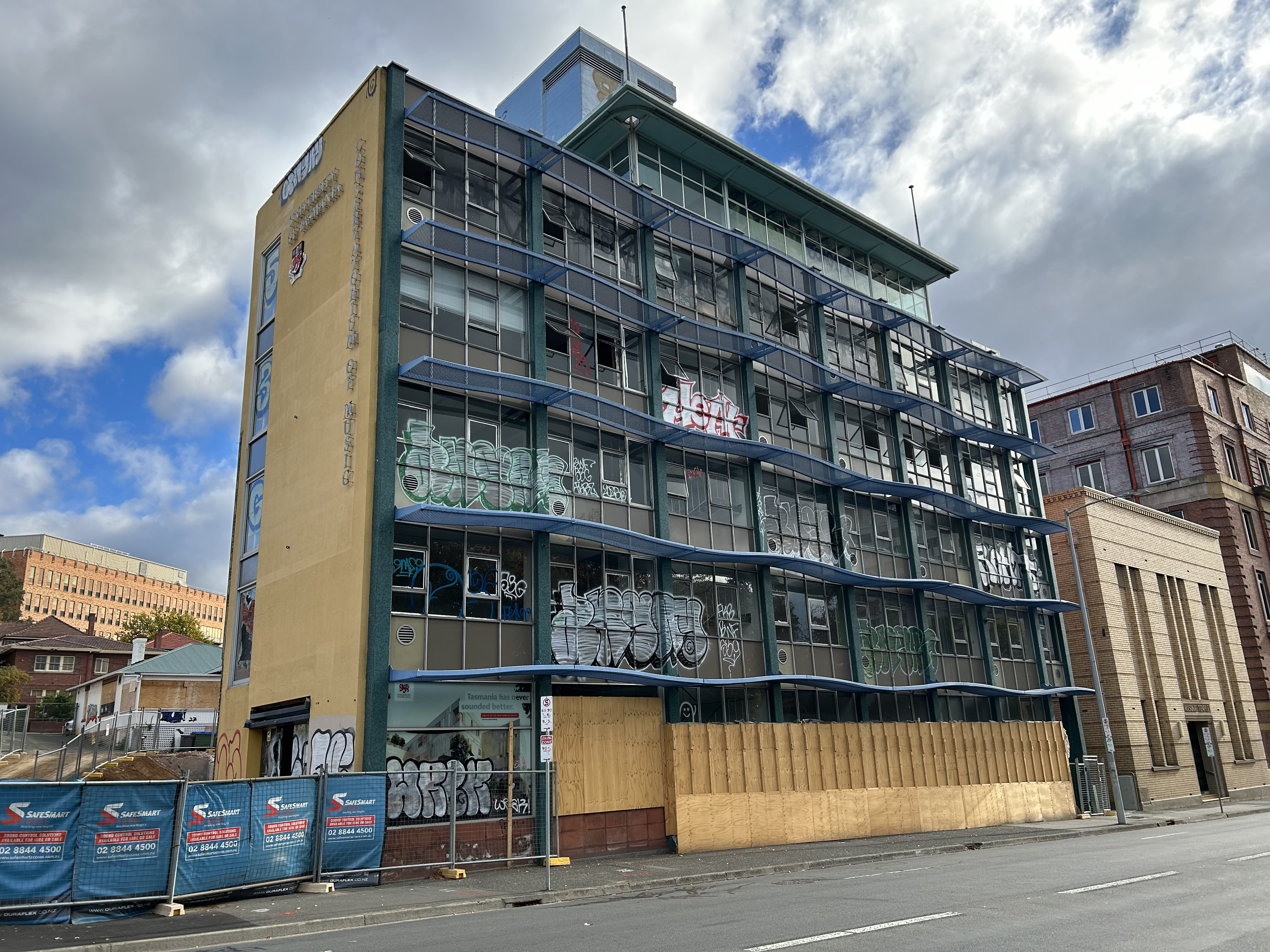
5-7 Sandy Bay Rd had been heavily vandalised by 2025.

In 2017, the building was sold by the university to Singaporean property developer Fragrance Group for $13.3 million. In 2020, the Hobart City Council approved plans for the demolition of the building and the construction of two residential apartment blocks. The proposal included maintaining the George Davis mural as a streetscape feature of the new development.

In 2024, the building became a focal point for public debate around housing and urban development in Hobart after remaining vacant for over six years. Activists from the Grassroots Action Network Tasmania (GRANT) staged a protest, unfurling banners reading "EMPTY BUILDINGS CREATE EMPTY COMMUNITIES" and calling on the government to intervene in stalled private developments to address Tasmania's housing crisis.

== ABC-TV programming ==
The purpose-built facilities at Sandy Bay Road supported ABC Tasmania’s expanding local and national output from the 1960s to 1980s. Designed for integrated radio, television, and technical production, the complex enabled the Hobart branch to deliver a growing range of drama, news, sport, and educational programs that reflected both Tasmanian and national priorities.

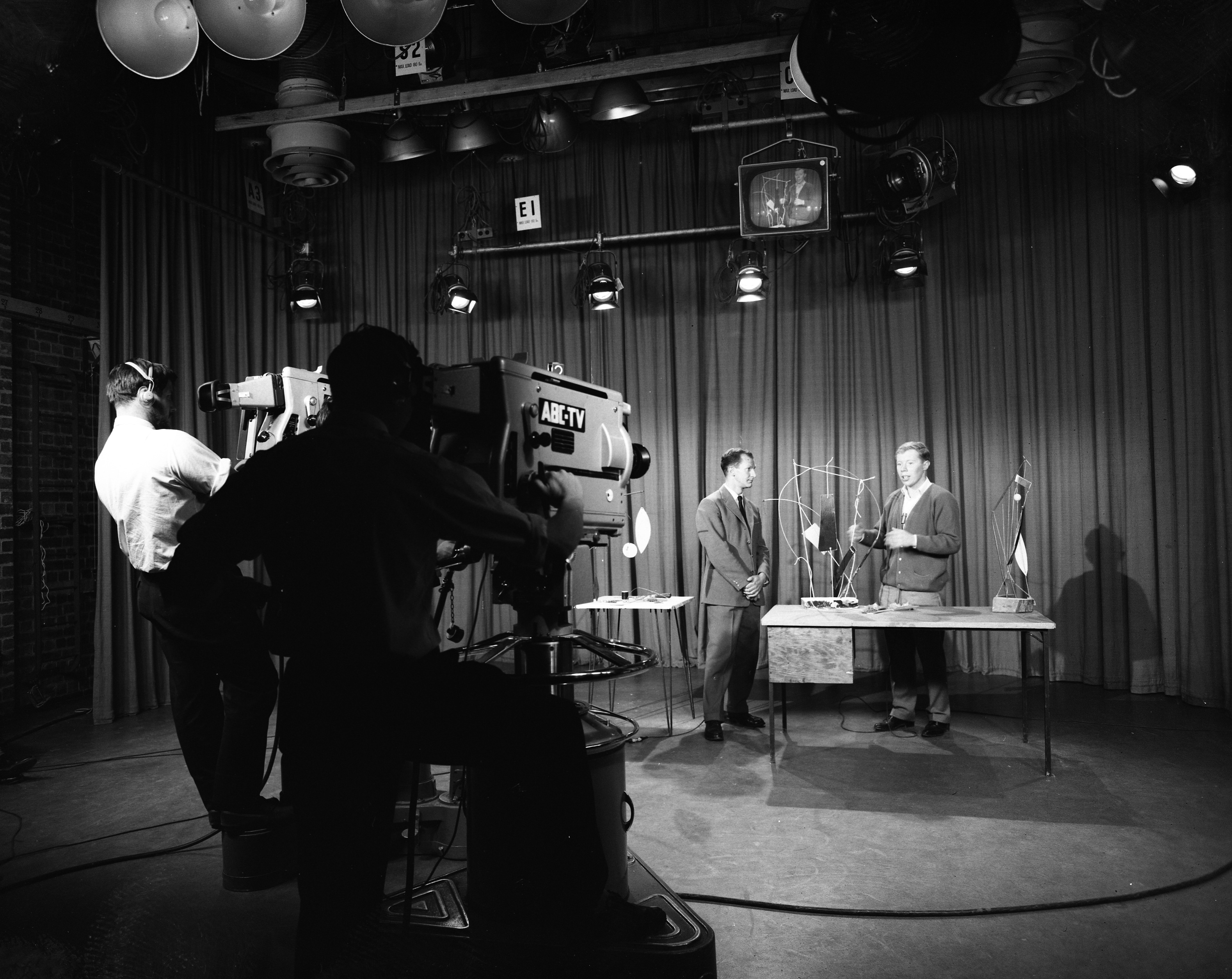
ABC-TV sound stage at Sandy Bay Road, c. 1963

Between 1985–86, ABC-TV in Tasmania produced its first half-hour contemporary drama, The Town That Died, a fully Tasmanian production filmed in February and March 1986. Based on an original story by short fiction writer Geoff Dean, the script was adapted for television by Julian Halls and directed by local freelance director John Honey. The production featured a cast of 20 Tasmanians and was filmed on location in the township of Cygnet in the Huon Valley. The branch also developed Sport in Question, a 15-part national quiz series produced in Hobart. The format, devised by the Tasmanian team, was considered innovative for Australian television, incorporating sports-related visual items to complement the questions and answers.

In the latter half of 1985, the Children’s and Education unit completed the 24-part infant science series Hunter, accompanied by the production of a support kit for teachers. Contributions to the popular For the Juniors series included a set of three themed programmes focused on items of clothing: The Amazing Hat Show (hats), Mr Sole ’n’ Eel (shoes), and The Coat of Your Dreams (coats). Additionally, three half-hour documentaries for music students were produced under the title Fern Chutney, featuring the Hobart-based folk band of the same name. In January 1986, the Tasmanian Folk Festival celebrated its tenth anniversary, which became the subject of a half-hour documentary broadcast nationally on Anzac Day. The state’s 15-minute weekly gardening programme, Landscape, hosted by Peter Cundall, gained broader popularity in 1986, moving to a new timeslot of 6.45 p.m. on Fridays. The year was also particularly productive for the Sports Department, with several new initiatives significantly increasing output. For the first time, the branch produced coverage of the Australian Football League Medal Count in 1985, taking over from commercial broadcasters. This coverage was awarded the Winfield Media Award for the best Tasmanian television football program of the season.

A new panel programme, Sport '86, focusing on local football alongside magazine segments and overseas sporting content, was introduced for the winter months of 1986. In late December 1985 and early January 1986, the branch again produced national broadcasts of two major yachting events — the finish of the Sydney to Hobart Yacht Race and the King of the Derwent regatta.

In 1988, the branch underwent a period of growth. ABC News and The 7.30 Report contributed to a recovery in overall ratings. The network secured primary live broadcasting rights for local Australian rules football, National Basketball League (NBL) fixtures, and several key Tasmanian championship events.

Between 1987-1989, the facilities at 5–7 Sandy Bay Road played a role in editing a range of national television series, including For Love or Money, Geoffrey Robertson's Hypothetical, Tall Poppies, the opera Don Giovanni, Krypton Factor, Music and Heritage, Between the Teeth, The Meldrum Tapes, and Sunday Stereo Specials. Programmes produced either partially or entirely in Tasmania included the youth-focused Chartbusters, Between the Teeth, Music and Heritage, For Love or Money, the local gardening programme Landscape, as well as Hypotheticals and Krypton Factor.

=== Awards and recognition ===
In 1989, ABC-TV in Tasmania received its first Penguin Award for the Bicentennial production of the Tall Ships race. Journalist Paul Tapp became the first Tasmanian television journalist to be awarded the Keith Walshe Award.

== Conservatorium of Music ==
In 1990, following the relocation of the ABC to new premises, the building on Sandy Bay Road was repurposed to accommodate the University of Tasmania's Conservatorium of Music. Previously based at Domain House on the Queens Domain, the Conservatorium had outgrown its facilities. The new premises offered expanded teaching studios, rehearsal rooms, and performance spaces, more suited to the needs of a growing music faculty. In May 1993, the University officially unveiled the $4 million redevelopment, with the building formally opened by Tasmanian Premier Ray Groom.

Internal modifications were undertaken to convert the building’s former broadcast studios and administrative areas into acoustically treated practice rooms, lecture spaces, and instrument storage. The building continued to serve as the Conservatorium’s home for over two decades, supporting both academic and performance-based programs. A number of student and professional ensembles, including the Southern Gospel Choir and the Australian International Symphony Orchestra Institute, regularly rehearsed and performed in the venue during this period.

The building was sold to the Fragrance Group in 2017 and was vacated in 2020 following the completion of the Conservatorium’s new headquarters at The Hedberg, a purpose-built creative arts facility.

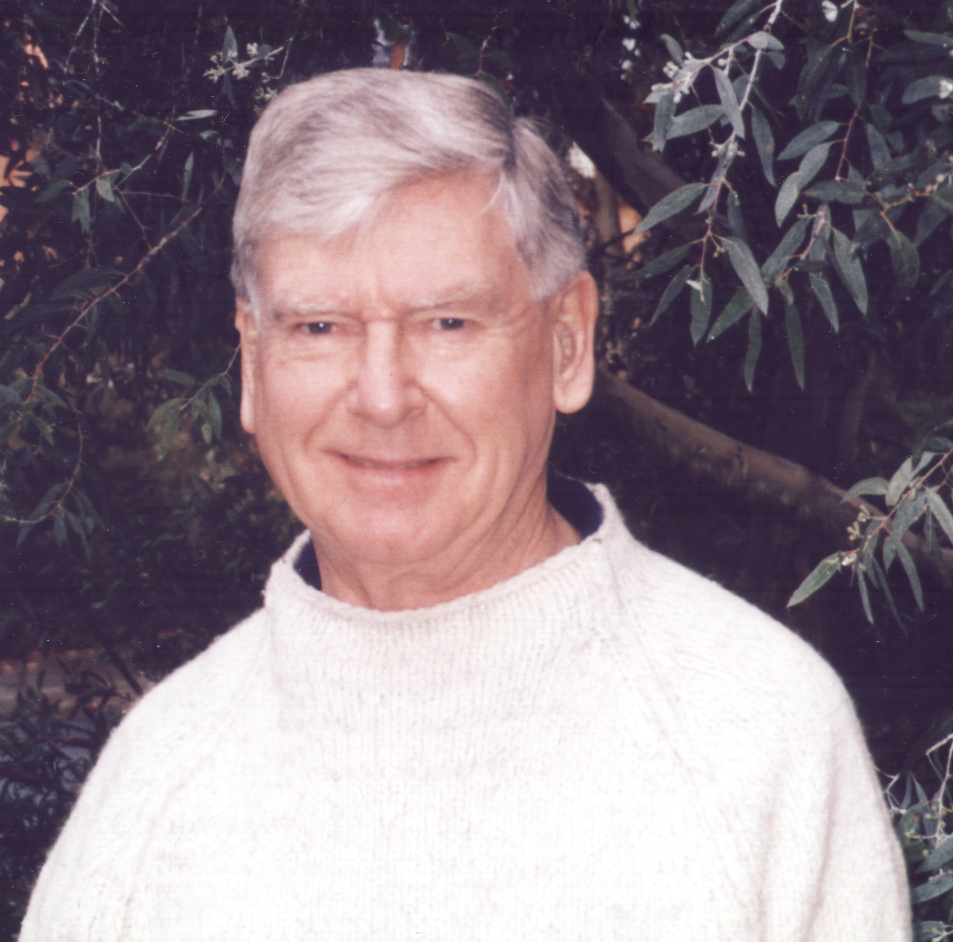
Tasmanian composer Don Kay served as acting director during the Conservatorium's relocation in 1990.

=== Leadership ===
Over its time at Sandy Bay Road, the Conservatorium was led by a series of directors and heads of school:

- David Cubbin (1985–1989)
- Don Kay (Acting Director, 1990–1993)
- Simone De Haan (1994–1996)
- Raffaele Marcellino (Acting Director, 1996–1998)
- Christian Wojtowicz (Acting Director, 1998–1999)
- Douglas Knehans (2000–2008)
- Andrew Legg (Acting Head, 2008–2009; Head of School from 2011–present)
- Kevin Purcell (2009–2010)

== See also ==
- Australian Broadcasting Corporation
- Tasmanian Heritage Register
