= Ten Days on the Island =

Arts festival in Tasmania, Australia

- Status: Active
- Genre: Multi-arts festival
- Dates: March (biennial)
- Frequency: Biennial
- Locations: Tasmania, Australia
- Years active: 2001–present
- Founded: March 2001; 25 years ago
- Founders: Jim Bacon; Robyn Archer
- Organizer: Ten Days on the Island Ltd
- Headquarters: Burnie, Tasmania
- People: Marnie Karmelita (Artistic Director); Kerry Sarten (Chair); Vernon Guest (CEO)
- Website: www.tendays.org.au

Ten Days on the Island is a biennial statewide arts festival held across Tasmania, Australia. Established in 2001 by the Tasmanian Government under Premier Jim Bacon, it is Australia's only statewide arts festival. The festival presents theatre, music, dance, visual arts, and community events in venues and site-specific locations across the island over ten days, typically in March.

Ten Days on the Island is a registered charity and a member of the Confederation of Australian International Arts Festivals (CAIAF). The organisation is headquartered in Burnie, having relocated from Hobart in 2017.

== History ==
=== Origins ===
Ten Days on the Island was conceived as part of the Bacon government's initiative to build Tasmania's cultural confidence. Premier Jim Bacon invited Robyn Archer AO, then Artistic Director of the Adelaide Festival, to create a new international arts festival for Tasmania.

Archer developed the concept of an exchange of island cultures, inviting artists from island nations around the world to perform alongside Tasmanian artists. The inaugural festival was held in March 2001, with events staged across Tasmania in over 50 locations.

=== Growth and evolution ===
The festival grew significantly in its first decade under Archer (2001, 2003, 2005) and her successor Elizabeth Walsh (2007, 2009, 2011). By 2009, attendance had reached approximately 195,000 across the state.

In 2013, Artistic Director Jo Duffy introduced the "Ten Festival Towns" model, concentrating events into ten regional hubs rather than spreading across dozens of locations.

Under David Malacari (2015, 2017), the festival broadened its programming beyond the island cultures theme. Between 2014–2016, the event was known as the Tasmanian International Arts Festival, in an attempt to make it clearer that the event as a statewide arts festival to international artists and audiences. By the end of 2016, it was again being called Ten Days on the Island. In 2017, the organisation relocated its headquarters from Hobart to Burnie on the North-West Coast, with additional funding from the Tasmanian Government to support a renewed focus on regional Tasmania.

=== Three-weekend regional model ===
Beginning in 2019, Artistic Director Dr Lindy Hume AM introduced a three-weekend format, with each weekend dedicated to a different region of Tasmania: the North-West, the North, and the South. Hume described this approach as "radical regionalism".

The 2021 festival was held during the COVID-19 pandemic, with an almost entirely Tasmanian program featuring over 450 local artists and community members across 15 locations. Nearly 36,000 people attended.

Hume's final festival in 2023 returned to ten consecutive days, moving through three regions: opening in the North, shifting to the South, and closing on the North-West Coast.

=== 2025 onwards ===
Marnie Karmelita was appointed Artistic Director in 2024, arriving from the Aotearoa New Zealand Festival of the Arts in Wellington. The 2025 festival ran from 21 to 30 March across Tasmania.

== Programming and notable works ==
Ten Days on the Island commissions new Tasmanian works alongside national and international touring productions. Notable productions and visiting artists have included:

- Commissioned and collaborative works:
  - Hide the Dog (2023), a trans-Tasman First Nations children's production co-written by Tasmanian pakana playwright Nathan Maynard and Māori writer Jamie McCaskill, directed by Isaac Drandic.
  - Women of Troy (2023), an Archipelago Productions and Theatre Royal staging of Euripides's tragedy adapted by Tom Wright and Barrie Kosky, featuring Marta Dusseldorp and Behrouz Boochani.
  - Goldfish (2025), a disaster-recovery theatre collaboration between Hobart-based Terrapin Puppet Theatre and Japan's Aichi Prefectural Art Theatre.
  - Fragile Matter (2017), a contemporary dance collaboration between Launceston's Tasdance and Greek company Jukstapoz.
- International and national headliners:
  - Musical acts including the Kronos Quartet (2023), Camille O'Sullivan (2025), Ashley MacIsaac (2011), and Emeline Michel (2011).
  - Theatre, dance, and visual artists including UK experimental theatre company Forced Entertainment (Table Top Shakespeare, 2025), New Zealand visual artist Lisa Reihana (2019, 2023), Singaporean theatre company W!LD RICE (2011), London aerial theatre company Ockham's Razor (2013), and Australian companies Dancenorth and Strange Fruit.

=== Regional reach ===
A defining feature of the festival is staging works outside major urban theatres in agricultural sheds, parks, beaches, and regional halls across Tasmania's distinct geographic regions:

- North-West Coast: Signature programming includes Big hART's Acoustic Life of Sheds, a recurring multi-hour promenade concert held inside working farm and tulip sheds along a 60 km (37 mi) stretch of the North-West Coast featuring musicians such as Brian Ritchie. Other North-West highlights include exhibitions at the Devonport Regional Gallery (such as Del Kathryn Barton's The Nightingale and the Rose in 2019), performances at the Burnie Arts Theatre, and closing waterfront celebrations along the Mersey River in Devonport.
- North and North-East: Launceston venues such as the Princess Theatre, Earl Arts Centre, and Queen Victoria Museum and Art Gallery regularly host major touring theatre and dance. Outdoor and site-specific events have taken place at Cataract Gorge, Launceston's City Park, and regional towns such as Exeter.
- South: Hobart programming spans venues including the Theatre Royal, Federation Concert Hall, and Moonah Arts Centre, alongside large-scale public installations such as the UK sound-and-light installation Power Plant in the Royal Tasmanian Botanical Gardens (2011), the Dreamgirls Art Collective's 30 m (98 ft) inflatable installation Taniwha Time Machine on the Bellerive boardwalk (2025), and Strange Fruit's aerial performances at Port Arthur (2011).
- West Coast: Regional screenings and community events have extended to remote mining towns such as Zeehan, where the Women of the Island documentary series was screened in 2019.

== Artistic Directors ==
Name	Festivals
Robyn Archer AO, CdOAL	2001, 2003, 2005
Elizabeth Walsh	2007, 2009, 2011
Jo Duffy	2013
David Malacari	2015, 2017
Dr Lindy Hume AM	2019, 2021, 2023
Marnie Karmelita	2025, 2027

== Chairs ==
Name	Approximate tenure
Premier Jim Bacon AC	2001–2003
Sir Guy Green AC, KBE, CVO	c. 2003–2015
Saul Eslake	c. 2017–2019
Craig Perkins	c. 2020–2025
Kerry Sarten	2025–present

== See also ==
- List of events in Tasmania
- Dark Mofo
- Mona Foma
