= Australian classical music =

Genre of music of Australia

Australian classical music has developed from early years in the Australian colonies, until today. Today, each state and territory has an orchestra and there are many major venues where classical music is performed.

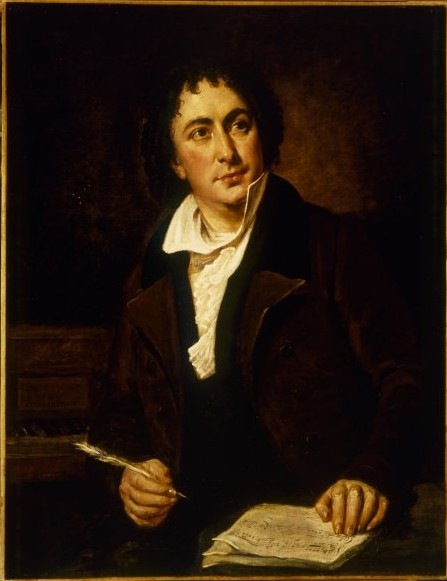
Isaac Nathan composed in 1847 an opera about John of Austria

== History ==
=== Early settlers ===
The earliest western musical influences in Australia can be traced to two distinct sources: in the first settlements, the large body of convicts, soldiers and sailors who brought the traditional folk music of England, Wales, Scotland and Ireland; and the first free settlers, some of whom had been exposed to the European classical music tradition in their upbringing. An example of original music by a convict would be an 1861 tune dedicated to settler James Gordon by fiddler constable Alexander Laing. Very little music has survived from this early period, although there are samples of music originating from Sydney and Hobart that date back to the early 19th century. Musical publications from this period preserved in Australian libraries include works by Charles Edward Horsley, William Stanley, Isaac Nathan, Charles Sandys Packer, Frederick Augustus Packer, Carl Linger, Francis Hartwell Henslowe, Frederick Ellard, Raimund Pechotsch and Julius Siede.

=== 19th century ===
Typical Australian salon music
"Reverie" (1913) by Alexander Rea (1831–1909) with lyrics by Albert George Dawes

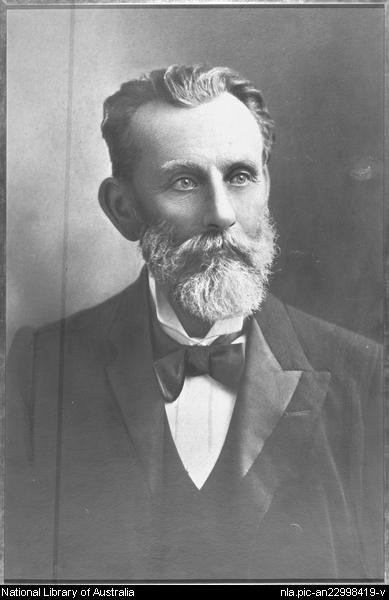
Hugo Alpen composed a gavotte in 1880 for Sydney University

Isaac Nathan's 1847 Don John of Austria was the first opera to be written, composed and produced in Australia. The establishment of choral societies (c. 1850) and symphony orchestras (c. 1890) led to increased compositional activity, although most Australian classical composers of this period worked entirely within European models and many undertook their training in composition in Europe or the United Kingdom. One of the earliest known composers was George Tolhurst, whose oratorio Ruth was the first composed in the then colony of Victoria in 1864. Some works leading up to the first part of the 20th century were heavily influenced by folk music (Percy Grainger's "English Country Gardens" of 1908 being a good example of this). An estimated 10,000 Australians and New Zealanders traveled to Britain each year from the late 1880s to the early 20th century, and the number doubled between the World Wars. A majority was likely female, often a musician; in 1907 one commentator said that Australia's principal exports to Britain were "frozen sheep and pretty-voiced girls". Success in London was often seen as a prerequisite for fame in Australia for singers such as Nellie Melba, Amy Sherwin, and Ada Crossley.

Australian composers who published classical music during the late nineteenth century include Hugo Alpen, Hooper Brewster-Jones, Thomas Bulch, Alice Charbonnet-Kellermann, George H. Clutsam, Herbert De Pinna, John Albert Delany Guglielmo Enrico Lardelli, Louis Lavater, George Marshall-Hall, Stephen Moreno, George William Torrance, Cesare Cutolo, Christian Helleman, and Augustus Juncker.

For composers at the time, a trip abroad could make a career: George Frederick Boyle, who was born in the colony of New South Wales in 1886, had a great career in Australia as a piano prodigy, but did not meet with international success as a composer until he traveled to Europe and the United States.

=== 20th century ===
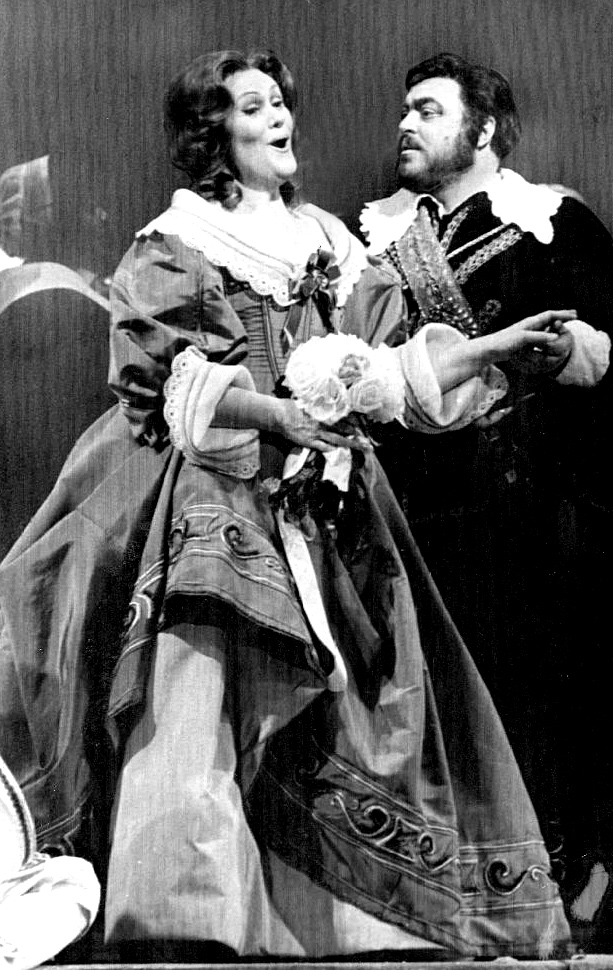
La Stupenda Joan Sutherland in I puritani (1976), with Luciano Pavarotti

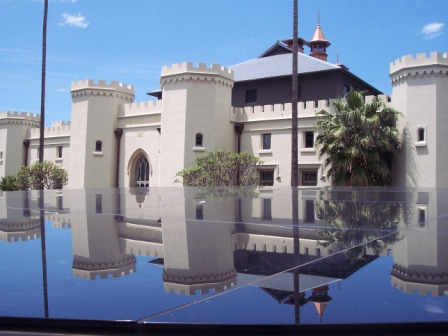
Sydney Conservatorium of Music

From the time of Australia's federation in 1901, a growing sense of national identity began to emerge in the arts, although a patriotic attachment with the "mother country" or "Home", that is Britain, and the Empire, continued to dominate musical taste. European musical training became more available in Australia through migrants like Alice Charbonnet-Kellermann, Fred Werner and as an academic pursuit under emerging conservatory academics like Ernest Truman and George Marshall-Hall. In the war and post-war eras, as the Australian national identity continued to build, composers looked to their surroundings for inspiration. John Antill in his ballet Corroboree, Peter Sculthorpe and others began to incorporate elements of Aboriginal music, Richard Meale drew influence from south-east Asia (notably using the harmonic properties of the Balinese gamelan), while Nigel Butterley combined his penchant for International modernism with an own individual voice.

By the beginning of the 1960s other strong influences emerged in Australian classical music, with composers incorporating disparate elements into their work, ranging from Aboriginal and south-east Asian music and instruments, American jazz and blues, to the belated discovery of European atonality and the avant-garde. Composers like Don Banks, Don Kay, Malcolm Williamson, Larry Sitsky, Martin Wesley-Smith and Colin Brumby epitomise this period. Others who adhered to more traditional idioms include Arthur Benjamin, George Dreyfus, Peggy Glanville-Hicks and Robert Hughes.

James Murdoch played a large part in promoting Australian music both at home and internationally, and in bringing Peggy Glanville-Hicks and Richard Meale back from self-imposed artistic exile overseas.

=== 21st century ===
In recent times composers including Barry Conyngham, Brett Dean, Ross Edwards, Matthew Hindson, Elena Kats-Chernin, Graeme Koehne, Georges Lentz, Liza Lim, Richard Mills, Carl Vine and Nigel Westlake have embodied the pinnacle of established Australian composers.

== Orchestras ==
State-based symphony orchestras, originally managed under the Australian Broadcasting Corporation (ABC) but now operating as separate independent bodies, have played a major role in performing mainstream orchestral repertoire for the general public as well as commissioning new works from Australian composers and ensuring that works by contemporary international composers are introduced to their audiences. These include the Sydney Symphony Orchestra, the Melbourne Symphony Orchestra, the Queensland Symphony Orchestra, the Adelaide Symphony Orchestra, the West Australian Symphony Orchestra and the Tasmanian Symphony Orchestra. There are also professional orchestras whose role is related specifically to opera and ballet performance, chiefly the Australian Opera and Ballet Orchestra based at the Sydney Opera House and Orchestra Victoria based in Melbourne.

There are several chamber orchestras which focus on works for smaller ensembles. These include the Australian Chamber Orchestra which tours regularly throughout Australia and has been well-received overseas, the Melbourne Chamber Orchestra, the Adelaide Chamber Orchestra and the Camerata of St. John's. Orchestral ensembles which concentrate on historically informed performance include the Australian Brandenburg Orchestra, Van Diemen's Band, and the Orchestra of the Antipodes.

Leading chamber ensembles include the Australian String Quartet, the Goldner String Quartet, the Australia Ensemble, Synergy Percussion, Dean Emerson, TRIOZ, the Sydney Soloists, the Southern Cross Soloists, Guitar Trek, Collusion (chamber ensemble), the Elandra String Quartet, the Zephyr Quartet, and the Tinalley String Quartet. Chamber ensembles involved in historically informed performance include Marais Project, Accademia Arcadia, La Compania, Ironwood, and probably Australia's oldest group of this kind, The Renaissance Players.

Musica Viva Australia, now the largest entrepreneur of chamber music in the world, was founded in 1945 and has provided a major stimulus for public interest in chamber music by organising annual subscription programs of concerts by leading international and Australian ensembles. Further interest has been stimulated by events such as the Australian Festival of Chamber Music which was founded in 1991 and is held each year in Townsville, the Melbourne International Chamber Music Competition and the Asia-Pacific Chamber Music Competition, held every four years in Melbourne, organised by Musica Viva in partnership with the Melbourne Recital Centre and the Australian National Academy of Music.

Several Australian composers have written chamber works. Among the older composers, Peter Sculthorpe stands out because he wrote 18 string quartets, with performances in Australia and overseas and recordings by leading groups such as the Kronos Quartet. In the next generation, Brett Dean, himself a violist of note and a composer who has received world-wide recognition, has written several works for various ensembles including a string quartet called "Eclipse" which was commissioned by the Cologne Philharmonie for the Auryn Quartet, a string quintet entitled "Epitaphs" premiered in 2010 at the Cheltenham Music Festival, the Santa Fe Chamber Music Festival, La Jolla SummerFest and the Cologne Philharmonie, and a sonata for violin and piano commissioned by Midori for performance in 2010 in Stockholm and the Wigmore Hall, London. Dean's near-contemporary, Julian Yu has written over 30 works for various chamber ensembles including conventional trios and quartets, as well as unusual combinations such as a quintet for four percussions and piano, a septet for flute, percussion, harp, violin, viola, cello and double bass entitled "Pentatonicophilia", and an unconventional reworking (Note: Although referred to by some as a "transcription", this work is described on the score as "a moderately modern rendition by immodest Julian Yu.") of Mussorgsky's Pictures at an Exhibition for 16 instruments.

Other piano and chamber works of special merit include Peggy Glanville-Hicks' Concertino da camera for flute, clarinet, bassoon and piano, Richard Meale's "Las Alboradas" for flute, violin, horn, and piano, Riccardo Formosa's "Vertigo" for flute (piccolo), oboe, clarinet and piano, Nigel Westlake's "Refractions at Summer Cloud Bay" for flute, bass flute, clarinet, soprano saxophone, violin, cello and piano, the piano works of Julian Cochran, Ross Edwards' "Laikan" for flute, clarinet, percussion, piano, violin and cello, Carl Vine's String Quartets Nos. 2, 3, 4 and 5, his Elegy for flute, cello, trombone, piano four-hands, organ and percussion, and "Inner World" for amplified cello and tape.

== Venues ==
The Sydney Opera House and Melbourne's State Theatre are the premiere venues for operas and concerts, and Opera Australia performs regularly there. Other venues for classical music, opera and ballet are the Queensland Performing Arts Centre in Brisbane, the Adelaide Festival Centre, the Canberra Theatre Centre.

City Recital Hall in Sydney, Hamer Hall, Melbourne, Melbourne Recital Centre, Perth Concert Hall, and Darwin Entertainment Centre are dedicated concert halls. Additionally, many regional centres have entertainment and performance venues which are used by state and national touring companies and individual performers, groups, and orchestras.

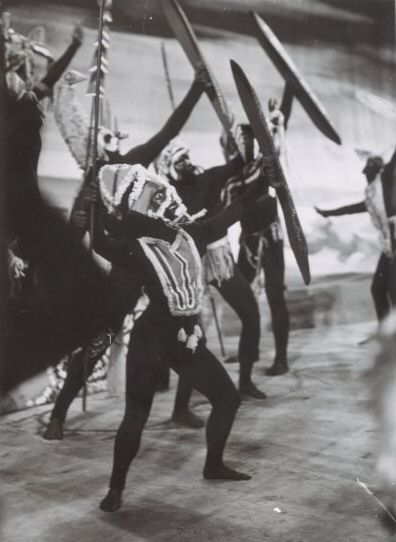
1950 ballet performance of John Antill's ballet Corroboree

== Broadcasts ==
Music broadcasting has played an important role in providing classical music and jazz to the Australian public. Prior to the introduction of FM into the country, the ABC produced classical music programs which were broadcast through their local stations. Professor Alfred Ernest Floyd's program "Music Lover's Hour" was heard for over 25 years, beginning first on the local Melbourne ABC station in 1944 before being broadcast nationally. Pianist and academic Lindley Evans broadcast a series of programs called "Adventures in Music" on the ABC, but was probably better known and more influential through his appearances each Thursday under the pseudonym "Mr Music" on the ABC's national "Argonauts Club" program. Ralph Collins, formerly a record librarian at the ABC with an acute knowledge of music, hosted his own national music program for over 30 years from the early 1960s, and he was eventually nicknamed "Mr Sunday Morning" by the general public. John Cargher, a record retailer, avid collector of records and author of many books, presented two programs. The most popular was "Singers of Renown", which began on the local Melbourne ABC station in 1966 and was transferred by public demand to Radio National at the end of only 10 weeks and remained on air for 42 years. The other program, "Music for Pleasure", began on Radio National in 1967 and continued until 1996.

The national FM music network ABC Classic was established in 1976 to broadcast classical music, jazz, operas, recitals and live concerts from Australia and overseas, music analysis programs and news about music activities. Its audience is now estimated as being about one million people, not taking into account a growing number of international users who access its programs via its online service. At about the same time, community not-for-profit FM stations were set up to enable volunteers to produce and present classical music and jazz programs. These included 2MBS FM in Sydney, 3MBS FM in Melbourne and 4MBS Classic FM in Brisbane. More recently a similar station, 5MBS. has been established in Adelaide.

There are five important classical record labels in Australia: ABC Classics Move Records, Tall Poppies Records (run by Belinda Webster), Melba Recordings, and Master Performers.

== Performers ==
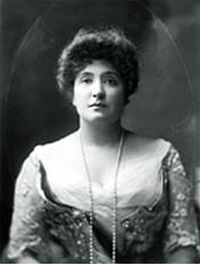
Portrait of Dame Nellie Melba GBE by Henry Walter Barnett

Well-known Australian classical performers of the past and the present day include:

- conductors Joseph Post, Sir Bernard Heinze, Sir Charles Mackerras, Richard Bonynge, Patrick Thomas, Stuart Challender, Simone Young, Geoffrey Simon, Benjamin Northey and Richard Gill;
- opera directors Elijah Moshinsky, Gale Edwards, Lindy Hume, Barrie Kosky;
- sopranos Dame Nellie Melba, Dame Joan Sutherland, Dame Joan Hammond, Marie Collier, Florence Austral, Marjorie Lawrence, June Bronhill, Joan Carden, Lauris Elms, Yvonne Kenny, Lisa Gasteen, Sara Macliver, Cheryl Barker, Deborah Riedel, Emma Matthews and Nicole Car;
- mezzo-sopranos Yvonne Minton and Margreta Elkins
- tenors Donald Smith, David Hobson, and Rosario La Spina;
- baritones John Brownlee, John Pringle, Robert Allman, Jeffrey Black, Peter Coleman-Wright, Teddy Tahu Rhodes (New Zealander);
- bass-baritones Peter Dawson and Donald Shanks;
- bass Malcolm McEachern;
- pianists Percy Grainger, Eileen Joyce, Noel Mewton-Wood, Nancy Weir, Geoffrey Parsons, Piers Lane, Leslie Howard, Ian Munro, Gerard Willems, Kathryn Selby, Simon Tedeschi, Lisa Moore, Geoffrey Tozer, Roger Woodward, Rhondda Gillespie, Stephanie McCallum and Michael Kieran Harvey;
- harpsichordists and fortepianists Geoffrey Lancaster and Paul Dyer;
- harpsichordist and multi-instrumentalist Winsome Evans;
- organist, fortepianist and harpsichordist Neal Peres Da Costa;
- violinists Elizabeth Wallfisch, Richard Tognetti, Dene Olding and Barbara Jane Gilby;
- organist Christopher Wrench;
- cellists David Pereira;
- harpists Marshall McGuire and Alice Giles;
- guitarists John Williams, Slava Grigoryan, Karin Schaupp;
- horn players Barry Tuckwell and Lin Jiang;
- oboists Diana Doherty;
- flautist John Lemmone, Jane Rutter;
- clarinetist Paul Dean;
- didgeridoo player William Barton;
- percussionists Claire Edwardes; and
- oud player Joseph Tawadros.

== See also ==
- Music of Australia
- Chronological list of Australian classical composers
- List of classical music festivals#Oceania
- Christian music in Australia
