= Melbourne Chamber Orchestra =

Chamber orchestra based in Melbourne, Victoria

The Melbourne Chamber Orchestra (MCO) is a professional Australian classical music ensemble based in Melbourne, Victoria.

Each year MCO gives over 50 performances including seasons of orchestral chamber music and works for smaller ensembles in its home city and on tour within the state, it runs its own chamber music festival, participates in other festivals and events, and runs workshops and masterclasses.

== History ==
=== Foundation and artistic direction ===
The orchestra was founded in 1990 under its original name, the Australia Pro Arte Chamber Orchestra (APACO), by oboist Jeffrey Crellin who served as its first artistic director. Crellin was also principal oboist of the Melbourne Symphony Orchestra (MSO), and because of the close association between the two ensembles, a number of MSO musicians also played in the chamber orchestra.

In 2006, after 17 years in the position, Crellin resigned as artistic director and was replaced by violinist William Hennessy who held the position until his retirement in 2021. In the Queen's Birthday Honours of 2018, Hennessy received the General Division of the Order of Australia – AM award "for significant service to music as a concert violinist, artistic director, mentor and educator".

The current director is violinist Sophie Rowell, appointed from 2023, and prior to that was MSO's concertmaster.

=== Change of name ===
In an Australian Financial Review report, journalist Katrina Strickland called the old name, Australia Pro Arte Chamber Orchestra, "a clunky, confusing moniker". This view was held by other view held by others including, significantly, the orchestra's then executive chairman, Brian Benjamin, who said, "We undertook an exhaustive research project, looking at chamber orchestras worldwide, and discovered that more than 80 per cent name themselves after their place of residence." As a result, the decision was made by Benjamin and Hennessy for the name to be Melbourne Chamber Orchestra.

In 2022, the acronym "MCO" was trademarked and in 2024, the name "Melbourne Chamber Orchestra" was also trademarked.

=== The Other Melbourne Chamber Orchestra ===
In the early 1990s, Spiros Rantos (1945–2004) founded the Rantos Collegium which performed as 'Melbourne Chamber Orchestra' for a couple of years before wrapping up in 1996. Move Records recorded and distributed a CD during this time.

As discussed above, at the same time, Crellin's group was performing as APACO and would later change to MCO to align with the opening of the Melbourne Recital Centre. Other than the name, there is no connection between the two groups.

=== Audiences expansion and increase in activities ===
In its early days, MCO concentrated its seasons in Melbourne's Federation Square The Edge theatre which seated 450 people. As concert attendances quickly reached about 350 and were continuing to grow, the need was obvious for a larger auditorium.

With the new Melbourne Recital Centre due to be opened in February 2009, the orchestra planned to make that its main performance venue. At the time, commentator Robin Usher wrote in The Age, "There were doubts that the Melbourne Chamber Orchestra would survive its first year because it was felt the challenges of adapting to the Melbourne Recital Centre's 1000-seat Elisabeth Murdoch Hall would prove too rigorous. But the orchestra has thrived; attendances have more than doubled, with subscriptions up 60 per cent, and the best is yet to come. It has just announced two programs to be conducted by England's Sir Neville Marriner, 85, founder of the Academy of St-Martin-in-the-Fields, in November."

According to an annual report, by 2016, seven years after its move to the Recital Centre, audience support had grown to the extent that MCO decided to increase its annual season there from 11 to 13 concerts.

As for all arts organisations, from when the first known case of COVID-19 in Australia was reported on 25 January 2020 until the pandemic was declared in September 2022 by the Australian government to be over, public movement was restricted and audience attendances at arts events dwindled. MCO was badly affected and only six of the 53 seasonal performances originally planned for 2020 took place. As the report for that year says,

"The orchestra pivoted to digital small-format chamber music performances for the majority of the year. In total the orchestra still presented 36 performances and events, not including its Facebook-based Moments Musicaux project. These performances included 11 digital streaming performances on Melbourne Digital Concert Hall. In December, MCO was able to present an 11-performance live-audience celebration of Beethoven's 250th anniversary across eastern Victoria and Daylesford, with a string quintet."

Little changed for MCO during the two years following the pandemic. But a more positive picture emerged in the 2023 summary which showed that between it and the preceding year there had been a 51% increase in attendances at all events, and a 39% increase in paid attendances at the main Melbourne orchestral concerts.

MCO is now listed as one of the Melbourne Recital Centre's "Key Representing Partners", which makes the centre MCO's Melbourne venue for its annual orchestral seasons. Recitals of music for smaller chamber ensembles are presented at other city venues including The Edge in Federation Square.

MCO also tours regional and rural centres in Victoria providing programs from their Melbourne season. The 2017 report cited earlier noted that in that year there had been "22 regional touring performances to communities from Mornington to Yackandandah, adding that the orchestra was "one of Australia's most active tourers of classical music beyond urban centres, adding significantly to the diversity of music that audiences are able to access."

In September each year, MCO runs a chamber music festival called A Feast of Music at Daylesford and other nearby towns. Another annual engagement is the Chamber Music Dining at Narkoojee, a winery in Glengarry, Victoria.

2025 was the first year in which MCO presented performances outside of Victoria. The first, involving the entire orchestra along with musicians from the Victorian College of the Arts Secondary School, took place at the Snow Concert Hall in Canberra, Australian Capital Territory on 30 April. The second will be on 21 September at UKARIA Cultural Centre, Mount Barker, South Australia when Sophie Rowell will lead a quartet of MCO's string players and Australian pianist Andrea Lam

MCO's concerts continue to be accessible online through the Australian Digital Concert Hall subscription network and are broadcast and streamed online by Melbourne's music station 3MBS and Australia's national music network ABC Classic.

=== Repertoire ===
MCO's repertoire ranges from early music to contemporary works.

Over the years, MCO has commissioned many new works from Australian composers:

Year	Composer	Work title
1992	Julian Yu	Mini rhapsody for string orchestra.
2001	Philip Czaplowski	Concerto for clarinet & strings
2008	Christopher Willcock	Divertimento: Nolan's backyard: for string orchestra.
2009	Ian Munro	Divertimento: Melodies of an afternoon.
2013	Gordon Kerry	Music for double chamber orchestra (multiple orchestras).
2015	Paul Stanhope	Nephesh: for string octet or nonet
2015	Nicholas Buc	St. Mark's Scherzo.
2017	Keith Crellin, OAM	In Memoriam "Jan Sedivka".
2020	Matthew Laing	Pantomime
2022	Linda Kouvaras	Piano Quartet: for piano, violin, viola and cello.
2023	Caerwen Martin,	Sinfonia No 1 Embracing Duarte.
2023	Ade Vincent	To Be Human: for solo tenor, electric guitar and string orchestra.
2024	Katy Abbott	Glacial Thunder: for string orchestra.
2024	Nigel Westlake,	Trumpet Concerto (World premiere of the version for chamber orchestra based on the original 2022 version for trumpet and full orchestra written in memory of Australian trumpeter Paul Goodchild.
2025	Richard Mills	Violin Concerto Sinfonia Sacra. Four Portraits of the Blessed Virgin.
2025	Matthew Laing	This Waking Moment: string orchestra.
2025	Melody Eötvös	Unnamed work for harpsichord and string orchestra.
2025	Aaron Wyatt	Under The Canopy
2026	Joe Chindamo	Unnamed work. World premiere. MCO program scheduled for 26 February & 2 March 2026.
2026	Alice Humphries	Cello Concerto. Commissioned for Blair Harris, MCO's Principal Cellist.

It has also given the world premiere performances of works not specifically commissioned:

Year of performance	Composer	Work title
1997	Philip Czaplowski	Concerto for oboe and strings
1998	Philip Czaplowski	Threnody: for string orchestra
2010	Deborah Cheetham Fraillon,	Pecan Summer
2018	Richard Mills	Concerto for two violins and strings

=== Recordings ===
In 2008, as Australia Pro Arte Chamber Orchestra, Move Records published, Pictures at an Exhibition, featuring former (and founding) Artistic Director, Jeffrey Crellin.

In 2023, MCO released its self-produced CD titled, Poems & Romances, featuring Markiyan Melnychenko and then Artistic Director, William Hennessy. It received 3.5 stars from Limelight magazine.
