= Albert H. Maggs =

Australian bookmaker and philanthropist

- Born: 1916; Brunswick, Victoria, Australia
- Died: 8 June 1994 (aged 78); Toorak, Victoria, Australia
- Education: University High School, Melbourne; University of Melbourne
- Occupations: bookmaker, philanthropist, youth tennis player
- Known for: lifelong supporter of medical research
- Notable work: founded the Albert H. Maggs Composition Award

Albert Hartley Maggs (1916 – 8 June 1994) was an Australian bookmaker and philanthropist. He founded the Albert H. Maggs Composition Award of the University of Melbourne in 1966, and he was posthumously honoured with the creation of the Albert Maggs Scholarship for Postgraduate Medical Research by the St Vincent's Institute of Medical Research.

Maggs was born in Brunswick, Victoria, a suburb of Melbourne. He was one of five children of a shopkeeper. In his youth he was a fine tennis player. He qualified for the Wimbledon Championships, and he won the All Ireland Men's Championship.

At University High School, Melbourne he studied actuarial science, which skills he later used in his bookmaking business. He served in the military in World War II.

Maggs was a pianist who studied at the University of Melbourne Conservatorium, and a patron of the musical and theatrical arts. In 1966 he contributed an initial $10,000 to found the Albert H. Maggs Composition Award, an annual prize awarded by the University of Melbourne for a commissioned work. He later made more cash donations to support the award. Its recipients have included such names as Larry Sitsky, Colin Brumby, Richard Mills and Brenton Broadstock.

He was also a lifelong supporter of medical research, and made many donations to St Vincent's Institute. After his death in 1966, the Institute created an "Albert Maggs Scholarship for Postgraduate Medical Research".

Maggs died unmarried, aged 78, in Toorak, Victoria, on 8 June 1994.
