= Katy Abbott =

Australian composer

Katy Abbott (born 1971) is an Australian composer. Abbott writes music for orchestra, chamber ensemble and voice. Her work reflects her interests in contemporary Australian cultures and often explores notions of home, place, humour and connection.

== Biography ==
Abbott's compositions have been broadcast and performed in the UK, Europe, Asia and the US and featured in Australian and International music festivals including the International Alliance for Women in Music (IAWM) conference in Beijing the International Rostrum of Composers in Wroclaw, Poland, and the Melbourne, Perth and Canberra International Festivals.

Abbott studied with Stuart Greenbaum, Brenton Broadstock and Linda Kouvaras at University of Melbourne, where she completed her PhD in 2007.

Several of Abbott's compositions have appeared on the syllabus of Australian Music Examinations Board and ANZCA. Her compositions are published by Reed Music, Promethean Editions (NZ), the Australian Music Centre and Morton Music.

Abbott has released five solo albums; Sunburnt Aftertones: The Chamber Music of Katy Abbott (Move Records), The Domestic Sublime: The Vocal Music of Katy Abbott (ABC Classics), Famous (ABC Classics), Punch: The Brass Music of Katy Abbott (ABC Classics) and The Peasant Prince (ABC Classics with Tasmanian Symphony Orchestra (TSO) and Li Cunxin).

Abbott is currently based in Melbourne and holds the post of senior lecturer in music (composition) at Melbourne Conservatorium of Music, University of Melbourne.

== Selected works ==
=== Orchestral ===
- 2000 Carmen Vitae: Song of Life, commissioned by Presbyterian Ladies' College for their 125th anniversary
- 2009 The Peasant Prince for narrator and orchestra, commissioned Adelaide Symphony Orchestra and Symphony Australia
- 2012 Life Is But A Dream for orchestra, commissioned Ku-ring-gai Philharmonic Orchestra
- 2014 Introduced Species for orchestra, commissioned by Melbourne Symphony Orchestra together with Albert H. Maggs Award
- 2020 Fast Ride In A Suave Machine (versions for orchestra - arr. Stanke and Wind Symphony - arr. Nicholas Williams

=== Chamber ===
- 2006 No Ordinary Traveller, song cycle for mezzo-soprano and mixed trio, text by Jacki Holland, commissioned by Halcyon and Arts Victoria
- 2013 Midnight Songs for flugel horn, trombone and acoustic guitar, commissioned by Ensemble Three
- 2015 Re-echo, for vibraphone and cello
- 2017 Hidden Thoughts 1: Do I Matter?, for The Song Company and Syzygy Ensemble (12 musicians). The text for this work comes from the answers of over two hundred women to a confidential survey about their private thoughts.
- 2017 Earth Lullaby, for Shakuhatchi and String Quartet
- 2017 Undercurrent II, for trumpet in B♭, trombone, electric guitar and loop pedals
- 2020 Hidden Thoughts 2: Return to Sender, for female voice, narrator and string quartet – finalist Art Music Awards: Work of the Year: Chamber Music. This work sets to music the words from letters of support and encouragement written by Australians to asylum seekers on Nauru and Manus Islands.

=== Solo voice and instrumental ===
- 2006 It Is Just The Heart, for soprano and string quartet, commissioned by Australia Council
- 2007 Egyptian Register, for mezzo-soprano and piano, text by Ern Malley
- 2010 MultiSonics, for solo bassoon
- 2011 The Domestic Sublime for soprano and piano, commissioned by Sydney Conservatorium of Music/Ars Musica Australis, text by Chris Wallace-Crabbe, winner of the 2013 ‘Gold Medal for Art-Song’ (Boston Metro Opera) and finalist in 2013 APRA-AMCOS Art Music Awards (vocal category)
- 2013 Follow Me Through The Shadow trio for soprano, mezzo-soprano and cello. Text by Jen Storer. Composed for Halcyon Ensemble
- 2017 Taking Chances, for solo hi-hat and a version for percussion quartet

== Awards ==
- 2011 Albert H. Maggs Composition Award
- 2012 International Alliance for Women in Music Sylvia Glickman Memorial Award
- 2013 Boston Metro Opera 'Gold Medal for Art Song' for The Domestic Sublime (2011)
- 2018 Australia Council for the Arts New Music Fellow
- 2019 Paul Lowin Song Cycle Prize
