= Stuart Greenbaum =

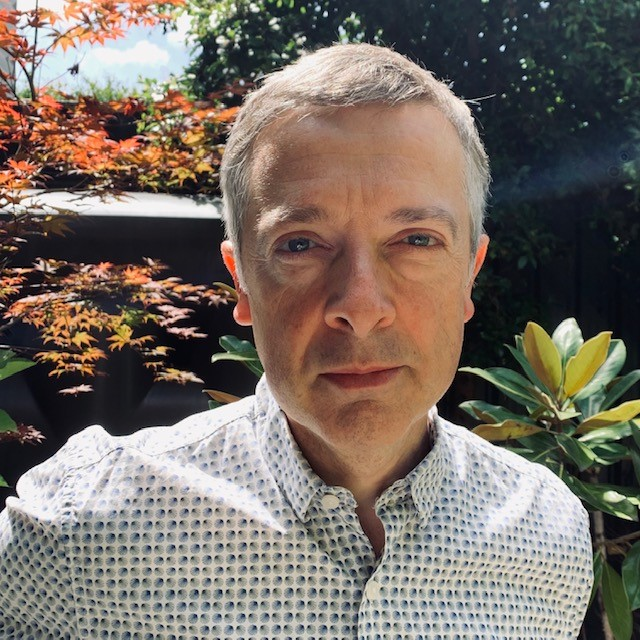
- Greenbaum, 2022

Background information
- Born: December 25, 1966 (age 58)
- Genres: Classical
- Occupations: composer, educator
- Website: www.stuartgreenbaum.com

Stuart Greenbaum (born 1966) is an Australian composer and Professor of music composition at the University of Melbourne. He served as Head of Composition from 2007 to 2023 at the Melbourne Conservatorium of Music.

Greenbaum has had his work performed all the major Australian orchestras, including both the Sydney Symphony Orchestra and the Melbourne Symphony Orchestra.

== Life and career ==
Stuart Greenbaum grew up in Melbourne, his mother a trained classical pianist who taught music at Deakin University. His original influences when young were pop, rock and blues, before later becoming interested in jazz. Greenbaum went on to study composition with Brenton Broadstock and Barry Conyngham at the University of Melbourne. Greenbaum plays the piano, as well as the oboe and the electric guitar.

He collaborated with the Melbourne poet Ross Baglin to create over 20 works, including 2 operas performed in Melbourne and London, an hour-long choral symphony, Brought to Light, premiered by Cantori New York in 2022, and several major choral works.

The early 1990s saw Greenbaum producing a number of pieces for stage, including a time as the resident composer at the Playbox Theatre in Melbourne. In 1993, as a young composer, he was commissioned to write Aaron Copland: In Memoriam, the first of a series of ten works commissioned by the Australian Broadcasting Corporation by young Australian composers. One of his first major works to be commissioned was The Foundling, commissioned by Cantori New York in 1997, and From the Beginning commissioned for the sesquicentenary of the Royal Melbourne Philharmonic in 2003.

Greenbaum's work Nelson, a 3–act opera with libretto by Ross Baglin, was presented in London in 2005 and premiered in full at the 2007 Castlemaine State Festival. He was a featured composer at the 2006 Aurora Festival. In 2007 he was commissioned by the artistic director of the Southern Cross Soloists to compose a work, Mondrian Interiors, featuring Marshall McGuire.

His work 90 Minutes Circling the Earth was named Orchestral Work of the Year at the 2008 Classical Music Awards. While it had been written in 1997, it was not recorded on CD till 10 years later, at which point it was brought to the attention of the judges. In 2009 he was Australia's representative for the Trans-Tasman Composer Exchange, working in Auckland with NZTrio on a new piano trio, The Year Without a Summer. This work toured nationally for Chamber Music New Zealand, in Sydney for the ISCM World New Music Days (2010) and internationally at the City of London Festival (2011). In May 2024, Iranian-born Melbourne pianist, Amir Farid, gave the US premiere of Greenbaum’s half hour piano sonata Ice Man (1993) to a sell-out audience at Carnegie Hall.

In 2024 Stuart Greenbaum signed a global publishing contract with Wise Music G. Schirmer Australia.

Greenbaum lives in Melbourne, Australia with his wife, Marianne Rothschild, a violinist.They have two children, Aksel and Hanna.

== Awards ==
- Orchestral Work of the Year 2008 (at the APRA Music Awards of 2008)
- Dorian Le Galliene Composition Award
- The Heinz Harant Prize
- Albert H. Maggs Composition Award
- ABC Classic Australia, 2008 Work of the Year (Chamber Concerto)

== Discography ==
- Music for Theatre (Playbox, 1992)
- Mercurial (Reed Music, 2005)
- 800 Million Heartbeats (ABC Classics, 2013)
- Mondrian Interiors (ABC Classics, 2015)
- Satellite Mapping (Move Records, 2016)
- Return Journey (ABC Classics, 2018)
- The Thin Blue Line (ABC Classics, 2018)
- The Final Hour (Lyrebird Productions, 2019)
- Electric Confession (Salisbury Records, 2021)
- A Trillion Miles of Darkness (ABC Classics, 2022)
- Abandoned Places (Artaria, 2025)
- Life in Light Years (Salisbury Records, 2025)

== Selected major works ==
- Symphony No.6 – Pulse of the Earth, 2024
- Piano Sonata No.3 – Life in Light Years, 2023
- String Quartet No.8 – Once More around the Sun, 2023
- Sonata for Flute, Viola and Harp – The Way Through, 2022
- Symphony No.5 – Brought to Light, 2022
- Piano Sonata No.2 – Journey into Darkness, 2021
- Sonata for Harp – The Bamboo Forest, 2020
- Sonata for Tuba and Piano – Underland, 2019
- Sonata for Horn and Piano – Hiroshima, 2019
- Sonata for Bassoon and Piano – Deep Time, 2019
- Sonata for Organ – Transport Abandoned, 2019
- Sonata for Percussion and Piano – Parallel Universe, 2019
- Sonata for Violin and Viola – From Far Above, 2018
- Far Beyond the Evening Sky – Symphony for Strings, 2018
- Sonata for Cor Anglais and Piano – Abandoned Places, 2018
- Tide Moon Earth Sun – concerto for Harp and Strings, 2018
- Sonata for Cello and Piano – Another Earth, 2018
- Translations, for recorder, erhu and string quartet, 2017
- Symphony No.3 – Supernova, 2017
- Sonata for Viola and Piano – Leaving Earth, 2017
- String Quartet No.7 – Recognition, 2016
- Sonata for Double Bass and Piano – Continental Drift, 2016
- Sonata for Clarinet and Piano – A Trillion Miles of Darkness, 2016
- String Quartet No.6 – Lonely Planet, 2015
- Sonata for Trumpet and Piano, 2015
- Sonata for Trombone and Piano, 2015
- Sonata for Oboe and Piano, 2015
- Sonata for Flute and Piano, 2015
- The Gradual Slowing of the Earth – concerto for organ and symphonic winds, 2014
- The Final Hour, for studio orchestra, narrator and electronics, 2013
- Sonata for Guitar, 2013
- Natural Satellite, for guitar duo, 2013
- Sonata for Piano, 4-hands, 2013
- Four Finalities, for soprano cor anglais and harp, 2012
- Dance Music for Concert Halls, for clarinet, violin, cello and piano, 2012
- Chamber Concerto No.2, 2011
- Symphony No.2 – Double Planet, 2010
- The Parrot Factory, an opera in 1 act, 2010
- All Those Ways of Leaving, for sextet, 2009
- The Year Without a Summer, for piano trio, 2009
- Falling By Degrees, for violin and piano, 2009
- Chamber Concerto, 2008
- Easter Island, for septet, 2008
- Mondrian Interiors, for solo harp and mixed quintet, 2007
- Nelson, an opera in 3 acts, 2005
- The Last Signal, for solo piano and chamber orchestra, 2005
- From the Beginning, for large choir, organ and orchestra, 2003
- Sonata for Alto Saxophone and Piano, 2002
- Sonata for Violin and Piano, 2000
- Symphony No.1 – Four Essay on the Passing of Time, 1998
- The Foundling, for choir, vibraphone and string quartet, 1997
- Ice Man, for solo piano, 1993
- Letters to the Front, for soprano and orchestra, 1989
