= Christian Heim =

Australian composer and psychiatrist (born 1960)

Christian Heim (born 1960) is an Australian psychiatrist, composer and public lecturer.

== Early life and education ==
Heim was born in Sydney. He studied under Peter Sculthorpe and finished a PhD in music under Anne Boyd at the University of Sydney. Further conducting and composition studies took him to Vienna, Paris and New York. Many of his works – mainly for orchestra, percussion and vocal ensembles – are of a spiritual or meditative nature and include Prayer Dances, Journey, and Transformation.

Heim gained his Bachelor of Medicine (honours) from the University of Newcastle in 2001 and was granted the right to practice psychiatry on 15 February 2008. He received a Churchill Fellowship to research the therapeutic effects of music in clinical settings.

== Career ==
As researchers, Dr Christian Heim and Dr Caroline Heim published the results of the largest study into long-term couples every undertaken in their book "Resilient Relationships: techniques for surviving hyper-individualism, social isolation and a mental health crisis" Together they research, publish, and speak in the areas of relationship resilience and as contributors to relationship longevity.

In psychiatry, Heim currently works as a Clinical Director in the Tasmania Mental Health Services. Previously he worked in private practice, and subspecialized in psychotherapy, personal trauma, and couple therapy where mental illness was a prominent factor. He teaches medical undergraduates and lectures to trainee psychiatrists. He researches on the arts/health interface and is an Associate Senior Lecturer at the University of Queensland.

In music, Heim held academic lecturing posts in music at the University of Wollongong and the University of Newcastle and lectured (casual) at the Manhattan School of Music. His musical Starlight unofficially opened the Hope Theatre, Wollongong. His findings on the effects of baroque music on dementia patients were published in Australasian Journal of Ageing in early 2004. They were described on the Australian Broadcasting Corporation's Radio National program, The National Interest in July 2004. A grant from the Bernard Judd Foundation enabled further publications in this area. Move Records released a CD of his work Prayer Dances featuring the Sydney Chamber Choir and Sprung Percussion.

He composed the music for and directed theatre productions for Crossbow Productions. These include Maxwell Anderson’s Mary of Scotland (Illawarra Performing Arts Centre, Wollongong 2004), Shakespeare’s Measure for Measure (the Myers Theatre, Kensington 2005), Anderson’s Anne of the Thousand Days (Brisbane Powerhouse 2006), William Gibson’s The Miracle Worker (Brisbane Powerhouse 2009), William Nicholson’s Shadowlands (Brisbane Powerhouse 2010), and Sartre’s No Exit (Darling Harbour Convention Centre, Sydney 2011) among others.

These productions provided the basis for academic publications on topics such as cultural issues and theatre, catering for people with disabilities, and the role of consciousness in Meisner-based acting.

Mardi Lumsden of JourneyOnline felt his 2010 direction of Shadowlands, a play written by William Nicholson, "is an innovative adaptation ... with the introduction of live music, sculpture and mine." Caitlin Graham of Australian Stage felt that due to "some clumsy and fussy direction" it "falls short" whilst "The music and the sculpture are lovely and create a nice atmosphere."

Heim delivers public lectures on topics combining psychiatry and music. These include: "Baroque & the Brain Wave: can music help in dementia care?" to the Royal Society of New South Wales (the society's Anne Wood described that "What he has done is to take this music from the late 17th century through to the mid 18th century and explore its therapeutic use in dementia patients with the aim of producing more calming brainwaves);" "An Afternoon with Frederic Chopin and George Sand" where he played piano in a portrayal of Chopin with Caroline Heim as Sand; and “Beethoven’s Immortal Beloved” where he explored the psyche of the composer who never married.

He writes books aimed at improving relationships and preventing mental health problems.

== Bibliography ==
- Journey (1983)
- Transformation (1993)
- Prayer Dances (2000) Move Records
- Music Therapy in Hospital Settings (2001)
- The Lazy Way to Overcome Procrastination (2015) Vivid publishing
- Your Relationship Is Your Greatest Asset (2017) Vivid publishing
- Listen (how to) (2017) Vivid publishing
