= Christian music in Australia =

Christian Music in Australia has been played since the first European settlers arrived in the late 18th century, and forms part of the cultural life of religion in Australia and worldwide Christian Music. Australians have contributed to a variety of genres of Christian music including the liturgical music, classical music, hymns, Christian rock, country gospel, and Christmas music, as well as cross-over contemporary music sung by popular artists such as Johnny O'Keefe, Paul Kelly (folk rock), Nick Cave and Slim Dusty. Notable contemporary Christian music milestones in Australia include Sister Janet Mead's rock version of "The Lord's Prayer", which was the first Australian record to sell over a million copies in the United States of America; Jimmy Little's Royal Telephone, which made him the first Aboriginal to attain a No. 1 hit on the Australian charts; and Guy Sebastian's Receive the Power, which welcomed the Pope to World Youth Day 2008.

== Liturgical music ==
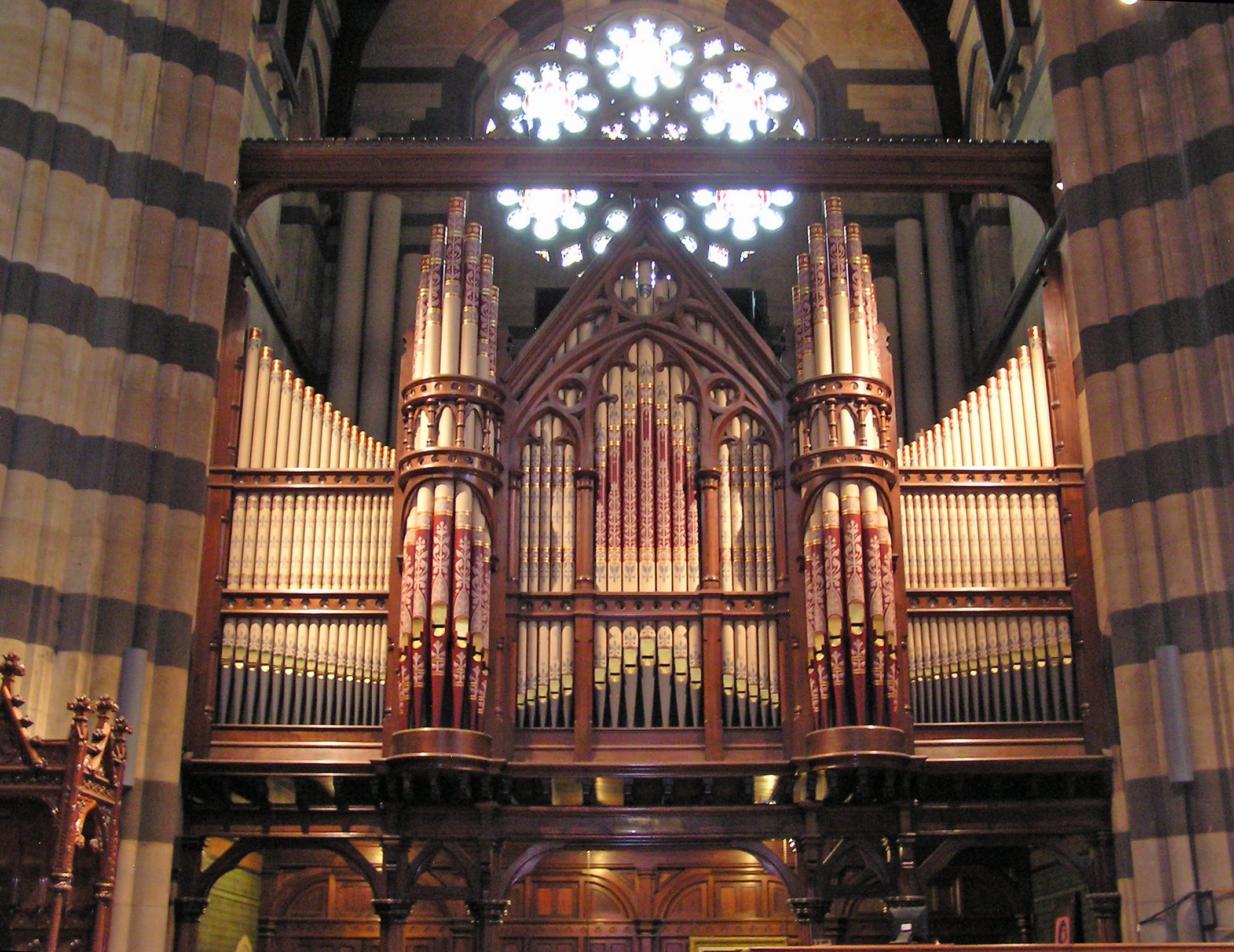
St Pauls Cathedral organ, Melbourne.

Christian liturgical music arrived in Australia with the First Fleet of British settlers in 1788. Liturgical music originating from religious ceremonies both ancient and modern is today practised within a number of Christian traditions in Australia. Historically, Christianity has been by far the predominant religion in Australia, and it remains the majority religion with 52% of the population identifying as Christian in the 2016 census, thus Christian music has been an important component of cultural life in Australia.

Post-War immigration has increased the diversity of Christian musical traditions in Australia, through the growth of denominations like the Greek Orthodox Archdiocese of Australia, though today, the Catholic Church in Australia is the largest denomination (with almost a quarter of the population), followed by the Anglican Church in Australia (13.3%). Historically, the Anglican component was higher, thus Anglican music and Catholic music along with that of smaller Protestant denominations like the Uniting Church in Australia has played an important and enduring role in the development of Australian liturgical music traditions.

Anglican music

Anglican music was initially the pre-dominant Christian musical tradition in Australia, reflecting its privileged position in the early British colonies. Early Australian composers included clerical Anglicans like George Torrance, Alfred Wheeler and Arthur Massey, Anglican schoolmasters like Henry John King and Anglican laymen like Frederick Augustus Packer. Today, Anglican music ranges widely across genres, from Melbourne's St Paul's Cathedral Choir who sing choral evensong most weeknights; to more Contemporary styles.

Catholic music

St Mary's Cathedral Choir, Sydney, is the oldest musical institution in Australia, from origins in 1817. Catholic choirmaster and conductor John Albert Delany (1852–1907)) was an early notable of Australian Christian music composition, and produced two Masses, as well as writing music for the inauguration of the Australian Commonwealth in 1901. The reforms of Vatican II removed much Latin music from Catholic ritual in Australia, and folk hymns entered the Catholic Mass in the 1960s. Today, the Latin Mass is a rarity in Australia. Sister Janet Mead's rock version of "The Lord's Prayer" was the first Australian record to sell over a million copies in the United States of America.

Other early Roman Catholic composers include clerical figures Bishop Rosendo Salvado, Fr. Stephen Moreno and laymen such as Hugo Alpen, Raimund Pechotsch and Herbert Cosgrove.

New South Wales Supreme Court Judge George Palmer was commissioned to compose the setting of the Mass for Sydney's World Youth Day 2008 Papal Mass. The Mass, Benedictus Qui Venit, for large choir, soloists and orchestra, was performed in the presence of Pope Benedict XVI and an audience of 350,000 with singing led by soprano Amelia Farrugia and tenor Andrew Goodwin.

"Receive the Power", a song written by Guy Sebastian and Gary Pinto, was chosen as the official anthem for the XXIII World Youth Day (WYD08) held in Sydney in 2008.

Pentecostalism

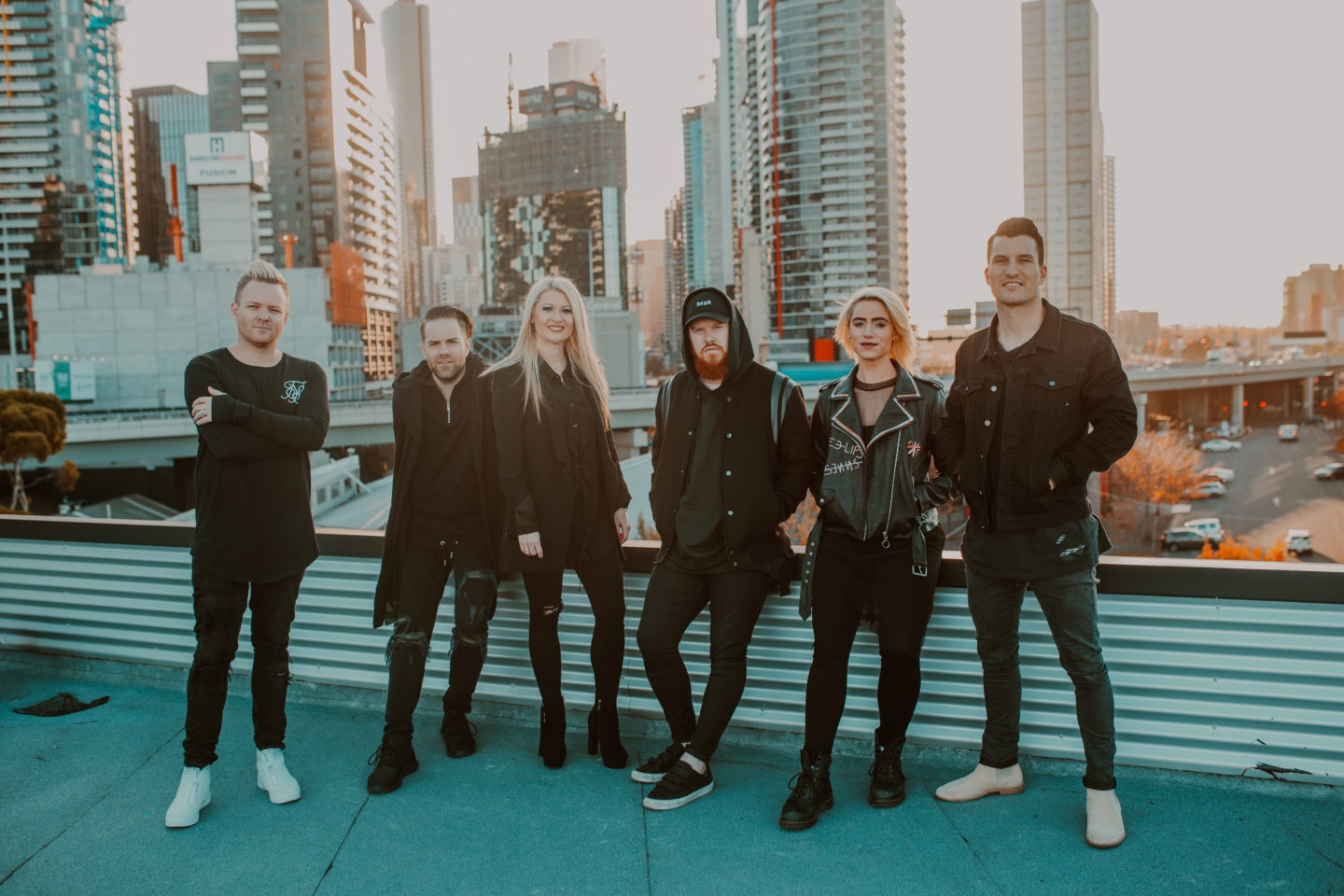
The Planetshakers band.

The growing Pentecostal branches of Christianity in Australia contribute strongly to the contemporary worship music genre. From the 1960s, Pentecostal groups in Australia increasingly adopted an informal style and used music to evangelise, which assisted with growing their following particularly in outer suburbs of Brisbane, Sydney and Melbourne. Today, the singing and music is one of the hallmarks of Australian Pentecostalism.

Hillsong Church is known for its worship music, with groups including Hillsong Worship, Hillsong United and Hillsong Young & Free.

Planetshakers Church is known for its worship music, with groups including Planetshakers and Planetboom. The Planetshakers have developed a large following in Christian music both within Australia and internationally, with a pop-rock musical style. Pastor Nicole Yow sees music as central to youth culture, and therefore one of the main ways her church connects with the young.

Uniting Church

Australian composers from uniting church congregations include Edwin Fowles of Queensland, Ernest Edwin Mitchell and William Robert Knox of South Australia

== Christmas music ==
Christmas customs have changed over time. Carol light candle services were considered quaint as gas light and electricity became widely available. Carol singers were initially community or church a cappella, accompanied by volunteers. Non-profit organizations organized groups for charitable purposes Tunes of migrant origin were replaced with Christmas Carols by Australian composers like Alfred Wheeler, Stephen Moreno, George Torrance, Christian Helleman, Joseph Summers, Joe Slater, Jessie Penfold, Ernesto Spagnoletti, Alfred Plumpton, Cesare Cutolo, August Juncker, George Savin De Chaneet, John Howson, William Robert Knox, Ernest Edwin Mitchell, Albert Delaney and Henry John King. Cultural cringe and technological developments (Gramophone, Radio, Talkies) rather eclipsed domestic endeavour.

Annually, Australians gather in large numbers for traditional open-air Christmas music Carols by Candlelight concerts in December, such as the Carols by Candlelight of Melbourne and Adelaide, and Sydney's Carols in the Domain. Australian Christmas carols like the Three Drovers or Christmas Day by John Wheeler and William G. James place the Christmas story in an Australian context of warm, dry Christmas winds and red dust. As the festival of Christmas falls during the Australian summer, Australians gather in large numbers for traditional open-air evening carol services and concerts in December, such as Carols by Candlelight in Melbourne and Carols in the Domain in Sydney.

== Country gospel ==
Australian country music's most successful artist Slim Dusty recorded a number of country gospel songs, with which he liked to finish his live shows. In 1971, he released the Gospel album Glory Bound Train, featuring the eponymous hit Glory Bound Train, and other songs of a Christian theme. Glory Bound Train was in turn the song selected to conclude the tribute concert held at Tamworth after his death. The "Concert for Slim" was recorded live on January 20, 2004, at the Tamworth Regional Entertainment Centre, and an all star cast of Australian musicians sung out the show with Slim's Glory Bound Train. The Australian Aboriginal singer-songwriter Jimmy Little was also a successful exponent of the genre.

== Aboriginal and Torres Strait Islander Music ==
The Christian music of the Christian missions of indigenous Australia forms an important part of the cultural history of Aboriginal and Torres Strait Islanders since White settlement. According to the Mission Songs Project, Mission Songs include church hymns, as well as the composed songs about daily life: "It was often missionaries who introduced Western instruments to Aboriginal people, although Western music could be heard in many places such as the wireless and jukeboxes, and church was one of the only places where Aboriginal people were encouraged to sing. Many Aboriginal people took advantage of this by learning to play music and adapting it to their own purposes." For example, the songs written by Tom Foster whilst a resident of La Perouse.

The Ntaria Choir at Hermannsburg, Northern Territory, has a unique musical language which mixes the traditional vocals of the Ntaria Aboriginal women with Lutheran chorales (tunes that were the basis of much of Bach's music). Baba Waiyar, a popular traditional Torres Strait Islander hymn shows the influence of gospel music mixed with traditionally strong Torres Strait Islander vocals and country music.

The Australian Aboriginal singer-songwriter Jimmy Little found commercial success in the genre of gospel music. His song "Royal Telephone" (1963) was the first No.1 hit by an Aboriginal artist.

== Contemporary music crossover ==
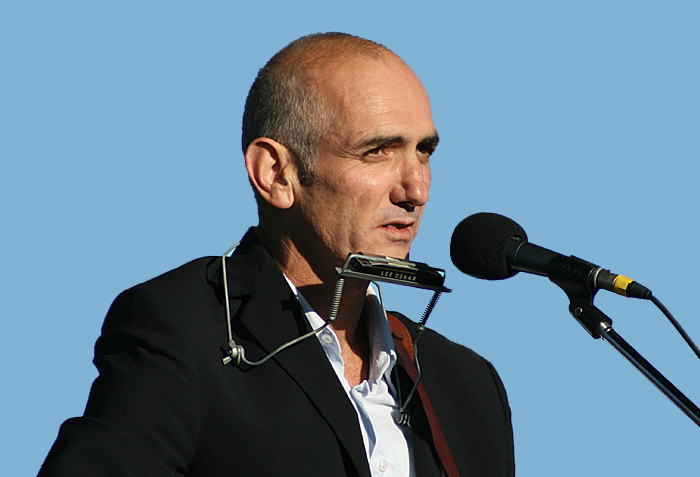
Paul Kelly

Pop, rock and other contemporary Australian artists from Johnny O'Keefe to Nick Cave and Paul Kelly have recorded Christian spirituals.

- Paul Kelly's Meet Me in the Middle of the Air is based on Psalm 23.
- Catholic nun Sister Janet Mead achieved significant mainstream chart success.
- Michelle Tumes and The Newsboys are well-known Australian Christian music exports.

== See also ==
- Catholic Church in Australia
- Anglican Church in Australia
- Christianity in Australia
- Australian classical music
