= Richard Gill (conductor) =

Australian conductor (1941–2018)

Richard Gill AO
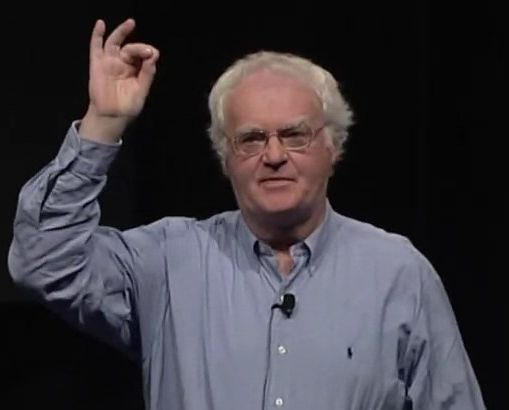
- At TEDx Sydney, 2011
- Born: 4 November 1941; Sydney, Australia
- Died: 28 October 2018 (aged 76); Sydney, Australia
- Occupations: Conductor, educator

Signature
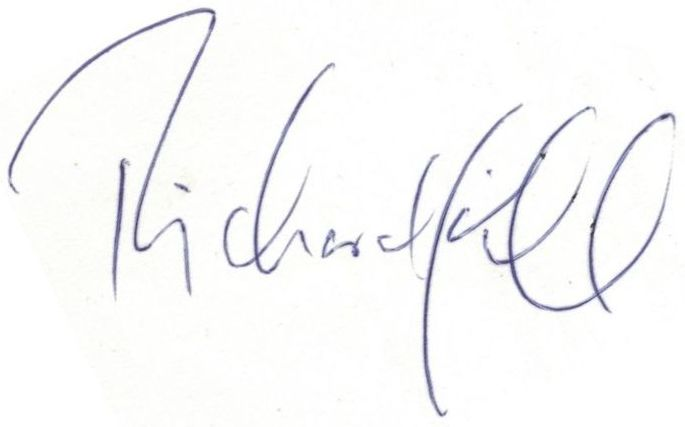

Richard James Gill AO (4 November 1941 – 28 October 2018) was an Australian conductor of choral, orchestral and operatic works. He was particularly known as a music educator and for his advocacy for music education of children.

== Life and career ==
Gill was born and raised in the Sydney suburb of Eastwood where he attended Marist College Eastwood. Prior to becoming a professional conductor, he was a music teacher at Marsden High School, West Ryde, in Sydney. One of his students was Kim Williams who later became a lifelong friend.

In 1969, he was the founding conductor of the Strathfield Symphony Orchestra in Sydney. He continued as conductor in 1973–74 and returned in 1979 to conduct the orchestra's 10th anniversary concert. In 1971 he studied at the Orff Institute of the Mozarteum in Salzburg. He was later invited to teach at the summer schools in Salzburg; on one occasion he was one of the pianists in the version of Carmina Burana for two pianos and percussion, conducted by Carl Orff himself. Gill was on staff at the Sydney Conservatorium of Music from 1975 to 1982. He was conductor with the Sydney Youth Orchestra Association from 1977 to 1982, conducting the orchestra's tour of Singapore and Hong Kong in 1981. In 1982, he was invited as a principal presenter to the annual conference of the American Orff Schulwerk Association (AOSA); this led to further workshops and classes throughout the United States. Other posts include dean of the Western Australian Academy of Performing Arts WAAPA (1985–1990) and Director of Chorus at the Opera Australia (1990–1996).

In August 2005, Gill founded and was the inaugural artistic director of Victorian Opera.

In 2013, along with Rachael Beesley and Nicole van Bruggen, he established the Australian Romantic & Classical Orchestra (formerly "orchestra seventeen88"). Gill was the artistic director and principal conductor of the orchestra. In 2022, the orchestra released its debut album, Perspective & Celebration, featuring Gill conducting Mendelssohn's concert overture The Hebrides.

In 2014, he was appointed to succeed Paul Stanhope as musical director of the Sydney Chamber Choir.

In February 2017, Gill conducted the inaugural gathering of the Sydney Flash Mob Choir at the City Recital Hall in Angel Place, Sydney, bringing together singers and would-be singers from all walks of life for a monthly 40-minute singalong.

Gill died on 28 October 2018, aged 76, from colorectal and peritoneal cancer. The day before he died, more than 70 musicians (including a police band) gathered outside Gill's home in Stanmore, in Sydney's inner west, and played for Gill and his family (who were inside the house), including "The Dam Busters March" (reportedly "Gill's favourite song from his favourite movie").

== Music educator ==
Gill was an advocate for the importance of music, arts and physical education for all children, believing that singing should be the basis of all music education. Prior to his death, plans were well-advanced to establish a music-based primary school in New South Wales in 2020, to be known as the Muswellbrook Richard Gill National Music Academy. The Richard Gill School, with Gill's former student Kim Williams as chairman, opened (on premises formerly used by the Muswellbrook Council at its chambers) in 2021 with 13 students from Prep and Year 1. The school curriculum is based around music, physical activity and the STEM subjects (science, technology, engineering and mathematics), making it a STEAM-based school (science, technology, engineering, arts and mathematics). Students are drawn from the general community and music is seen as a part of the core curriculum for all students (something Gill advocated during much of his life), not just those students exhibiting a gift in the area of music. The school song "O Come Now My Friends" has words by Gill's son Anthony, and music by Australian composer Nigel Westlake.

== Repertoire ==
Richard Gill: The Value of Music Education, TEDxSydney, 2011

Gill's operatic repertoire included performances with Opera Queensland, Opera Australia, the Sydney, Adelaide and Melbourne Festivals, and Windmill Performing Arts. He conducted the world premieres of Alan John's The Eighth Wonder (1995) and Moya Henderson's Lindy (2002) with Opera Australia, and Jonathan Mills' The Ghost Wife at the Melbourne International Arts Festival in 1999 (and again at London's Barbican Centre in 2002), and The Eternity Man at the Sydney Festival in 2004. For the Victorian Opera he conducted the new Australian works The Love of the Nightingale by Richard Mills (2007), Alan John's Through the Looking Glass (2008) and Andrew Ford's Rembrandt's Wife (2009). His work in the concert hall included concerts with all the major Australian orchestras.

In his Discovery and Ears Wide Open series of concerts, he took selected works from the traditional and the contemporary classical music repertoire and analysed the works in a humorous and entertaining manner, trying to find what made the works "tick" and to, as he said, listen to the music "with new ears".

== Composition ==
He composed the music for Brisbane Girls Grammar School school song, "Nil sine labore" [Nothing without work].

== Awards ==
Awards included an Order of Australia Medal in 1994, a Centenary Medal in 2001, the Bernard Heinze Award for services to music in Australia, and an honorary doctorate from the Edith Cowan University of Western Australia for his service to Australian music and musicians. In 2001 he received the Australian Music Centre's award for 'Most Distinguished Contribution to the Presentation of Australian Composition by an Individual'. In December 2005, he was awarded the Don Banks Music Award 2006 by the Australia Council for the Arts. In 2016 he was promoted within the Order of Australia to Officer level.

Gill was awarded a MOST (Music & Opera Singers Trust) Achievement Award in July 2018 "in recognition of his exceptional contribution to the Arts in Australia as both a conductor and as a music educator". Two weeks later he was awarded the Arts Leadership Award at the 2018 Creative Partnerships Awards, held at the Art Gallery of New South Wales.

The Australian Music Centre and APRA AMCOS renamed their Award for Distinguished Services to Australian Music in 2019 to Richard Gill Award for Distinguished Services to Australian Music. Gill had won that award in 2014.

=== APRA Awards ===
The APRA Awards are held in Australia and New Zealand by the Australasian Performing Right Association to recognise songwriting skills, sales and airplay performance by its members annually.

Year	Nominee / work	Award	Result	Ref.
2014	Richard Gill	Distinguished Services to Australian Music	awards	

=== Bernard Heinze Memorial Award ===
The Sir Bernard Heinze Memorial Award is given to a person who has made an outstanding contribution to music in Australia.

Year	Nominee / work	Award	Result	Ref.
1998	Richard Gill	Sir Bernard Heinze Memorial Award	awarded	

=== Don Banks Music Award ===
The Don Banks Music Award was established in 1984 to publicly honour a senior artist of high distinction who has made an outstanding and sustained contribution to music in Australia. It was founded by the Australia Council in honour of Don Banks, Australian composer, performer and the first chair of its music board.

Year	Nominee / work	Award	Result
2006	Richard Gill	Don Banks Music Award	awarded

== Appearances ==
The artist Jasper Knight, whom Gill taught music at school and whose grandmother worked with Gill in early childhood education, was a finalist at the Archibald Prize of 2005 with a portrait of Gill. In 2006 he appeared in the four-part ABC documentary/reality series Operatunity Oz, which sought Australian singers with opera potential, and in the 2007 follow-up episode Operatunity Oz – Twelve Months On.

He was a frequent guest on ABC-TV's popular-music panel show Spicks and Specks. The 2018 reunion special of the show was dedicated in his memory.

In January 2009, Gill worked with the New Zealand Symphony Orchestra's National Youth Orchestra (NYO) in their National Music Camp in Napier, New Zealand, on the occasion of NYO's 50th anniversary celebrations.
