= Albert H. Maggs Composition Award =

The Albert H. Maggs Composition Award is a commission-based Australian classical composition award given in order to "encourage and assist composers who might otherwise abandon their efforts for want of means".

The award was founded in 1966 by Albert H. Maggs, a Melbourne-based professional bookmaker, amateur pianist and patron of the arts and medicine. He initially provided $10,000, and made later contributions to keep the award viable.

The only qualification is that applicants must have resided in Australia for at least two years before the closing date for applications, in March. It is administered by the University of Melbourne and is awarded annually in August.

The winner agrees to submit their work within 18 months of the award being made. The current value of the award is $7,000 with another $3,000 as a performance subsidy.

== List of winners ==
The following composers have been awarded the Albert H. Maggs Composition Award:

- 1967 Nigel Butterley
- 1968 Larry Sitsky
- 1969 Colin Brumby
- 1970 Keith Humble
- 1971 Raymond Hanson
- 1972 George Dreyfus
- 1973 Graham Hair
- 1974 Donald Hollier
- 1975 Ann Carr-Boyd
- 1975 George Tibbits
- 1976 Eric Gross
- 1977 Tristram Cary
- 1978 Barry Conyngham
- 1979 Richard Hames
- 1980 David Worrall
- 1981 Larry Sitsky
- 1982 Richard Mills
- 1983 Božidar Kos
- 1984 Brenton Broadstock
- 1985 Andrew Schultz
- 1986 Warren Burt
- 1987 Chu Wang-Hua
- 1988 Julian Yu
- 1989 no award given
- 1990 Mary Finsterer
- 1991 Stephen Cronin
- 1992 Mark Pollard
- 1993 Lesleigh Thompson
- 1994 Gerard Brophy
- 1995 Thomas Reiner
- 1996 Wilfred Lehmann
- 1997 David Joseph
- 1998 Christopher Willcock
- 1999 Wilfred Lehmann
- 2000 Gerard Brophy
- 2001 Stuart Greenbaum
- 2002 Lawrence Whiffin
- 2005 John Peterson
- 2006 Johanna Selleck
- 2007 Mark Isaacs
- 2008 Barry Conyngham
- 2009 Kate Neal
- 2010 Paul Stanhope
- 2011 Katy Abbott
- 2012 Andrew Ford
- 2013 Brenton Broadstock
- 2014 Tim Dargaville
- 2015 Julian Yu
- 2016 Peter Knight
- 2017 Lachlan Skipworth
- 2018 Natalie Williams
- 2019 Wally Gunn
- 2020 Nigel Westlake
- 2021 Anne Cawrse
- 2022 Connor D'Netto
- 2023 Aristea Mellos

== Sources ==
- "Albert H. Maggs Composition Awards". Louise Hanson-Dyer Music Library. University of Melbourne. Archived from the original on 1 June 2019.
- Australian Music Centre
- University of Melbourne Statute: R7.127 The Albert H. Maggs Composition Award
