= Gerald English =

English tenor (1925–2019)

- Gerald English, in the 1950s

Background information
- Born: 6 November 1925; Kingston upon Hull, East Riding of Yorkshire, England
- Died: 6 February 2019 (aged 93) United Kingdom
- Genres: Early and Classical music
- Occupation: Tenor

Gerald English (6 November 1925 – 6 February 2019) was an English tenor. He performed operatic and concert repertoire, was a recording artist, and was a sometime academic.

He gave many premiere performances of works by composers such as Igor Stravinsky, Hans Werner Henze, Benjamin Britten, Michael Tippett, and Andrew Ford, often under their own direction. He also sang under the batons of Ernest Ansermet, Ralph Vaughan Williams, Sir John Barbirolli and Sir Thomas Beecham. He sang opera for the Glyndebourne Festival, The Royal Opera at Covent Garden, La Scala, and in Sydney, Adelaide, Manchester, Edinburgh, Florence, Rome, Paris, Buenos Aires, Vienna, Barcelona, and Sadler's Wells. He also performed in concerts in America, as well as in cities like Brussels, Rome, Cologne, Stockholm, Lisbon, Amsterdam or Rio de Janeiro.

== Personal life ==
Gerald Alfred English was born in 1925 to Alfred English who as a chemist was employed as a manager at Reckitt & Colman. His mother was Ethel née Gambrell, who was a tailor, and he had two sisters, Margot and Yvonne. His father wanted him to be a mathematician. His family moved to France when he was two years old, and he was based in northern France for 14 years, although from the age of 13 he was attending King's School, Rochester in England. During World War II he spent four years in military intelligence, where he spent much of his time listening to secret German communications from a base on the bleak Yorkshire moors. One of his colleagues during that time was the composer Peter Wishart. He became a student at the Royal College of Music. He was taught by Jennifer Ryan.

English had three significant relationships, mostly in Australia, and ten children. His first marriage in 1954 was to Jane or Jennifer Ryan who gave him four children and played viol in some of his Baroque music recordings. They were divorced. His second marriage in 1974 was to Linda Jacoby. They had one son, and were divorced. He had a long-term relationship and five children with Helen O'Brien. They lived in Victoria, then he left her in 2012 and returned to the United Kingdom. In 2019 Tim English, one of his sons from his first marriage, was running the junior department of the Royal Birmingham Conservatoire.

== Career ==
In the 1950s, English was a concert singer. For example, in 1950 he took part in a recital at Holy Trinity Church, Kensington Gore, London, singing polyphonic motets. Although English worked internationally, he was based in the United Kingdom, and then in Australia.

=== United Kingdom ===
At age 25, English became a member of the St. Paul's Cathedral Choir, and shortly thereafter in 1948, one of the original members of the Deller Consort, where his continental upbringing proved of value in singing idiomatic French. In 1952 he sang Boyce's The Heavens Declare and Purcell's Bell Anthem, besides Thomas Tallis's Mode III Hymn Tune, in St Sepulchre's, London, with the Deller Consort. During this time, he also began to build a reputation as a recitalist, gaining particular authority as an interpreter of the songs of Gabriel Fauré. He sang many opera performances in a wide-ranging repertory that covered several centuries. He was as comfortable and authentic in Monteverdi as he was in the music of his own time. He had many years of experience in music of the Elizabethan period. English's debut in opera took place with the English Opera Group in 1956 when he sang the evil Peter Quint in Benjamin Britten's The Turn of the Screw under the composer's direction. He also sang the role in Milan. From 1961 to 1977, he sang 26 times in the BBC Proms, his debut being Britten's Les Illuminations under the baton of Sir Malcolm Sargent. He sang at many British venues, including Sadler's Wells. He performed alongside Forbes Robinson and April Cantelo in Der Barbier von Bagdad, which was broadcast by the BBC in 1965.

English received good notices for his interpretations in works by contemporary composers such as Tippett, Richard Rodney Bennett (who had requested him for the title role in The Ledge), Stravinsky, Luigi Dallapiccola, and Henze. He appeared at the Glyndebourne Festival 1962–1964 (where he sang in Monteverdi's L'incoronazione di Poppea), and in 1963 at the Grand Opéra Paris (as Andres in Alban Berg's Wozzeck).

From 1960 to 1977, English was a professor at his alma mater, the Royal College of Music, and tutor in singing at New College, Oxford. During 1968–1969 he was with others in Rio de Janeiro, Toronto, Brussels, Stockholm, Rome, Cologne, Amsterdam and Lisbon in a successful concert program, which included works from both the Baroque era, in particular of Johann Sebastian Bach, and from the modern era.

=== Australia ===
In 1973, English was artist-in-residence for universities in Western Australia and New South Wales. Between 1977 and 1989 he became Founding Director of the Opera Studio of the Victorian College of the Arts in Melbourne. There he supervised postgraduate vocal studies in baroque music and movement.

English sang Leoš Janáček's song cycle The Diary of One Who Disappeared as part of the 1992 Melbourne International Festival, and in the same year premiered Andrew Ford's Harbour with the Australian Chamber Orchestra. Other highlights include the role of the story teller in Peter Tahourdin's Heloise and Abelard for the West Australian Opera, Maurice Ravel's Chansons madécasses with the Australia Ensemble, performances of Peggy Glanville-Hicks' Letters from Morocco with the Hunter Orchestra and the Tasmanian Symphony Orchestra, and the soloist in scenes and interludes from György Ligeti's Le Grand Macabre with the Melbourne Symphony Orchestra. On 13 May 1989 English was awarded an Honorary Doctorate in Music from the University of Sydney. Professor JM Ward, A.O, Principal and Vice-Chancellor of the University presented the degree.

In 1993 he was awarded one of the prestigious Australian Creative Artists' Fellowships, and he held the position between 1994 and 1999. In 1995, he persuaded 13 Australian composers to each write a piece, to be showcased at the Gerald English Birthday Concert in honour of his 70th birthday. The composers who contributed included; Tony Bremner, Roger Smalley, Richard David Hames, Gordon Kerry, Nigel Butterley, Wilfrid Mellers, Stephen Cronin, Andrew Ford, Michael Finnissy, George Tibbits, Peter Sculthorpe, Ross Edwards and Martin Wesley-Smith.

Premiere performances include Benjamin Britten's Nocturne with Sir John Barbirolli conducting the Hallé Orchestra, Henze's We Come to the River directed by the composer at Covent Garden, Dallapicolla's Ulisse conducted by the composer in Rome, and Luciano Berio's Opera for the Florence Festival. He has also premiered 12 pieces by the Australian composer and broadcaster Andrew Ford. The one-man music-theatre piece Night and Dreams: the death of Sigmund Freud was commissioned by the 2000 Adelaide Festival, when he was 74 years old. English's last vocal performances before retirement were in 2004.

== Recordings ==
English made many recordings, including the complete works of Monteverdi. He recorded cantatas by Telemann, Handel and Bach, with the group Il Pastor Fido. Other composers he recorded include Andrew Ford, Peggy Glanville-Hicks, Vaughan Williams (The Pilgrim's Progress), Henry Purcell (Te Deum), John Dowland, and Robert Schumann.

== Conductors Gerald English performed with as soloist ==
Claudio Abbado, Karel Ančerl, Ernest Ansermet, David Atherton, Sir John Barbirolli, Daniel Barenboim, Luciano Berio, Nadia Boulanger, Pierre Boulez, Sir Adrian Boult, Benjamin Britten, Oleg Caetani, Basil Cameron, Stuart Challender, Meredith Davies, Sir Colin Davis, Luigi Dallapiccola, Christoph von Dohnányi, Antal Doráti, Sir Edward Downes, Sir Mark Elder, Lawrence Foster, Sir Alexander Gibson, Berthold Goldschmidt, Harold Gray, Sir Charles Groves, Bernard Haitink, Vernon Handley, Hans Werner Henze, John Hopkins, Hiroyuki Iwaki, Otto Klemperer, Raymond Leppard, Sir Anthony Lewis, Witold Lutosławski, Peter Maag, Lorin Maazel, Sir Charles Mackerras, Bruno Maderna, Igor Markevitch, Jean Martinon, David Measham, Krzysztof Penderecki, David Porcelijn, Georges Prêtre, André Previn, Sir Simon Rattle, Sir Malcolm Sargent, Eric Schmid, Markus Stenz, Igor Stravinsky, Sir Michael Tippett, Edo de Waart,

== Orchestras Gerald English sang solo with ==
=== Australia and New Zealand ===
- Adelaide Symphony Orchestra,
- Brisbane Symphony Orchestra,
- Melbourne Symphony Orchestra,
- Sydney Symphony Orchestra,
- Tasmanian Symphony Orchestra,
- West Australian Symphony Orchestra,
- Christchurch Symphony Orchestra,
- New Zealand Radio Orchestra,

=== Asia ===
- Singapore Symphony Orchestra,
- Hong Kong Symphony
- Israel Philharmonic,
- Tel Aviv Chamber Orchestra

=== Europe ===
Austria

Austrian Radio Orchestra,

Czechoslovakia

Czech National Orchestra, Prague Symphony Orchestra, Prague Chamber Orchestra,

Germany

Philharmonisches Staatsorcherester Hamburg, Radio Symphony Orchestra Saarbrucken, WDR Radio Orchestra Cologne, Collegium Auriem,

France

Orchestre de Paris, Orchestre national Bordeaux Aquitaine, French National Radio Orchestra,

Belgium

Brussels Radio Symphony Orchestra Liege, Namu,

Netherlands

Concertgebouw, Amsterdam, Rotterdam Philharmonic,

Spain Orqesta Ciudad de Barcelona, Orchestra Nacional Spain, Madrid Symphony Orchestra, Alhambra Concerts, Barcelona Concerts, San Sebastian Concerts.

Portugal

Lisbon National Orchestra, Oporto Opera Orchestra, Gulbenian Centre Orchestra,

Italy

Turin Opera House Orchestra, La Scala Orchestra, Orchestra Sinfonica de Milano, Orchestra de Milano RAI RAI Roma, Orchestra Santa Cecilia Roma, Naples, Florence Opera Orchestra,

UK

London Symphony Orchestra, London Philharmonic Orchestra, London Sinfonietta, English Chamber Orchestra, Bournemouth Sinfoietta, City of Birmingham Symphony Orchestra, BBC Symphony Orchestra, The Philaharmonia, Royal Philharmonic, Mozart Players, St. Martin in the Fields, Scottish Chamber Orchestra, Halle Orchestra, Royal Liverpool Phiaharmonic,

Other Hungarian State Orchestra

Dubrovnik Orchestra

=== North America ===
Montreal Symphony Orchestra, Cleveland Symphony Orchestra, Toronto Symphony Orchestra, Dallas Symphony Orchestra, Vancouver Symphony Orchestra, Ottawa Symphony Orchestra.

=== South America ===
Orquesta Filharmonica de Buenos Aires, Argentina, Brazil Rio de Janeiro Radio Symphony Orchestra.
