= Sydney Chamber Choir =

Australian chamber choir

Sydney Chamber Choir is a choir from Sydney formed as the Sydney University Chamber Choir in 1975.

== History ==
The Sydney Chamber choir was founded in 1975 with Nicholas Routley as its director. It became involved in Renaissance music, especially the works of Josquin des Prez. It also began a program of commissioning new music from Australian composers. The choir's performances are broadcast on ABC Classic. The choir has also recorded soundtracks for a number of feature films. It appeared in the inaugural Aurora Festival of contemporary music in 2006. In February of that year, the choir joined with The Tallis Scholars to perform Tallis' 40-voice motet Spem in alium in City Recital Hall Angel Place.

In 2007 the Sydney Chamber Choir commissioned a new work from Australian composer Nigel Butterley. The work, Beni Avshalom was completed almost fifty years after Butterley's frequently performed choral work The True Samaritan. In 2009 the Sydney Chamber Choir took out 3rd prize in two mixed-voice categories (polyphony and folklore) in the 41st Tolosa International Choral Festival in Spain.

== Awards and nominations ==
=== AIR Awards ===
The Australian Independent Record Awards (commonly known informally as AIR Awards) is an annual awards night to recognise, promote and celebrate the success of Australia's Independent Music sector.

Year	Nominee / work	Award	Result
2018	Paul Stanhope: Lux Aeterna	Best Independent Classical Album	Nominated

=== ARIA Award for Best Classical Album ===
Year	Nominee / work	Award	Result
1987	The Victoria Requiem – Sydney University Chamber Choir	Best Classical Album	Nominated

=== APRA Classical Music Awards ===
The APRA Classical Music Awards are presented annually by Australasian Performing Right Association (APRA) and Australian Music Centre (AMC).

Year	Nominee / work	Award	Result
2006	Southern Star (excerpts) (Christopher Willcock, Michael Leunig) – Sydney Chamber Choir, Marshall McGuire	Vocal or Choral Work of the Year	Won

== Musical director ==
- Nicholas Routley (1975 - 1982)
- Neil McEwan (1982 - 1985)
- Nicholas Routley (1985 - 1990)
- Hans-Dieter Michatz (1990 - 1993)
- Nicholas Routley (1993 - 2006)
- Paul Stanhope (2006 - 2015)
- Richard Gill (2015 - 2018)
- Sam Allchurch (2019 - )
