= Don Banks Music Award =

- Awarded for: Outstanding contributions in Australian music
- Country: Australia
- Presented by: Creative Australia
- First award: 1984–present
- Website: https://creative.gov.au/advocacy-and-research/events/creative-australia-awards/

The Don Banks Music Award was established in 1984 to publicly honour a senior artist of high distinction who has made an outstanding and sustained contribution to music in Australia. It is awarded by Creative Australia (formerly the Australia Council) in honour of Don Banks, Australian composer, performer, and the first chairman of its music board.

Nominations for music artists, including performers and composers from all areas of music, are invited. The award is considered the nation's most valuable individual music prize. It is intended for artists 50 years and older and is granted only once in an artist's lifetime. Prize recipients receive $25,000 AU as a reward for their contributions to Australian music.

== Award recipients ==
- 1984 – Larry Sitsky AO, FAHA, composer, pianist
- 1985 – Nigel Butterley AM, composer, pianist
- 1986 – Felix Werder AM, composer
- 1987 – Martin Wesley-Smith AM, composer
- 1988 – Brian Howard, composer, conductor
- 1989 – Ross Edwards AM, composer
- 1990 – Colin Brumby, composer, conductor
- 1991 – Ros Bandt, sound artist
- 1992 – George Dreyfus AM, composer
- 1993 – Moya Henderson AM, composer
- 1994 – Roger Smalley AM, composer, pianist, conductor
- 1996 – Richard Mills AM, composer, conductor
- 1997 – Richard Meale AM MBE FAHA, composer, music educator
- 1998 – Bernie McGann, jazz saxophonist
- 1999 – Brenton Broadstock AM, composer
- 2000 – Bunna Lawrie, of the Aboriginal band Coloured Stone
- 2001 – Allan Browne OAM, jazz drummer
- 2003 – John Curro AM MBE, music educator
- 2004 – Jan Sedivka AM, violinist, teacher
- 2005 – Carl Vine AO, composer
- 2006 – Richard Gill AO, conductor
- 2007 – Peter Sculthorpe AO OBE FAHA, composer, music educator
- 2008 – Bob Sedergreen, jazz pianist
- 2009 – Tony Gould AM, jazz pianist
- 2010 – Warren Fahey AM, folklorist
- 2011 – Belinda Webster OAM, producer
- 2012 – Jon Rose, violinist
- 2014 – Mike Nock, composer, pianist
- 2015 – Archie Roach AM, musician
- 2016 – Brett Dean, composer
- 2017 – Lyn Williams AM, choir director
- 2018 – Liza Lim, composer
- 2019 – David Bridie, composer, singer/songwriter
- 2020 – Deborah Conway, singer-songwriter and guitarist
- 2021 – William Barton, composer and didgeridoo virtuoso
- 2022 – Judy Bailey, New Zealand jazz pianist and composer
- 2023 – Deborah Cheetham Fraillon, Australian soprano, actor, composer and playwright
- 2024 – Amanda Brown, composer
- 2025 – Raymond Ahn and Peter ("Blackie") Black of the Hard-Ons (joint winners)

Credits:
