= Pecan Summer =

- Opera by Deborah Cheetham Fraillon
- Librettist: Cheetham
- Language: English and Yorta Yorta
- Premiere: 8 October 2010; WestSide Performing Arts Centre, Mooroopna

Pecan Summer is an opera written and composed by the Indigenous Australian opera singer Deborah Cheetham Fraillon, who also sang in every season. It is the first opera written by an Indigenous Australian and involving an Indigenous cast, and was performed by Cheetham's Short Black Opera Company.

== Cast ==
Pecan Summer is the first opera written by an Indigenous Australian and involving an Indigenous cast.

Filmmaker Jub Clerc was cast as a soprano in 2010 and will be an associate director for the 10th anniversary production.

== Synopsis ==
The storyline was based on the February 1939 Cummeragunja walk-off, in which Cheetham's grandparents were involved. The timeline of the opera moves from the Dreamtime to July 2006, on the banks of the Yarra River near Federation Square in Melbourne; to 1939, on the banks of the Dhungala (Murray River) near the Cummeragunja Mission; to several months later in winter 1939; to Shepparton at an unspecified time; to Federation Square on 13 February 2008, the day of Kevin Rudd's apology.

== Background and composition ==
Pecan Summer was commissioned for the Olympic Arts Festival, which was held in association with the 2012 Summer Olympics in London.

The libretto was written by Cheetham in Yorta Yorta and English, during a short stay in Lucca, Italy. With his agreement, Cheetham used a recording of Prime Minister Kevin Rudd's February 2008 apology to Australia's Indigenous peoples for the Stolen Generations as part of the work.

It was orchestrated by Jessica Wells.

The Short Black Opera for Kids program was formed in 2009 in order to create a children's chorus to perform in Pecan Summer, which became known as the Dhungala Children's Choir and continues to operate.

== Performances ==
The opera had an unofficial preview performance in Melbourne in July 2010.

Its official world premiere took place at the WestSide Performing Arts Centre, Mooroopna, Victoria, on 8 October 2010, where it was presented by the Short Black Opera Company and the Melbourne Chamber Orchestra under David Kram.

The world premiere performance was broadcast by ABC Classic FM on 28 November 2010.

Short Black Opera has produced four seasons of Pecan Summer: Mooroopna 2010; Melbourne 2011; Perth 2012; Adelaide 2014; Sydney 2016. The 2016 season was performed in the Concert Hall of the Sydney Opera House and was recorded by National Indigenous Television and ABC Classic FM.

A 10th anniversary production is planned.
