= Colin Brumby =

Australian composer and conductor

Colin James Brumby
- Born: 18 June 1933; Melbourne, Australia
- Died: 3 January 2018 (aged 84); Brisbane, Australia
- Occupations: Composer, conductor

Colin James Brumby (18 June 1933 – 3 January 2018) was an Australian composer and conductor.

== Biography ==
Brumby was born in Melbourne and educated at the Glen Iris State School, Spring Road Central School, and Melbourne Boys' High School. He studied at the University of Melbourne Conservatorium of Music, from which he graduated in 1957 with a diploma in education. In 1953 he was a finalist in the Australian Youth Aria competition, eventually winning the Lieder Award. He was organist at St. Oswald's Glen Iris from 1950 to 1953. Before travelling to Europe in 1962 he taught in Queensland schools and was for a time the head of music at Kelvin Grove Teacher's College. He went to Spain to study advanced composition with Philipp Jarnach, and to London to study with Alexander Goehr. On his return to Australia, he joined the staff of the Music Department at the University of Queensland, and was based in Brisbane ever since. He became Associate Professor with the University of Queensland, from which he retired in 1998. Brumby was Musical Director of the Queensland Opera Company from 1968 to 1971. While there, he conducted the Australian premieres of works such as Joseph Haydn's L'infedeltà delusa and Georges Bizet's Le docteur Miracle. He also wrote a series of children's operettas, including The Wise Shoemaker (1968) Rita and Dita and the Pirate (1969), Rita and Dita in Toyland (1969) and The Prince Who Couldn't Laugh (1969). These operettas toured throughout Queensland by the Queensland Opera Company, and were performed in 400 schools, reaching an audience of 75,000.

In 1965 his work, Fibonacci Variations (1963) was selected for possible inclusion in the programmes of contemporary music, to be produced the International Society for Contemporary Music Festival. In 1971, he received his Doctorate of Music from the University of Melbourne. In 1972 he returned overseas to study composition with Franco Evangelisti in Rome. After his return to Australia, Musica Viva Australia commissioned Brumby to compose a work for the 1974 tour of the Academy of St Martin in the Fields. This was The Phoenix and the Turtle for string orchestra and harpsichord.

He won a number of awards. In 1969 he won the Albert H. Maggs Composition Award, composing the work A Ballade for St. Cecilia : Cantata for Chorus, Orchestra and Soloists. In 1981 Brumby was awarded an Advance Australia Award for services to music. He has also won the Don Banks Fellowship (1990) and the APRA award for most performed Australasian serious work.

Brumby's music includes operas; concerti for flute, oboe, clarinet, bassoon, horn, trumpet, piano, violin, viola, and guitar; two symphonies; orchestral suites and overtures; chamber works; sonatas for flute, clarinet and bassoon; incidental music for dramatic presentations; film and ballet scores; and songs.

His wife Jenny Dawson has contributed libretti for some of his operettas.

His personal papers and oral history are held at the State Library of Queensland.

Brumby died in Brisbane on 3 January 2018.

== Stage works ==
- The Wise Shoemaker (lib. Brumby), children's operetta (1968, Brisbane)
- Rita and Dita and the Pirate (lib. Brumby, after the brothers Grimm), children's operetta (1969, Brisbane)
- Rita and Dita in Toyland (lib. Brumby), children's operetta, 1 Act (1970, Rockhampton)
- The Two Suitors (lib. Brumby), children's operetta, 1 Act (1970, Rockhampton)
- The Seven Deadly Sins – a New Concept of Music Theatre (lib. Brumby, Thomas Shapcott, Meryn Moriarty), 2-act opera (1970, Brisbane)
- The Marriage Machine (lib. Brumby), 1-act opera (1972, Sydney); 1985 arranged for orchestra
- La Donna (lib. David Goddard), 1-act opera (1988, Sydney)
- Summer Carol (lib. Thomas Shapcott), 1-act opera (1991, Canberra)
- The Heretic (lib. Morris West after his play)
- The Bunyip, operetta
- The Haunted House of Highgate Hill, operetta
- The Spirit of Eureka, operetta

== Ballets ==
- Alice (commissioned by Queensland Ballet, 1989)

== Orchestral works ==
- The Phoenix and the Turtle (1974; string orchestra and harpsichord)
- Litanies of the Sun
- Fibonacci Variations (1963)
- Paean (1982; a showpiece for the Sydney Symphony Orchestra during the Australian Broadcasting Corporation's 50th Anniversary celebrations in 1982)
- South Bank Overture (1984; commissioned for the 1984 opening of the Concert Hall in the Queensland Cultural Centre)
- Borromeo Suite
- Scena for cor anglais and orchestra
- Mediterranean Suite, string orchestra
- Concertino, viola and string orchestra (1960)
- Viola Concerto Tre aspetti di Roma, viola and orchestra (1990)

== Choral works ==
- Victimae Paschali (commissioned by Pro Musica in Brisbane)
- Three Baroque Angels (commissioned for the 30th Intervarsity Choral Festival)
- Cantata Charlie Bubbles' Book of Hours (for an Australian UNESCO Seminar on Music Education)
- This is the Vine (for the 40th International Eucharistic Congress)
- Cantata The Ballad of Sydney Hospital (commemorating the Bicentenary of the Sydney Hospital)
- Aquinas: Two Eucharistic Texts [O salutaris hostia; Tantum ergo] for solo or unison choir and organ
- From All That Dwell (Isaac Watts) for two-part choir with keyboard
- The Fruitless Fig (text by Brumby) for SATB choir and organ
- Give Judgment for Me, O Lord (Psalm 26) for SATB choir and organ
- How Lovely Are Thy Dwellings Fair! (John Milton) for SATB choir and organ
- In Praise of the Virgin (13th century British text) for SATB choir a cappella
- Iustorum animæ (Scripture) SATB a cappella
- Nine Tenebræ Responsories, 3 vols., for 2-part choir and organ
- "Missa Sanctae Ceciliae" for SATB choir and organ (commissioned by the Choir of Saint John the Evangelist's Anglican Church, Dee Why)
- O My People (the Reproaches) for 2-part choir and organ
- Prisquam gallus cantet (Matthew 26:75) SATB a cappella
- Stabat mater dolorosa (Traditional sequence) for SATB choir and organ (or strings)
- Stabat mater speciosa (1965)
- Ten New Carols for Advent and Christmas
- Teach Me, O Lord (Psalm 119:33–40) for SATB choir and organ
- Three Sacred Rounds (4-part)
- Two Easter Anthems (text Brumby) for SATB choir and organ
- Unto Us A Boy Is Born (traditional text) for SATB choir and keyboard
- Carol Book (based on medieval carols and noels) for 2 part choir and keyboard (Walton, Frank Pooler ed.)
- Brumby Mass SATB and organ (Walton, Frank Pooler ed.)
- 100 chorales, hymns, responses, psalms, alleluias, rounds, and motets online at Cloud Hymnal
- Gloria in C for SATB and organ (Cloud Hymnal)
- Southern Cross Mass for SATB and organ (Cloud Hymnal)
- Mass for All Seasons for SATB and organ (Cloud Hymnal)
- Australian Mass for SATB and organ (Cloud Hymnal)
- * All Glory, Laud and Honour, choral prelude

== Chamber works ==
- The Seven Ages of Man, wind quintet
- String quartet (1968)
- Piano quartet
- Bassoon quintet Haydn Down Under
- Bassoon Concerto (1982) (dedicated to George Zukerman)
- 4 Exotic Pieces, flute and harp
- Suite for contrabass quartet
- 4 Aphorisms, clarinet and piano
- 4 Miniatures, flute and piano
- 4 simple duos, descant recorders
- Abendlied, viola and piano (2001)
- Berceuse, Chaconne, Nocturne, viola and piano
- Etude, solo viola
- Mediterranean Suite, viola quartet and double bass (1956)
- Passacaglia, viola ensemble (7 violas) and piano
- Sonatina, viola and piano (1982)

== Piano ==
- Harlequinade

== Organ ==
- 5 Chorale Preludes
- 7 Chorale Preludes
- Captain Logan's Fancy
- "Theme and Variations on Moreton Bay"
- Toccata

== Awards ==
=== Don Banks Music Award ===
The Don Banks Music Award was established in 1984 to publicly honour a senior artist of high distinction who has made an outstanding and sustained contribution to music in Australia. It was founded by the Australia Council in honour of Don Banks, Australian composer, performer and the first chair of its music board.

Year	Nominee / work	Award	Result
1990	Colin Brumby	Don Banks Music Award	Won

== Sources ==
- Australian Music Centre biography of Colin Brumby
- Operone
- Cantica Nova Publications
- Colin Brumby Oral History and Digital Story 1950–2014, State Library of Queensland
- Albert H. Maggs Composition Awards
- Australian Music Centre notice of death of Colin Brumby
- Cloud Hymnal
