= Move Records =

Australian independent record label

- Founded: December 24, 1968
- Founder: Martin Wright
- Status: Active
- Genre: Classical, jazz, world
- Country of origin: Australia
- Location: Melbourne, Victoria
- Official website: www.move.com.au

Move Records is an Australian independent record label founded in Melbourne in 1968 by Martin Wright. The label specialises in classical music, particularly recordings by Australian performers and composers, and has also released jazz, soundtrack and other specialist titles.

== History ==
Move Records grew out of Move Two Mix, an LP of modern church music produced by Wright at Bill Armstrong Studios in South Melbourne while he was working at Melbourne's Presbyterian Bookroom.

In its early years the label issued religious and folk material, licensed some overseas recordings, and gradually moved into location recording in Melbourne venues including St Patrick's Cathedral, Ormond College and the University of Melbourne Conservatorium. In 1973 Move released Reverberations, described in later accounts as the first LP of Australian organ music, with Douglas Lawrence performing works by Keith Humble, Felix Werder, Ron Nagorcka and Ian Bonighton.

During the 1970s the label broadened into early music and jazz, including releases by La Romanesca and Tony Gould. Nick Alexander left the company at the end of the 1970s, after which Wright remained the central figure in the label's operations.

The label was an early adopter of digital recording methods. Later summaries of its history note the use of Beta video tape, DAT, Sound Designer II and Pro Tools, as well as the transition from LP to compact disc after local CD manufacturing began in 1987. Wright said in 1993 that the shift to compact disc left Move with large stocks of unsold vinyl, much of which had to be given away.

Move built a dedicated studio at Eaglemont in the early 1990s for classical acoustic recording. Vaughan McAlley joined the label in the mid-1990s as a recording engineer and music editor.

In 2025 the Australian Music Centre described Move as "Australia's longest-running independent classical music label". Its 50th anniversary was marked by the release of Move 50, a compilation of 24 new works by Australian composers.

== Artists ==
Composers include Julian Yu, George Dreyfus, John Sangster, Eve Duncan, Percy Grainger, Mark Clement Pollard, Brenton Broadstock, Tony Gould, Peter Sculthorpe, Cezary Skubiszewski, David Joseph, Marshall-Hall, Nigel Westlake, Carl Vine, David Chisholm (composer), Larry Sitsky, Kanako Okamoto, Andrew Ford, Andrew Byrne, Thomas Reiner (composer), Christian Heim and others.

Classical artists include Michael Kieran Harvey, Douglas Lawrence, Elizabeth Anderson, John O'Donnell, Jocqueline Ogiel, La Romanesca, Robert Ampt, Gerald English, Genevieve Lacey, Peter Carroll-Held, Ian Holtham, Miwako Abe, Ronald Farren-Price, Ian King, Sonny Chua, re-sound, Amy Johansen, Norman Kaye, Collusion and others.

Jazz artists include Tony Gould, Bob Sedergreen, Keith Hounslow, John Sangster, Emma Gilmartin, Ted Vining, the Alan Lee/Jo Abbott Quartet, Debra Blaquiere, and others.

== Soundtracks ==
The label has also released soundtracks of Australian films; the best known is Japanese Story. Ambient and World Music artists include Dean Frenkel, Le Tuan Hung and Ros Bandt. The label has specialised in recording classical pipe organs, many of which have great historical interest. These have included the bamboo organ in Manila, the Sydney Opera House organ, Melbourne and Sydney Town Hall organs, and many smaller instruments from the German-settled Barossa Valley in South Australia, and gold-rush Ballarat area of Victoria.

== See also ==
- List of record labels
- Australian classical music
