= Linda Kouvaras =

Australian composer and musicologist

Linda Kouvaras (born 1960) is a Melbourne-based composer with a background in punk and new wave. Her compositions, which explore genre mixing, are focused on vocals and piano music, and are released on ABC Records and Move Records.

Kouvaras is also a musicologist at the Melbourne Conservatorium of Music of the University of Melbourne; her research interests include Australian music and gender and music. Her book, Loading the Silence: Australian Sound Art in the Post-Digital Age was published by Ashgate in 2013 and received the Rebecca Coyle Publication Prize of 2014. She is one of the editors of the academic journal Current Issues in Music.

== Discography ==
- Piano music (Move Records, 1990)
- The Team of Pianists (Move Records, 1990)
- Bright tracks (Move Records, 1998)
- Repose (Move Records, 1999)
- Kouvaras: PianoWorks (Move Records, 2000)
- Giants in the land (Move Records, 2002)
- Move 50 (Move Records, 2019)
- The Sky is Melting (Move Records, 2014)
