= Larry Sitsky =

Australian composer, pianist, and music educator

Emeritus Professor Larry Sitsky AO, FAHA
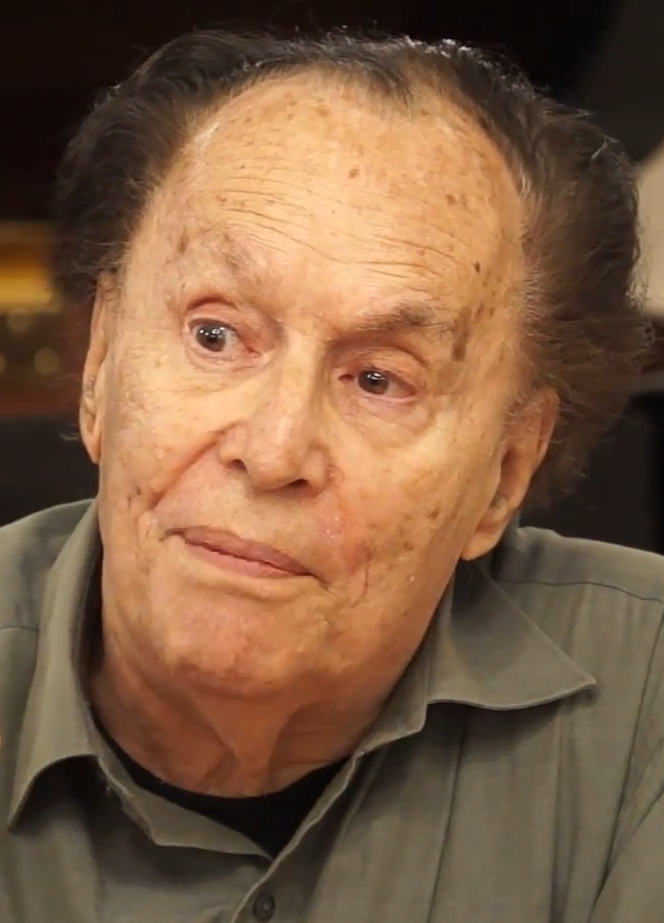
- Sitsky in 2019
- Born: Lazar Sitsky; 10 September 1934 (age 91); Tianjin, China
- Education: New South Wales Conservatorium of Music
- Occupations: Composer; pianist; music educator; scholar

Lazar "Larry" Sitsky AO, FAHA (born 10 September 1934) is an Australian composer, pianist, and music educator and scholar.

Sitsky was the first Australian to be invited to the USSR on a cultural exchange visit, organised by the Australian Department of Foreign Affairs in 1977. He has received many awards for his compositions: the Albert H. Maggs Composition Award in 1968, and again in 1981; the Alfred Hill Memorial Prize for his String Quartet in 1968; a China Fellowship in 1983; a Fulbright Award in 1988–89, and an Advance Australia Award for achievement in music (1989). He has also been awarded the inaugural prize from the Fellowship of Composers (1989), the first National Critics' Award, and the inaugural Australian Composers' Fellowship presented by the Music Board of the Australia Council, which gave him the opportunity to write a large number of compositions (including concerti for violin, guitar, and orchestra), to revise his book Busoni and the Piano, and to commence work as a pianist on the Anthology of Australian Piano Music.

== Life and career ==
Larry Sitsky was born in Tianjin (formerly Tientsin), China, of Russian-Jewish émigré parents. He demonstrated perfect pitch at an early age, by identifying notes or chords played in a different room. He studied piano from an early age, gave his first public concert at the age of nine, and started writing music soon thereafter. His family was forced to leave China during Mao's rule. They came to Australia in 1951 and settled in Sydney. He had sat for Cambridge University Overseas Matriculation before leaving China. His first studies at university were in engineering, at his parents' insistence. This was not successful and "he convinced his parents to allow him to pursue his passion, music". He obtained a scholarship to the New South Wales Conservatorium of Music, where he studied piano, briefly with Alexander Sverjensky but mainly with Winifred Burston (a student of Ferruccio Busoni and Egon Petri), and composition, graduating in 1955. In 1959, he won a scholarship to the San Francisco Conservatory, where he studied with Egon Petri for two years. Returning to Australia, he joined the staff of the Queensland Conservatorium of Music, after being accepted sight unseen based on a recommendation from Petri. His Australian studies and his subsequent studies in the United States, "combined with the Russian heritage from his early studies in China, [make] him a unique repository of piano techniques and tradition which is acknowledged internationally".

A grant from the Myer Foundation in 1965 enabled him to conduct research into the music of Ferruccio Busoni, on whom he has written extensively. In 1966 he was appointed Head of Keyboard Studies at the Canberra School of Music, was later Head of Musicology and was Head of Composition Studies. He is currently emeritus Professor of the Australian National University in Canberra.

Sitsky has always performed as well as composed, and as a student won performance awards. He believes that composers should perform, saying that "without this communion with a live audience, music-making all too easily becomes over-intellectualised, sterile and arid". As a performer, he champions twentieth-century repertoire.

In terms of composition, Sitsky has regularly changed his musical language to "express himself in ways that are not familiar and 'easy'".

Larry Sitsky attracted attention when he, among others, criticised the Keating government for giving successive artistic fellowships to the pianist Geoffrey Tozer. He explained that his criticism was not personal against Tozer, who was a friend of his, but that it was a matter of principle.

A biography of Sitsky was published in the US in 1997.

== In the media ==
The New Zealand composer and writer, William Green, compiled a brief biographical and musical overview of Sitsky in a radio program on Radio New Zealand Concert.

== Works ==
Sitsky has published the two-volume The Classical Reproducing Piano Roll and Music of the Repressed Russian Avant-Garde, 1900–1929, and has recorded a number of CDs of Australian piano music, including the complete sonatas of Roy Agnew.

He has had works commissioned by many leading Australian and international bodies, such as the ABC, Musica Viva Australia, the International Clarinet Society, the Sydney International Piano Competition, Flederman and the International Flute Convention. His collection of teaching pieces, Century, has been published by Currency Press, and he also has an open contract to publish anything he wishes with his New York publisher, Seesaw Music Corporation.

In August 2011, Sitsky announced plans to write a series of operas based on the stories of Enid Blyton. The works were premiered by the ANU School of Music.

== Personal life ==
He is married to the Czech-born Magda Sitsky.

== Selected works ==
=== Opera ===
- The Fall of the House of Usher, 1965, Libretto: Gwen Harwood. Premiered 19 August 1965, Theatre Royal, Hobart, conductor Rex Hobcroft
- Lenz, 1970, Libretto: Gwen Harwood. Recorded Australian Broadcasting Corporation (Adelaide) 1982, conductor Christopher Lyndon-Gee; Lenz, Gerald English, tenor.
- Fiery Tales, 1975, after Chaucer and Boccaccio.
- Voices in Limbo, 1977, Libretto: Gwen Harwood.
- The Golem, 1980, Libretto: Gwen Harwood. Premiered by The Australian Opera under Christopher Lyndon-Gee, conductor, in 1993. Commercial CD recording released 2005 by ABC Classics (Polygram), edited from 1993 live performances.
- De Profundis, 1982, Libretto: Gwen Harwood.
- Three scenes from Aboriginal life: 1. Campfire scene, 2. Mathina, 3. Legend of the Brolga, 1988

=== Ballet ===
- Sinfonia for Ten Players ("The Dark Refuge") (1964)

=== Orchestral ===
- Concerto for Orchestra (1984)
- Symphony in Four Movements (premiered by the Canberra Symphony Orchestra under Robert Bailey, 23 May 2001)

=== Concertante ===
- Piano Concerto (1991, rev, 1994)
- Cello Concerto (1993)
- Violin Concerto No. 4 (1998)
- Zohar: Sephardic Concerto for mandolin and orchestra (1998)
- Jewish folk song (1955)

=== Solo instrument ===
- Improvisation and Cadenza for solo viola (1964)
- Khavar for solo trombone (1984)
- "Sayat Nova" for solo Oboe (1984)

=== Vocal ===
- Incidental music to Faust for solo piano and three sopranos, 1996
- Seven Zen Songs for voice and viola (2005)

=== Unclassified ===
- Ten Sepphiroth of the Kabbala
- Mysterium Cosmographicum
- The Secret Gates of the House of Osiris

== Awards and honours ==
In 1997 the Australian National University awarded him its first Higher Doctorate in Fine Arts. In 1998, he was elected Fellow of the Australian Academy of the Humanities. He is currently a Distinguished Visiting Fellow, as well as emeritus Professor at the Australian National University.

In 2000 he was appointed a Member of the Order of Australia (AM) for service to music as a composer, musicologist, pianist and educator; and in the same year he received the Centenary Medal for service to Australian society through music. In 2017 Sitsky was appointed an Officer of the Order of Australia for distinguished service to the arts as a composer and concert pianist, to music education as a researcher and mentor, and through musical contributions to Australia's contemporary culture.

=== ARIA Music Awards ===
The ARIA Music Awards are a set of annual ceremonies presented by Australian Recording Industry Association (ARIA), which recognise excellence, innovation, and achievement across all genres of the music of Australia. They commenced in 1987.

| Year | Nominee / work | Award | Result | Ref. |
|---|---|---|---|---|
| 1989 | Contemporary Australian Piano | Best Independent Release | Nominated | |

=== Don Banks Music Award ===
The Don Banks Music Award was established in 1984 to publicly honour a senior artist of high distinction who has made an outstanding and sustained contribution to music in Australia. It was founded by the Australia Council in honour of Don Banks, Australian composer, performer and the first chair of its music board.

| Year | Nominee / work | Award | Result |
|---|---|---|---|
| 1984 | Larry Sitsky | Don Banks Music Award | awarded |
