= Nigel Butterley =

Australian musician (1935–2022)

Nigel Butterley AM
- Born: 13 May 1935
- Died: 19 February 2022 (aged 86)
- Education: Sydney Grammar School; Sydney Conservatorium of Music

Nigel Henry Cockburn Butterley AM (13 May 1935 – 19 February 2022) was an Australian composer and pianist.

== Life and career ==
Butterley was born in Sydney and learned to play the piano at the age of five. He attended Sydney Grammar School, but music was not taught at the school at that time, so he sought training from the Sydney Conservatorium of Music. He then travelled abroad and spent a year in Europe, where he studied with Priaulx Rainier in London.

After returning to Australia, Butterley composed his work Laudes in 1963. He won the Prix Italia award for his work In the Head the Fire in 1966. In 1967 he was the inaugural winner of the Albert H. Maggs Composition Award. He continued to compose throughout the following decades, composing works for the Sydney Proms concerts such as Interaction for Artist and Orchestra, music performed while artist John Peart painted and First Day Covers, a collaboration with Barry Humphries' character Dame Edna Everage. Butterley went on to win the Paul Lowin Orchestral Prize in 2001.

Butterley lectured at the Newcastle Conservatorium from 1973 to 1991, and later at the Sydney Conservatorium. He also broadcast programs on ABC Classic FM.

On 10 June 1991, Butterley was appointed a Member of the Order of Australia (AM) "in recognition of services to music".

Butterley died at a nursing home on 19 February 2022, aged 86.

== Compositions ==
Butterley's compositions were strongly influenced by poetry and are sometimes accompanied by recitation when performed. He composed a series of pieces inspired by the poetry of William Blake, and in later life was inspired by the work of Kathleen Raine.

His other compositions included There Came a Wind Like a Bugle, The White-throated Warbler (written for Carl Dolmetsch in 1966), Child in Nature, The Wind Stirs Gently, Frogs and Uttering Joyous Leaves.

In 2007 the Sydney Chamber Choir commissioned a new work, Beni Avshalom, which was completed almost 50 years after Butterley's frequently performed landmark choral work The True Samaritan.

== Awards and nominations ==
=== ARIA Music Awards ===
The ARIA Music Awards is an annual awards ceremony that recognises excellence, innovation, and achievement across all genres of Australian music. They commenced in 1987.

Year	Nominee / work	Award	Result	Ref.
1994	John Cage	Best Classical Album	Nominated	

=== Don Banks Music Award ===
The Don Banks Music Award was established in 1984 to publicly honour a senior artist of high distinction who has made an outstanding and sustained contribution to music in Australia. It was founded by the Australia Council in honour of Don Banks, Australian composer, performer and the first chair of its music board.

Year	Nominee / work	Award	Result
1985	Nigel Butterley	Don Banks Music Award	awarded
