= George Tibbits (composer) =

Australian composer and architect

George Tibbits

George Richard Tibbits (7 November 1933 – 6 July 2008) was an Australian composer and architect. Tibbits was born in Boulder, Western Australia, to a family of mining prospectors, and when his father returned wounded from the First World War, the family moved to Colac, Victoria, to take up dairying. He studied architecture at the University of Melbourne, and eventually taught urban studies and architectural history there and established the urban studies program. He initiated the first heritage conservation study, the Beechworth Historical Reconstruction Project. He was also prominent in opposing the former Housing Commission's slum reclamation project in inner Melbourne.

He was not formally trained in music and worked outside of the main channels of art music production in Australia. At age 16 he wrote his first major work, Otway Ranges Symphony. His early works show the influence of his interest in the music of Indonesia, as well as American modernists such as Milton Babbitt and John Cage. He would often jot down pieces of tunes while travelling on public transport. Late in the 1950s, he concentrated on works depicting what he referred to as the 'brutalist' aspects of urban civilization, but by the 1960s had returned to a more lyrical style. He became more interested in rock and pop music after a 1965 trip to England to work on urban planning. Later compositions incorporate elements of parody and collage. He set some poems by Vin Buckley to music for soprano and orchestra, as Golden Builders. 1976 was a setting of a 1906 newspaper article describing a massacre of Indigenous Australians in Gippsland. He wrote 45 works in total, and all but one were given performances by professional orchestras or chamber groups. They include 5 string quartets, an octet for wind called Battue, and other works.

In 1975 he won the Albert H. Maggs Composition Award.

Tibbits died in 2008, aged 74. Ten days before his death, he was awarded an Honorary Doctorate in Architecture by the University of Melbourne.
