= Barry Conyngham =

Australian composer and academic (born 1944)

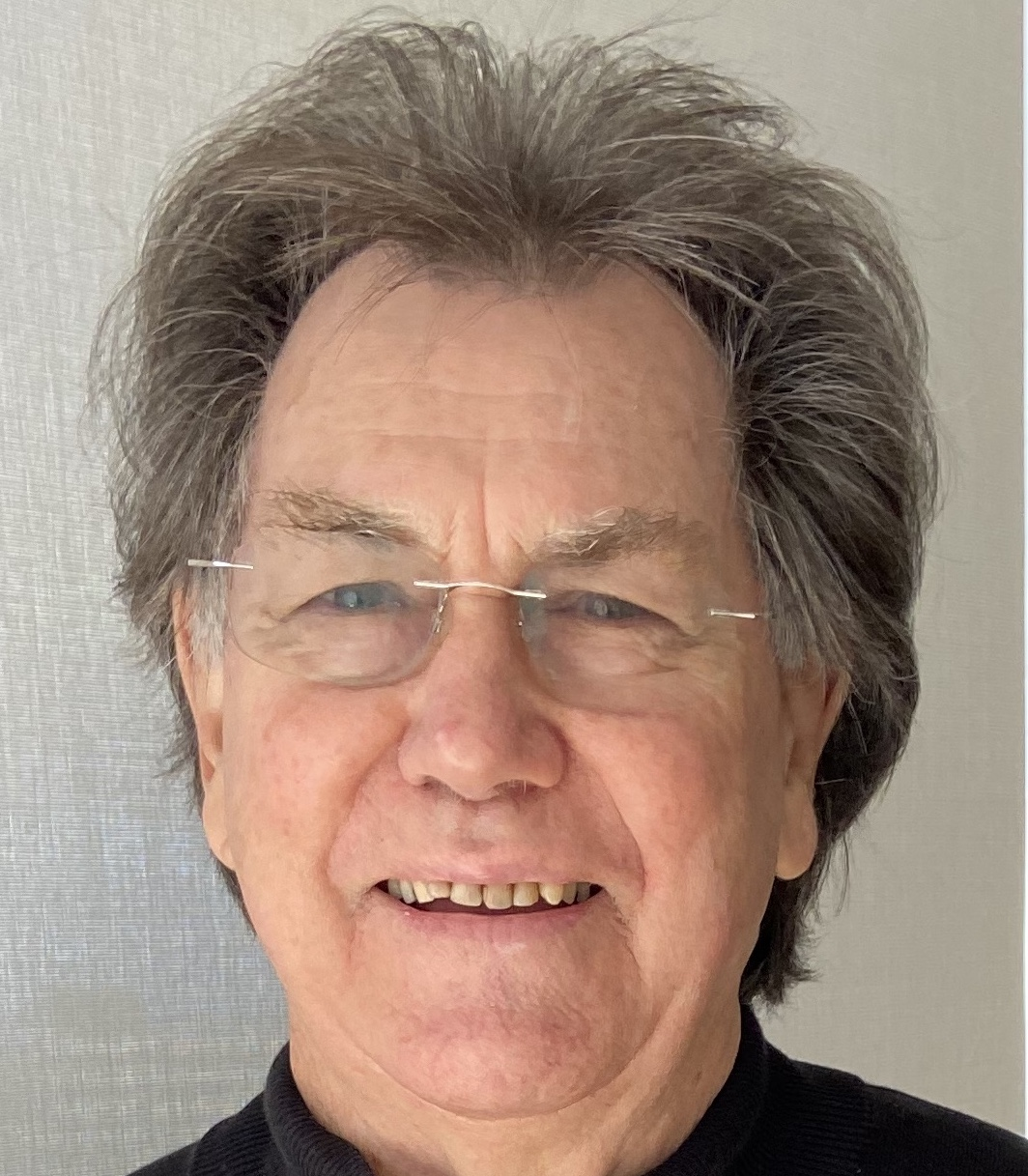
- Conyngham in 2021
- Born: Barry Ernest Conyngham; 27 August 1944 (age 82); Sydney, Australia
- Education: University of Sydney; University of California, San Diego; University of Melbourne
- Occupations: Composer, academic

Barry Ernest Conyngham AM (born 27 August 1944) is an Australian composer and academic. He has over 70 published works and over 30 recordings featuring his compositions, and his works have been premiered or performed in Australia, Japan, North and South America, the United Kingdom and Europe. His output is largely for orchestra, ensemble or dramatic forces. He is an Emeritus Professor of both the University of Wollongong and Southern Cross University. He is former Dean of the Faculty of the Fine Arts and Music at the University of Melbourne.

== Biography ==
Conyngham was born in Sydney. He was initially interested in jazz and studied with Raymond Hanson and Richard Meale, but turned his attention to orchestral writing in the mid-1960s with encouragement from Peter Sculthorpe. He completed a Bachelor of Arts at the University of Sydney in 1967, and a Master of Arts (Hons.) at the same university in 1971. In 1970 he visited Japan on a Churchill Fellowship, where he studied with Toru Takemitsu. This was unusual at the time, as Australian composers typically chose Europe and Britain as their location for further study.

In 1972, he went to the United States on a Harkness Fellowship and gained a Certificate of Post-Doctoral Studies from the University of California, San Diego in 1973. He was a Fellow of Princeton University 1973–74, and Composer-in-Residence at the University of Aix-Marseille in 1974–75. He was a lecturer at the University of Melbourne from 1975 to 1979, then Senior Lecturer 1975–79. He was a visiting scholar at the University of Minnesota, was a Senior Fulbright Fellow in 1982, and that year gained a Doctorate in Music from the University of Melbourne. He became professor and head of the School of Creative Arts at the University of Wollongong 1989–94. He was the Foundation Vice-Chancellor of Southern Cross University 1994–2000, based in Lismore, New South Wales.

He was the first musician to hold the chair of Australian studies at Harvard University (2000–2001).

In 1978, he won the Albert H. Maggs Composition Award (he won it again in 2008). In 1997, he was appointed a Member of the Order of Australia (AM), "for service to music as a composer and to music education and administration".

In 2000, Barry Conyngham was invited to give the second annual Peggy Glanville-Hicks address for the Sydney Spring Festival.

In 2003, he was given a commission by the Ian Potter Music Commission Fellowship.

Conyngham has been involved with a number of arts organisations, including the World Music Council, Opera Australia, the Australian Music Centre and the Swiss Global Artistic Foundation. He has also been chairman of the Music Board of the Australia Council.

After retiring from academic life to concentrate on composition and music performance, on 22 December 2010 he was appointed Dean of the Faculty of the VCA and Music at the University of Melbourne.

== Works ==
- Bennelong (about the Australian Aborigine Bennelong; included puppets by Mirka Mora)

PUBLISHED SCORES

(Universal Edition London, Vienna. Boosey & Hawkes London, Sydney. Hal Leonard/CoEdition Melbourne.)

- CRISIS: THOUGHTS IN A CITY (1968) for orchestra UE 29004
- THE LITTLE SHERIFF (1969) for solo piano UE 29132
- FIVE WINDOWS (1969) for orchestra UE 29007
- THREE (1969) for string quartet and percussion UE 29010
- FIVE (1970) for wind quintet UE 29088
- WATER...FOOTSTEPS...TIME... (1970) for orchestra UE 29060
- ICE CARVING (1970) for orchestra UE 29085
- PLAYBACK (1972) for solo contrabass and 4-channel tape UE 29081
- WITHOUT GESTURE (1973) for orchestra UE 29080
- FROM VOSS (1973) for soprano and percussion UE 29090(10)
- EDWARD JOHN EYRE (1971–73) chamber opera UE 29067
- SNOWFLAKE (1973) solo for keyboards UE 29082
- SIX (1971) for percussion and orchestra UE 29128
- MIRROR IMAGES (1975) for ensemble UE 29127
- NED (1974–77) opera UE 29133
- SKY (1977) for string orchestra UE 29212
- THE APOLOGY OF BONY ANDERSON (1978) opera UE 29218
- MIRAGES (1978) for orchestra UE 29223
- BONY ANDERSON (1978) chamber opera UE 29225
- SHADOWS OF NOH Concerto for Double Bass (1979) UE 29244(20)
- BASHO (1980) for soprano and ensemble UE 29239
- JOURNEYS (1980) solo wind (clarinets and saxophones) UE 29242
- VIOLA (1981) for solo viola UE 29222
- IMAGINARY LETTERS (1981) for chamber choir UE 29230
- HORIZONS, Concerto for Orchestra (1980) UE 29270
- SOUTHERN CROSS, Concerto for Violin and Piano (1981) UE 29252
- DWELLINGS (1982) for ensemble UE 29255
- VOICINGS (1983) for ensemble and tape UE 29265
- CELLO CONCERTO (1984) for cello and string orchestra UE 29262
- FLY (1982–84) opera UE 29338(30)
- PREVIEW (1984) for solo cello UE 29292
- ANTIPODES (1984–85) for orchestra, chorus and soloists UE 29300
- GENERATIONS (1985) for orchestra UE 29300
- THE OATH OF BAD BROWN BILL (1985) children's opera UE 29303
- RECURRENCES (1986) for large orchestra UE29323
- VAST I 'The Sea' (1987) for orchestra UE 29326
- VAST II 'The Coast' (1987) for orchestra UE 29329
- VAST III 'The Centre' (1987) for orchestra UE 29332
- VAST IV 'The Cities' (1987) for orchestra UE 29335
- GLIMPSES (1987) for chamber orchestra UE 29348(40)
- BENNELONG (1988) puppet opera UE 29345
- MATILDA (1988) chorus and orchestra UE 29340
- STREAMS (1988) for flute, harp and viola UE 29350
- MONUMENTS, Concerto for Piano (1989) UE 29400
- WATERWAYS, Concerto for Viola (1990) UE 29401
- CLOUDLINES, Concerto for Harp (1991) UE 29500
- AWAKENINGS (1991) for solo harp UE 29501
- SHININGS (1992) for ensemble UE 29550
- DECADES (1992) for orchestra UE 29552
- BUNDANON (1994) for piano and orchestra Boosey&Hawkes(50)
- AFTERIMAGES (1993) for koto and percussion UE 29560
- AFTERIMAGES 2 (1994) for koto and orchestra Boosey&Hawkes
- DAWNING (1996) for orchestra Boosey&Hawkes
- NOSTALGIA (1997) for string orchestra Boosey&Hawkes
- PASSING (1998) for orchestra Boosey&Hawkes
- YEARNINGS (1999) for ensemble Boosey&Hawkes
- STRING QUARTET (1999) Boosey&Hawkes
- SEASONS (2000) for percussion and orchestra Boosey&Hawkes
- FLUTE (2001) for solo flute Boosey&Hawkes
- ANTIPODS (2001) for two pianos Boosey&Hawkes(60)
- ORGAN (2001) for organ Boosey&Hawkes
- FIX (2001–2004) for solo baritone and orchestra Boosey&Hawkes
- PLAYGROUND (2002) for violin, clarinet and piano Boosey&Hawkes
- VEILS 1 (2003) for solo piano Boosey&Hawkes
- VEILS 2 (2003) for solo piano (written for the Indonesian pianist Ananda Sukarlan ) Boosey&Hawkes
- DREAMS GO WANDERING STILL (2003) orchestra Hal Leonard/CoEdition
- CATHEDRAL 1 (2005) for cello and piano Hal Leonard/CoEdition
- NOW THAT DARKNESS (2005) for orchestra Hal Leonard/CoEdition
- CATHEDRAL 2 (2006) for clarinet and piano Hal Leonard/CoEdition
- TO THE EDGE (2006) for chamber orchestra Hal Leonard/CoEdition (70)
- ELECTRIC LENIN (2005–6) chamber opera Hal Leonard/CoEdition
- STRING QUARTET 3 (2007) (Bushfire Dreaming) Hal Leonard/CoEdition
- CALA TUENT (2007–8) orchestra & folk instruments Hal Leonard/CoEdition
- KANGAROO ISLAND, Concerto for Double Bass (2009) Hal Leonard/CoEdition
- SHOWBOAT KALANG (2010) for ensemble Hal Leonard/CoEdition
- GARDENER OF TIME (2009–11) for orchestra Hal Leonard/CoEdition
- FALLINGWATER (2011) two bassoons and orchestra Hal Leonard/CoEdition
- SILHOUETTES (2011) Flute and Guitar Hal Leonard/CoEdition
- SYMPHONY (2012) for orchestra Hal Leonard/CoEdition
- TIME TIDES TENDERNESS (2013) piano trio and strings Hal Leonard/CoEdition(80)
- DRYSPELL...DELUGE (2014) Ensemble Hal Leonard/CoEdition
- ANZAC (2014) for Nine Soloist and orchestra Hal Leonard/CoEdition
- GATHERING (2015) for 8–24 cellos Hal Leonard/CoEdition
- DIASPORAS (2016) for orchestra Hal Leonard/CoEdition
- PETRACHOR (2017) for Chamber Orchestra Composer
- BUSHFIRE DREAMING (2018) for String Orchestra Composer
- ONE SMALL STEP (2019) for orchestra Hal Leonard/Composer
- MALLORCA SERENADE (2019) Guitar & Chamber Orchestra Composer
- HAIKU (2021) for piano Composer
- SYMPHONY 2(2021) for orchestra Composer
- HAIKU (2022) for Piano CoEdition
- IMAGES (2023) fro Alto Saxophone and Piano CoEdition
- SHORELINE (2024) for Orchestra (Melbourne Grammar Senior School Orchestra) CoEdition
- FULL MOON (2024) for Orchestra CoEdition

== Awards and nominations ==
=== ARIA Music Awards ===
The ARIA Music Awards is an annual awards ceremony that recognises excellence, innovation, and achievement across all genres of Australian music. They commenced in 1987.

Year	Nominee / work	Award	Result	Ref.
1987	Southern Cross Ice Carving	Best Classical Album	Won	

== Sources ==
- Harvard University Gazette

Academic offices
New title	Vice-Chancellor of Southern Cross University; 1994 – 2000	Succeeded by Paul Clark
