= Christian Helleman =

Australian composer, conductor and organist

Gorjes Christian Crawford Hellemann
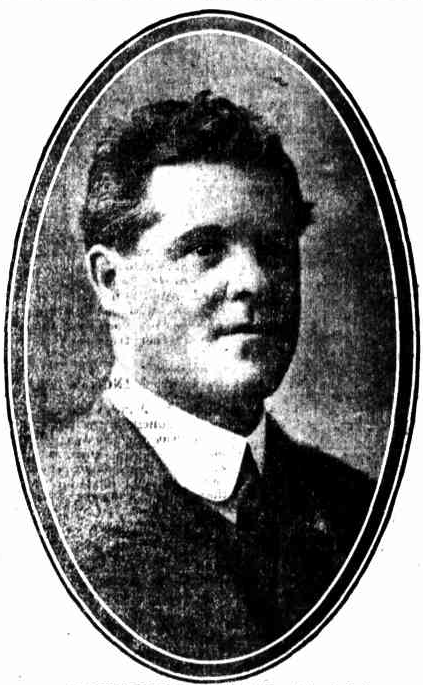
- Christian Helleman 1910

Background information
- Born: 1880; Goulburn, New South Wales, Australia
- Died: February 26, 1954
- Occupations: Composer, Organist
- Years active: 1900-1930

Gorjes Christian Crawford-Hellemann (Christian Helleman) was an Australian composer, conductor and organist. He was born in 1881 to William Thomas and Harriet Ann Crawford-Hellemann in Towrang, NSW Australia. He was an Associate of the Royal College of Music. He was organist of Christ Church St Laurence, Sydney, 1927–31 and 1933–34. He died 26 February 1954.

On 11 June 1907 he was married to Olive May Barber at St Stephen's in Newtown, Sydney. They had five children. In retirement he lived at 22 Bury Street Guildford, New South Wales.

== Works ==
Boona Schottische 1899 by Christian Helleman
MIDI version

Air de Ballet 1923 opus 15 by Christian Helleman
MIDI version

- 1935 Father Time / words by Muggridge
- Humorette
- March Mignon
- Rhapsodette
- 1909 Valse Caprice Op. 35
- Youthful fancies [music]: 20 songs for children / words by Anne Mitchell; music by Christian Helleman
- The last of his tribe – words by Henry Kendall and music by Christian Helleman
- 1937 The water-lily words by Henry Lawson + music by Christian Hellemann
- The magpie's song / music by Chiristian Hellemann; words by Samuel Cornstalk
- 1937 When lark sings high / words by Franklin S. Walker; music by Christian Hellemann
- Always somewhere / words by Harry Ransom; music by Christian Hellemann
- Valse Caprice
- A whiskey/words Bruce Irvine
- Ay-de-mi
- Chanson Arabe
- Off to the Front
- Johnnie we're proud of you

== held by Australian music centre ==
- Australia: cantata for chorus and orchestra / author, Fred. I. Bloomfield; composer, Christian Hellemann
- Chorale epilogue: from the lyric drama – Mariah / librettist – William Beattie; composer – Christian Hellemann
- Songs Jesting toper / words by Bruce Irvine; music by Christian Hellemann – Play the game / author Bruce Irvine; composer Christian Hellemann
- Lacrimosa: from the Requiem for baritone solo, chorus & orchestra / Christian Hellemann
- Ode / words by H.E. Horne; music specially composed by H.F. Trelorne & Christian Hellemann (full score + parts)
- Springtime: piano score for string quintet, flute, clarinet and piano / Christian Hellemann
- Symphony in C minor for orchestra and female chorus (5 scores)
- Two choral improvisations / Christian Hellemann.
- Unknown warrior / Christian Hellemann.
- Symphony in C minor for orchestra and female chorus
  1. Phantasie
  2. To the Unknown Warrior
  3. Improvisata
  4. Divertimento: concert overture
  5. Apotheosis
