= Christopher Willcock =

Australian Jesuit priest and composer

Christopher Willcock (born 1947) is an Australian Jesuit priest and composer of liturgical music.

== Life ==
Willcock studied music at the Sydney Conservatorium of Music (graduated 1974) and theology in Melbourne with the Jesuit Theological College, a member college of the United Faculty of Theology. He was ordained to the priesthood in 1977. He then pursued doctoral studies in sacramental and liturgical theology at the Institut Catholique de Paris. In 1998, he won the University of Melbourne's Albert H. Maggs Composition Award.

Collaborating with cartoonist and artist Michael Leunig, Willcock won the 2006 Classical Music Award for Choral or Vocal Work of the Year with excerpts from his work titled Southern Star (his cycle of nine Christmas carols composed in collaboration with Leunig). The carols are composed for 4-part adult voices, or 3-part children's voices and are accompanied by harp - reminiscent of Benjamin Britten's A Ceremony of Carols. Other major works have been performed by the Tallis Scholars (May 2000) and the Tasmanian Symphony Orchestra (December 1998).

In 2006 he was the St Thomas More Chair of Jesuit Studies at the University of Western Australia. He also gave the annual Slattery Lecture for the School of Philosophy and Theology at the University of Notre Dame Australia.

In 2004 he was appointed by the Melbourne Chorale as their first composer-in-residence and that year they performed two new a cappella pieces, Etiquette with Angels (a setting of a poem by another Australian Jesuit, Andrew Bullen) and his Latin setting of Psalm 50, Miserere (considered Psalm 51 in some versions of the Bible). The Melbourne Chorale also performed his John Shaw Neilson Triptych in late July 2004.

== Sacred music ==
- Akhmatova Requiem for soprano solo, strings and percussion is a poem cycle by the great 20th-century Russian poet, Anna Akhmatova (1889-1966),
- Etiquette with Angels
- Gospel Bestiary; commissioned for the Tallis Scholars, this is a poem by Andrew Bullen SJ set to music by Willcock.
- Miserere; a setting of the Latin psalm 50
- Missa Messina
- Songs of Prayer
- Psalms for Feasts and Seasons
- In the Peace of Christ, a collection of music for the funeral rites; and
- collections published by Oregon Catholic Press: God Here Among Us, In Remembrance of You, Your Kingdom Come, Sing We Now of Christmas, and Psalms for the Journey.

== Secular and concert music ==
- John Shaw Neilson Triptych for a cappella choir
- Five Days Old, composed for choir and orchestra
- The Frilled Lizard for viola and harp
- Gallopping Goliards composed for solo double bass
- Lines from Little Gidding for choir and organ
- Friday 3.30 for choir and string orchestra
- Plaint over Dili for oboe and harpsichord
- New Song in an Ancient Land
