= Paul Stanhope =

Australian composer

Paul Stanhope is an Australian composer, conductor and music educator, known for his choral and instrumental music.

== Early life and education ==
Stanhope was a student of Andrew Ford, Andrew Schultz and Peter Sculthorpe, and received the Charles Mackerras Scholarship to study at the Guildhall School of Music in London in 2000.

== Composition ==
In May 2004, he won first place at the Toru Takemitsu Composition Award for his work Fantasia on a Theme by Vaughan Williams, and in 2010 was featured composer for Musica Viva, resulting in the following report from artistic director Carl Vine:

Paul Stanhope’s contribution as Featured Composer for the 2010 Season set a new benchmark, with every one of his works standing proudly alongside the finest chamber music presented by our touring artists. His music left a powerful and enduring impression upon the year’s concerts, drawing liberal praise from an unprecedented number of our patrons.

In 2011 Stanhope was awarded two APRA Australian Music Centre awards for the instrumental work of the year. In 2018 he was awarded the orchestral work of the year, and won again in 2017 and 2020. In 2013 and 2014 he was the first composer to receive a Sidney Myer Creative Fellowship.

A commissioned music-drama for large choir and orchestra premiered in 2014 titled Jandamarra: Sing for the Country, based on the life of a North resistance hero of the Bunuba nation of Western Australia.

In December 2022, a short work, Ocean Planet, was premiered by the Sydney Symphony Orchestra as part of their 50 Fanfares project.

== Conducting and teaching ==
Stanhope has held the post of musical director with the Sydney Chamber Choir, and guest conductor of Gondwana Voices/Sydney Children's Choir, and since 2014 has been the artistic chair of the Australia Ensemble at UNSW.

As of 2021 he is associate professor of composition at the University of Sydney, and artistic director of choral programs at the Sydney Conservatorium of Music.

== Awards and nominations ==
=== APRA AMC Art Music Awards ===
Since 2003 APRA AMCOS (Australasian Performing Right Association and Australasian Mechanical Copyright Owners Society) combined with AMC (Australian Music Centre) to present the Classical Music Awards at an annual ceremony. In 2011 they were re-branded as the Art Music Awards.

Year	Nominee / work	Award	Result	Ref.
2003	Marshall McGuire's Arch Window (Paul Stanhope)	Instrumental Work of the Year	Nominated	
2011	Pavel Haas Quartet's String Quartet No. 2 (Stanhope)	Work of the Year – Instrumental	Won	
2011	Choir of Trinity College, Cambridge and Stephen Layton's Deserts of Exile (Stanhope, Jabra Ibrahim Jabra)	Work of the Year – Vocal or Choral	Won	
2011	Jane Sheldon, Ensemble Offspring and Roland Peelman's The Origin Cycle (Stanhope, Elliott Gyger, Kate Neal, Barry Conyngham, Rosalind Page, Elena Kats-Chernin, Nicholas Vines, Dan Walker)	Performance of the Year	Won	
2012	ACO2, Australian Chamber Orchestra and Dale Barltrop's Qinoth (Stanhope)	Work of the Year – Instrumental	Nominated	
2012	Sydney Chamber Choir and Stanhope's Osanna Mass (Clare Maclean)	Work of the Year – Vocal or Choral	Won	
2015	Brett Weymark, Simon Lobelson, Yilimbirri Ensemble, Gondwana Choirs and Sydney Symphony Orchestra's Jandamarra - Sing for the Country (Stanhope, Steve Hawke)	Orchestral Work of the Year	Nominated	
2016	Goldner String Quartet's "String Quartet No. 3" (Stanhope)	Performance of the Year	Nominated	
2017	Adelaide Chamber Singers, Carl Crossin's Agnus Dei (Do Not Stand at My Grave and Weep) (Stanhope, Mary Elizabeth Frye)	Vocal / Choral Work of the Year	Nominated	
2017	Adelaide Chamber Singers, Carl Crossin's Agnus Dei (Do Not Stand at My Grave and Weep) (Stanhope, Mary Elizabeth Frye)	Performance of the Year	Nominated	
2018	Joshua Davis, West Australian Symphony Orchestra and Asher Fisch's "Concerto for Trombone and Orchestra" (Stanhope)	Orchestral Work of the Year	Won	
2020	Gondwana Choirs, Luminescence Chamber Singers, Valla Voices, Hunter Singers, Resonance and Lyn Williams' I Am Martuwarra (Stanhope, Steve Hawke)	Work of the Year: Choral	Won	
2022	Sydney Chamber Choir's Requiem (Stanhope, Oodgeroo Noonuccal, Neela Nath Das, Mary Elizabeth Frye, Emily Dickinson)	Work of the Year: Choral	Won	
2022	Andrew Haveron and Simon Tedeschi's Machine Codes (Stanhope)	Performance of the Year: Notated Composition	Nominated	

=== Other awards ===
- 2004 Winner, Toru Takemitsu Composition Award: Fantasia on a theme of Vaughan Williams
- 2010 First Prize, Albert H Maggs Composition Award
