= Julian Yu =

Julian Jing-Jun Yu (born 2 September 1957) is a Chinese-Australian composer.

== Biography ==
Julian Yu was born in Beijing and studied at the Central Conservatory of Music, where he later worked. In the early 1980s, he studied at the Tokyo College of Music with Jōji Yuasa. In 1984 he married an Australian and the following year he moved to Australia where he taught at the Queensland Conservatorium. He then moved to Melbourne and studied at La Trobe University for a Master's degree with Keith Humble. With the support of an Australia Council Fellowship, he studied with Hans Werner Henze and Oliver Knussen at Tanglewood in 1988 and received the Koussevitzky Tanglewood Prize. He has won over twenty-five prizes, including winning the Paul Lowin Orchestra Prize twice.

== Prizes ==
- Koussevitzky Tanglewood Prize (1988)
- Irino Prize (1989)
- Paul Lowin Orchestral Prizes (1991, 1994)
- Vienna Modern Masters Recording Award (1992), for Wu-Yu

== Compositions ==
- Impromptu (1982)
- Scintillation II (1987)
- 3 Haiku (1987)
- Scintillation (1987)
- Wu-Yu (1987)
- Medium Ornamental Fuga Canonica (1988)
- Great Ornamented Fuga Canonica (1988)
- Reclaimed Prefu (1989-90)
- The White Snake (1990), a puppet opera
- Reclaimed Prefix II (1991)

== Recordings of Yu's work ==
- Classical Allusion: Selected Works by Julian Yu (2000, Move Records, MD 3207, OCLC 222743895)
- China Wind: Robert Schubert plays the clarinet music of Julian Yu (2012, Move Records, MD 3351, OCLC 849711216)
- For our Natural World: Julian Yu Works (2012, Nippon Acoustic Records, NARD-5039, OCLC 988950247)
- 126 Variations on Twinkle Twinkle Little Star (2015, Move Records, MD 3404, OCLC 1030203922)
- Old and Yu: The Clarinet Music of Julian Yu, Volume 2 (2018, Move Records, MD 3424, OCLC 1086292255)
