= Brenton Broadstock =

Australian composer

Brenton Broadstock AM
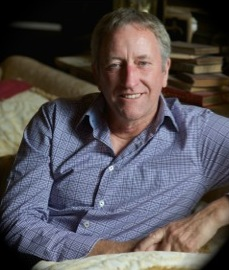
- Born: 12 December 1952 (age 73); Melbourne, Australia
- Era: Contemporary classical music

Brenton Thomas Broadstock AM (born 12 December 1952) is an Australian composer. He was appointed a Member of the Order of Australia on Australia Day in 2014 for "significant service to music as a composer, educator and mentor".

== Biography ==
From 1982 to 2006 Broadstock was employed in the Faculty of Music, University of Melbourne, as Professor of Music and Head of Composition. During 2007 he was a Vice-Chancellor's Fellow at the university.

In 2008 Broadstock's music was performed at the Opening Ceremony of the 2008 Summer Olympics and in 2009 he was composer-in-residence with the Melbourne Symphony Orchestra, composing a multi-instrumental concerto, Made in Heaven, for trumpeter James Morrison, a chamber concertino, Hall of Mirrors, for trombonist Brett Kelly and a symphony for soloists, choir and orchestra, Tyranny of Distance.

Broadstock has won prizes for composition, including first prize in the 1981 Townsville Pacific Festival's National Composition Competition for his orchestral work Festive Overture; two Albert H. Maggs Awards; two APRA Music Awards for his orchestral works The Mountain and Toward the Shining Light; first prize in the Hambacher Preis International Composers' Competition, West Germany, for his Tuba Concerto; and in 1994 he received the Paul Lowin Song Cycle Award, Australia's richest composition prize, for Bright Tracks for mezzo-soprano and string trio. His orchestral work Stars in a Dark Night (Symphony No. 2) received four Sounds Australian National Music Critics' Awards including Best Australian Orchestral Work in 1989 and was the Australian Broadcasting Corporation's entry to the prestigious International Rostrum of Composers in Paris in 1990 and in Helsinki in 2014 (Never Truly Lost was a 'recommended work').

In 1988-89 he was the Melbourne Symphony Orchestra's inaugural composer-in-residence. In 1997 he received the Jean Bogan Prize for his solo piano work Dying of the Light and in 1998 he received the Michelle Morrow Memorial Award for Composition and an Explorations Opera Project grant. In 1998 he spent three months in Italy on fellowships awarded by the Civitella Ranieri Foundation and a Bellagio Award from the Rockefeller Foundation. In November 2005 he returned to Italy as a fellow at the Ligurian Study Center in Bogliasco, Italy.

In 1999 he received the prestigious Don Banks Music Award from the Australia Council for his contribution to Australian music, which enabled him to compose for most of that year, including visits to the USA (visiting professor of composition at Indiana University), England and Russia. Five of his six symphonies were recorded by the Krasnoyarsk Symphony Orchestra (Russia) conducted by Andrew Wheeler and released on the Etcetera label in 2000 and received excellent reviews in England and Australia.

In 2004 Broadstock's solo piano work Torre di Forza was the test piece at the Sydney International Piano Competition, and in 2005 ABC Classics released a CD of orchestral works performed by the Tasmanian Symphony Orchestra conducted by Ola Rudner. His chamber opera based on Ray Bradbury's Fahrenheit 451 was performed in German at Oper Bonn, Germany, in April 2006.

Since 2008 he has been a freelance composer and lives on the Sunshine Coast in Queensland, Australia.

His opera The Nurses at Vung Tau premiered in 2022 in Brisbane. Based on Annabell Brayley's 2017 book, Our Vietnam Nurses, the opera deals with the experience of an Australian nurse in Vũng Tàu and is meant as a tribute to Australian women in the Vietnam War.

== Awards and honours ==
=== Paul Lowin Award ===
In 1994 he received the Paul Lowin Song Cycle Award, Australia's richest composition prize, for Bright Tracks for mezzo-soprano and string trio.

=== Don Banks Music Award ===
The Don Banks Music Award was established in 1984 to publicly honour a senior artist of high distinction who has made an outstanding and sustained contribution to music in Australia.

In 1999 Broadstock was awarded The Don Banks Music Award.

=== The Albert Maggs Award ===
Broadstock received the Maggs Award in 1984 and 2013.

=== Order of Australia ===
In the 2014 Australia Day Honours List he was appointed AM - a Member of the Order of Australia.
