= Don Banks =

Australian composer

- Born: Donald Oscar Banks; 25 October 1923; Australia
- Died: 5 September 1980 (aged 56); McMahons Point, New South Wales, Australia
- Occupation: Music composer

Donald Oscar Banks (25 October 1923 – 5 September 1980) was an Australian composer of concert, jazz, and commercial music.

== Early life and education ==
Jazz was Banks' earliest and strongest musical influence. He learned the saxophone as a boy in Australia and was proficient enough to be invited to play in the Graeme Bell band, then one of the finest outside America. He served with the Australian Army Medical Corps from 1941 to 1946. Afterward, he studied piano, harmony, and counterpoint. Banks then attended the University of Melbourne Conservatorium of Music for two years before moving to Europe in 1950.

In the UK, he studied composition with Mátyás Seiber, who was very interested in jazz, from 1950 to 1952. Banks became a friend and associate of Gunther Schuller and was involved with Tubby Hayes, writing several compositions for him. There were also periods of study in Salzburg with modernist Milton Babbitt and in Florence with composer Luigi Dallapiccola.

== Career ==
In the 1950s, Banks was the secretary to Edward Clark, head of the London Contemporary Music Centre. He was chairman of the Society for the Promotion of New Music (SPNM) in 1967–68, and held several other posts in London while living in Purley, Surrey (at 16 Box Ridge Avenue). While in the UK during the 1960s, his primary source of income came from scoring horror films produced by Hammer Studios, including Rasputin the Mad Monk, The Frozen Dead, and The Mummy’s Shroud.

Banks returned to Australia in 1972 as Head of Composition and Electronic Music Studies at the Canberra School of Music. He remained there until 1977, after which he held a series of educational positions. In 1978 he was appointed head of the School of Composition at the New South Wales Conservatorium of Music.

Banks died at his home in the Sydney suburb of McMahons Point in September 1980 after an eight-year battle with chronic lymphocytic leukemia.

The Don Banks Music Award, established in 1984, is funded by the Australia Council for the Arts.

== Music ==
Banks's regarded his Opus No. 1 as his Violin Sonata of 1953, although he wrote earlier works, including both a piano sonatina and trio in 1948. Five North Country Folk Songs, also from 1953, clearly shows the influence of Mátyás Seiber. His best-known concert works include the Sonata da Camera for flute, clarinet, bass clarinet, piano, percussion, violin, viola, and cello (1961, dedicated to Seiber); Horn Concerto (1965, dedicated to and premiered by Barry Tuckwell); Trio for horn, violin, and piano (1962); Violin Concerto (1968), and Nexus, his major third stream composition.

Banks scored 19 feature films, 22 documentaries, and more than 60 episodes of various television series. Nearly half of his movie scores were for Hammer Films. Composer Douglas Gamley said that Banks "was a twelve-tone/serial composer who revelled in the opportunity to write abrasive and highly dissonant scores in an idiom akin to that of the late Schoenberg." Randall Larson has said that The Reptile (1968) is perhaps Banks's best Hammer score. Banks also composed jazz scores for Hammer, including Hysteria (1964). He also worked regularly with Halas & Batchelor on cartoon films, scoring more than 70 shorts, advertisements, and animated television series.

== Compositions ==
=== Orchestral works ===
- Four Pieces for Orchestra (1953)
- Coney Island (1961)
- Elizabethan Miniatures (1962)
- Horn Concerto (1965)
- Assemblies (1966)
- Violin Concerto (1968)
- Intersections for Orchestra and Electronics (1969)
- Prospects (1973)
- Trilogy (1979)

=== Chamber and instrumental ===
- Sonatina in C♯ minor for piano (1948)
- Trio for flute, violin and cello (1948)
- Sonata for violin and piano (1953)
- Three Studies for cello and piano (1954)
- Pezzo Dramatico (1956) (for pianist Margaret Kitchin)
- Sonata da Camera (1961)
- Trio for horn, violin and piano (1962) (for Barry Tuckwell)
- Prologue, Night Piece and Blues for Two for clarinet and piano (1968)
- String Quartet (1975)

=== Vocal ===
- Five North Country Folk Songs (1953) (for soprano Sophie Weisse)
- Tirade for mezzo-soprano and chamber ensemble (1968) (words, Peter Porter)

=== Third stream/crossover works ===
- Equations I (1963) for jazz and chamber players
- Meeting Place (1970) for jazz ensemble, symphony orchestra and synthesizer
- Equations II for jazz and chamber players
- Nexus (1971) for jazz quintet and symphony orchestra

== Filmography ==
Banks is credited for composing music in the following films:

- The Price of Silence (1959)
- Murder at Site 3 (1959)
- The Third Alibi (1961)
- Captain Clegg (Night Creatures in U.S.) (1962)
- Panic (1963)
- The Punch and Judy Man (1963)
- The Evil of Frankenstein (1964)
- Crooks in Cloisters (1964)
- Nightmare (1964)
- Hysteria (1964)
- The Brigand of Kandahar (1965)
- Monster of Terror (Die, Monster, Die! in U.S.) (1965)
- The Reptile (1966)
- Rasputin the Mad Monk (1966)
- The Frozen Dead (1966)
- Torture Garden (1967)
- The Mummy's Shroud (1967)
