= List of Australian composers =

This is a list of Australian composers of classical music, contemporary music and film soundtracks.

These names are largely drawn from the following:

- Music Australia an online service developed by the National Library of Australia (NLA) and the National Film and Sound Archive (NFSA);
- Australian Music Centre's (AMC) list of "Represented artists";
- lists entitled "Australian Composers" and "Australian Repertoire" published by Australian Choral Conductors Education and Training (ACCET);
- the "Catalogue of Australian Organ Compositions 1866–2002" published by the Organ Historical Trust of Australia (OHTA);
- the "Australian Composers" list;

and various other websites and media sources.

Wherever possible, dates of birth and death are shown. The pseudonyms used by some composers are listed along with a reference back to their legal name. Entries are cross-referenced to one or more sources to provide further information.

== A ==
- Roy Agnew (1891–1944)
- David Ahern (1947–1988)
- Hugo Alpen (1842–1917)
- Ernie Althoff (born 1950)
- John Henry Antill (1904–1986)
- Albert Arlen (1905–1993)
- Martin Armiger (1949–2019)
- Keith Asboe (born 1929)

== B ==
- Tony Backhouse (born 1947)
- Don Banks (1923–1980)
- David Banney (born 1968)
- Michael Barkl (born 1958)
- Betty Beath (born 1932)
- Ross Bolleter (born 1946)
- Anne Elizabeth Boyd (born 1946)
- George Frederick Boyle (1886–1948)
- Philip Bračanin (born 1942)
- May (or Mary) Hannah Brahe (1884–1956)
- Hooper Brewster-Jones (1887–1949)
- Brenton Broadstock (born 1952)
- Amanda Gabrielle Brown (born 1965)
- Colin Brumby (1933–2018)
- Vera Buck (1903–1986)
- Thomas (Tom) Edward Bulch (1860–1930)
- Warren Burt (born 1949)
- Nigel Butterley (1935–2022)

== C ==
- John Carmichael (born 1930)
- Ann Carr-Boyd (born 1938)
- Tristram Ogilvie Cary (1925–2008)
- Nick Cave (born 1957)
- Herbert Hedwan Chandler (1865–1941).
- Charles Cawthorne (1854–1925)
- Alice Charbonnet-Kellermann (1858–1914)
- Charlie Chan (born 1966)
- Arthur Chanter (1886–1950)
- Deborah Cheetham (born 1964)
- David Chesworth (born 1958)
- Andrew Chubb (born 1975)
- Paul Clift (born 1978)
- Judith Clingan (born 1945)
- George H. Clutsam (1866–1951)
- Julian Cochran (born 1974)
- Percy Code (1888–1953)
- Barry Conyngham (born 1944)
- Herbert Cosgrove (died 1953)
- Vince Courtney (1887–1951)
- Kate Crawford (born 1976)
- Ian Cresswell (born 1968)
- Ian Cugley (1945–2010)
- Leah Curtis
- Cesare Cutolo (1826–1867)

== D ==
- Robert Davidson (born 1965)
- Ruby Claudia Davy (1883–1946)
- Brett Dean (born 1961)
- George De Cairos Rego (1858–1946)
- George Savin De Chanéet (1861–1926)
- John Albert Delany (1852–1907)
- Herbert De Pinna (1880–1936)
- Matthew Dewey (born 1984)
- Joe Dolce (born 1947)
- Paul Doornbusch (born 1959)
- George Dreyfus (born 1928)
- Jon Drummond (born 1969)
- Catherine Duc
- Melissa Dunphy (born 1980)

== E ==
- Ross Edwards (born 1943)
- Frederick Ellard (1824–1874)
- Warren Ellis (born 1965)
- Harry Lindley Evans (1895–1982)
- Winsome Evans (born 1941)

== F ==
- Billy Field (born 1953)
- Mary Finsterer (born 1962)
- Thomas Fitzgerald
- Samantha Fonti (born 1973)
- Andrew Ford (born 1957)
- Riccardo Formosa (born 1954)
- Grant Foster (born 1945)
- Jennifer Fowler (born 1939)
- Edwin Fowles (1871–1945)

== G ==
- Lisa Gerrard (born 1961)
- Helen Gifford (born 1935)
- Richard Gill (1941–2018)
- Paolo Giorza (1832–1914)
- Peggy Glanville-Hicks (1912–1990)
- Isador Goodman (1909–1982)
- Eugene Goossens (1893–1962)
- Christopher Gordon (born 1956)
- Tony Gould
- Paul Grabowsky (born 1958)
- Ron Grainer (1922–1981)
- George Percy Aldridge Grainger (1882–1961)
- Sally Greenaway (born 1984)
- Stuart Greenbaum (born 1966)
- Maria Grenfell (born 1969)
- Eric Gross (1926–2011)

== H ==
- Gordon Hamilton (born 1982)
- Ronald Hanmer (1917–1994)
- Raymond Hanson (1913–1976)
- Edith Harrhy (1893–1969)
- Ian Keith Harris (1935–2024)
- Fritz Bennicke Hart (1874–1949)
- Michael Kieran Harvey (born 1961)
- Mick Harvey (born 1958)
- Miska Hauser (1822–1887)
- Fiona Joy Hawkins (born 1964)
- Christian Heim (born 1960)
- Christian Helleman (1880–1954)
- Moya Henderson (born 1941)
- Laurence Henry Hicks (1912–1997)
- Francis Hartwell Henslowe (1811–1878)
- Moritz Heuzenroeder (1849–1897)
- Alfred Francis Hill (1869–1960)
- Matthew Hindson (born 1968)
- David Hirschfelder (born 1960)
- Dulcie Sybil Holland (1913–2000)
- Alan Holley (born 1954)
- Wilfrid Holland (1920–2005)
- Charles Edward Horsley (1822–1876)
- Robert Watson Hughes (1912–2007)
- Frank Hutchens (1892–1965)
- Miriam Beatrice Hyde (1913–2005)

== I ==
- Robert Iolini (born 1960)

== J ==
- William Garnet James (1892–1977)
- Graham Jenkin (born 1938)
- Alan John (born 1958)

== K ==
- Elena Kats-Chernin (born 1957)
- Donald H. Kay (born 1933)
- Norman Kaye (1927–2007)
- Horace Keats (1895–1945)
- Paul Kelly (born 1955)
- Paul Kenny (born 1969)
- Frederick Septimus Kelly (1881–1916)
- Gordon Kerry (born 1961)
- Henry John King (1855–1934)
- Ashley Klose
- William Robert Knox (1861–1933)
- Douglas Knehans (born 1957)
- Julian Knowles (born 1965)
- Graeme Koehne (born 1956)
- Constantine Koukias (born 1965)
- Henri Kowalski (1841–1916)
- Henry Krips (1912–1987)

== L ==
- Brenton Langbein (1928–1993)
- Guglielmo Enrico Lardelli (1857–1910)
- Louis Lavater (1867–1953)
- Lê Tuấn Hùng (born 1960)
- Stephen Leek (born 1959)
- Dorian Le Gallienne (1915–1963)
- John Lemmone (1861–1949)
- Georges Lentz (born 1965)
- Liza Lim (born 1966)
- Carl (or Karl) Ferdinand August Linger (a.k.a. Charles Linger) (1810–1862)
- Michael Lira (born 1975)
- Alexander Frame Lithgow (1870–1929)
- Jonathan Little (born 1965)
- William Lovelock (1899–1986)
- David Lumsdaine (1931–2024)
- Jack Lumsdaine (1895–1948)

== M ==
- Mary Mageau (1934–2020)
- Raffaele Marcellino (born 1964)
- Stephen Hale Marsh (1805–1888)
- George Marshall-Hall (1862–1915)
- Arthur Massey (composer) (1861–1950)
- Mona McBurney (1867–1932)
- John McAll (born 1960)
- Daniel Clive McCallum (born 1989)
- Charles William McCarthy (1848–1919)
- David McCormack (born 1968)
- Peter Dodds McCormick (1833–1916)
- Brett McKern (born 1972)
- Sir William McKie (1901–1984)
- Richard Meale (1932–2009)
- Doris Rosetta Elizabeth Mendoza (1899–1986), Australian pianist and theatre composer
- Sir Jonathan Mills (born 1963)
- Richard Mills (born 1949)
- Ernest Edwin Mitchell (1865–1951)
- Kate Moore (born 1979)
- Stephen Moreno (1889–1953)
- Graeme Morton
- Ian Munro (born 1963)
- William Murdoch (1888–1942)

== N ==
- Ronald O. Nagorcka (born 1948)
- Isaac Nathan (1792–1864)
- Mike Nock (born 1940)

== O ==
- Sean O'Boyle (born 1963)
- Tony O'Connor (1961–2010)
- William Arundel (Bunny) Orchard (1867–1961)

== P ==
- Charles Sandys Packer (1810–1883)
- Frederick Augustus Packer (1839–1902)
- George Palmer (born 1947)
- Katharine "Kitty" Parker (1886–1971)
- Anthony Pateras (born 1979)
- Raimund Pechotsch (1864–1941)
- James Penberthy (1917–1999)
- Michael (Mike) Perjanik
- Barrington Somers Pheloung (1954–2019)
- Linda Phillips (1899–2002)

== Q ==
- Will Quintrell (1880–1946)

== R ==
- Bert Rache (1876–1928)
- Stephen Rae (born 1961)
- Alan Rattray (1878–1919)
- Graeme Revell (born 1955)
- Ruby Reynolds-Lewis (1881–1964)
- Damien Ricketson (born 1973)
- Arthur Rivers (1857–1940)
- Sir William Robinson (1834–1897)
- John Rodgers (1962–2024)
- Hermann Rosendorff (1860–1935)
- David Rumsey (1939–2017)

== S ==
- Wilbur Sampson (1914–1958)
- Arline Sauer
- Albert Bokhare Saunders (1880–1946)
- Andrew Schultz (born 1960)
- Peter Sculthorpe (1929–2014)
- Luscombe Searelle (1853–1907)
- Matthew Shlomowitz (born 1975)
- Thanapoom Sirichang (born 1981)
- Larry Sitsky (born 1934)
- Cezary Skubiszewski (born 1949)
- Jan Skubiszewski (born 1981)
- Joe Slater (1872–1926)
- Roger Smalley (1943–2015)
- Michael Sollis (born 1985)
- Benjamin Speed, film composer
- William Stanley (composer) (1820–1902)
- Reginald Alberto Agrati Stoneham (1879–1942)
- Robert James Stove (born 1961)
- Joseph Summers (1839–1917)
- May Summerbelle (1867–1914)
- Margaret Sutherland (1897–1984)

== T ==
- Peter Tahourdin (1928–2009)
- Henry Tate (1873–1926)
- George Tibbits (1933–2008)
- Katia Tiutiunnik (born 1967)
- Richard Tognetti (born 1965)
- George William Torrance (1835–1907)
- Ernest Truman (1869–1948)
- Costas Tsicaderis (1945–2004)
- Walter J. Turner (1884–1946)
- Joseph Twist (born 1982)

== V ==
- Lindsay Vickery (born 1965)
- Carl Edward Vine (born 1954)
- Nicholas Vines (born 1976)
- Alexander Voltz (born 1999)

== W ==
- Don Walker (born 1951)
- Simon Walker (1961–2010)
- Felix Werder (1922–2012)
- Martin Wesley-Smith (1945–2019)
- Fred Werner (active 1895–1912)
- Nigel Westlake (born 1958)
- Alfred Wheeler (1865–1949)
- Gillian Whitehead (born 1941)
- Stephen Whittington (born 1953)
- Christopher Willcock (born 1947)
- Malcolm Williamson (1931–2003)
- David Worrall (born 1954)

== Y ==
- Yitzhak Yedid (born 1971)

== Z ==
- Alberto Zelman (1832–1907)

== See also ==
- Chronological list of Australian classical composers
- List of Australian women composers
