= Chronological list of Australian classical composers =

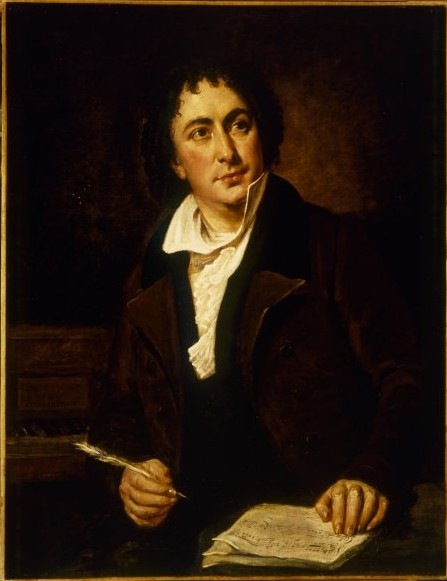
Isaac Nathan c. 1820

This is a list of Australian musical composers.

== Romantic ==
- Isaac Nathan (1790–1864)
- Carl Ferdinand August Linger (1810–1862)
- Charles Sandys Packer (1810–1883)
- Francis Hartwell Henslowe (1811–1878)
- William Vincent Wallace (1812–1865)
- Rosendo Salvado (1814–1900)
- William Stanley (1820–1902)
- Charles Edward Horsley (1822–1876)
- Frederick Ellard (1824–1874)
- Siede, Julius (1825–1903)
- Paolo Giorza (1832–1914)
- William Robinson (1834–1897)
- George William Torrance (1835–1907)
- Frederick Augustus Packer (1839–1902)
- Joseph Summers (1839–1917)
- Leon Francois Victor Caron (1850–1907)
- Moritz Heuzenroeder (1849–1897)
- MacCarthy, Charles William (1848–1919)
- Guglielmo Enrico Lardelli (1850–1910)
- Alice Charbonnet-Kellermann (1850–1913)
- John Albert Delany (1852–1907)
- Cawthorne, Charles Wittowitto (1854–1925)
- Barnett, Neville George (1854–1895)
- Hermann Rosendoff (1860–1935)
- John Lemmone (1861–1949)
- Mona McBurney (1862–1932)
- Georgette Peterson (1863–1947)
- Florence Maude Ewart (1864–1949)
- Alfred Wheeler (composer) (1865–1949)
- George Howard Clutsam (1866–1951)
- Jack (Moolbong) Johnson (1868–1943)
- Alfred Hill (1869-1960)
- Alex Frame Lithgow (1870–1929)
- Vince Courtney (unknown active 1907–1939)
- Ernest Truman
- Rosendo Salvado (1870–1900)
- Johannes Heyer (1872–1945)
- Fritz Hart (1874–1949)
- Louis Lavater (1876–1953)
- Reginald Alberto Agrati Stoneham (1879–1942)
- Frederick Septimus Kelly (1881–1916 killed in action)
- Hooper Brewster-Jones (1887–1949)
- Percy Code (1888–1953)
- Horace Keats (1895–1945)
- John (Jack) Sinclair Lumsdaine (1895–1948)
- Walter Marwood Du Boulay (1898–1947)
- Hugo Alpen (1842–1917)
- Thomas Bulch (1862–1930)
- Roy Agnew (1891–1944)
- Stephen Moreno (1889–1953)
- Walter James Redfern Turner (1889–1946)
- Leo Paul Schramm (1892–1953)
- Thomas Wood (1892–1950)

== Modern/contemporary ==
- Alfred Hill (1869–1960)
- Mirrie Hill (1889–1986)
- Arthur Benjamin (1893–1960)
- John Antill (1904–1986)
- Charles Zwar (1911–1989)
- Peggy Glanville-Hicks (1912–1990)
- Dulcie Holland (1913–2000)
- Miriam Hyde (1913–2005)
- Peter Sculthorpe (1929–2014)
- John Carmichael (born 1930)
- Malcolm Williamson (1931–2003)
- Betty Beath (born 1932)
- Michael Brimer (1933–2023)
- Colin Brumby (1933–2018)
- Don Kay (born 1933)
- Larry Sitsky (born 1934)
- Ann Carr-Boyd (born 1938)
- Philip Bračanin (born 1942)
- Ross Edwards (born 1943)
- Barry Conyngham (born 1944)
- George Palmer (born 1947)
- Brenton Broadstock (born 1952)
- Carl Vine (born 1954)
- Andrew Ford (born 1957)
- Elena Kats-Chernin (born 1957)
- Nigel Westlake (born 1958)
- Andrew Schultz (born 1960)
- Brett Dean (born 1961)
- Mary Finsterer (born 1962)
- Deborah Cheetham (born 1964)
- Georges Lentz (born 1965)
- Constantine Koukias (born 1965)
- Liza Lim (born 1966)
- Katia Tiutiunnik (born 1967)
- David Banney (born 1968)
- Damien Ricketson (born 1973)
- Julian Cochran (born 1974)
- Nicholas Vines (born 1976)
- Michael Sollis (born 1985)

== See also ==
- List of Australian composers
- List of Australian women composers
