= List of Australian women composers =

This is a list of Australian women composers of classical music, contemporary music and/or film soundtracks.

== A ==
- Tina Arena (born 1967)
- Ella Airlie (1882–1959)

== B ==
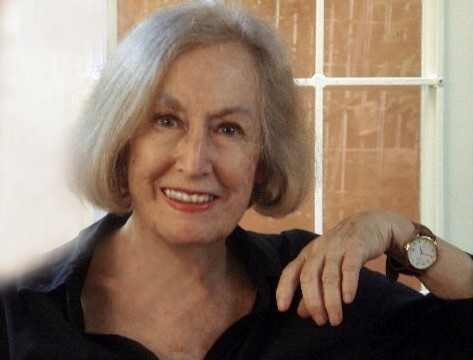
Betty Beath

- Betty Beath (born 1932)
- Una Mabel Bourne (1882–1974)
- Anne Boyd (born 1946)
- May Brahe (née Mary Dickson 1884–1956)
- Amanda Brown (born 1965)
- Vera Buck (1903–1986)

== C ==
- Ann Carr-Boyd (born 1938)
- Charlie Chan (born 1966)
- Alice Charbonnet-Kellermann (1858–1914)
- Deborah Cheetham Fraillon (born 1964)
- Judith Clingan (born 1945)
- Kate Crawford (born 1974)
- Leah Curtis

== D ==
- Ruby Claudia Davy (1883–1949)
- Catherine Duc
- Melissa Dunphy (born 1980)

== E ==
- Sandy Evans (born 1960)
- Winsome Evans (born 1941)
- Florence Maude Ewart (1864–1949)

== F ==
- Mary Finsterer (born 1962)
- Samantha Fonti (born 1973)
- Jennifer Fowler (born 1939)

== G ==
- Lisa Gerrard (born 1961)
- Brenda Gifford (born 1968)
- Helen Gifford (born 1935)
- Peggy Glanville-Hicks (1912–1990)
- Sally Greenaway (born 1984)
- Maria Grenfell (born 1969)

== H ==
- Edith Harrhy (1893–1969)
- Fiona Joy Hawkins (born 1964)
- Moya Henderson (born 1941)
- Mirrie Hill (1892–1968)
- Dulcie Holland (1913–2000)
- Miriam Hyde (1913–2005)

== I ==
- Dami Im (born 1988)

== K ==
- Letty Katts (1919–2007)
- Elena Kats-Chernin (born 1957)
- Linda Kouvaras (born 1960)

== L ==
- Liza Lim (born 1966)

== M ==
- Mona McBurney (1862–1932)
- Kathleen McGuire (born 1965)
- Mary Mageau (1934–2020)
- Varney Monk (1892–1967)
- Kate Moore (born 1979)

== P ==
- Katharine "Kitty" Parker (1886–1971)
- Linda Phillips (1899–2002)

== R ==
- Esther Rofe (1904–2000)

== S ==
- Ariel Shearer (c. 1905–unknown)
- Margaret Sutherland (1897–1984)
- May Summerbelle (1867–1947)
- Nardi Simpson (born 1975)

== T ==
- Penelope Thwaites (born 1944)
- Katia Tiutiunnik (born 1967)

== W ==
- Gillian Whitehead (born 1941)
- Emmeline M. D. Woolley (1843–1908)
- Sally Whitwell (born 1974)

== Y ==
- Yunyu

== See also ==
- List of Australian composers
