= Caglioti =

Caglioti is a surname. Notable people with the surname include:

- Giuseppe Caglioti (1931–2024), Italian physicist
- Vincenzo Caglioti (1902–1998), Italian chemist
