= William Sexton =

William Sexton may refer to:

- William Sexton (politician) (1819–1895), Ontario farmer, auctioneer and political figure
- William Sexton (organist) (1764–1824), English organist
- William T. Sexton (1901–1983), United States Army officer
