= Herbert Hedwan Chandler =

Australian composer

Herbert Hedwan-Chandler
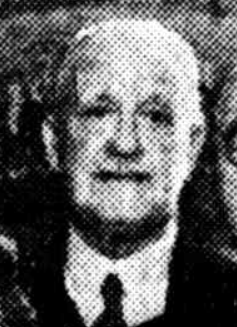

Background information
- Born: 1 January 1865; Weston-super-Mare, Somerset, England
- Died: 21 August 1941 (aged 73–74)
- Occupations: Composer, Organist, Music Teacher
- Instruments: Vocals, Keyboard
- Years active: 1890-1910

Marie Gavotte 1877 by Herbert Hedwan Chandler
MIDI version

Herbert Hadwen-Chandler (1 January 1865, Wandsworth, London – 21 August 1941, Claremont, Perth, Australia) was an Australian organist, teacher and composer of light romantic works. He was respected as a musician and well connected in Perth society. He worked at Nicholson's Music publisher in Fremantle and Perth. He toured Australian cities as a vocalist.

== Performances ==
Chandler played organ recitals including Handel's 'Messiah' in 1923. He was an active member of the Perth metro Gleemen and Perth Philharmonic society.

== Personal ==
His only son Lance-Corporal Roy Chandler was wounded at Gallipoli and died shortly after of complications.

== Works ==
- 1897 Fairy Bowers
- 1906 Song of the gun (verse by Frances Allitsen)
- 1887 Pandora March
- 1909 Marie Gavotte
- 1907 Nearing Home
- 1901 Summer Time (Vocal Motet)
- 1899 Clarion March

Make a Joyful Noise
