= Alan Rattray =

Allan M Rattray
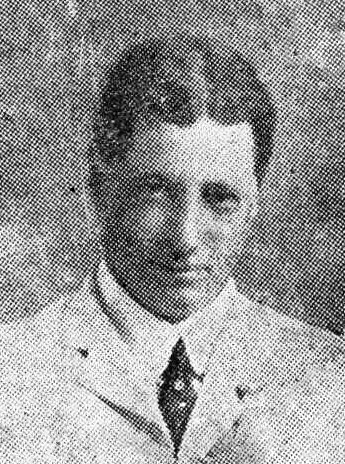
- Alan McKenzie Rattray

Background information
- Born: 1 January 1878; Sydney, Australia
- Died: 26 June 1919 (aged 53)
- Occupations: Composer, lyricist
- Years active: 1899–1910

Alan MacKenzie Rattray was a lyricist, composer and arranger of music. Born in Concord, Sydney in 1878, Rattray was the son of pioneer capitalists George Allan and Catherine (Beames) Rattray.

Rattray was a prolific lyricist and arranger, often collaborating with fellow Australian composers Edward Henry Tyrrell and Louis L. Howarde. Rattray is best known for the song "Boy in the Sailor Cap", which was the subject of a copyright claim.

He survived a shipwreck while on tour to India. Rattray was critical of Australian war time rationing, writing poetical polemics in the papers of the time.

He died of pneumonic influenza at a temporary emergency hospital within the grounds of the Royal Agricultural Society in Moore Park, Sydney during the 1919 Spanish Flu pandemic.

== Works ==
- Boy in the Sailor Cap
- The Old Gum Tree performed most famously by Marie Eaton.
- On the Briny
- Jack Tar
- 1908 Pansy Leaf
- Somebody's Sweetheart
- My Black Canary
- She's somebody's sweetheart still – words by Alan M. Rattray; the music by Alan M. Rattray & Clarence Vaughan
- Oh! Angeline! – written by Alan M. Rattray; music by Clarence Vaughan
- What would be a paradise to me – words by Alan M. Rattray; music by Alan M. Rattray and Clarence Vaughan
- Where the moonbeams bathe the fields in silver light – words by Alan M. Rattray; music by Clarence Vaughan
- Comic song: I'm not a long way off – written by Alan M. Rattray; composed by A.M.R., Clarence Vaughan
- We only live just to love – words by Alan M. Rattray; music by Clarence Vaughan
- A girl of the very best – music by Alan Rattray & Clarence Vaughan
- My heart keeps ever calling for her, still – words by Alan M. Rattray; music by Alan M. Rattray
- The girl in the Strand – words by Alan M. Rattray; music by Clarence Vaughan
- Sneezing song: Ah-h-did-did-did-ah-kshoo!!! – words by Alan M. Rattray; music by Clarence Vaughan
- Only a little boy – words by Alan M. Rattray; music by Clarence Vaughan
- My maid of Tyrol – words by Alan M. Rattray; music by AMR & Clarence Vaughan
- Suzanne! – words by Alan M. Rattray; music by Clarence Vaughan
- When my sweetheart answered yes – words by Alan M. Rattray; music by AMR & Clarence Vaughan
- Comic song: Joints – written by Alan M. Rattray; music by Clarence Vaughan
- Comic song: Kickin' up a fuss like that! – written by Alan M. Rattray; composed by Clarence Vaughan
- The idol of Cassidy's ball – words by Alan M. Rattray; arranged by Clarence Vaughan
- Sister! – words by Alan M. Rattray; music by Clarence Vaughan
- Then he began to think – words by Aln M. Rattray; music by Clarence Vaughan
- My first and only love – words by Alan M. Rattray; arranged by Clarence Vaughan
- I wonder what they mean by that – words by Alan M. Rattray; music by AMR & Clarence Vaughan
- That's French! – words by Alan Rattray; music by Clarence Vaughan
- My Sunday boy – words by Alan M. Rattray; music by A.M.R. & Clarence Vaughan
- Comic duet: Think o' that! – words by Alan M. Rattray; music by Benj. H. Burt
- The way they love – written and composed by Alan M. Rattray; arranged by Louis L. Howarde
- Miss Penelope – words by Alan M. Rattray; music by Clarence Vaughan
- If your love were real – words and music by Alan M. Rattray; arranged by Louis L. Howarde
- Comic song: What a pity – written and composed by Alan M. Rattray; arranged by L. L. Howarde
- Love in all
- What does it matter when two – Alan M. Rattray & Clarence Vaughan
- Little Grey Eyes – words and music by Alan M. Rattray; arranged by L. L. Howarde
- I'm so tired of waiting for you – words and music by Alan M. Rattray; arranged by L. L. Howarde
- Laughing answers – written by Alan M. Rattray; composed & arranged by Alan M. Rattray & L. L. Howarde
- Lavinia : schottische – composed by Alan M. Rattray.
- Dear old dad – words and music by Alan M. Rattray; arranged by L.L. Howarde
- Ambolene, ma Kaffir queen – words & music by Alan M. Rattray
- Coster song: Sal – words and music by Alan M. Rattray; arranged by Louis L. Howarde
- The boy in the sailor cap – words and music by Alan M. Rattray; arranged by Louis L. Howarde
- Mabel – words and music by Alan M. Rattray; arranged by Louis L. Howarde
- I'm such a tomboy – words and music by Alan M. Rattray; (arr. by Louis L. Howarde)
- Eily – words and music by Alan M. Rattray (arranged by Louis L. Howarde)
- Schottische – Comic song: I don't care – written and composed by Alan M. Rattray; arranged by L.L. Howarde
- Jack Tar – words and music by Alan M. Rattray; arranged by Louis L. Howarde
- Gymnastic scena: The girls from Sandow's school – written by Alan M. Rattray; composed by Alan M. Rattray and Lou. L. Howarde
- False as accused – written and composed by Alan Rattray & Tom Donnelly
- It only makes me love you more and more – words and music by Alan M. Rattray

== Recordings ==
- 1905: "Sister"
