= Paul Doornbusch =

Australian composer and musician

Paul Doornbusch (born 1959, Melbourne) is an Australian composer and musician. He is the author of a book documenting the first computer music, made with the CSIRAC.

Doornbusch spent several years at RMIT University in Melbourne, and later taught at the New Zealand School of Music. He now lives in the Melbourne area.

Doornbusch is known for researching the origins of computer music in Australia and has written a book on the subject. The book was reviewed by James Harley in Computer Music Journal in Fall 2006. Harley's review recognized Doornbusch as having "dedication", "thoroughness", "determination", and being "admirable". It also called The Music of CSIRAC "an important, crucial addition to the body of references documenting our field."

The biography accompanying his Corrosion CD states that "his compositional concerns involve new forms for music appropriate for contemporary culture.... He works mostly as an algorithmic composer, but occasionally in recent years he has engaged in peripheral areas such as the Place-Hampi project with Jeffrey Shaw. As an algorithmic composer, Doornbusch has identified and examined in detail the mapping stage of the process where structural data becomes musical parameters." Corrosion was reviewed by Richard Barrett in Computer Music Journal in Fall 2006. His review stated that "There are not so many composers at work, even in the 21st century [...] whose commitment to the technical possibilities afforded by contemporary technology is so closely matched by a compulsion to exploit to the full the expressive potential unleashed thereby."

== Recordings ==
- Corrosion CD of the works of Paul Doornbusch, 2002 (EMF 043)
- The Frog Peak Collaboration Project 1998 (USA)

== List of works ==
- Continuity 1W (2007), electronics.
- Lorenz (2005), piano.
- Continuity3 (2000), percussion and electronics.
- Continuity 2 (1999), bass recorder quartet and electronics.
- Dialogus (2000), electronics.
- ACT 5 (1998), for amplified bassoon and hanging percussion.
- G4 (1997), for electronics.
- MFPG (1994), for electronics.
- Strepidus Somnus (1997), for 4 voices and electronics.
- Assifxiation (1997) amplified flute and electronics.
- On The Fence (1997) for medium ensemble and electronics.
- Structured Luck (1996), for amplified bassoon and electronics.
- Iceberg (1995) for electronics.
- Preludes (1994) for 4 voices.
- M1 (1995) for soloist and electronics.
- M2 (1995) for soloist and electronics.

== Books ==
- Doornbusch, Paul (2005). The Music of CSIRAC, Australia's first computer music. Common Ground. ISBN 1-86335-569-3.
