= Magic Gum Tree =

1932 musical comedy

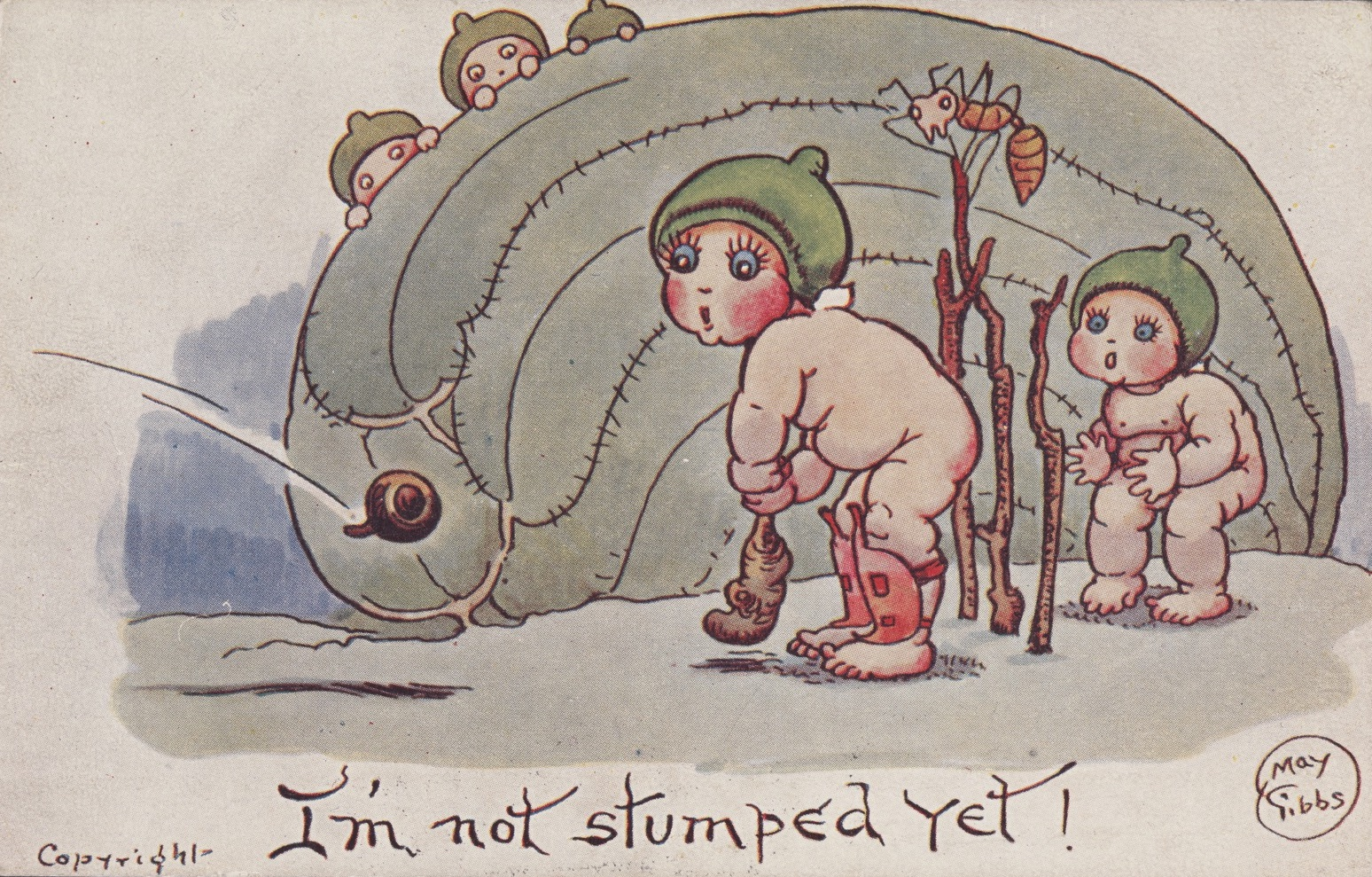
Gumnut Pixies. by May Gibbs Another example of Nursery Australiana

The Magic Gum Tree is a musical comedy written in 1932 with music and lyrics by Australian composer Arline Sauer.

The story involves an immigrant girl lost in the Australian outback who falls asleep and meets several dreamland characters. She is rescued by a group of Australian Aboriginal boys and returned safely home. The piece is a work of Australiana featuring Australian animals and characters. A Queensland reviewer thought it reminiscent of A. A. Milne.

== Musical numbers ==
- Overture
- Ten Little Aboriginals
- Gumnut Pixies (dance)
- Dear Little Wattle Blossom
- Ko-a-la
- Hail! Thou Fair Land (duet)
- Ten Little Aboriginals (Finale)

== Productions ==
- 1934 Railway Institute, Sydney
- 1935 Melbourne
- 1935 Clermont, New South Wales
- 1935 Newcastle, New South Wales
- 1935 Lismore, New South Wales
- 1935 Parkside, South Australia
- 1936 Wayville, South Australia (selections)
- 1937 Trangie, New South Wales
- 1937 St George, Queensland
- 1937 Coffs Harbour
- 1937 Armidale, New South Wales
- 1938 Bundarra, New South Wales
- 1938 Maitland, New South Wales
- 1939 Hobart, Tasmania
- 1939 Canberra, ACT
- 1940 Wellington, New South Wales
- 1940 Carnarvon, Western Australia
- 1941 Cairns, Queensland
- 1941 Mount Barker, South Australia
- 1941 Newcastle, New South Wales
- 1942 Manilla, New South Wales
- 1942 Mudgee, New South Wales
- 1942 Rockhampton, New South Wales
- 1946 Burnie, Tasmania
- 1947 Forbes, New South Wales
- 1950 Pinnaroo, South Australia

== Carl and Arline Sauer ==
Carl Sauer D. Mus., F.S.Sc.A. (died 5 March 1951) was a German-born musician, teacher and composer in Australia, founder of the N.S.W. Youth Symphony Orchestra and Choir.

Arline Estelle Lower (died 1990) was an Adelaide pianist who, at around 16 years of age, achieved considerable success at the Easter 1912 competitions in Launceston. She joined Sauer's concert party sometime around 1915 and married him in May 1924 and became generally known as Arline Sauer the following month. They divorced in 1946 and the following year, as Arline Lower, acted as soloist and accompanist to Rosina Raisbeck on the mezzo-soprano's tour of Australia and New Zealand. She continued to find favor as an accompanist in Sydney: for soprano Eleanor Houston, contralto Florence Taylor, tenor John Dudley, and baritone John Cameron. at the 1948 Carols by Candlelight, and in 1949 for baritone Donald Graham and Betty Kable, the New Zealand violinist.

Other works include:

- Pixie-land (c. 1932): three songs for medium voice by Arline Lower

1. Pixie pipers
2. Pixie revels
3. Lullaby

Lower was active in promoting cross-cultural exchanges, founding president of the New Australians' Cultural Association, and founder of the Arline Lower Art Prize of 100 guineas.
