= William Stanley (composer) =

English-born Australian classical music composer

William Stanley (1820–1902) was an English-born Australian classical music composer, conductor and performer.

Bay View Gavotte 1893 by William Stanley
MIDI version

== Early life ==
Stanley was born in Egham, near Windsor, England, the son of William Sexton and Ann Stanley. Sexton, who was the organist at St George's Chapel, Windsor Castle (1801–1824), married Ann in 1819. After Sexton's death, Ann married William Best (1803–1880) in 1827. Best was an oboist or trumpeter with the King's Band (under the control of the Master of the King's Musick). Ann died on 14 May 1828, one month after giving birth to Stanley's half-sister, Emma. This left Stanley and two younger sisters in Best's care.

Stanley, under the name of Sexton, was a member of the choir of St George's Chapel, and is said to have sung at the funeral of King George IV there in 1830. Recognised as a musical prodigy at an early age (he could play complex compositions on the piano at sight), his step-father provided some instruction but, having a large family to support, could not afford the training Stanley required. By the age of 9 he composed a series of variations on "God Save the King".

His step-father's connections with the Royal Household no doubt got him the opportunity to perform his own compositions before Queen Adelaide.

In 1836, under his mother's name Stanley, he joined the 80th Regiment of Foot, which was given the duty of escorting convict transports to Australia and he arrived in Sydney in 1837. He was discharged from the Regiment in 1840.

== Australian career ==
His first performance in Australia opened the Royal Victoria Theatre, Sydney. Another of Stanley's earliest piano performances in Sydney was at the Royal Hotel on 17 October 1838. A concerto by Henri Herz showed him "at once to be a master of this instrument". He accompanied many visiting performers, including Sara Flower, Miska Hauser, and Anna Bishop.

He was a church organist at a number of Sydney Anglican churches, including St John's, Parramatta, St Andrew's pro-cathedral, St Barnabas, Broadway, and Christ Church St Laurence (1870–1882).

A trusted teacher, Stanley was instrumental in forming a musical society west of Sydney. At the time of his death, he was said to be Australia's oldest pianist. He also conducted a Brass Band.

Stanley's Rose Bay Quadrilles were arranged for guitar duet by Peter Sculthorpe

== Works ==
- 1850 Tell Him I love him yet
- The Sydney Polka (1851)
- Rose Bay Quadrilles
- 1863 The NSW Volunteer Rifles Quick March
- 1863 Heliotrope Mazurka
- 1879 Sydney international exhibition grand march
- 1893 Bay View Gavotte

== Recordings ==
- Rose Bay Quadrilles
