= William Sexton (organist) =

English organist

William Sexton (1764–1824), was an English organist.

He was a chorister of St George's Chapel at Windsor Castle and in Eton College.

He was assistant organist for some years until he was appointed at St George's Chapel at Windsor Castle in 1801, a position he held until his death in 1824.

William Stanley (1820–1902), Sexton’s son by his second wife, Ann Stanley, became an organist and composer in Sydney, Australia.
