= Mirrie Hill =

Australian composer (1889–1986)

Mirrie Hill OBE
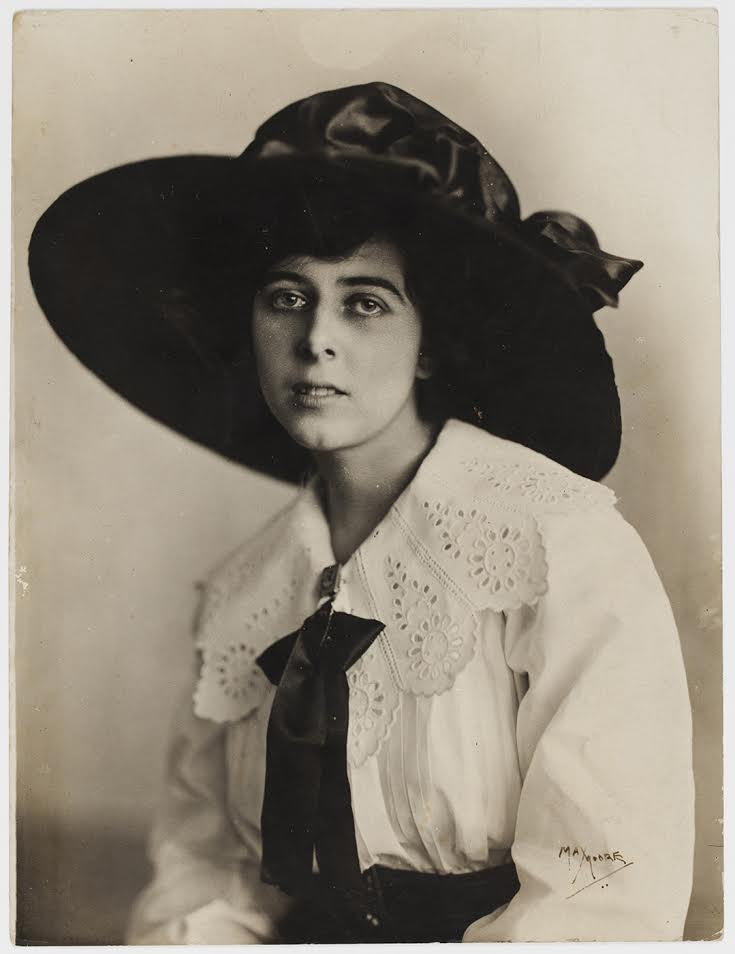
- Born: 1 December 1889; Randwick, New South Wales, Australia
- Died: 1 May 1986 (aged 96); St Leonards, New South Wales
- Occupation: Composer
- Spouse: Alfred Hill (m. 1921–1960)

Mirrie Irma Hill (née Solomon) OBE (1 December 1889 – 1 May 1986) was an Australian composer.

== Early life ==
Mirrie Irma Jaffa Hill was born on 1 December 1889 in the Sydney suburb of Randwick. She was the youngest of three, born to Levien Jaffa Solomon and Kate Caroline. She had a good ear early on, detecting dissonance and running out of the room whenever her aunt would play Mendelssohn's Songs Without Words. She studied composition with Alfred Hill, who would later become her husband, at Shirley School, Edgecliff.

With Alfred Hill as conductor, Godfrey Smith and the Sydney Amateur Orchestral Society performed Mirrie Hill's first orchestral work, Rhapsody for Piano and Orchestra, in 1914 at the Sydney Town Hall. She was unable to study in Germany because of World War I, so she instead went to the New South Wales State Conservatorium of Music, where she was awarded a scholarship by the director, Henri Verbrugghen.

== Career ==
After finishing her schooling at the Conservatorium in 1918, Hill was made assistant-professor of harmony, counterpoint and composition there. After retiring from the Conservatorium in 1944, Hill worked as an examiner for the Australian Music Examinations Board from 1959 to 1966. Hill's exploration into music inspired by the indigenous peoples of Australia started when anthropologist Charles P. Mountford asked her to compose the score for the film he was making about Aboriginal life. For inspiration, Mountford gave Hill recordings he had made of performances of indigenous Australian songs. Hill drew from these recordings for both her suite Three Aboriginal Dances and Arnhem Land Symphony. Although the indigenous songs influenced Hill's Symphony, she has explained that the symphony was not meant to be specifically Aboriginal in its make-up.

Mirrie Hill described her own music as "not [in] the very modern idiom but entirely individual as to style and content." She composed in many different genres, but her favourite was classical orchestral music. She created over five hundred pieces, ranging from chamber music and film scores to elementary works for children. Although she did create many longer pieces of music for orchestra and ensembles, Hill became known as a miniaturist because a great deal of her published works were short.

== Personal life ==
In 1921, she married her previous teacher, Alfred Hill, who had three children from a previous marriage. She never had any children of her own. They were married in the Sydney suburb of Mosman, and built a home there, where they lived for most of their lives. Due to the fact that Alfred Hill was such a recognized composer, Mirrie Hill's work was often overlooked. She was described by the people around her as a shy and happy person; she put her husband's career before her own for most of her life. She received greater recognition for her works after her husband's death. In 1975 she was made a life member of the Fellowship of Australian Composers and in 1980 was appointed an OBE (Officer of the Most Excellent Order of the British Empire).

== Works (incomplete list) ==
Hill composed pieces for orchestra and chamber ensembles, as well as choral pieces, film scores, songs and solo instrumental works. She often incorporated Aboriginal themes and traditional Jewish melodies.

- 4 songs for voice and string quartet: Grace for a child, God be in my head, In spite of all, Caprice
- Abinu Malkenu – duo for violin and piano, & orchestral version
- All In a Day (1950)
- An Autumn Day – words by
- And every one will love me
- Arnhem Land symphony (1954)
- Bell Birds (1952)
- Bourrée
- Caprice
- Child Fantasies (1935)
- Come Summer (1969)
- Dance of the Cunning Mouse (1973)
- The Dancing Fawn (1969)
- Dancing Feet (1950)
- Dreams (1942)
- For Hire (1949)
- Garden Sketches (1934)
- Grace for a child
- Kindergarten Songs – words by Judy Brown (1946)
- The Leafy Lanes of Kent (1950)
- Let your song be delicate
- Lost- my little black puppy: he scampers away (1949)
- March of a Robot (1973)
- Meditation (1954)
- Merry Imp (1976)
- Mr. Roo (1948)
- My Bird Sings (1973)
- My little dove
- Old Mr Sundown in Fairyland [children's musical theatre] – words by Leila Pirani (1935)
- Our Land: 2 part – words by Mary Gilmore (1955)
- Pan plucked a reed
- Party Tunes (1957)
- Pierrette! Pierrot! – words by Olive Ingall (1957)
- Pipe Reel (1970)
- Rhapsody for Piano and Orchestra (1914)
- Sarabande
- Seven Australian Songs [1. Rain—2. The wallaby rat—3. The platypus—4. The train with the forty trucks—5. Little brother possum—6. Tinkle, tinkle cow bells—7. Gum trees] – words by Jane de Burgh (1925)
- The solitary
- Three Aboriginal Dances (Brolga, The Kunkarankara Women, Nalda of the Echo) (1950)
- Three Highland Tunes (1971)
- Three Miniature Pieces for the Piano
- Three Nice Mice (1970)
- Waltz (1942)
- Willow Wind (1973)
- You Are There – words by Mary Gilmore (ca.1944)

== Recordings ==
Her works have been recorded and issued on CD, including:

- Dance of the Wild Men: Early Twentieth Century Australian Piano Music, Tamara Anna Cislowska (piano) Artworks

== See also ==
- Alfred Hill (composer)
- List of Australian women composers

== Further reading and listening ==
- "Hill family - papers, music and pictorial material of Alfred Hill and Mirrie Hill, 1854-1984". Manuscripts and Pictures Catalogue, State Library of NSW.
- Australian Music Centre, CD sample player: Dance of the wild men : early 20th century Australian piano music / Tamara Anna Cislowska
- Australian Music Centre, Resonate magazine: "Composing against the tide" by Jeanell Carrigan (2017)
