= Stephen Hale Marsh =

English educator (1808–1888)

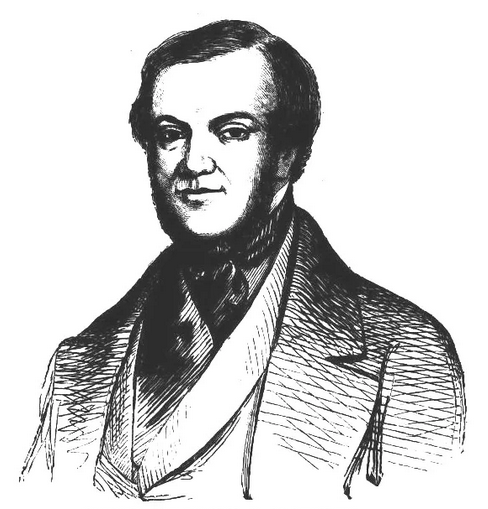
- Portrait of Marsh

Background information
- Born: January 4, 1808; United Kingdom
- Died: January 21, 1888 (aged 83)
- Occupations: Composer, conductor, teacher, harpist
- Instrument: Harp
- Years active: 1842-1872

Stephen Hale Marsh (1808-1888) was born in the United Kingdom and lived in other countries, including Japan, but thirty productive years of his career were spent in Australia. He gave popular lectures on music. He was fondly regarded as a pioneer of music. He taught singing in Sydney, where he was said to have raised the expectations of audiences. Although he was initially an ally of fellow composer Isaac Nathan, he later became a rival.

Marsh took part in the inauguration of the Victorian Academy of Music. Marsh wore his beard in the chin-strap style. He played and wrote music for the harp.

== Works ==
- 1824 There's a magic in thine eye, love
- 1841 Leichhardt's Return
- 1845 Australian Waltz
- 1846 Leichhardt's march
- 1851 Ferrolana Polka Opus 63
- 1854 'By Murray's Banks' - setting of bush poem by 'Ignotus' or 'Evelyn'
- 1854 Liechhardt March
- 1854 Bathurst March
- 1855 Brilliant fantasia
- 1856 Far O'er the Sea
- 1856 Allan McGan
- 1859 In Thee Oh Lord Do I Put My Trust
- 1862 (arrangeur) 'Le Bon Voyage'
- 1865 'The Stockman's last bed' setting of lines published as early as 1857
- 1872 Illustrations of Pipelӗ
- Advance Australia
- Fair Australia Waltzes
- Hail to Victoria! Queen of the ocean
- Australian Polka
- Gentleman in Black (Opera)
- 1896 (posthumous) Song of the Aeroplane: The Flying Machine
- Japan Waltz
- Churan Waltz
- Homebush Galop

== Recordings ==
- All England Eleven Polka
