= David Banney =

Australian conductor

David Banney (born 1968, Brisbane, Australia) is an Australian conductor, composer and music educator. He is involved with various organisations and ensembles, including the Christ Church Cathedral, the Newcastle Music Festival, the Christ Church Camerata, and the Newcastle Cathedral College of Music. Banney is also an Honorary Senior Lecturer at the University of Newcastle, Australia.

== Career ==
=== Music ===
Banney is the director of music at Christ Church Cathedral, Newcastle, and the conductor of the Christ Church Camerata. He is the artistic director of the Newcastle Music Festival. Banney has conducted various ensembles in Australia, including the Queensland Symphony Orchestra, Canberra Symphony Orchestra, Opera Queensland, Queensland Ballet, Adelaide Symphony Orchestra, and the West Australian Symphony Orchestra. He has worked extensively with youth orchestras, including the Queensland Youth Orchestras, the European Medical Students Orchestras, the Sydney Youth Philharmonic, and the Newcastle Strings Orchestra. As a composer, Banney has written for orchestra, chamber ensembles, and choirs.

=== Symmetry ===
In 2015, Banney completed a PhD thesis entitled Symmetry and Symmetry Reduction in Music. He has collaborated with other scholars for research, publishing with Giuseppe Caglioti on the subject of thermodynamics in music, and with Roger Smith on the subject of symmetry breaking in the synchronisation of uterine muscle behaviour during human labour. In 2018, Banney was appointed an Honorary Senior Lecturer at the University of Newcastle, where he taught the course "Einstein, Bach and the Taj Mahal: Symmetry in the Arts, Sciences and Humanities".

== Awards ==
- Winner of the ABC Young Conductor of the Year Award (1995)
