= Frederick Ellard =

Australian composer

Frederick Ellard (1824–1874) was an Australian classical music composer. Visiting Hungarian composer Miska Hauser was sufficiently impressed to dedicate an Australian publication in Ellard's honour.

== Works ==
- 1842 Sydney Corporation Quadrilles
- 1846 I think of thee
- 1850 Hayes Quadrille
- 1854 Australian Bird Waltz
- 1854 Morceau de salon : sur Lucrʹece
- 1855 Crimea

== Recordings ==
- Great Britain Polka
- Australian Ladies- National Country Dances
- Sydney Railroad Galop
- Australian Quadrilles
- I think of Thee
