= Ernest Edwin Mitchell =

Australian musician (1865–1951)

- Born: 16 January 1865; Port Adelaide, South Australia
- Died: 10 December 1951 (aged 86) Payneham South, South Australia
- Genres: Liturgical
- Occupations: Composer, conductor, teacher
- Instruments: Organ; keyboard
- Years active: 1895–1937
- Education: University of Adelaide
- Spouse: Amy Bertha Edmeades (m. 1885)
- Children: 3

Ernest Edwin Mitchell (16 January 1865 – 10 December 1951) was an Australian composer, conductor, music lecturer and organist.

== Career ==
Mitchell was born on 16 January 1865, in Port Adelaide, South Australia, when his father, Thomas James Mitchell, was 43 and his mother, Thurza Lucy Cole, was 36. He married Amy Bertha Edmeades on 27 July 1885. He died on 10 December 1951, in Payneham South, South Australia, at the age of 86, and was buried in Payneham Cemetery, Payneham, South Australia, Australia. They had three children Lillian Bertha Mitchell 1886–1974, Kathleen Lois Mitchell 1895–1972 and Alan Rodney Clemhilt Mitchell 1904–1983.

Mitchell graduated from the University of Adelaide with a Bachelor of Music and was granted honours in second year. He played keyboards and organ. Mitchell was a devout member of the Uniting Church with passionate feelings about music particularly the standard of teaching. So keen on quality services, he allowed his musical works to be distributed by newspaper.

Mitchell was secretary of the South Australia Music Teachers' Society. He was active in music teaching for at least sixteen years.

Australian composer Ruby Claudia Davy was a pupil.

== Notable works ==
"In His Presence" (1902) by Mitchell
MIDI version

Mitchell's notable works include:

- 1902 Eolus
- This Land We Love the Best
- Lovely Voices of the Sky – Christmas Carol
- The Princes Men
- Two Sacred Songs
- Break Break Break
- Oh Taste and See
- 1913 Tomorrow
- 1920 My Lady Sleeps – an SATB setting of "Serenade" by Longfellow
