= Samantha Fonti =

Australian film composer and classically trained violinist

Samantha Fonti (born 12 February 1973) is an Australian film composer and classically trained violinist.

== Life ==
Fonti was raised and born in Sydney. She started her classical music training at the age of three and completed her Bachelor of Music degree as a violin major at the Sydney Conservatorium of Music in 2000. She then attended the Australian Film, Television and Radio School (AFTRS) graduate screen composition course in Sydney.

She was nominated for Best Original Score for the short film Moving Day at the St Kilda International Film Festival 2011 and was a finalist for APRA's Professional Development Awards in 2009.

Her feature films credits include composing the score for Brush, The 7th Hunt, which screened at the New York City Horror Film Festival in 2008, and You Can't Stop the Murders as additional score composer.

Currently signed to Perfect Pitch Publishing as a commissioned composer, she has worked on television series for Endemol Southern Star and Cordell Jigsaw including Big Brother Australia (2008), Download (2008), Friday Night Live (2008), Gladiators, Battlefronts, Bondi Rescue Bali, Bondi Rescue, Kenny's World, ABC's Message Stick, Black Olive and Burke's Backyard.

She has worked on several ABC documentaries including Boxing for Palm Island, Desperate Times, Desperate Measures and Sisters in the Black Movement and Channel 7's Hardliners. She has scored many television commercials including Mercedes Venger, Sony, Nurofen, St Vinnies Christmas Appeal, Volvo, Asthma Foundation, Friends of the Earth and Soothers.

She has scored over 20 short films including Dark Horse (winner for Best Short at Byron Bay International Film Festival), Spoonman (winner of Flickerfest 2003), ABC's The Farm, and Death's Requiem (winning awards at 2007 Method Fest in Los Angeles, St Kilda Film Festival, 2007 Shriekfest Los Angeles International Horror and Sci-Fi Film Festival, Big Island Film Festival (Hawaii), Swansea Bay Film Festival (Wales) & Staten Island Film Festival). Other shorts include Wrong Answer, winner of the 2005 Frankly Film Festival and 2007 Red Rock Film Festival.

As a performer she is most known as the violinist from Vicious Hairy Mary and as a session player and string arranger including Silverchair, Wendy Matthews, The Whitlams, Caligula, Def FX, Vicious Hairy Mary, Primary and Circus Monoxide.

She has toured nationally and internationally throughout Europe and Asia and at various festivals and events including the Commonwealth Games (2006), Big Day Out, Falls Festival, Byron Bay Arts and Music Festival, Peats Ridge Festival and Tamworth Country Music Festival.

== Screen credits ==
=== Feature films ===
Brush (2011), The 7th Hunt (2008), (Miramax) You Cant Stop the Murders (2002)

=== Advertising ===
Venger (2011) Nurofen Zavance (2009), Australian Geographic (2009), St Vinnies Christmas Appeal - Clemengers BBDO (2007), Volvo Cars - Chase (2007), Asthma Foundation - Escape (2007), The Heat is On - Friends of the Earth (2006)& Soothers theme song (2004)

=== Series ===
City Chic (2011), Big Brother 2008 (commissioned composer), Battlefronts (2008 - commissioned composer), Gladiators (2008 - commissioned composer), Download (2008 - commissioned composer), Bondi Rescue Bali (2008 - commissioned composer), Black Olive (2003 - commissioned composer), Burke's Backyard -'Tropical Tree Make Over' (2002 - commissioned composer)

=== Documentaries ===
(ABC) Boxing for Palm Island (2010), (ABC) Sisters in the Black Movement(2002) & (ABC) Desperate Times, Desperate Measures (2002)

=== Short films ===
Dark Horse (2009), Daysleeper (2009), The Farm (2009), Best Enemies (2009), Deaths Requiem (2007), Wrong Answer (2005), Control (2005), Pookie (2004), Language of Love (2004), Rendezvous (2003), Spoonman (2002), Echoes in the Mountains (2002)

=== Other media ===
ABC Message Stick compilation album(2002), Book - Post Me to the Prime Minister (2004), Mokal Music Sound Libraries (2001), Soundtrax Sound Libraries (2000/1)

=== Arranging and recording ===
Commonwealth Games 2006- Fly By Night, Circus Monoxide - Crash and Burn (2005), Tracy Redhead (2004 & 2008), Darren Hanlon (2002 - Hello Stranger album), Silverchair (2000 -Neon Ballroom), The Whitlams (1999 -'Melbourne), Wendy Matthews (1999 & 2000), Vicious Hairy Mary (1999 - Orchestra Phantasma), Primary (1998 & 2000), Robyn Loau (1998 - Love Addiction), Eva Trout (1997 - album), Def FX (1997 - Majick), Caligula (1996 - Rubanesque), Karma Zoo (1995 - Karma Zoo), Godstar (1994 - Godstar), Beathaven (1991, 1992 & 1993 - album & singles)
