= Ruby Claudia Davy =

Australian musician and composer

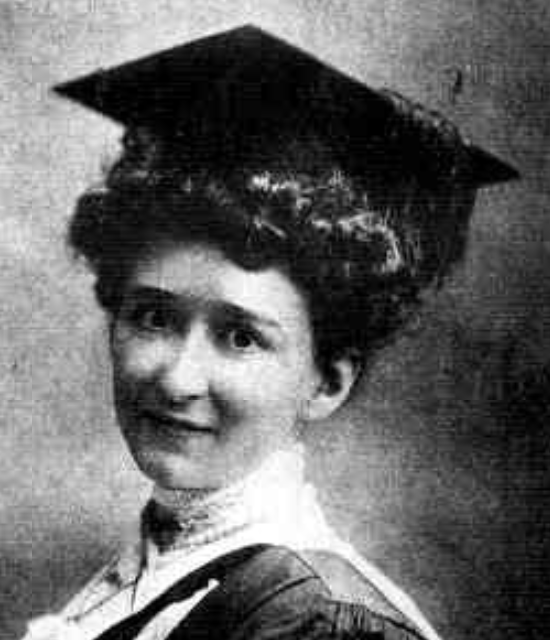

Background information
- Born: 22 November 1883; Salisbury, South Australia
- Died: 12 July 1949 (aged 65) Melbourne, Australia
- Occupations: composer, musician and educator
- Instruments: piano

Ruby Claudia Emily Davy (22 November 1883 – 12 July 1949) was an Australian pianist, composer and educator. She was the first woman in Australia to receive a DMus degree.

The daughter of William Charles Davy, a shoemaker and musician, and Louisa Jane Litchfield, a singer and music teacher, she was born in Salisbury, South Australia. Davy received a BMus and MMus from the Elder Conservatorium of Music. She also earned a diploma in elocution from the London College of Music. She became a fellow of Trinity College London in 1921, the first woman outside of Britain to receive that honour.

She was composing short musical pieces at the age of seven, and by nine, she had already written a cantata. She soon established the Salisbury School of Music and began assisting her mother with teaching.

In 1912, she taught theory and counterpoint as a temporary replacement at the Conservatorium. She moved to Prospect with her parents in 1920; Davy and her mother taught music there. After her parents died in 1929, she suffered a nervous breakdown and abandoned music and teaching for four years.

She moved to Melbourne in 1934. In the same year, she began giving lecture recitals on the radio and to various organisations there. She toured England, Europe, Canada and the United States in 1939. In 1941, she founded the Society of Women Musicians of Australia.

She composed Australia Fair And Free for voices and orchestra, which was performed in 1936 in Adelaide.

Davy underwent a mastectomy in 1947 and died at home in Melbourne two years later; she was buried in the West Terrace Cemetery, Adelaide.

The Dr Ruby Davy prize for composition is awarded annually by the University of Adelaide.

Rita M. Wilson's biography entitled "Ruby Davy: academic and artiste: a biography of Dr. Ruby Davy: Australia's first woman Doctor of Music." was published by the Salisbury and District Historical Society, South Australia, in 1995.

Fellow Australian composer Ernest Edwin Mitchell was a tutor.

composition from 1935

== Works ==
- Australia fair and free - words by Louis Lavater; music by Ruby C. Davy.
- 1934 Welcome to Australia [music] / words by William Cathcart; music by Ruby C. Davy.
- 1935 Barcarolle for violin and piano
- Magnificat and Nunc dimittis
