= Jack Lumsdaine =

Australian singer (1895–1948)

John Sinclair Lumsdaine

Background information
- Born: 18 November 1895
- Origin: Australia
- Died: 28 August 1948 (aged 52)
- Military career
- Unit: First Australian Imperial Force

John Sinclair Lumsdaine (18 November 1895 – 28 August 1948) was an Australian singer and songwriter.

His best known songs celebrate Australian personalities Donald Bradman, Phar Lap and Sydney Harbour Bridge. He was highly sought for advertising campaigns like Cornflakes and Flour.

In the 1930s he was on the announcing staff of Sydney radio station 2GB.

== Military service ==
Jack Lumsdaine enlisted in the Australian Imperial Force in 1915. He suffered a gas attack in France and became known as the whispering baritone in his radio and Jazz recording career.

== Works ==
- 1923 Wodonga
- 1924 Aussie Rose
- 1925 Somewhere South of Shanghai
- 1927 You'll Miss Me When I'm Gone
- 1927 Canberra is Calling to you
- 1928 Calling to You
- 1941 Am I?
- 1942 Digger
- 1945 Sydney Flour Song
- England in the Morning
- Cobber o Mine
- We're Hanging Out Our Washing on The Siegfried Line
- 1946 Curl The Mo, Uncle Joe
- Johnie our Aeroplane Girl
- Verm-X song
- Cornflakes song
- Tintex song
- Banish The Budget Blues

== Memorabilia ==
- Photograph of him on some sheet music
- Photograph

== Recordings ==
- 1932 I'm Waiting for Ships That Never Come In
- 1938 Queanbeyan
- 1928 Honeymoon Cottage
- 1943 Scallywag
- 1938 Canberra is Calling to You

Sheet music from forty songs are preserved at Australian libraries. Many performed with the 2FC radio orchestra or George Trevare. Thirty-six of his recordings like You'll Miss Me When I'm Gone are preserved at the National Film and Sound Archive.

== See also ==
- Music of Australia
- First Australian Imperial Force
