= Edith Harrhy =

British-born Australian composer and entertainer (1893–1969)

Edith Mary Harrhy
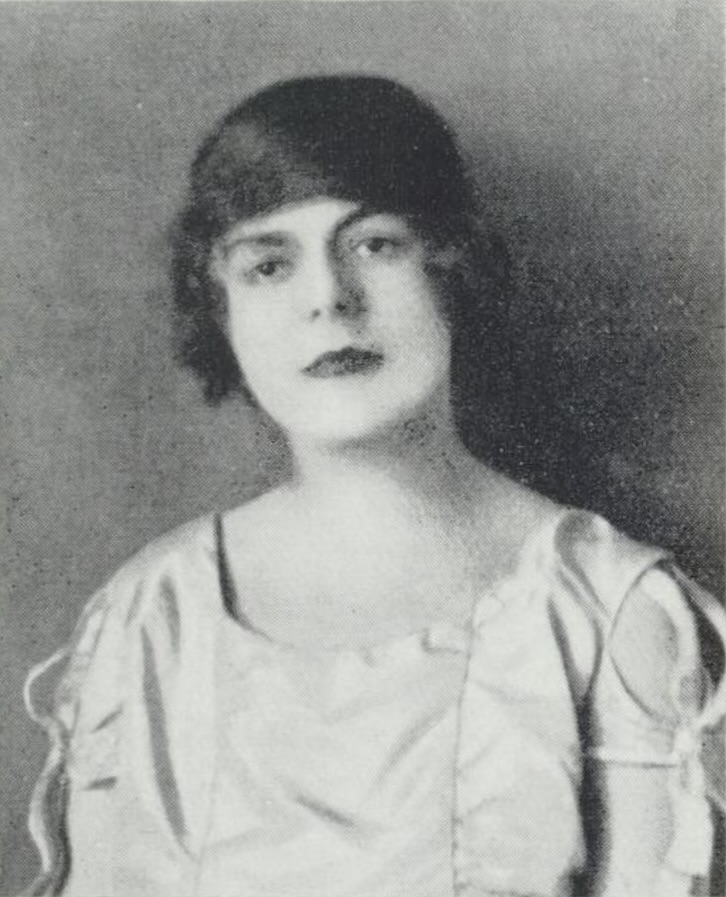
- Born: 19 December 1893; London
- Died: 24 February 1969 (aged 75); Oxley, Queensland
- Children: at least two

Edith Mary Harrhy became Edith Mary Daly (19 December 1893 – 24 February 1969) was a British-born Australian composer and entertainer.

== Biography ==
Harrhy was born in 1893 in London. Her father, Jonathan Harrhy, came from Monmouthshire and her mother was Annie Harrhy (born Rose). She was proud of her Welsh roots. She went to school on London and she was taking music exams with Trinity College when she was seven years old. She joined the Guildhall School of Music where she studied singing mezzo-soprano and the piano. She gained expertise in harmony, opera and counterpoint and came to know the violinist Mary Law.

In 1914 she left the Guildhall School of Music which had been overseen by Landon Ronald to tour as a duo with Mary Law. They would make recording of their performances and Mary who would go on to record her performances on the violin. They toured Australia in 1915 and South Africa in 1916.

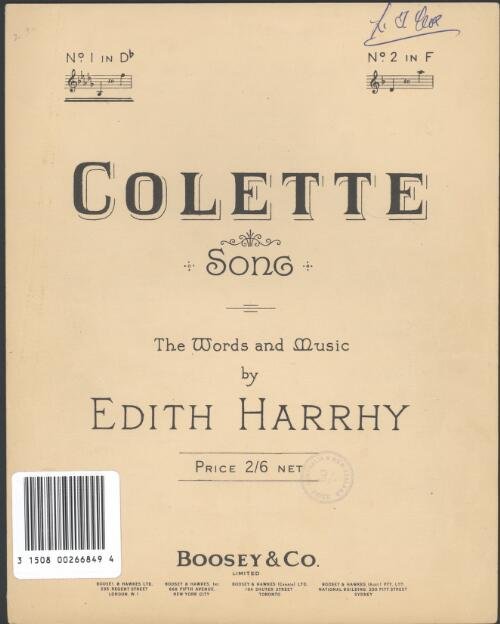
Collette by Edith Harrhy

Harrhy had met William Constant Beckx Daly in Australia and after they married in London they settled in Melbourne where they lived with her husband's family. Her husband travelled as a pharmaceutical representative and she would arrange broadcasts and performances with accompanying artists in the places that he had to visit.

She became a musical director in Australia. Gertrude Johnson who had been a singer began the National Theatre Movement in Melbourne in 1935. Harrhy was soon involved and in the 1940s she was its musical director until 1948.

Edith Harrhy wrote about a thousand songs and about 200 of them were published. The Thrush was a test piece in the 1953 Grace Bros. National Eisteddfod, in Sydney.

Edith Harrhy also created the light operas, Alaya and The Jolly Friar.

Harrhy died in Oxley near Brisbane in 1969.

In the 1990s her daughter, Honor Coutts, published her biography, Edith Harrhy, Consummate Musician: A Personal Memoir by Her Daughter Honor.

Edith Harrhy's papers are with the National Library of Australia.

== Musical compositions (incomplete) ==
=== Songs ===
- An Australian Lullaby (voice and piano) - words by Charles Souter
- Autumn Leaves (soprano and piano) - words by Helen Dames
- Summer is Dying (soprano and piano) - words by Helen Dames
- The Thrush (soprano and piano) - words by Charles Souter
- What The Red Haired Bosun Said
- You Came to Me in May (voice and piano) - words by Will Foster

=== Solo piano ===
- On the Wanganui (1939)

=== Light operas ===
- The Jolly Friar
- Alaya
