= Vera Buck =

Australian composer and pianist (1903–1986)

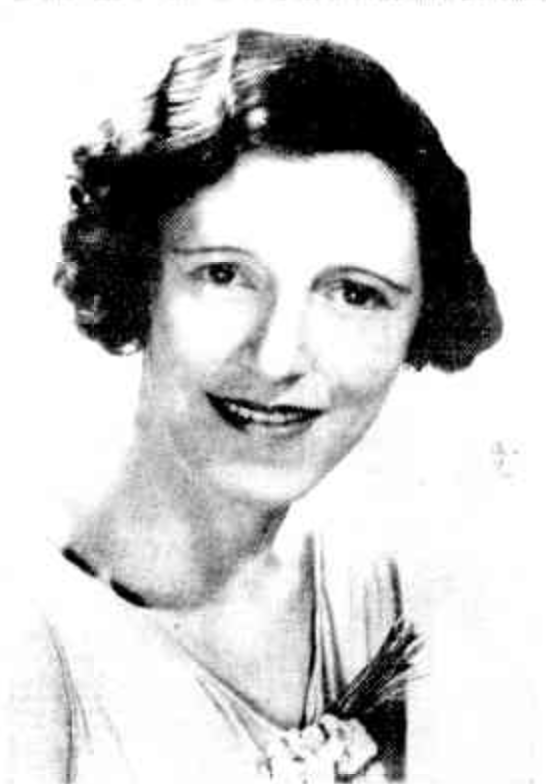
- Born: Vear Winifred Buck; 15 February 1903; Kew, Victoria
- Died: 2 January 1986 (aged 82); Kew, Victoria
- Occupations: composer and pianist

Vera Winifred Buck (15 February 1903 – 2 January 1986) was an Australian composer and pianist.

== Biography ==
The daughter of William Buck, an accountant, and Tessa Quinn Herberte, she was born in Kew, Victoria and was educated at private schools in Melbourne. She began playing the piano at a young age. At the age of 15, she wrote her first song Love of You. During the late 1920s, Buck was accompanist for radio station 3AR. In 1930, she received a scholarship to study composition with Fritz Hart. Later that same year, she arranged for her children to be looked after by relatives and moved to Britain. There, she composed songs and performed on stage and on radio. She also coached singers such as Jessie Matthews, Florence Desmond and Robert Naylor.

Her 1932 song The Birds with lyrics by Hilaire Belloc was performed by Florence Austral. She also composed Serenity, published in 1937, with lyrics by her sister Lilian, a poet. Songs published in London included:The Donkey (1935), lyrics by G. K. Chesterton,Blue Bows (1937), lyrics by Helen Taylor, and This Is My Prayer (1938), lyrics by Kenneth Ellis.

Under the pseudonym Pat Francis, she wrote light songs including Across the Sands of Time (1936) and How Wonderful (1937). Her songs Reminiscence (1936), with lyrics by Noel Cripps, and Full Sail (1937), with lyrics by Alfred Perceval Graves, were performed at events associated with the coronation of King George VI.

Buck returned to Melbourne in 1938, continuing to perform. She was resident pianist for radio station 3AW. During World War II, she performed to raise funds and to entertain the troops. Buck served as vice-president of the Guild of Australian Composers. Songs from this period include: A Hymn for Country (1943), lyrics by Toyohiko Kagawa, Take Thou the Burden, Lord (1943), lyrics by Toyohiko Kagawa, and Until the Day I Die (1945), lyrics by A. D. Jones.

=== Professional engagements ===
- Guild of Australian Composers – Vice-President
- Performed as a musician in productions of Larger than Life in Melbourne (1952) and Sydney (1953).

== Personal ==
In 1922, she married Edgar Charles Wilson Burridge; the couple had two daughters and divorced in 1937. In 1940, she married Bramwell John Gilchrist in the chapel of Wesley Church, Lonsdale Street, Melbourne. His wedding gift to his bride was a grand piano.

She died in Kew at the age of 82.

== Musical compositions (incomplete) ==
=== Songs ===
- Across the Sands of Time (1936) – under pseudonym Pat Francis – words by Bruce Sievier
- The Birds (1932) – words by Hilaire Belloc
- Blue Bows (1937) – words by Helen Taylor
- The Donkey (1935) – words by G. K. Chesterton
- Full Sail (1937) – words by Perceval Graves
- How Wonderful (1937) – under pseudonym Pat Francis – words by Bruce Sievier
- A Hymn for Country (1943) – words by Toyohiko Kagawa
- Love of You (1918) – words by
- Reminiscence (1936) – words by Noel Cripps
- Serenity (1937) – words by Lilian Buck
- Take Thou the Burden, Lord (1943) – words by Toyohiko Kagawa
- This Is My Prayer (1938) – words by Kenneth Ellis
- Until the Day I Die (1945) – words by A. D. Jones

=== Solo piano ===
- Marche Orientale (1928)
- Piper’s Dance (1931)

=== Orchestral ===
Concerto Impressionistique
