= Catherine Duc =

Vietnamese-Australian composer

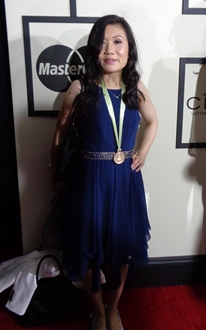
- Catherine Duc at the 58th Annual Grammy Awards

Background information
- Origin: Australia
- Genres: Electronic dance music, New-age, ambient, electronic, Celtic, world, pop
- Years active: Since 2002
- Labels: Independent, distributed by The Orchard
- Website: Catherine Duc Official site

Catherine Duc is a Vietnamese-Australian composer and producer of music blending elements of ambient, classical, electronica and world music. Her work has been aired on Australian Broadcasting Corporation's ABC Jazz. In 2005 Duc issued her debut album, Visions and Dreams.

== History ==
Catherine Duc was born in Melbourne. She started her musical journey from a young age. As a child, Duc studied keyboard and classical piano and later completed studies in music arrangement, live recording and production at the Alfred Brash Sound House in the Melbourne Concert Hall. She also has a Diploma in Film Music Composition from The London School of Creative Studies. Her work has been aired on Australian Broadcasting Corporation's ABC Jazz. In July 2005 Duc issued her debut album, Visions and Dreams, and the following year she supplied keyboards for Priscilla Hernández' album, Ancient Shadows.

In October 2012 Duc released the single "Single Glance", which was produced by Stuart Epps (Elton John, Robbie Williams).

In 2015 she signed a record deal for her album "Voyager" with UK based label MG Music (owned by New Age composer and musician Medwyn Goodall) and received a Grammy nomination for 'Best New Age Album'.

In 2016 Duc remixed The Corrs' song "Intimacy" which was released through Warner Music UK.

== Musical style ==
Duc's music is a blend of Celtic and world melodies with contemporary electronica rhythms and atmospheric soundscapes. Anna Kosmanovski of Mediasearch described her style as "neo classical" and "Celtic, mystical sounding electronic, has none of the lullaby substance of ordinary classical music".

== Discography ==
=== Albums ===
- Voyager - MG Music (The Orchard) (1 July 2015)
- Visions and Dreams - The Orchard (5 July 2005)

=== Singles ===
- "Remember When..." (featuring Jonas Isacsson) - The Orchard (16 July 2021) (Digital release)
- Z8phyR - "Drop of a Dream" (Catherine Duc Dream Remix) - Cool Breeze (28 February 2020) (Digital release)
- Ben Hobbs - "Blind to You" (Catherine Duc 'Stargazing' Remix) - Ben Hobbs (3 August 2018) (Digital release)
- Paloma Rush - "Drive" (Catherine Duc Rush Hour Remix) - Built To Last Music (14 April 2017) (Digital release)
- The Corrs - "Intimacy" (Catherine Duc Infinite Remix) - Warner Music UK (13 July 2016) (Digital release)
- "Single Glance" - The Orchard (26 October 2012) (Digital release)

== Awards ==
- 2016: Grammy Nomination for 'Best New Age Album'
- 2012: Music Oz Awards, Instrumental Finalist
- 2011: Hollywood Music in Media Awards, New Age Nomination
- 2008: Toronto International Music Awards, International Instrumental CD Album & Best International Instrumental Up and Coming Producer
- 2007: International Music Online Awards, Best Instrumental Artist
- 2006: Los Angeles Music Awards, Instrumental Artist of The Year
- 2006: Just Plain Folks Music Awards, World Music Nomination
- 2005: Unisong International Songwriting Contest, Honorable Mention - Instrumental
- 2002: Philips Australia Song Competition, Best Dance/Electronica Song
