= Giuseppe Caglioti =

Italian physicist (1931–2024)

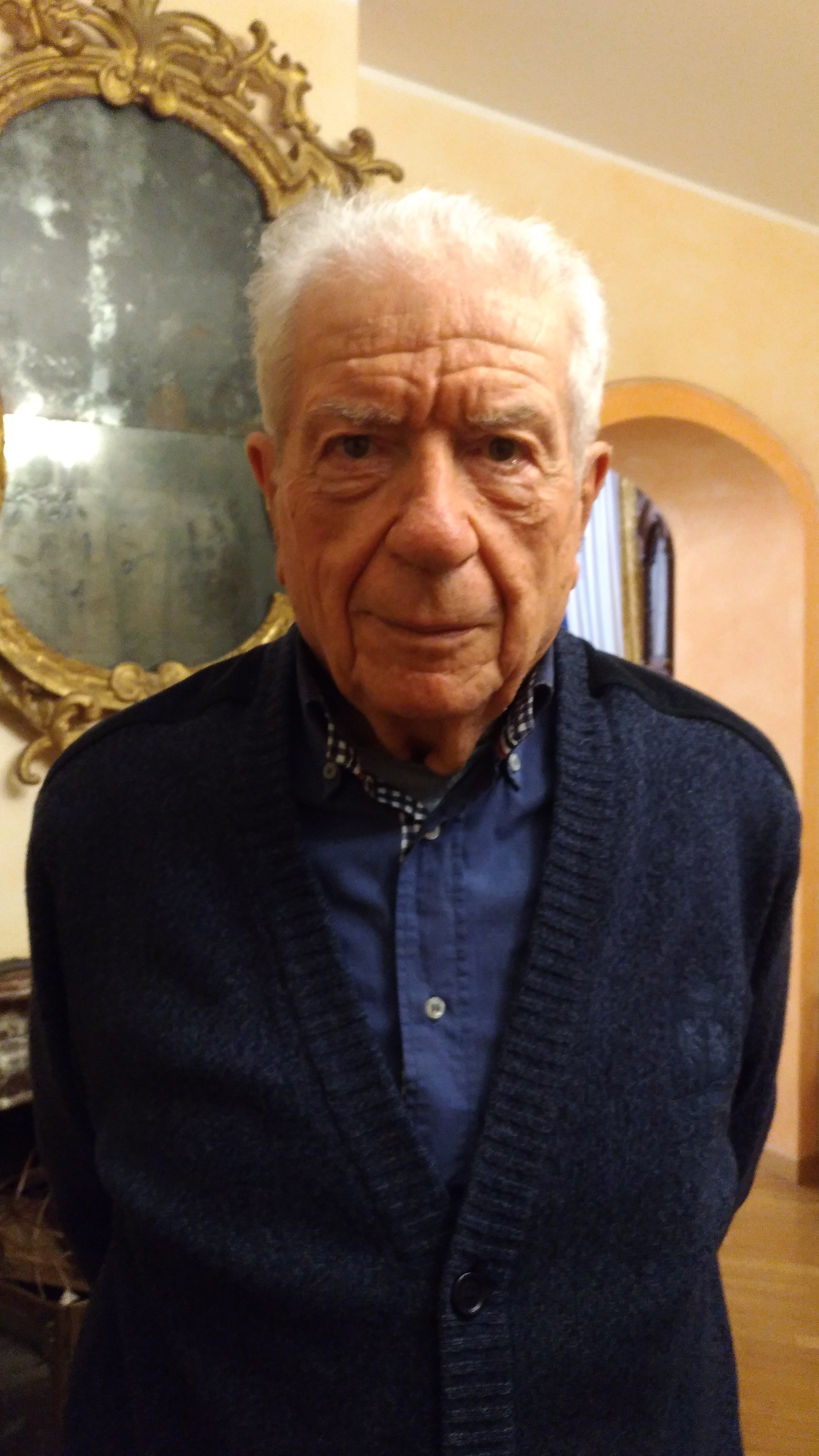

Giuseppe Caglioti (19 August 1931 – 16 July 2024) was an Italian physicist, academic, researcher and writer. He was an Emeritus Professor of Physics of Matter at the Polytechnic University of Milan. Caglioti was an Effective Member of the Istituto Lombardo Accademia di Scienze e Lettere, Emeritus Fellow of the World Academy of Art and Science and of the Italian Physical Society and member of the Istituto di Studi Superiori Gerolamo Cardano.

== Life and career ==
Caglioti graduated in Physics at the University of Rome La Sapienza in 1953, and specialized at the same university in Nuclear Physics (1955), and at the Argonne National Laboratory, Illinois, USA, in Nuclear Science and Engineering (1956). Assistant at the Physics Institute of University of Rome (1953–1955), then researcher at the National Nuclear Energy Committee (CNEN then ENEA) of Italy (1955–1970). In this position, Caglioti was resident research associate at the Argonne National Laboratory (1956–1957), the Atomic Energy of Canada Ltd. (AECL), Chalk River, Canada (1959), at the Joint Research Centre of the European Union, Ispra. Italy (1959–1971), and intermittently (1966–1973) visiting professor at the Brookhaven National Laboratory and Stony Brook University, NY, USA. Caglioti was Full Professor of solid state physics (1970–2006), and Director of the Institute (now Department) of Nuclear Engineering at the Polytechnic University of Milan; Emeritus Professor from 2006.

Caglioti died on 16 July 2024, at the age of 92.

== Research ==
Caglioti’s original research interests have been addressed to experimental basic and applied nuclear physics, neutron spectroscopy, and the study of the structure and mechanical performance of materials. In these areas, Caglioti was the author/co-author of about 130 scientific publications, mostly in international journals or books. Starting from the eighties, his interests have shifted toward technological research (one patent on extra-light automobile wheels) and the development of the Piezo-MusiColor Project: a synergetic combination of science, technology and art (one patent on MusiColor) aiming to an interactive, synaesthesic enjoyment of music and sounds also by blind, deaf and hard-of-hearing persons.

Along these cross-disciplinary research lines, Caglioti explored the concept of symmetry breaking as a common feature in science and art, and the connection between quantum physics and perception. These investigations have been the subject of about 50 papers on correlations between human and natural sciences, of a good number of popular books, and of a graduate course on Aesthetics – Scientific Components of Harmony and Beauty, held for many year (2003-2010) at the Faculty of Design, Polytechnic University of Milan.

== Awards and honours ==
- 1963: Physics Prize of the Italian Physical Society
- 1978: Gold Medal for Physical Sciences of the Academy of the Forty, Italy
- 2005: Gold Medal of the National Academy of Lincei, Italy

== Books ==
=== As author ===
- Giuseppe Caglioti: Introduzione alla fisica dei materiali (Zanichelli, Bologna, 1974)
- Giuseppe Caglioti: Simmetrie infrante nella scienza e nell'arte (Città Studi, Milan, first edition 1983; second edition 1994)
- Giuseppe Caglioti: Symmetriebrechung und Wahrnehmung - Beispiele aus der Erfahrungswelt, with a preface by Hermann Haken (Friedr. Vieweg & Sohn Verlagsgesellschaft mbH, Braunschweig 1990)
- Giuseppe Caglioti: The Dynamics of Ambiguity, with a Preface by Hermann Haken (Springer, 1992); Japanese edition with a preface by K. Husimi (Kodansha, 1997); Russian edition, with a preface by Ilya Prigogine (MIR, 1998).
- Giuseppe Caglioti: Eidos e psiche, Struttura della materia e dinamica dell’immagine, with a preface by Giuseppe Pontiggia (Ilisso, Nuoro 1995); Japanese edition (Yakuyosha Co., 2001)
- Giuseppe Caglioti: Casanova e la scienza (Moretti e Vitali Ed,, Bergamo 1998)
- G. Caglioti, F.G. Bassani e J. Ziman (Eds.), Theory of Condensed Matter (IAEA, Vienna, 1968)
- Caglioti, Giuseppe; Tchouvileva, Tatiana V.; Cocchiarella, Luigi (2021). Odi et amo. Ambiguità percettive e pensiero quantistico. Mimesis. ISBN 978-88-575-6600-9.

=== As editor ===
- G. Caglioti (Ed.), Atomic Structure and Mechanical Properties of Metals (North Holland, Amsterdam,1976)
- G. Caglioti e A. Ferro Milone (Eds), Mechanical and thermal behaviour of metallic materials (North Holland, Amsterdam 1982)
- G. Caglioti, H. Haken e L. Lugiato (Eds.), Synergetics and Dynamic Instabilities, (North Holland, Amsterdam, 1988)
- Paolo Bisogno e Giuseppe Caglioti (Eds.), Scienza ed Arte, Prometheus 11 (Franco Angeli, Milano 1991)
- G. Caglioti, T. Mohri and E Evangelisti (Eds.) The Challenge of Magnesium Alloys, Metallurgical Science and Technology, vol. 16 n. 1-2 (1998)
- Giuseppe Caglioti (Ed.), Componenti scientifiche dell’armonia e del bello (Istituto Lombardo Accademia di Scienze e Lettere, Milano, 2001)
- P. Bisogno, D. Bruni, G. Caglioti (Eds.), Immagini e conoscenza (Franco Angeli, Milano, 2001)
