= Sally Greenaway =

Australian classical music composer (born 1984)

- Born: 1984 (age 41–42); Canberra, Australia
- Occupations: Composer, pianist

Sally Greenaway (born 1984) is a composer and pianist based in Canberra, Australia.

== Career ==
Greenaway trained in jazz at Canberra's Australian National University School of Music and the Royal College of Music in London.

After winning Jazzgroove Mothership Orchestra's National Big Band Composition Competition in 2008, Greenaway's composition was recorded and broadcast on ABC Classic FM. She continued recording with several big bands and released her debut album Dig This: Exploring the Big Band in 2013.

Her second album, Aubade & Nocturne, was released by ABC Classics in 2014. Gramophone likened it to the work of Peter Sculthorpe, Nigel Westlake, and other Australian composers. The Sydney Morning Herald gave it 4/5 stars and noted that, while it wasn't thematically cohesive, it was "a rewarding experience".

In 2015 she won the inaugural Merlyn Myer Composing Women's Commission, and was commissioned to create a new work which was performed by the Syzygy Ensemble at its premiere in 2016. The work The 7 Great Inventions of the Modern Industrial Age (dramatic music) later won the Canberra Critics Circle Awards and the APRA Art Music ACT Award for Instrumental Work of the Year.

The Melbourne Symphony Orchestra commissioned her work Worlds Within Worlds in 2015. It premiered in Melbourne as a chamber piece before being rearranged for a larger ensemble and performed by the National Capital Orchestra in Canberra.

In 2018 her collaboration with Musica Viva, Da Vinci's Apprentice, toured schools across Australia.

Her next solo album Delights and Dances was due in 2022. Greenaway's 2024 Birthday Suite was the first work by an Australian composer for the Veeh Harp, a special box zither and musical notation system which can be played by anyone regardless of age or musical ability, originally designed for the inventor's son who was born with Down syndrome.

Greenaway' piece Stay Awhile was voted no. 56 in the 2017 ABC Classic 100 Countdown. Her piece Encore de Lírico was voted no. 65 in the 2025 countdown.

== Solo discography ==
- Dig This: Exploring the Big Band (2013)
- Aubade & Nocturne (2014)
- 7 Great Inventions of the Modern Industrial Age (2018)
- Delights and Dances (2022)

== Awards ==
Award	Year	Work	Status
National Big Band Composition Competition	2008	Falling of Seasons	Won
Canberra International Music Festival Young Composer Competition	2009	Waltzing Matilda	Won
Canberra Critics Circle Awards	2015	Aubade & Nocturne	Won
APRA Art Music ACT Award for Instrumental Work of the Year	2017	The 7 Great Inventions of the Modern Industrial Age	Won
Canberra Critics Circle Awards	2017	7 Great Inventions of the Modern Age	Won
