= Maria Grenfell =

Australian composer

Maria Grenfell (born 1969) is an Australian music teacher and composer.

== Early life and education ==
Maria Grenfell was born in Petaling Jaya, Malaysia in 1969. She grew up and was educated in Christchurch, New Zealand, where she graduated from the University of Canterbury with a Master of Music degree. She subsequently went to the US, where she completed a Master of Arts at the Eastman School of Music in Rochester, New York, and a doctorate of musical arts from the University of Southern California in Los Angeles, while also lecturing in music there. While in the USA she was taught by Stephen Hartke, Erica Muhl, James Hopkins, and Morten Lauridsen in Los Angeles, and Joseph Schwantner and Samuel Adler in Rochester, New York.

== Career ==
Grenfell allows her work to be influenced by poetic, literary and visual sources but also by non-Western music and literature. Grenfell has been a violinist with the Christchurch Symphony Orchestra and the New Zealand Youth Orchestra, and has performed bowed piano with the University of Southern California Percussion Ensemble.

In Spring of 2013, Grenfell was a visiting professor at Stephen F. Austin State University in Nacogdoches, Texas. In the Fall of 2019, Grenfell served as Kerr Composer-in-Residence at the Oberlin Conservatory of Music.

In 2020, Grenfell composed the score for the ABC documentary Quoll Farm. It was recorded with performers from the Tasmanian Symphony Orchestra. She also wrote the score for Simon Plowright's documentary, Living With Devils, in 2023.

As of 2021, she is an associate professor at the Conservatorium of Music at the University of Tasmania.

== Awards ==
Her awards include the Jimmy McHugh Composition Prize and the Halsey Stevens Prize from the University of Southern California, the Composers’ Association of New Zealand Trust Fund Award and the University of Otago's prestigious Philip Neill Memorial Prize. Winner of the Tasmanian State Award for Ten Suns Ablaze in 2013, and Spirals in 2018 at the Australian Art Music Awards.

== Personal life ==
Grenfell lives in Hobart, Australia, with her husband, guitarist David Malone, and their two children.

== See also ==
- Australian Music Centre
