= Paolo Giorza =

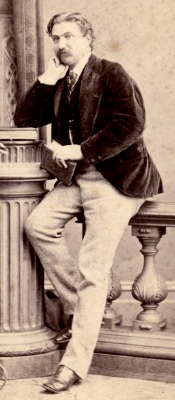
- Paolo Giorza 1870

Background information
- Born: November 11, 1832; Milan
- Died: March 4, 1914 (aged 81)
- Occupations: Composer, Conductor, Teacher
- Years active: 1850-1900

Paolo Giorza (11 November 1832 – 4 March 1914) was an Italian-Australian composer of classical music and Romantic music.

He was born in Milan, son of Luigi Giorza, a painter and singer. His father prompted his musical interest. He is revered in Milan, where he wrote the song "La bella Gigogin" in 1858, performed at the Milan Carcano Theatre. The song became symbolic of Italian culture.

During his lifetime, he produced and wrote many scores including various waltzes. Giorza travelled much of the world working in Venice, Vienna, London and Paris. In the late 1860s he worked in America, directing the orchestra at the Academy of Music in New York City. He composed the music for the cancan dance, introduced to America by his friend and fellow Milanese artist, ballerina Giuseppina Morlacchi. In 1871 he went to Australia where he succeeded as a composer. In 1884, he became unwell and returned to Europe and success at La Scala. He died on 4 May 1914.

1859 Polka

== Works ==
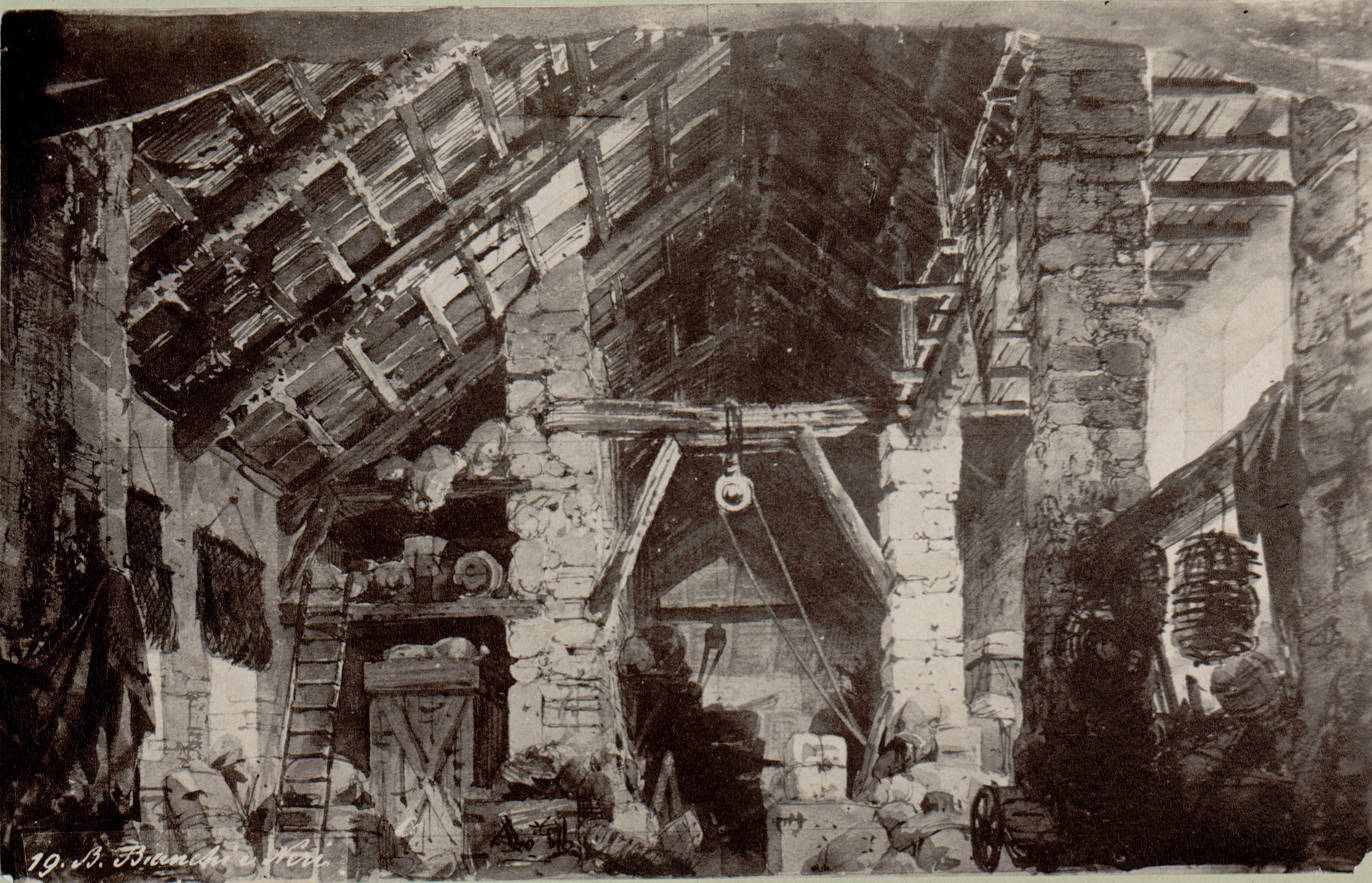
Magazzino, set design for I Bianchi ed i Negri act 5 (1863).

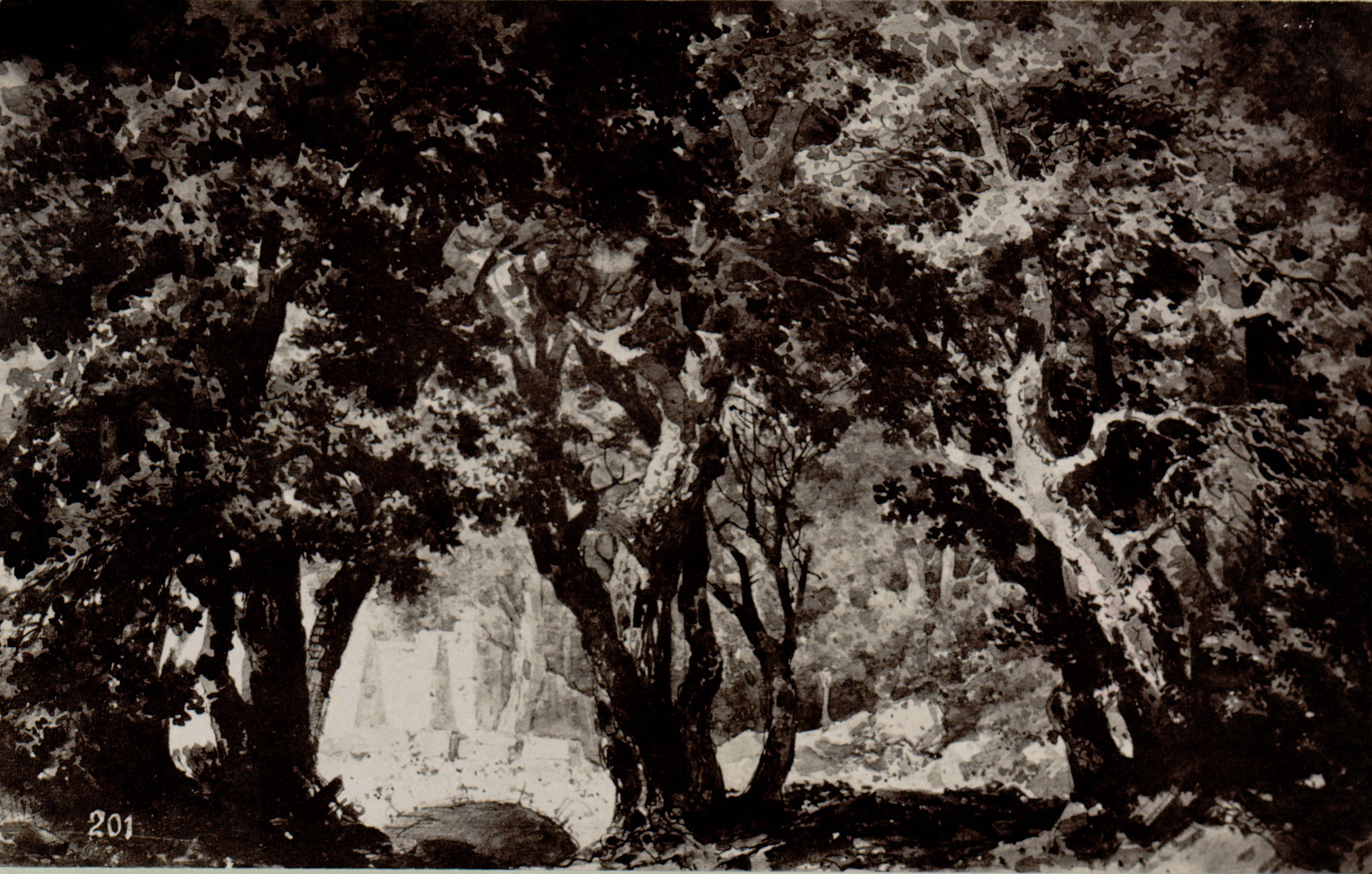
Luogo alpestre nell'interno d'una foresta, set design for Gazelda prologue scene 1 (1864).

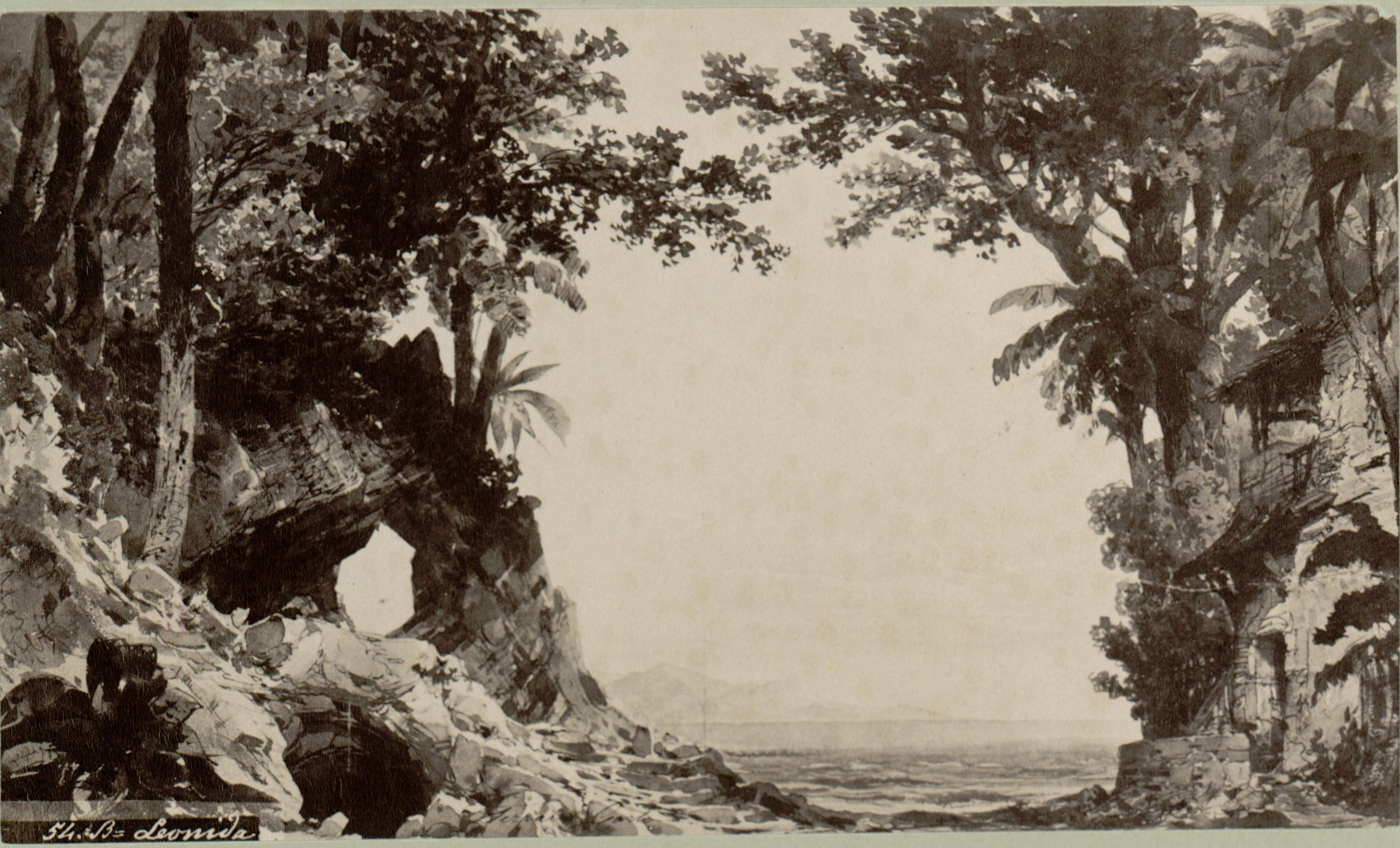
L'isola delle antille abitata dai corsari, set design for Leonilda act 1 scene 1 (1865).

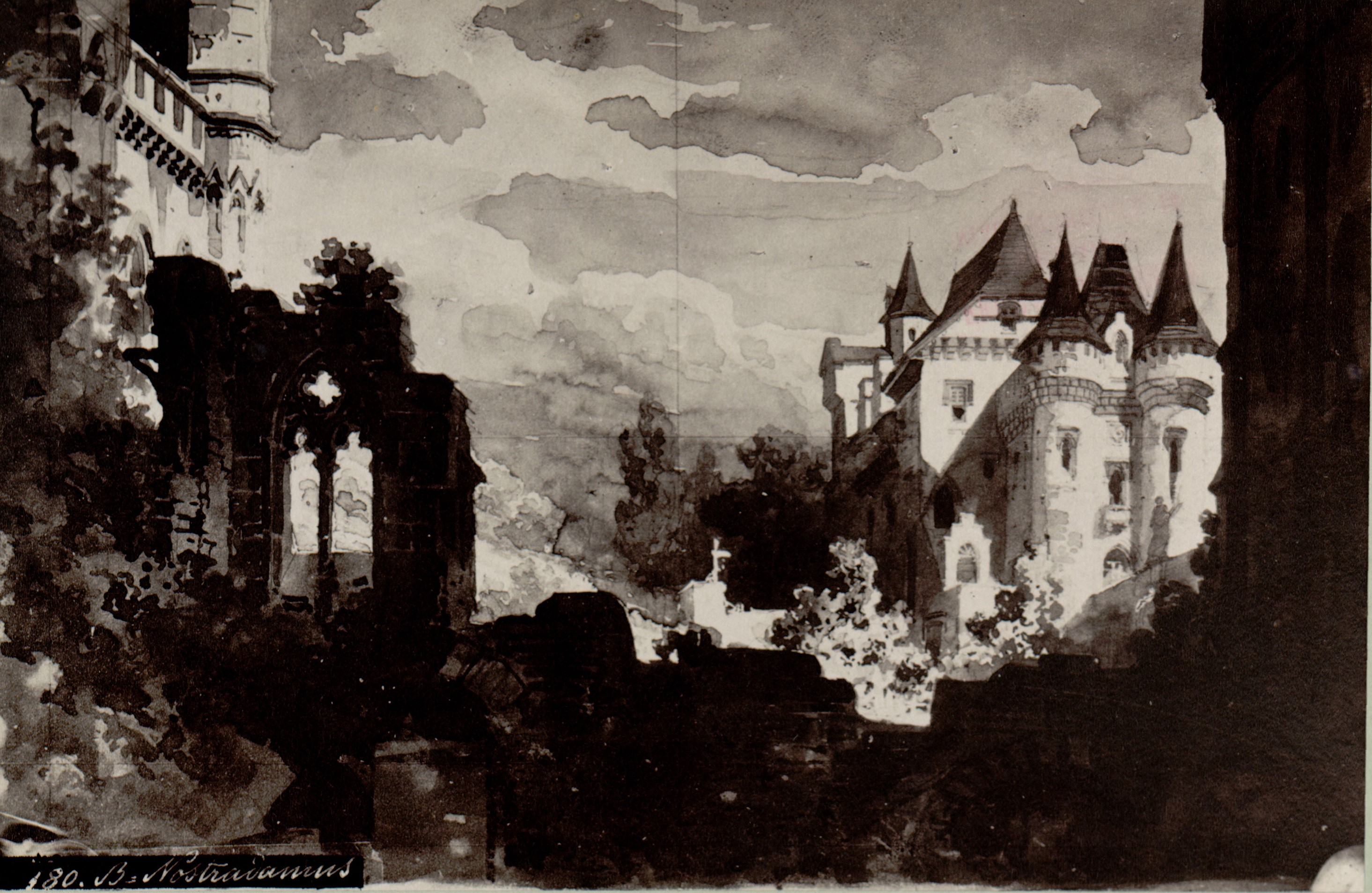
Piazza di Leutschau, set design for Nostradamus act 1 (1862).

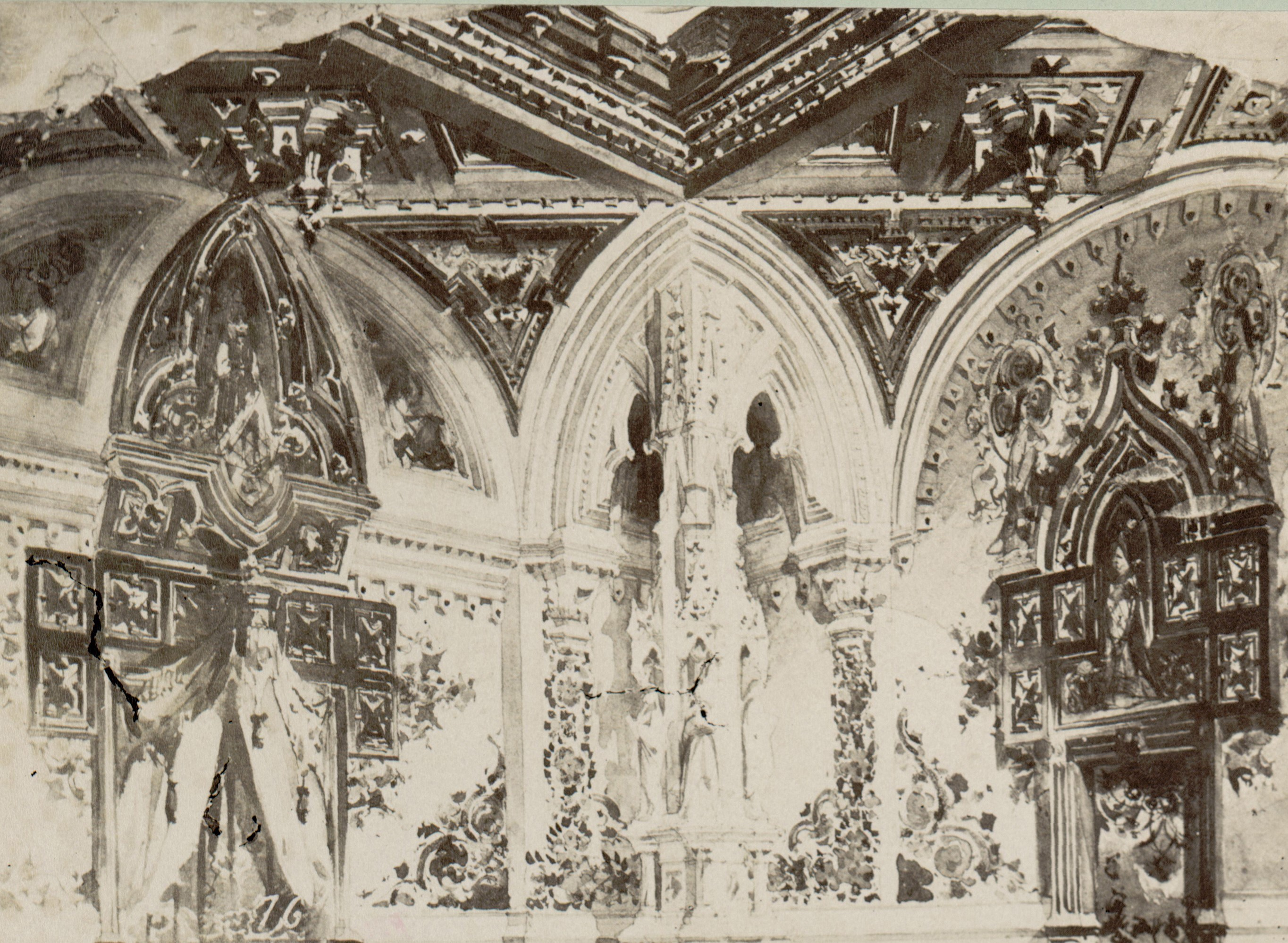
Ricco gabinetto, set design for Anello infernale (1862).

Ballets (Incomplete list)

- Un Fallo, 1853, Teatro alla Scala, Milan (Composed jointly with A. Buzzi. Choreography by G. Rota)
- I Bianchi ei Negri, 1853, Teatro alla Scala, Milan (Choreography by G. Rota)
- Il Giocatore, 1853, Teatro alla Canobbiana, Milan (Composed jointly with G. Bajetti and L. Madoglio. Choreography by G. Rota)
- Shakespeare Ovvero Il Sogno di una notte d´estate, 1855, Teatro alla Scala, Milan (Composed jointly with C. Dall’Argine. Choreography by G. Casati)
- Delia, 1855, Teatro La Fenice, Venice (Choreography by G. Rota)
- La Giocoliera, 1855, Teatro La Fenice, Venice (Choreography by P. Borri)
- Lucilla, 1856, Teatro La Fenice, Venice (Some music was adapted from ballets by C. Pugni. Choreography by P. Borri)
- Tutti Coreografi, 1856, Teatro alla Canobbiana, Milan (Choreography by G. Rota)
- Il Conte di Montecristo, 1856, Teatro La Fenice, Venice (Choreography by G. Rota)
- Gabriella, 1857, Teatro Comunale, Bologna (Choreography by P. Borri)
- 1812 ovvero Carlo il Guastatore, 1857 (Choreography by G. Rota)
- Madamigella di Lavallière, 1857, Teatro La Fenice, Venice (Choreography by E. Viotti)
- Rodolfo di Gerolstein, 1858, Teatro alla Scala, Milan (Choreography by P. Borri)
- Cleopatra, 1858, Teatro alla Scala, Milan (Choreography by G. Rota)
- L'Ultimo Abencerragio, 1858, Teatro Riccardi, Bergamo (Choreography by L. Bretin)
- Irene, 1859, Teatro Regio, Turin (Choreography by G. Rota)
- Un´Avventura di Carnevale, 1859, Teatro alla Scala, Milan (Choreography by P. Borri)
- Lo Spirito Maligno, 1860, Teatro Regio, Parma (Choreography by G. Rota)
- Cherubina o La Sposa di Posillipo, 1860, Teatro Regio, Parma (Choreography by L. Viena)
- Pedrilla, 1861, Teatro Regio, Parma (Choreography by L. Viena)
- La Contessa d´Egmont, 1861, Teatro alla Scala, Milan (Choreography by G. Rota)
- Fiammella, 1862, Teatro Regio, Turin (Choreography by P. Borri)
- Cristoforo Colombo, 1862, Teatro Carlo Felice, Genoa (Choreography by H. Monplaisir)
- Il Vampiro, 1863, Teatro Regio, Turin (Choreography by G. Rota)
- Emma, 1864, Teatro Regio, Turin (Choreography by G. Rota)
- La Maschera o Le Notti di Venezia, 1864, Salle Le Peletier, Paris (Choreography by G. Rota)
- Salammbò, 1864, Teatro Regio, Turin (Choreography by L. Viena)
- Leonilda ovvero La Sposa del Filibustiere, 1865, Teatro alla Scala, Milan (Choreography by P. Taglioni)
- Idea, 1867, Teatro Regio, Turin (Choreography by P. Borri)
- La Fata Nix, 1871, Teatro La Fenice, Venice (Composed jointly with E. Bernardi, G. Rosari, and L. Angeli. Choreography by L. Danesi)
- Bacco e Arianna, 1876, Teatro La Fenice, Venice (Composed jointly with G. A. Scaramelli, Amadei Zesckevich, and Andrea Zesckevich. Choreography by L. Danesi)
- Rodope, 1884, Teatro Regio, Turin (Choreography by R. Grassi)

Dance music (Incomplete list)

- Miss Ella - valzer, Op. 25
- Mercallo - schottisch
- Porto-Porto - polka
- Orginale - polka
- Souvenir de la Jeunesse - valzer
- Perlina - schottisch
- I Fuochi d'Artificio del Castel S. Giorgio - polka
- Cavour - polka
- Eugénie - valzer
- Magenta e San Martino - quadriglia
- La Stella Cometa - mazurka
- I Bersaglieri Piemontesi - galop
- I Milanes - quadriglia
- Zarina - mazurka
- Costanza - schottisch
- Garibaldi - polka
- Ciuf-ciuf - schottisch
- Polka Populare - veneziana
- Cerisette - polka
- Un Déjeuner- polka
- A Palermo - galop
- I Colli Bolognesi - valzer
- Mao - polka
- Cialdini - polka
- Caprera - valzer
- Anita - valzer
- Cavalleria Nazionale Bolognese - galop
- Milazzo - quadriglia
- Un Sospiro a Venezia - mazurka
- Gli Ultimi Strepiti del Carnevale a Bologna - polka
- Laura - schottisch
- Scherzo - polka
- Amarilli - valzer
- Un Bacio - valzer
- Cardellino - polka
- Una Carezza - mazurka
- Funerali e Danze - valzer
- Ermelinda - schottisch
- Silfide - galop
- Gioie d’Amore - valzer
- Il Piacere - quadriglia
- Un Saluto a Firenze - valzer
- Un mio Segreto - polka
- Olympia Valse
- 1862 Ondina Polka, Op. 116
- Blumen aus Italien, Op. 217
- 1871 Trickett Galop (celebrating Edward Trickett, a champion Australian rower)
- 1877 Giulia Valse
- 1879 The Old Corporal Quadrille, dedicated to Eduardo Majeroni
- 1883 Adieu Waltz (for his departure from Australia)
- 1877 The Geelong Skating Rink Galop
- 1890 Cardellino Polka, Op. 123
- Land of the Sunny South, All Hail, an Australian National anthem
- Scottisch, Op. 117
- 1882 The Bay of Sydney Waltz (La Baja di Sydney Valse)

Operas

- Corrado Console di Milano, 1860, Teatro alla Scala, Milan (Libretto by L. Gualtieri)
- Alba Barozzi, 1884, sources are not in agreement to if it was ever performed (Libretto by

Religious music (Incomplete list)

- 1879 Sydney Exhibition Cantata, with words by Henry Kendall
- 1870 Messe Solennelle No.3

== Recordings ==
- Belles of Australia Waltz (Sydney Conservatorium)
- The Trickett Galop
- 2013 Regina Coeli (Choir of St Magnus-the-Martyr)
- 2015 Inexplicable Splendour (Choir of St Magnus-the-Martyr)

== Scores ==
- Free scores by Paolo Giorza at the International Music Score Library Project (IMSLP)

== Students ==
Giorza taught Australian composer Maude FitzStubbs (Mrs Harry Woods) while in Australia
