= Percy Code =

Australian classical composer and musician (1888–1953)

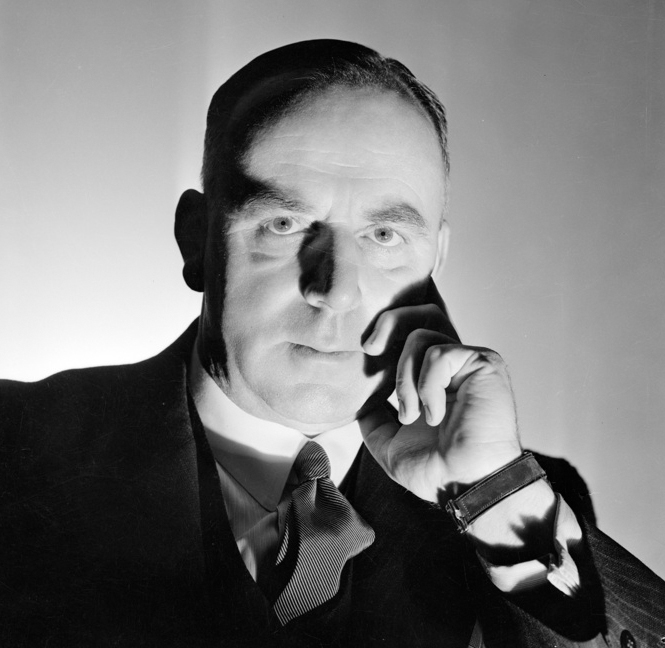

Edward Percival "Percy" Code (3 July 1888 – 16 October 1953) was an Australian classical composer and musician, specialising in cornet and trumpet. He is best known for his compositions for brass band, including many solo works.

== Biography ==
Percy Code was born in Melbourne, growing up in a musical family. His father, Edward Thomas Code, was a trumpeter who led his own ensemble, Code's Melbourne Brass Band. Percy learnt to play cornet and violin from his father, and played in his band. Aged 22 in 1910, he won the solo championship at the Royal South Street Competition in Ballarat. This saw him invited to England to play principal cornet with the Besses o' th' Barn Band, where he played professionally for the next few years.

After returning to Australia, he conducted community bands in cities such as Ballarat. He married Elsie Maude Miller in 1915, but the couple never had children, and lived apart for many years.

In 1921 Code moved to the United States, where he performed as a trumpeter with the San Francisco Symphony Orchestra under the direction of Alfred Hertz. In San Francisco he also worked as a film composer and theatre pit musician. He returned to Australia in 1924, working as a radio music presenter, in addition to continuing to conduct and write music. From 1929 he worked as a conductor with the ABC until retiring in 1951.

Percy Code died in Melbourne in 1953.

== Legacy ==
Code's compositions are not well known outside the brass band community. However, amongst brass band music enthusiasts, he remains a respected figure, with his works featured in a Percy Code Memorial Solo contest held at multiple Australian brass band competitions.

His collected works were first recorded in their entirety by euphonium player and music academic Matthew van Emmerik in 2017.
