= Ernest Truman =

Australian composer

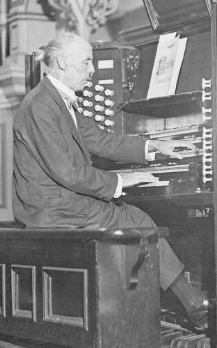

Background information
- Born: 29 December 1869; Weston-super-Mare, Somerset, England
- Died: 6 October 1948 (aged 78)
- Occupations: Composer, Organist
- Years active: 1890-1910

Ernest Edwin Philip Truman (29 December 1869 - 6 October 1948) was an Australian organist and a composer of light romantic era classical music.

== Early life ==
Truman was born was in Weston-super-Mare, Somerset, England. Son of Edwin Philip Truman, a fishmonger, and Elizabeth Robinson Crawfurd Smith. His family emigrated to Melbourne and then New Zealand, before settling in Hunters Hill, a suburb of Sydney, in 1885.

== Musical career ==
Truman was taught music by his father, then studied under Arthur J. Barth of Dunedin, New Zealand and Julius Buddee of Sydney.

From 1888 until 1893, Truman attended Leipzig Conservatory along with Australian Alfred Hill. While at Leipzig he composed 26 fugues, as a result of which he was known at the Conservatorium as "The English Bach".

Upon his return to Sydney, he became organist at Christ Church St Laurence from 1893 until 1896. He also presided at the console of St Mary's Cathedral, Sydney and St Patrick's, Church Hill in Sydney.

He was appointed City Organist in 1909 and presided at the Sydney Town Hall Grand Organ until 1935. He was the most competitive organist in New South Wales when appointed Sydney city organist in which role he held at least 3,000 recitals.

He accompanied many famous singers, including Dame Nellie Melba, Dame Clara Butt, Florence Austral, Lawrence Tibbett and Richard Crooks.

His ensemble pieces, still performed at festivals and music schools, are regarded as exemplary. Some of his works, such as In The Woods of Dandenong were influential in being early examples of an impressionist school of Australian music.

== Works ==
- String Quartet
- Matthis: The Polish Jew. An Opera
- Mass in D minor
- Operetta 'Club Life'
- Bushman's Song
- 1912 Magnificat: soli, chorus and full orchestra (with orchestral interlude), Op. 46
- The Pied Piper: cantata grotesque, Op. 50 / poem by Robert Browning; set to music by Ernest Truman

== Recordings ==
- 2015 The Tribute – A musical interpretation of the memorable address of the Bishop of Amiens (1919) by Ernest Truman (1869-1948)

Performed by Dimity Shepherd, mezzo-soprano and Stefan Cassomenos, piano.
