= Mary Mageau =

American-born Australian composer and musician

Mary Jane Mageau (4 September 1934 – 9 January 2020) was an American-born writer, harpsichordist and composer who had lived and worked in Australia since 1974. She was born in Milwaukee, Wisconsin, and studied at DePaul University, Chicago, and the University of Michigan where she studied with Leon Stein, Leslie Bassett and Ross Lee Finney, graduating with a Master of Music degree. In 1974 she accepted an Australian guest lectureship and there married architect Kenneth White, becoming an Australian citizen and resident of Queensland. She was particularly prominent in lobbying for opportunities for women composers.

Australian composer and pianist Larry Sitsky noted when reviewing her works, that Elite Syncopations, from Ragtime for Piano, was "a most attractive piece" and that when playing the work "the boundaries between Mageau and Joplin almost disappeared in my mind, and a rather satisfying whole emerged." Sitsky described her later works as more elegant and refined.

Mageau herself wrote of her artistic practice, "Through my music I always seek to communicate something fresh, new and expressive to the performer/s and listening public. Music must communicate - it must say something of meaning that will engage each listener in a satisfying artistic journey".

Mageau died in Queensland at the age of 85.

== Honors and awards ==
- Silver Medal, Louis Moreau Gottschalk International Composer's Competition
- Alienor Harpsichord Concerto Competition for Composers, 1994
- ASCAP Standard Award, granted annually since 1981
- Commendation, Vienna Modern Masters First Recording Awards, 1990

== Works ==
Selected works include:

- Triple Concerto for piano trio and orchestra
- Better Way for treble choir with piano
- Ragtime Remembered for quintet (2001)
- She Is a Cat for soprano and piano (2000)
- Ragtime Remembered for solo piano (2000)
- Contrasts in Continuum for unaccompanied viola (1968)
- Statement and Variations for viola solo (1979)
- Calls from the Heartland for violin with piano (1995)
- Preludes for Patricia, 4 Short Pieces for 2 violas or solo viola with prerecorded tape (1996)
- Moonlight Reflected on Water for unaccompanied piano (1984)

Her music has been recorded and issued on CD, including the Vienna Modern Masters Music From Six Continents CD Series.

Mageau is the author of two spiritual books; Insights : for an awakening humanity and A little book of living spiritually, published by Boolarong Press and poetry published in the United States by Red Moon Press, the MET Press, and in Australian and Canadian literary magazines.
