= Stephen Moreno =

Stephen Moreno (16 January 1889 – 6 March 1953) was an Australian classical music composer. He was born in Spain. where he became a novice monk in the Benedictine order. He was ordained in New Norcia, Western Australia. He was a prolific and respected artist.

Mature choral works were published for various ceremonial religious occasions, some with orchestrations for larger ensembles.

== Works ==
- 1933 Around the Boree Log (lyrics by Patrick Hartigan a.k.a. O'Brien)
- 1914 Field of the cloth of Gold

== Recordings ==
- Spanish serenade for Violin and piano
- 2005 New Norcia textures : for trumpet & pipe organ
