= Michael Sollis =

Australian interdisciplinary artist, musician and educator (1985–2026)

Michael Sollis

Michael Sollis (26 May 1985 – 1 May 2026) was an Australian interdisciplinary artist, musician, artistic director, researcher and teaching artist. He was the founder and director of The Griffyn Ensemble. His work spanned multiple disciplines, integrating music with themes of science, community engagement, and cross-cultural storytelling.

== Early life and education ==
Michael Sollis was born in Canberra on 26 May 1985. He published research analysing the interplay between language and music, and was influenced by the music and culture of Papua New Guinea. He studied with, and later taught alongside, Jim Cotter and Dr. Larry Sitsky at the ANU School of Music.

== Career ==
=== The Griffyn Ensemble ===
In the early 2000s, Sollis founded The Griffyn Ensemble, serving as its artistic director and composer. The ensemble is known for its genre-defying performances and collaborations across various artistic disciplines. They have been featured on ABC Classic, toured with Musica Viva In Schools, and were shortlisted for an Australian Classical Music Award.

The Griffyn Ensemble has a history of engaging with First Nations communities. Their 2021 project, "Songs from a Stolen Senate", featured collaborations with Indigenous Australian musicians, using parliamentary texts to create songs reflecting personal and cultural narratives.

=== Musica Viva Australia ===
In 2016, Sollis was appointed by Richard Gill as the inaugural artistic director of Education at Musica Viva Australia, overseeing the country's largest music education program. During the COVID-19 pandemic, Sollis led support for creativity in Australian schools and Australian artists, ensuring continued access to music education through online platforms and resources. Sollis has also contributed significantly to creativity in education, developing programs in Scottish prisons, Egyptian schools, regional Australia, and Australian universities.

=== National Folk Festival ===
In 2023, Sollis was appointed one of the co-artistic directors for the National Folk Festival, alongside Holly Downes and Chris Stone. Their leadership focuses on revitalizing the festival and integrating contemporary and traditional folk practices.

=== Composition and collaborations ===
Sollis's work spans multiple artistic disciplines and themes, including astronomy, interdisciplinary storytelling, and community engagement. Examples include:

- Astronomical themes: He collaborated with astronomer Fred Watson on musical works inspired by celestial bodies. His composition "Northern Lights" was influenced by Estonian composer Urmas Sisask, reflecting a shared fascination with astronomy and music. His project "One Sky Many Stories" combined Indigenous Australian and Western astronomical narratives, fostering cross-cultural dialogue.
- Visual arts and interdisciplinary projects: Sollis collaborated with Jyll Bradley on the "City of Trees" project, commissioned by the Canberra Centenary, exploring the intersection of music and the environment.
- Music education: He was commissioned by the Australian Society of Music Educators to develop new works for young people.
- Community engagement: His work "The Dirty Red Digger" explored the intersection of rugby league and World War I history, integrating live music with documentary elements. Sollis was influenced by his participation in the semi-professional Canberra Raiders Cup, playing First Grade for Rugby League club the Gungahlin Bulls from the age of 16.

== Cancer advocacy ==
In 2021, Sollis was diagnosed with advanced bowel cancer. Since then, he became an advocate for cancer awareness, sharing his journey to emphasize the importance of early detection and research. He created "Reticulum", a sound sculpture installed at the University of Canberra Hospital, which weaves together interviews from immunodeficient families with music inspired by the increasing isolation of the stars. Michael had also previously been an active advocate for Australian freelance artists.

== Death ==
Sollis died from bowel cancer in a Canberra hospice on 1 May 2026, at the age of 40.
