= Francis Hartwell Henslowe =

British civil servant, business manager and composer

Francis Hartwell Henslowe (1811–1878) was a British-born civil servant, business manager and composer who worked in England, Australia and India.

Born in England, Henslowe was the son of Edward Prentis Henslowe (1772–1857) and Cecilia Maria Barthelemon. In 1839, he emigrated to Sydney, then moved in 1841 to Hobart in Tasmania.

In Tasmania, Henslowe was appointed private secretary to Sir John Franklin and then became the Police Magistrate at Campbell Town, Tasmania in 1843. In 1851, Henslowe was appointed Clerk of the Executive and Legislative Councils of the Parliament of Tasmania. As described by a contemporary. "from his amiable and obliging disposition secured the esteem of the members of the House." Henslowe retired from his government post due to bad health and weak eyesight in 1864.

Henslowe then moved to the Madras area of India, where he worked as the manager of a large irrigation company. He held this job for ten years with a salary of 1,500 pounds a year. Around 1874, Henslowe returned to England, where he retired permanently.

Henslowe died in England in 1878.

Henslowe married the daughter of Canon Allwood, a resident of New South Wales. The couple had two sons and two daughters. Both sons held appointments in the Madras Survey Department.
