= Philip Bračanin =

Australian composer and musicologist

Philip Bračanin (born 26 May 1942) is an Australian composer and musicologist.

== Life ==
Bračanin was born in Kalgoorlie, the son of Croatian immigrants. His early musical studies were with Miss Olive Ruane, and he graduated from the University of Western Australia in 1962 with bachelor's degrees in mathematics and music. He pursued graduate studies at the same school in musicology specialising in analysis of 20th-century music, earning an MA in 1968 and a PhD in 1970. His master's thesis was on the music of Mátyás Seiber and his doctorate thesis (The Thematic Process in Dodecaphonic Music - An Analytical Study) was on the music of Anton Webern. From 1970 to 2008 he served on the staff of the University of Queensland. For 9 years he was Dean of the Faculty of Music and 10 years Head of the School of Music and is now emeritus Professor. Professor Bracanin served on the boards of the Australian Music Centre, Queensland Philharmonic Orchestra, Queensland Symphony Orchestra and 4MBS Classic Radio.

Bračanin initially began composing music in the 1970s for the purposes of creating music that would more effectively teach his students salient aspects of twentieth century compositional techniques. He eventually became interested in creating more serious compositions for their own sake, with his 1977 Trombone Concerto being now regarded as his first mature work. He has since produced a considerable body of music, including symphonic works, choral works, chamber music, and pieces for solo piano. Many works by Bračanin are published by the Australian Music Centre. He has occasionally been musically inspired by the Dalmatian Croatian musical heritage of his forebears. In 1988 Bračanin was composer in residence at the Anglo-Australian Music Festival in Birmingham, England. In 1991, he fulfilled a similar role at the Bournemouth International Festival, at which two of his works were performed, including a festival commission. In 1995 his Guitar Concerto won the APRA Award for the best Australian Classical Composition. In 2014 he was composer in residence for the Rottingdean Spring Music Festival at which the oboe concerto, Shades of Autumn, was premiered.

== Selected works ==
=== Orchestral ===
- With and Without (1975)
- Heterophony (1979)
- Rondellus Suite for string orchestra (1980)
- Sinfonia Mescolanza (1982)
- Concerto for Orchestra (1985)
- Concerto for Orchestra No. 2 (1987)
- Muzika za viganj (1989)
- Dance Poem for chamber orchestra (1990)
- Elysian Voyage for string orchestra (1992)
- Dance Tableaus (1993)
- Symphony No. 1 (1994)
- Symphony No. 2 for soprano, mixed chorus and orchestra (1994); words by Judith Wright and W. H. Auden
- Symphony No. 3 (1995)
- Windmills of Time for string orchestra (2000)
- Clocktower (2002)
- University of Queensland Processional (2003)
- Symphony No. 4 (2006)
- St. Lucia Suite for string orchestra (2007)
- Symphony No.5 (2018)
- Symphony No.6 (2018)
- Symphony No.7 (2018)
- Symphony No.8 (2019)
- Symphony No.9 (2019)
- Symphony No.10 (2020)
- Symphony No.11 (2021)
- Symphony No.12 (2022)

=== Wind ensemble ===
- Spiral Resonance for symphonic wind band (1999)

=== Concertante ===
- Concerto for trombone and orchestra (1977)
- Concerto for piano and orchestra (1980)
- Concertino for piano and string orchestra (1983)
- Concerto for violin and orchestra (1983)
- Concerto for clarinet and orchestra (1985)
- Concerto for cello and orchestra (1989)
- Concerto for oboe and string orchestra (1989)
- Concerto for viola and orchestra (1990)
- Concerto for guitar and chamber orchestra (1991; premiered 1992 by Karin Schaupp)
- Dance Gundah for orchestra with solo didjeridu (1998)
- Concertino for trombone and orchestra (1999)
- Blackwood River Concerto, Double Concerto for guitar, marimba (or vibraphone) and orchestra (2002, revised 2022))
- Shades of Autumn, Concerto for oboe and chamber orchestra (2003)
- Shades of Autumn, Concerto for oboe and string orchestra (2014, revised 2022)
- Shadows of Time, Double Concerto for oboe, guitar and chamber orchestra (2005)

=== Chamber music ===
- String Quartet (1971)
- Suite for trombone and piano (1976)
- Three Pieces for violin and piano (1976)
- Forpasis for wind sextet (1977)
- Tre affetti musicali, Duo for flute and guitar (1989)
- Of Thoughts Unspoken, Quartet for clarinet, viola, cello and piano (1996)
- Thoughts Feelings Actions for guitar solo (1997)
- Midsummer Nights' Music, Suite for 3 guitars (1999)
- Under Yaraandoo for guitar, didjeridu and percussion (4 performers) (1999)
- String Quartet No. 3 (2000)
- Blackwood River Suite for guitar and string quartet (2001)
- KL Sojourn for string quartet (2004)
- Four Bagatelles or guitar solo
- Four Diversions for guitar
- Mesco Lanza for cello and piano

=== Piano ===
- Al ma'luma (1976)
- Three Pieces

=== Vocal ===
- Selections from the Rubaiyat of Omar Khayyam for mixed chorus and string orchestra (1976)
- From the Roundabout Singing Garden for mixed chorus and string orchestra (1976); text by C.J. Dennis
- Because We Have No Time, Song Cycle for baritone and orchestra (1981); poems from Dylan Thomas and W. H. Auden

1. The Force That through the Green Fuse Drives the Flower
2. And Death Shall Have No Dominion
3. One Circumlocution
4. No Time
5. Our Bias
6. Another Time

- A Woman's Question, Song Cycle for soprano and pianoforte (1982)
- A Quiet Quick Catch of the Breath, Song Cycle for 2 sopranos, alto, tenor, 2 basses (1986); poetry by Michael Thwaites
- Throw Me a Heaven around a Child, Song Cycle for baritone and orchestra (1986)
- No Further Need, 2 Two-part Songs for female voices; poetry by Michael Thwaites
- Eternal Image for soprano, clarinet, horn and piano (1998)
