= Hugo Alpen =

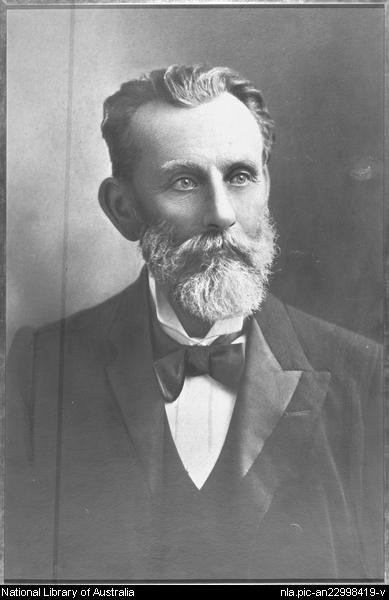
- Hugo Alpen, 1890s

Background information
- Born: October 26, 1842; Kellinghusen, Schleswig-Holstein, Germany
- Died: June 20, 1917 (aged 74)
- Occupations: Composer, Conductor, Teacher
- Years active: 1862–1917

Hugo Alpen (26 October 1842 – 20 June 1917) was a German-born Australian composer, choral conductor and singing teacher.

== Early life ==
Born on 26 October 1842 in Kellinghusen, (then part of Denmark), Alpen came to Australia in 1858 at the age of 16.

== Career ==
After spending several years in Melbourne, Alpen was appointed director of the Vocal Philharmonic Society in the New South Wales town of Tumut in 1862, and from 1865 was based in Albury. He moved to Sydney in 1880 to work as a singing master for the newly established Department of Public Instruction (now the Department of Education), teaching at Fort Street and Hurlstone teacher training colleges. In 1884 he was appointed Superintendent of Music in the department.

He advocated enlightened modern methods of music teaching for school children, emphasising aural development and sight-singing, and in 1897 he published a treatise, Practical Hints for the Teaching of Vocal Music in Public Schools.

In the earliest precursors of today's Schools Spectaculars, Alpen led massed student choirs in gala performances, often including his own compositions. His Commemoration Ode (1899) celebrated Fort Street School's Golden Jubilee. At the celebrations of the Inauguration of the Commonwealth in Centennial Park on 1 January 1901, he conducted an estimated 10,000 school children in a performance of his work Federated Australia.

Alpen was also the organist at St Patrick's on Church Hill and St Benedict's on Broadway, both in Sydney.

Among his later works, with words by Roderick Quinn, was Hail! Men of America, Hail!, which was performed as an "ode of welcome to the American Fleet" on its hugely popular first visit to Sydney Harbour in 1908.

== Death ==
In retirement he lived in Strathfield until his death on 20 June 1917.

== Bibliography ==
- Deborah Crisp, 'Amateurs and Professionals: A Snapshot of Musical Life in a Country Town, 1860–1865', Australasian Music Research, no 1, 1996. ISSN 1325-5266
- John Whiteoak and Aline Scott-Maxwell, (eds), Currency Companion to Music and Dance in Australia, Currency Press, Sydney, 2003, pp. 154, 166, 176, 547, 571 ISBN 0-9581213-1-1
This Wikipedia article is substantially built upon the essay "Alpen, Hugo" in the Dictionary of Sydney
written by Graeme Skinner, 2008 and licensed under CC by-sa. Imported on 8 August 2010.
