= Guglielmo Enrico Lardelli =

Guglielmo Enrico Lardelli (12 May 1857 – 7 July 1910) was an Italian Australian who migrated from Britain as a teenager and composed hundreds of works. He is best remembered for baroque styled Toccatina and modern works Dolce Plainte (Sweet Complaint). Lardelli's Russian Love Song has been revived at the BBC proms.

== Works ==
- 1890 Annette gavotte
- 1913 Nocturne in G flat
- Mina Valse
- Toccatina
- Sailing Polka
- Magnificat and Nunc Dimittis
- Beside The Sea
- Sardonyx polka
- Mazurka caprice
