= Mona McBurney =

British-Australian pianist and composer (1862–1932)

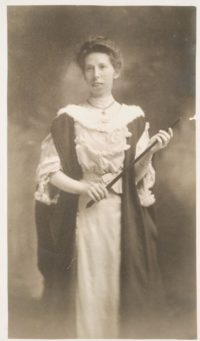
McBurney in 1898

Mona Margaret McBurney (29 July 1862 – 4 December 1932) was a British pianist, teacher and composer who lived and worked in Australia.

== Life ==
Mona McBurney was born in Douglas, Isle of Man, the youngest of six children of teacher and scholar Isaiah McBurney and art and music teacher Margaret McBurney. Mona studied music in Edinburgh with Sir Alexander Mackenzie, who was later a principal of the Royal Academy of Music.

The family emigrated to Victoria, Australia, in 1881, and settled in Geelong. McBurney attended the Ladies' College where her brother Samuel was principal and the University of Melbourne in 1881. In 1892 she continued her studies at the University of Melbourne as a music student with G.W.L. Marshall-Hall, graduating in 1896.

After ending her studies, McBurney worked as a composer and educator. In 1907 she conducted a women's orchestra in her Northern Ballad which was a commission for the Australian Exhibition of Women's Work which took place over five weeks in Melbourne. In 1918 she took a position as an Italian and French teacher at the University of Melbourne Conservatorium, and in 1921 a position as Italian teacher at the Albert Street Conservatorium, working in both positions until her death in 1932.

McBurney was active in literary and music societies and in providing venues for young musicians and composers. She never married and died of pneumonia in Hawthorn, Melbourne.

== Works ==
McBurney composed an opera, a concerto for piano and orchestra, a string quartet, two choral odes, a number of piano works and about thirty songs. Selected works include:

- "Ode to Dante", 1902
- The Dalmatian, opera, libretto adapted from a popular novel by F. Marion Crawford, Marietta: A Maid of Venice, 1910.
- "Northern Ballad" for orchestra, 1907
- String Quartette in G Minor
- "Bardic Ode from Ossian"
- "Persian Song of Spring" with 14th century lyrics by Hafiz
- "To My Friends the Birds"
- "O Bella Italia, addio"
- "Shrine of Remembrance"
- "Waldtraut's Song" from Der wilde Jager by Julius Wolff
- "An Elizabethan Madrigal"
- "A mes amis, les oiseaux" with lyrics by Jean Jacques Rousseau
- "Chansonnette" on fifteen century French verse
- "Song on May Morning" 78 rpm recording title 169939 at National Film Sound Archive
- "Gavotte"
