= Miska Hauser =

Austrian composer and musician (1822–1887)

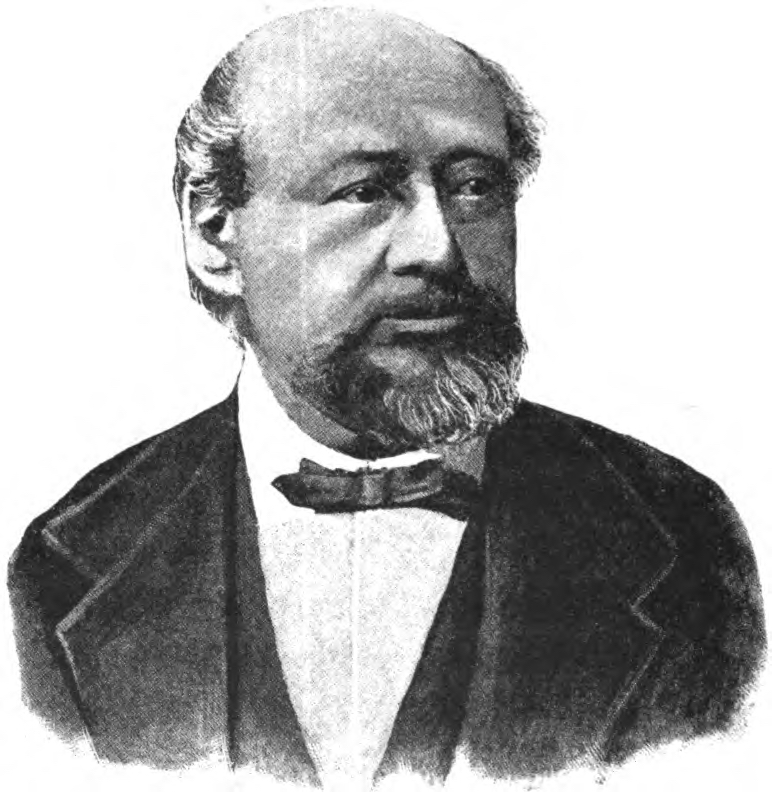

Miska Hauser (1822 – 8 December 1887) was an Austrian violinist. He undertook extensive concert tours, playing in Europe, North and South America, and Australia. He was also a composer.

== Life ==
Hauser was born in 1822, in Pressburg (now Bratislava), and his musical ability was soon recognised by his father, an amateur musician. From 1835 he studied at Vienna Conservatory, where his teachers were Joseph Böhm, Joseph Mayseder, Simon Sechter and Conradin Kreutzer.

In 1840, he toured Germany, giving concerts; from 1842 he toured Denmark, Sweden, Norway and Russia, playing in the courts of Hanover, Copenhagen. Stockholm and St Petersburg, and returning to Vienna in 1848. In 1850, he travelled to England and performed in London; from there he travelled to the United States, then to Peru and Chile. He sailed across the Pacific in 1854 via Otaheiti, where he played before Queen Pomare of Tahiti, to Australia; he appeared in Sydney, Melbourne, Adelaide, Goulburn, Ballarat and Moreton Bay.

He returned to Vienna in 1858 after a long absence, and gave concerts in Austria. He played in Constantinople (Istanbul) in 1861, where he was introduced to the Sultan of Turkey. Further tours were to Berlin in 1864 and Cologne in 1874. He died in Vienna, on 8 December 1887, aged 64 or 65.

Hauser was also a composer, particularly of works for the violin. A Dictionary of Music and Musicians (1900) summarised: "Of his compositions, his little Lieder ohne Worte ["Songs without words"] for the violin will no doubt survive him for many years."

The composer Heinrich Reinhardt was his nephew.
