= Betty Beath =

Australian composer (born 1932)

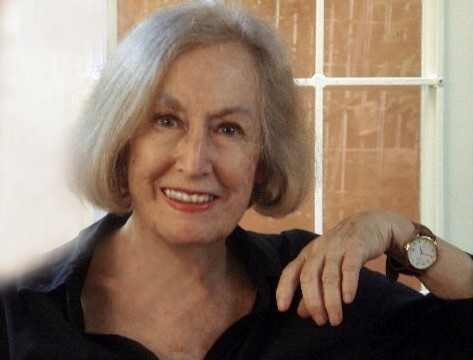

Background information
- Born: 19 November 1932 (age 93); Bundaberg, Queensland, Australia
- Occupations: composer; musician; educator
- Instrument: piano

Elizabeth Margaret Beath, née Eardley, (born 19 November 1932) is an Australian composer, pianist, and music educator.

== Life and career ==
Betty Beath was born in Bundaberg, Queensland, and began piano lessons at the age of three. She was twice a finalist in the ABC Concerto competition when in her teens. In 1950, she was awarded a University of Queensland Music Scholarship, which took her to study under the composer and pianist Frank Hutchens at the Sydney Conservatorium of Music and also at the Queensland Conservatorium, with Max Olding and Janet Delpratt.

After completing her education, Beath settled in Brisbane and took positions as an accompanist and later teacher at Queensland Conservatorium and was Head of Music at St. Margaret's Girls' School, Brisbane. She is an Examiner with the Australian Music Examinations Board. Beath received a Southeast Asian Fellowship from the Australia Council in 1974 to conduct research in Bali and Java. She is married to author/illustrator, David Cox.

She represented women composers of Australia at the 3rd International Congress on Women in Music, held in Mexico City in 1984. She has also been an executive member of the International League of Women Composers.

The State Library of Queensland has in its collection a digital story and oral history of Betty Beath. In this extensive interview she speaks with Laurel Dingle about her life as a music composer, performer and teacher, from her earliest memories to the present day. (1950-2014).

Her most performed music is perhaps the piano solo piece "Merindu Bali" (Bali Yearning), written for the Indonesian pianist Ananda Sukarlan and dedicated to the memory of the victims of Bali bombings of October 12, 2002. The piece uses the Balinese gamelan pentatonic scale and championed worldwide by Ananda Sukarlan, and now it has been taken by other pianists.

== Works ==
Beath sometimes incorporates world music themes into her compositions, including music from Bali and Java. Selected works include:

=== Orchestral ===
- Asmaradana (1994), for Tasmanian Symphony Orchestra. First performance Taman Ismail Marzuki, Jakarta,18/6/1994.
- Journeys - an Indonesian triptych (1994), Commissioned by the Queensland Philharmonic Orchestra.
- Dreams and visions (1996), Commissioned by the Queensland Symphony Orchestra.
- Woman's song: Allegro Vivace for Strings,(1999). Published by Wirripang.
- Lament for Kosovo: Adagio for Strings, (1999). Published by Wirripang.
- Lagu lagu manis (1994)

=== Soloist with orchestra ===
- In this garden (1973).
- Riddles (1974) a cycle of four songs for Voice and Orchestra. 1. The Cry 2. In An English Garden 3. In Spanish Mountains 4. In the Carnarvon Ranges.
- From a Quiet Place, 3 Pieces for viola and piano (1997)
- Mikri Thalassa for 2 mandolins, mandola and guitar
- Adagio for Strings: Lament for Kosovo
- Towards the Psalms, settings of texts from the novel Fugitive Pieces by Anne Michaels
- Merindu Bali, for piano (written for the Indonesian pianist / composer Ananda Sukarlan
- River Songs for soprano with ensemble
- Abigail and the Bushranger with David Cox
- Abigail and the Rainmaker for treble choir with piano
- Lagu lagu Manis II for chamber orchestra
- Heart song for solo cello
- Poverello: St. Francis of Assisi, a Saint for Our Times

== Recordings ==
Music of Betty Beath recorded and issued on CD includes:

- 'Music of Betty Beath' 2010 Wirripang, Wirr024
- 'Betty Beath, Journeys of the Mind' 2/10/2011, Beath-Cox Art Enterprises CD BC02
- 'Music in Bali and Java, Betty Beath & David Cox', 1/9/2011, Beath-Cox Art Enterprises CD BC01
- 'Splendour of the Past, Music of Australian Composers', 27/1/1991. JAD CD 1025
- 'River Songs' 29 February 1992. JAD CD1026
- 'Poetic Nostalgia' 7/7/1992. JAD CD1029
- Still Life (25 October 2003). Tall Poppies, TP162
- 'Music From Six Continents, 1995 Series.' Vienna Modern Masters VMM3031
- 'New Music for Orchestra...Music From Six Continents, 1996 Series. Vienna Modern Masters VMM3036
- 'Symphony, Music of Australian Composers', 15/3/1993. JAD CD1037
- 'New Music for Orchestra...Music From Six Continents, 1997 Series. Vienna Modern Masters VMM3039
- 'In This Garden', 18/1/94. JAD CD1044
- 'Music from Six Continents, 2001 Series.' Vienna Modern Masters VMM 3052
- 'Music From Six Continents, 2001 Series.' Vienna Modern Masters VMM 3053
- 'Music for a Candlelight Dinner', 26/2/1996. JAD CD1058
- 'Procession for Elizabeth, Music of Australian Composers' 17/9/1998. JAD CD1079
- 'Shade of Summer, Music of Australian Composers', 28/10/1992. JAD CD1032
- 'Music From The Fellowship of Australian Composers', 9/3/1993. JAD CD1036
- 'Water Colours, Music of the Australian Composers', 5/10/1993. JAD CD1041
- 'Tales from Nowhere, Music of the Australian Composers', 8/2/1994. JAD CD1046
- 'Music for a Festive Occasion, Music of Australian Composers', 15/3/1994. JAD CD1048
- 'Best of Jade Classics, Music of the Australian Composers', 5/10/1995. JAD CD1056
- 'American Dream, Music of American and Australian Composers', 11/1/2001. JAD CD1090
- 'The Original Music For A Champagne Breakfast, Australian Composers', 4/6/1999. JAD CD1085
- 'Winter Solstice, Music of Australian Composers', 18/1/2006. JAD CD1108
- 'Reflections Through A Stained Glass Window', 29/8/2006. JAD CD1110
- 'Sonata Piccola, Music of Australian Composers's, 31/10/2006. JAD CD1111
- 'Forever Sunset,' Celebrating the 100th disc in the Jade Series of Australian Composers. 16/10/2007. JAD CD1116
- 'Un-ruffled, Australian Viola, French Horn, Double Bass & Bassoon Music', 2004. Fellowship of Australian Composers FAC CD3
