= Linda Thompson (artistic director) =

Australian operatic soprano, producer and stage director

Linda Joy Thompson AM is an Australian operatic soprano, producer and stage director. Thompson performed 25 principal operatic roles, including two world premieres at the Sydney Opera House with the Australian Opera. Thompson was head of Classical Voice department at the Monash University Faculty of Arts from 2001 until 2008, before founding the Opera Studio Melbourne (now Australian Contemporary Opera Company) in 2008. In 2015, Thompson founded Australia's only regional international opera festival, held annually in the Yarra Valley since 2017.

== Career ==
Thompson began her professional performing career co-producing and starring in a 1990 production of Malcolm Williamson's The Growing Castle directed by Barrie Kosky, followed by Kosky's staged version of Handel's Belshazzar in the role of Nitocris, for which Thompson received a Green Room Award nomination for Best Female Principal Artist in Opera. Thompson joined the Victoria State Opera as a Young Artist in 1990, and moved to Sydney to join the Australian Opera in 1991. Thompson created the principal soprano roles in two world premieres of new Australian operas: Clare Clairmont in Mer de glace, with music by Richard Meale and libretto by David Malouf. The production was directed by Simon Phillips, and premiered at the Sydney Opera House in 1991. In 1992, Thompson took the leading principal role in Larry Sitsky's The Golem, with libretto by Gwen Harwood. The production was directed by Barrie Kosky, and opened at the Sydney Opera House in1993. Thompson sang Helena in the original cast of Australian director Baz Luhrmann's A Midsummer Night's Dream (Benjamin Britten), designed by Catherine Martin for Opera Australia in 1993.

From 1994, Thompson was sessional lecturer at the Victorian College of the Arts and the Faculty of Music/Conservatorium at the University of Melbourne, then head of Classical Voice at Monash University from 2001 until 2008, where she founded the Monash Opera Ensemble. In late 2008, Thompson founded Gertrude Opera (now Australian Contemporary Opera Company) as a repertory opera company for the development of young opera artists and as a vehicle for contemporary opera production. In 2013, Thompson re-joined Opera Australia as a freelance principal soprano, covering the role of Sieglinde in Wagner's Die Walküre and Dritte Norn in Götterdämmerung as part of the company's first Der Ring des Nibelungen cycle in Melbourne.

Since 2009, as artistic director and CEO of Australian Contemporary Opera Company (formerly Gertrude Opera), Thompson has produced more than 12 Australian premiere productions, 40 new opera productions, and provided a performance platform for 120 young operatic artists. Thompson is founder/artistic director of Australia's only international opera festival – in Nagambie Lakes (2015–2016) and Yarra Valley (2017–2019). and online (2020)

== Awards and achievements ==
Thompson was winner of the Herald Sun Aria competition (1990), the Dame Mabel Brookes Fellowship (1990) and Lady Persia Galleghan Award (1990) – Opera Foundation Australia, Victorian winner of the ABC Instrumental and Vocal Competition, and runner-up in the Metropolitan Opera Auditions regional final. In 1989, Thompson received a Green Room Award nomination for Principal Soprano (Nitocris, Handel's Belshazzar – Treason of Images Company).

Thompson researched Australian art song, culminating in the release of Repose – Lullabies and Cradle Songs by Australian composers on the MOVE Records label in 1999. In February 2001, Thompson was appointed head of Classical Voice at Monash University. In 2001, she created the Monash Opera Ensemble, and in 2008 founded the Opera Studio Melbourne (now Australian Contemporary Opera Company).

Thompson received Opera Chaser Awards for Outstanding Director and Outstanding Production by an Independent Company for the Australian premiere season of The Handmaid's Tale by Danish composer Sir Poul Ruders, with libretto by Paul Bentley (UK), at the Yarra Valley Opera Festival in 2018. Thompson followed up with the Opera Chaser Award for Outstanding Production by an Independent Company for The Enchanted Pig directed by Gale Edwards with costume design by Oscar-winner Tim Chappel at Gertrude Opera's Yarra Valley Opera Festival in 2019.

In October 2022, Thompson was inducted into the Victorian Honour Roll of Women – recognition for women who have demonstrated remarkable leadership and excellence in their field of expertise.

In the 2025 King's Birthday Honours, Thompson was appointed a Member of the Order of Australia, for significant service to the performing arts, particularly to opera.

== Selected works ==
A selection of the works that Thompson has premiered in Australia, as producer, director and/or performer:

Year	Work	Composer/librettist	Role
1989	The Growing Castle	Malcolm Williamson (composer)	performer (Agnes), co-producer
1991	Mer de glace	Richard Meale (composer) David Malouf (libretto)	performer (Clare Clairmont)
1992	The Golem	Larry Sitsky (composer) Gwen Harwood (libretto)	performer (Rachel)
2015	the difficulty of crossing a field	David Lang (composer) Mac Wellman (libretto)	artistic director, producer
2016	To Hell and Back	Jake Heggie (composer) Gene Scheer (libretto)	artistic director, producer
2016	M*cBeth (Macbeth)	Verdi, arr. Peter Stopschinski, co-production Monk Parrots, New York City	performer (Lady Macbeth), producer
2018	The Handmaid's Tale	Poul Ruders (composer) Paul Bentley (libretto)	stage director, producer
2019	The Enchanted Pig	Jonathan Dove (composer) Alasdair Middleton (libretto)	artistic director, producer
2020	As One	Laura Kaminsky (composer) Kimberly Reed/Mark Campbell (libretto)	stage director, producer

== Discography ==
Year	Title	Description	Artists	Label
1992	The Golem	Larry Sitsky (composer) Gwen Harwood (libretto)	Australian Opera	ABC Classics
1999	Repose'	Lullabies & Cradle Songs by Australian Composers 1999	Linda Thompson, soprano Deviani Segal, piano	Move Records
2008	Songs for Voice & Violin	Rebecca Clarke, Vaughan Williams & Gustav Holst	Linda Thompson, soprano; Fintan Murphy, violin	Resplendent Records
