= Peter Hemmings =

British opera administrator (1934–2002)

Peter Hemmings OBE (10 April 1934 – 4 January 2002) was an English opera administrator, impresario and singer.

As a singer, he was an accomplished chorister in his youth and had a fine bass voice. He was educated at Mill Hill School and began his administrative career as president of the Cambridge University Opera Group. That company's success led to the founding of the New Opera Company in 1957 with Hemmings as general manager. In 1966, he became the chief administrator of Scottish Opera, a position he held for almost 20 years. In 1977, he followed John Winther as general manager of the Australian Opera, but clashed with the music director, Richard Bonynge. In that time his most significant contribution to opera in Australia was the commissioning of the opera Voss from Richard Meale. Later, he managed the London Symphony Orchestra for four years, then accepted a position as the general director of the Los Angeles Opera in 1984. He was married to Jane (née Kearns), and he had two daughters, two sons and one stepdaughter. He remained the company's general director until he returned to the UK in 2000 to take up a position on the board of the Royal Opera.
