= Mer de Glace ice cave =

Artificial ice cave in France

- Grotte de glace de la Mer de Glace
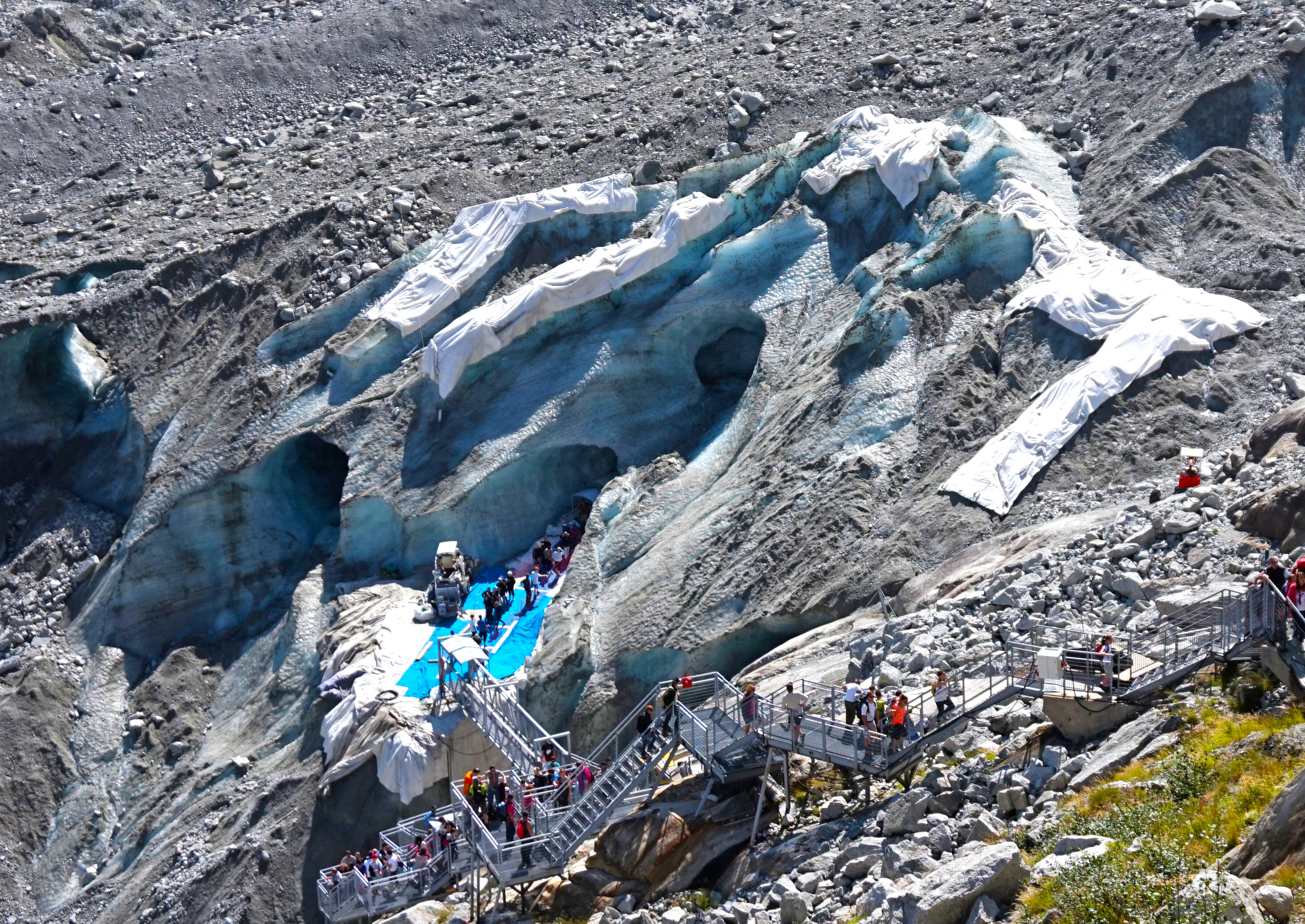
- Mer de Glace cave entry from the Montenvers bridge, 2015

- Location within France
- Location: Chamonix, Auvergne-Rhône-Alpes, France
- Coordinates: 45°55′44″N 6°55′21″E
- Elevation: 1,760 metres
- Geology: Ice
- Show cave opened: 1863
- Visitors: 350,000 (2015)
- Website: Official website

The Mer de Glace ice cave (French: Grotte de glace de la Mer de Glace) is an artificial ice cave in the French department of Haute-Savoie, on the Mont Blanc massif of the French Alps. The cave, which is situated within the Chamonix valley, on the Mer de Glace glacier, has been dug out every year since the middle of the 19th century. This annual renewal is made necessary by the flow of the glacier it sits on. Mer de Glace welcomes approximately 350,000 visitors per year.

== History ==
=== Precursors ===
Before the cave's creation, one of the main attractions for tourists visiting the Chamonix valley was the 20–30 metre-high arch formed by the Arveyron river as it emerged from the Mer de Glace glacier. However, some years, the arch failed to form or collapsed.

In 1862, a foreign builder proposed to create an artistic grotto based on the gallery dug for visitors in the Lower Grindelwald Glacier. The residents of Chamonix decided to build the cave themselves, however, and after considering developing the Arveyron arch, they ultimately opted for a less dangerous solution—the complete digging on its right flank of a 25-metre gallery leading to a rotunda. At its entrance, they built a chalet for visitors and to sell souvenirs.

The initial cave, which stood from the beginning of April until the end of June 1863, enjoyed great success. At the time, it was called "Crystal Cave" or "Crystal Palace". During this period, the Mer de Glace descended to the bottom of the valley and was called Glacier des Bois, after the village where it ended and where the cave was located. However, the glacier was in a phase of rapid retreat and, from 1870 until 1871, its tip was in a more rugged area, where even the natural arch of the Arveyron no longer formed.

From 1872, the cave was dug in the Bossons Glacier and was called the Mont Blanc cave.

=== Current cave ===
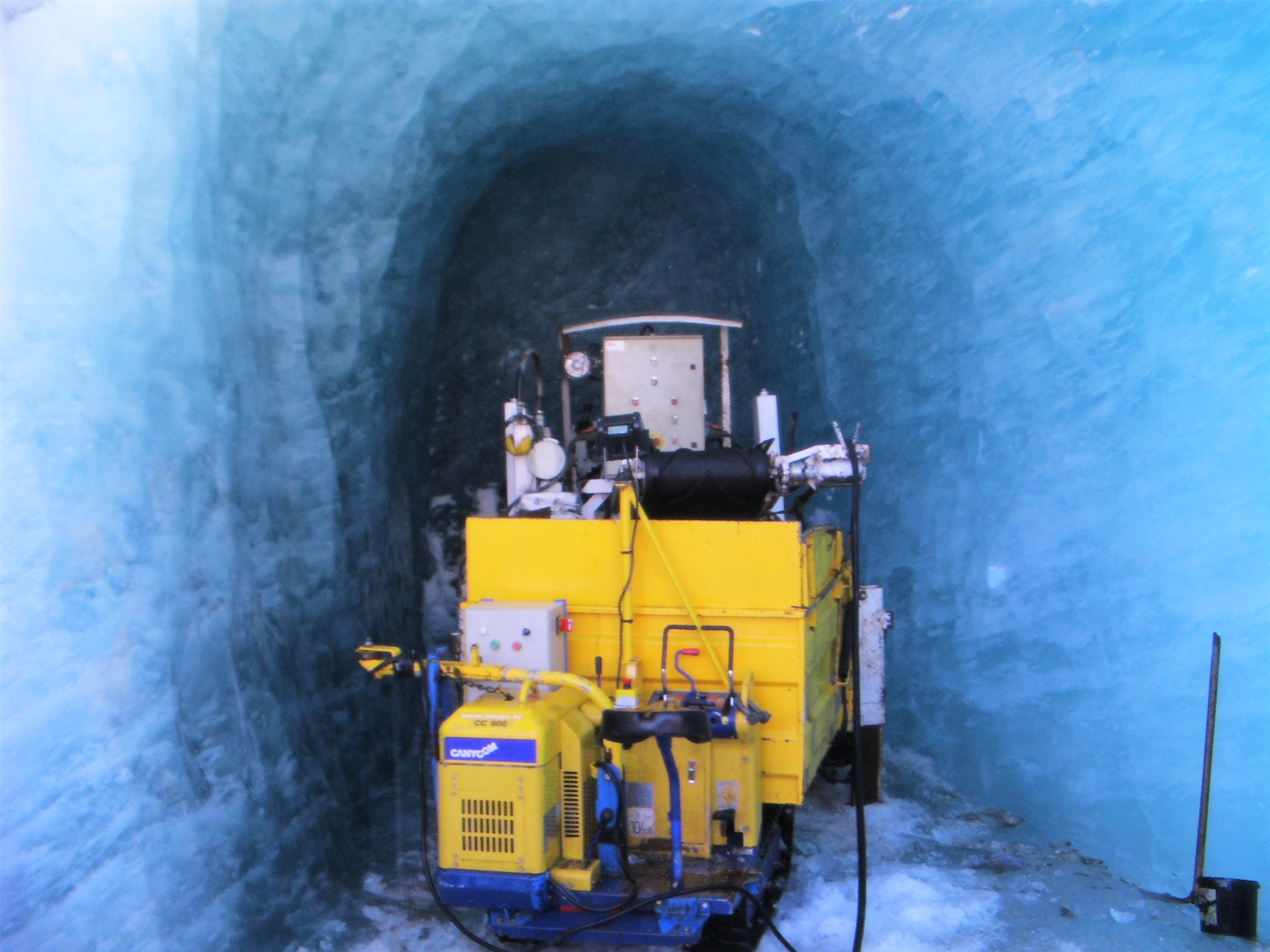
Digging machine

In the second half of the 20th century and up until the 2020s, the ice cave was dug in the Mer de Glace glacier, downstream from the Montenvers viewpoint, almost two kilometres above the original cave. Dug with a pickaxe from 1946, its layout stabilised from 1953, with branched galleries leading to rooms housing furniture and ice sculptures.

As the path leading to the cave from Montenvers was narrow and the influx of visitors became too great, a cable car was built in 1961 to secure access from the railway station. Its initial capacity of 450 passengers per hour soon proved insufficient, and it was increased to 700 in 1972 by removing the seats. On 19 August 1987, the movement of the glacier caused the collapse of the cave's access footbridge, leading to three deaths, and the decision was made to move the lower station to a safer site. A gondola lift with a capacity of 1,200 people per hour and located just to the east of the railway terminal opened in 1988, thereby leading to the relocation of the ice cave to its current site, approximately 200 metres further north.

While the ice level had been fairly stable during the cave's first forty years of operation, the glacier began to melt rapidly from 1983 onwards, mainly due to a 1.5 °C increase in summer temperatures. It has since lost about a hundred metres in thickness, making it necessary to lengthen the staircase to 580 steps by the early 2020s. As the movement is expected to continue, with the glacier front forecast to retreat another 1,000–1,400 metres by 2040, a new location is being sought for the ice cave.

== Gallery ==
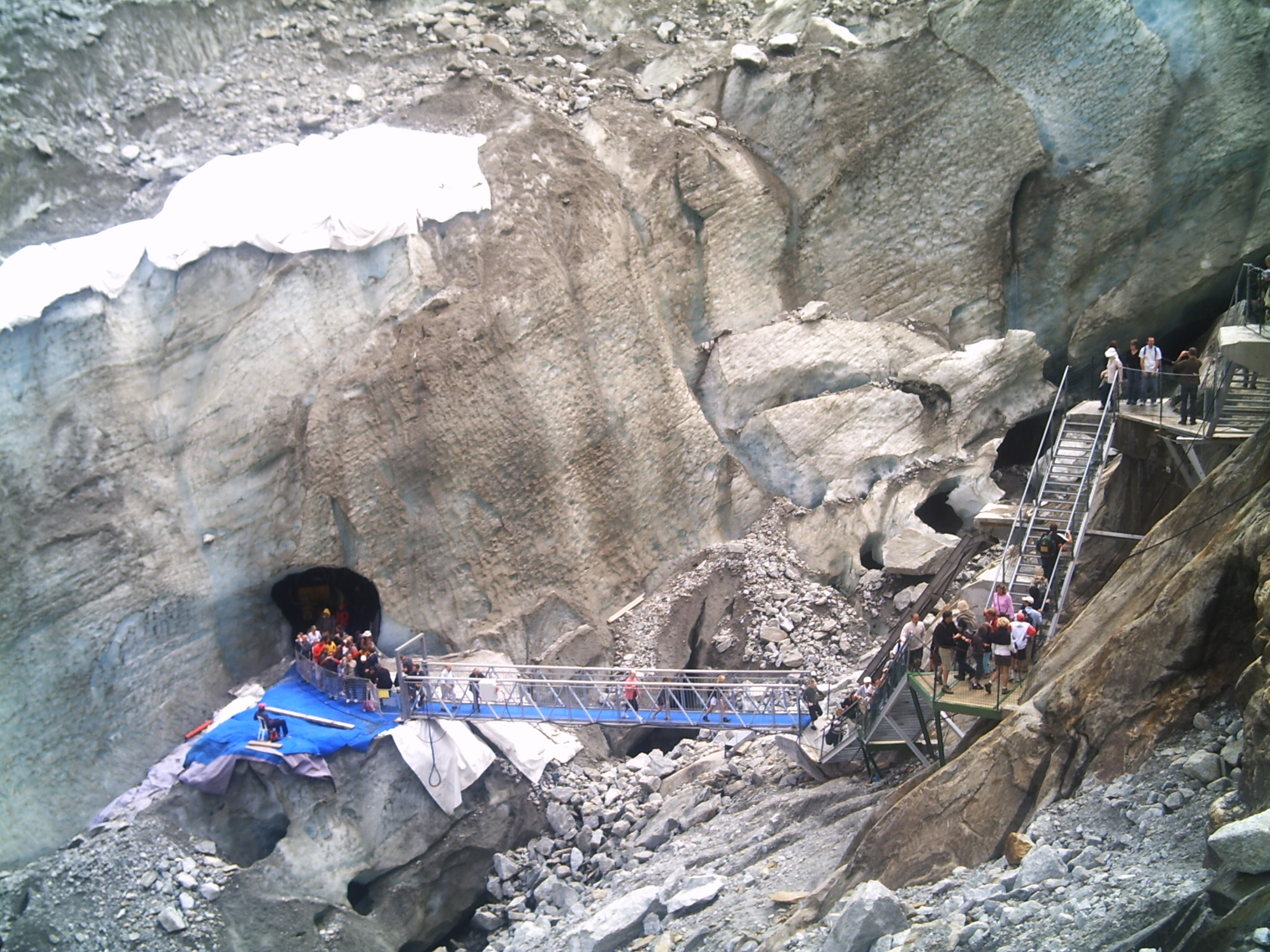
Cave entrance from the Montenvers bridge

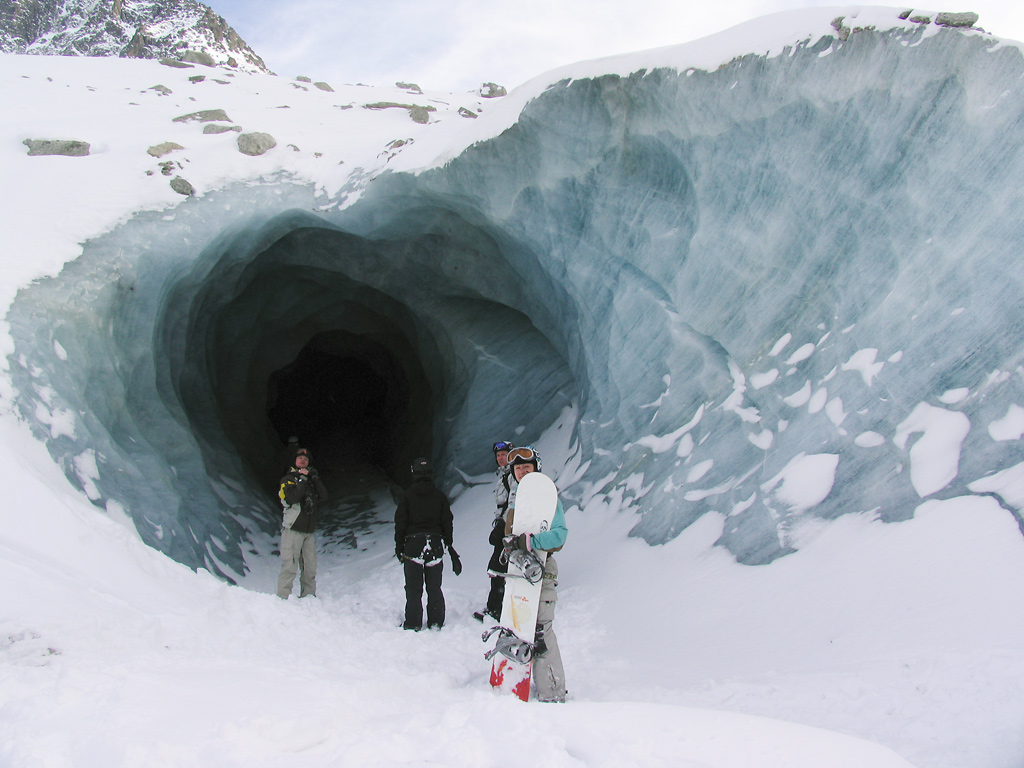
Entrance in winter

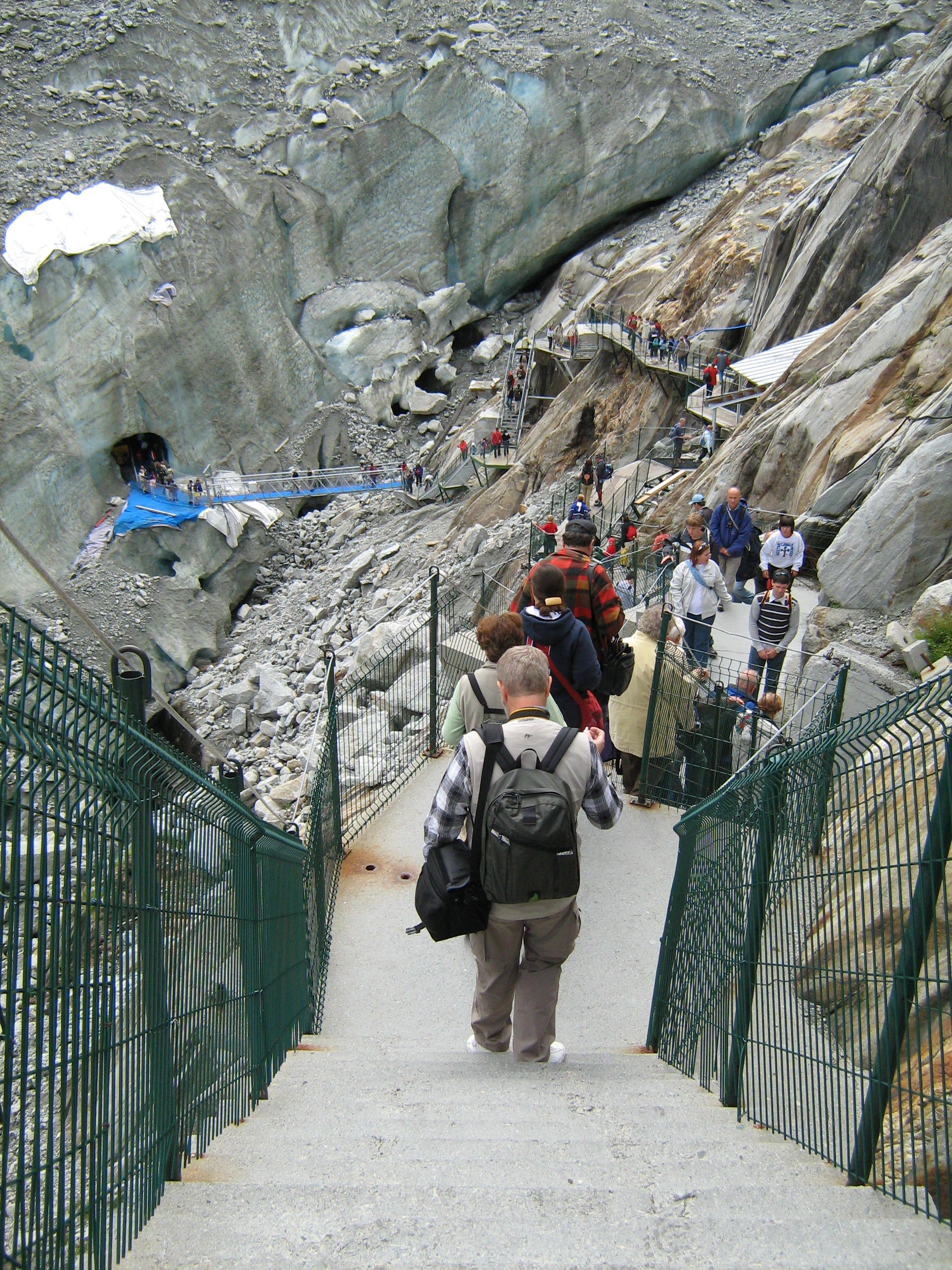
Approaching the cave on the Montenvers bridge

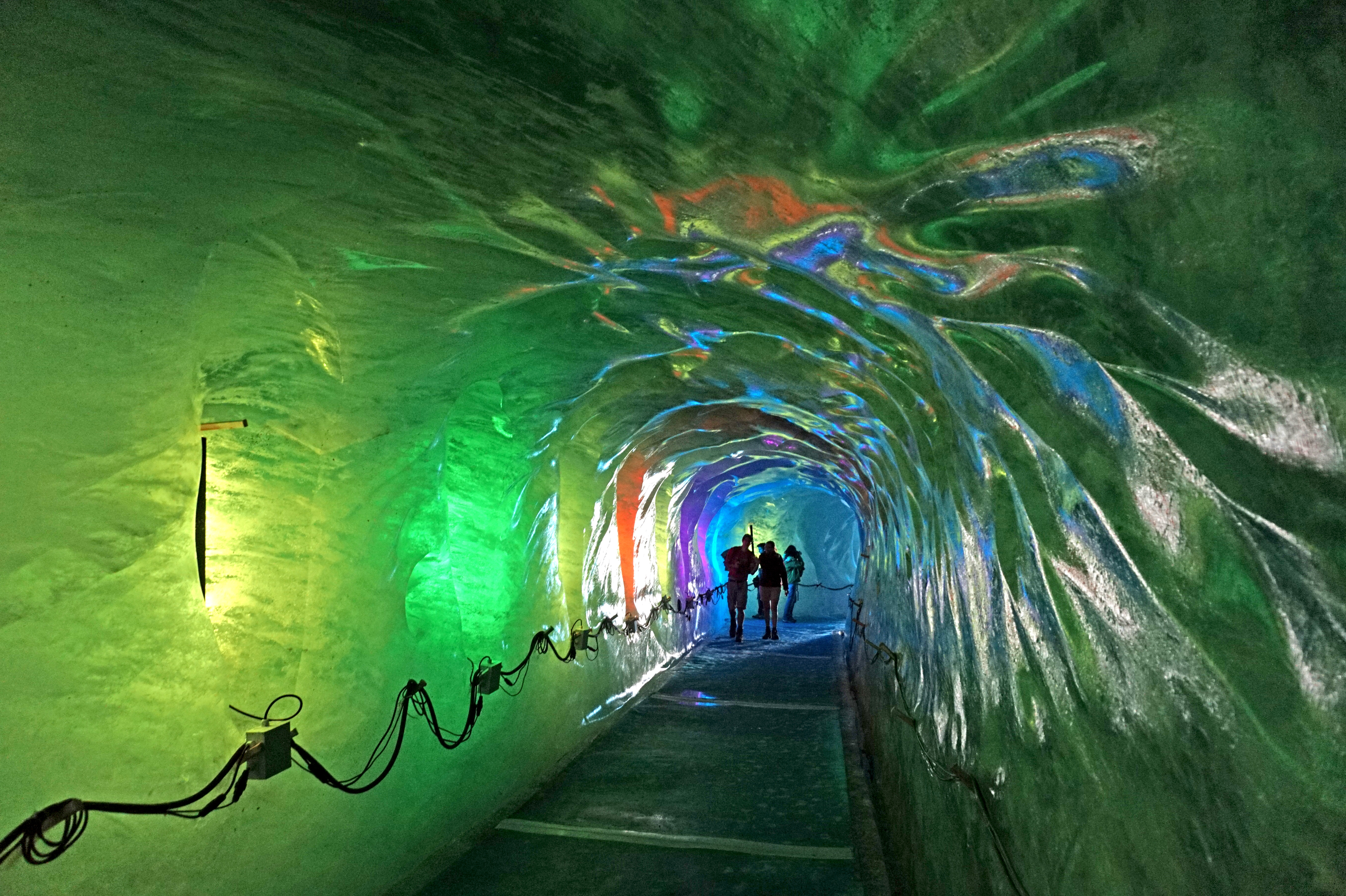
Cave interior

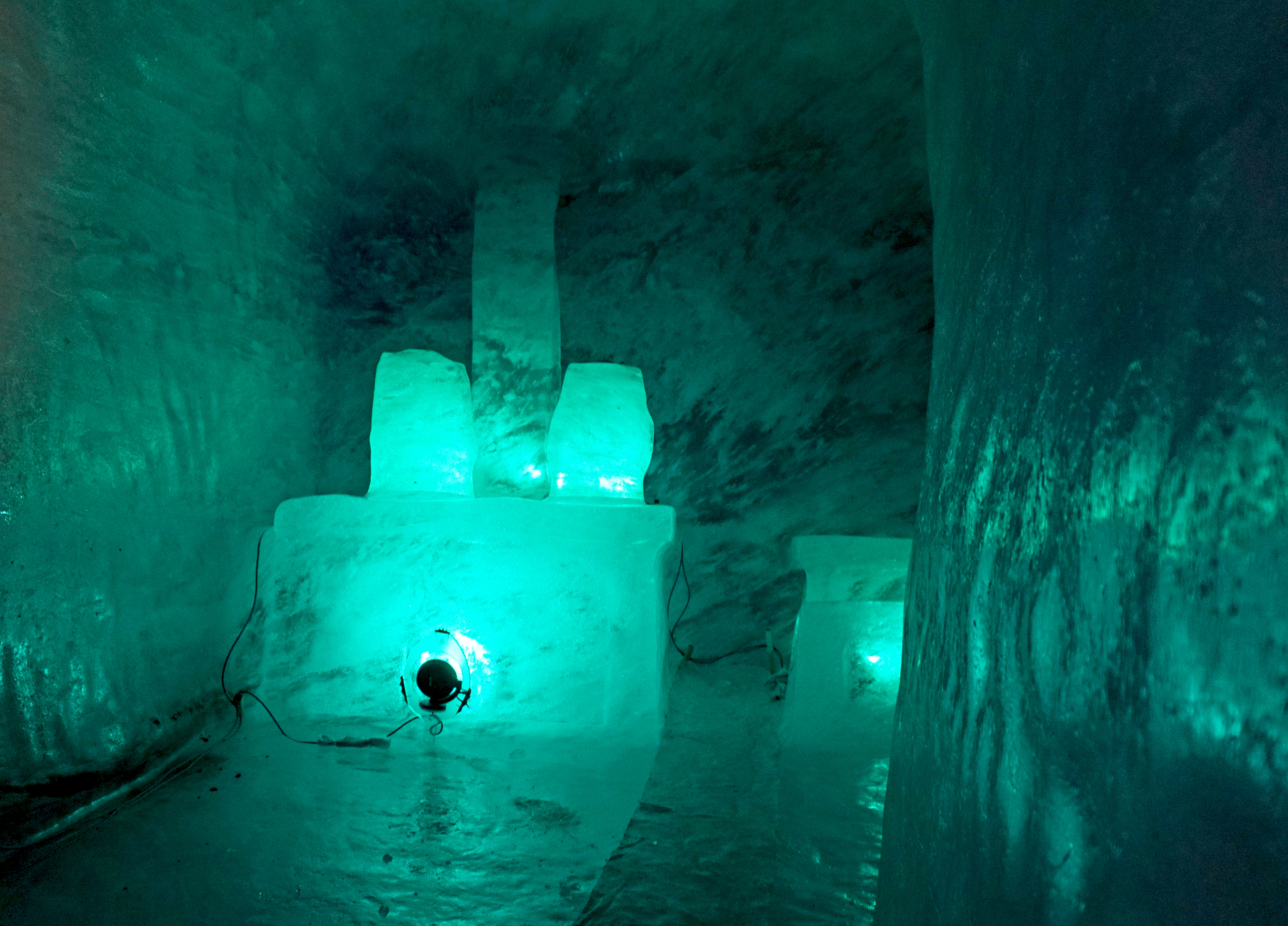
Sculpture within the cave
