= Australian Contemporary Opera Company =

The Australian Contemporary Opera Company (ACOCo) is a not-for-profit contemporary opera company, based in Melbourne, Victoria, Australia. It was formerly known as "Gertrude Opera".

== History ==
The company was established in 2008 primarily as a training repertory company for aspiring opera singers, and répétiteurs, directors and designers. It was first named "The Opera School Melbourne" and then "Gertrude Opera". Its creative staff include Linda Thompson (artistic director, 2008–present day, former Head of Classical Voice at Monash University), Brian Castles-Onion AM (board member and guest conductor). Creative teams have included Gale Edwards AM (artist in residence, 2019), costume designer Tim Chappel, Geraldine Turner AM, and Luke Leonard (Monk Parrots, USA). Conductors have included Brian Castles-Onion AM, Tianyi Lu, Patrick Burns, Benjamin Northey, Matthew Toogood, and Dr David Kram. Staff members have included Andrea Katz (inaugural head of music, 2009–2011), and Cameron Menzies (head of stage direction 2010–2013). In 2013 the Studio named its performing company "Gertrude Opera", after Gertrude Johnson incorporating the Studio stage performance program. In 2020 the company changed its name to the "Australian Contemporary Opera Company".

== Productions ==
The company's repertoire spans Australian premieres, new works, and children's/family opera. "mini-festivals" and major productions. In later years, the company has become known for Australian premieres and staging of contemporary works and treatments. In 2015 the company founded Australia's only international opera festival (Nagambie 2015, 2016, Yarra Valley 2018, 2019) International collaborators include Monk Parrots (USA) and Glyndebourne (Glyndebourne Opera Cup).

== Selective list of productions ==
Australian premiere*

- Alice's Adventures in Wonderland* (Todd/Gottlieb) 2022
- Book of Longing (Glass/Cohen) 2022
- The Loser* (David Lang) 2022
- Ariarchitecture* (Britten/Greenbaum/Menotti/Floyd) 2020
- Together, Apart* (Gentile/Hall) 2020
- Kate Kelly* (Carey/Findlay) 2020
- love fail* (David Lang) 2020-2022
- To my distant love* (Beethoven) 2020
- As One,* (Kaminsky/Campbell/Reed) 2020
- The Enchanted Pig,* (Dove/Middleton) 2019
- The Coronation of Poppea, (Monteverdi) 2019
- Macbeth, (Verdi/Stopschinski) 2019 (Yarra Valley/New York)
- The Handmaid's Tale,* (Ruders) 2018
- Cosi fan tutte, (Mozart) 2018
- The Elixir of Love, (Donizetti) 2018
- To Hell and Back,* (Heggie) 2018, 2016
- Alcina, (Handel) 2017
- The Magic Flute, (Mozart) 2017
- Doctor Miracle, (Bizet) 2017
- The Consul, (Menotti) 2017
- The Telephone, (Menotti) 2017
- First Music, then Words, (Salieri) 2017
- Thespis, (Gilbert & Sullivan) 2016
- the difficulty of crossing a field,* (Lang) 2015
- Tuesdays with Pictures,* (Williams) 2015
- Bon Appétit!,* (Hoiby) 2015
- Coffee Cantata, (Bach) (2015)
- Trial by Jury, (Gilbert & Sullivan) (2015)
- The Magic Flute, (Mozart) 2014
- The Marriage of Figaro, (abr.) (Mozart) 2014
- Cinderella, (Massenet) 2013
- The Juniper Tree,* (Glass/Moran) 2011, 2013
- Eugene Onegin, (Tchaikovsky) 2012
- Orpheus in the Underworld, (Offenbach) 2011
- Mini Opera Festival: Orpheus returns, 2011
- Loves Luggage Lost, (Rossini) 2011
- Don Giovanni, (Mozart) 2010
- The Magic Flute, (Mozart) (2009)
- The Old Maid and the Thief, (Menotti) 2009
- Hansel and Gretel, (Humperdinck) 2009
- Acis and Galatea, (Handel) 2009

== Studio - Young Artists (2009 - 2019) ==
Gertrude Opera runs an annual international Studio Young Artist program, building bridges to new audiences and a platform for professional growth.

2009	2010	2011	2012
Hadleigh Adams (NZ)	Stacey Alleaume (VIC)	Ashlyn Tymms (WA)	Blake Bowden (NSW)
Stacey Alleaume (VIC)	Sophie Yelland (SA)	Nathan Lay (VIC)	Eric Ferrer (FLP)
Kari Lyon (WA)	Cameron Lukey (NSW)	Nicholas Dinopoulos (VIC)	Li Yang (CHN)
Alison Lemoh (NSW)	Greg Eldridge (VIC)	Daniel Sinfield (WA)	Samantha Chong (HK
Mandy Lyn Brook (VIC)	Nathan Lay (VIC)	Hannah Dahlenburg (VIC)	Caitlin McNab (VIC)
Kristan Gregory (VIC)	Nicholas Dinopoulos (VIC)	Rhiannon Stevens (VIC)	Rhiannon Stephens (VIC)
Tim Jaques (VIC)	Daniel Sinfield (WA)	Joachin Quilez-Marin (ESP)	Bernard Leon (NSW)
Laura Parkes (VIC)	David Costello (WA)	Kristain Gregory (VIC)	Raphael Wong (VIC)
Jane Matheson (VIC)	Diipti Firmstone (QLD)	Caitlin McNab (VIC)	Juel Flemming (VIC)
Amy Spruce (VIC)	Rosel Labone (NZ)	Jessica Kinsella (ACT)	Alyssa Peacock (ACT)
	Timothy Jaques (VIC)	Eric Ferrer (FLP)	Emma Wheeler (UK)
	Kristain Gregory (VIC_	Li Yang (CHN)	Na'ama Goldman (ISR)
	Caitlin McNab (VIC)	Samantha Chong (HK)	
	Stephanie Falkiner (VIC)	Adam Bryce (VIC)	
	Bethany McAleer (SA)	Emma Wheeler (UK)	
	Yana Georgiou (NSW)		

2013	2014	2015	2016
Blake Bowden (NSW)	Alexandra Ioan (NZ/ROM)	Agathe de Courcy (FR)	Alexandra Ioan (NZ/ROM)
Raphael Wong (VIC)	Eugene Raggio (NSW)	Alexandra Ioan (NZ/ROM)	Allegra Giagu (NSW)
Rada Tochalna (UKR)	Alyssa Andraski (USA)	Patrick MacDevitt (USA)	Spencer Chapman (QLD)
James Penn (VIC)	Alexandra Lidgerwood (VIC)	Michelle McCarthy (VIC)	Alexandra Lidgerwood (VIC)
Yasmin Ismail (VIC)	Damien Noyce (NSW)	Alexandra Lidgerwood (VIC)	Elizabeth Chennell (UK)
Catherine Hoffman (VIC)	Rada Tochalna (UKR)	Tamzyn Alexander (VIC)	Lisa Parker (VIC)
Tamzyn Alexander (VIC)	Tamzyn Alexander (VIC)	Eugene Raggio (NSW)	Joshua Erdelyi-Götz (VIC)
Stephanie Whyte (VIC)	Blake Bowden (NSW)	Khary Wilson (USA)	Evita Pehlaka (LVA)
Heidi Lupprian (VIC)	Megan Steller (VIC)	Lisa Parker (VIC)	Samuel Thomas-Holland (QLD)
Bianca Andrew (NZ)		PIera Dennerstein (VIC)	
		Samuel Thomas-Holland (QLD)	
		Owain Browne (UK)	

2017	2018	2019	2020	2021	2022
Brigette de Poi (VIC)	Georgia Wilkinson (VIC)	Georgia Wilkinson (VIC)	Alexandra Amerides (VIC)	Alexandra Amerides (VIC)	Alexandra Amerides (VIC)
Juliet Dufour (FR)	Louise Keast (ACT)	Naomi Flatman (QLD)	Georgia Wilkinson (VIC)	Jessica Mills (SA)	Bailey Montgomerie (NSW)
Joshua Erdelyi-Götz (VIC)	Yu Lin (VIC)	Morgan Carter (SA)	Morgan Carter (VIC)	Callum Warrender (SA)	Caitlin Toohey (VIC)
Darcy Carroll (VIC)	Ella Broome (VIC)	NuoLin OuYang (CHN)	Daniel Felton (VIC)	Sandra Liu (NSW)	Callum Warrender (SA)
Lisa Parker (VIC)	Zachary McCulloch (NZ)	Sheridan Hughes (VIC)	Joshua Oxley (NSW)	Angelique Tot (VIC)	Genevieve Droppert (WA)
Shir Rozzen (ISR)	Naomi Flatman (QLD)	Joshua Oxley (NSW)	Nigel Huckle (VIC)	Leah Phillips (VIC)	Daniel Felton (VIC)
Bethany Hill (SA)	Chloe Wood (VIC)	Victoria Thomasch (USA)	Sam Ward (VIC)	Zhibang Chen (VIC)	Mitchell Sanders (VIC)
Allegra Giagu (NSW)	Juan-David Guzman (COL)	Frances Kruske (USA)	Tash Atkins (NSW)		Grace Gallur (NSW)
Elizabeth Chennell (UK)		Hannah Peel (UK)			Sandra Liu (NSW)
		Alexandra Amerides (VIC)			Madeline Nibali (VIC)
		Nigel Huckle (VIC)			Po Goh (VIC)
		Harry Grigg (NZ)			Lily Begg (VIC)
		Leo Williams (USA)			

== Awards and honours ==
- In 2018, and again in 2019, Gertrude Opera won OperaChaser's Outstanding Production by an Independent Company Award for the Australian premieres of The Handmaid's Tale (Ruders) and The Enchanted Pig (Dove).
- In 2020, a Green Room Award for Programming - a world-first online contemporary opera festival.
- In 2022, Honourable Mention at Tokyo Film Festival for love fail - a co-production with Monk Parrots USA
- In 2022, Founder and Artistic director Linda Thompson was inducted into the Victorian Honour Roll of Women

== See also ==
- National Theatre, Melbourne
