= The Handmaid's Tale (disambiguation) =

The Handmaid's Tale is a 1985 novel by Margaret Atwood, adapted into a film, an opera and a TV series:

- The Handmaid's Tale (film), 1990 American film
- The Handmaid's Tale (opera), 1990, composed by Danish composer Poul Ruders
- The Handmaid's Tale (TV series), American drama web television series

== See also ==
- The Handmaiden, a 2016 South Korean film
