= Gertrude Johnson =

Australian coloratura soprano and founder of the National Theatre in Melbourne

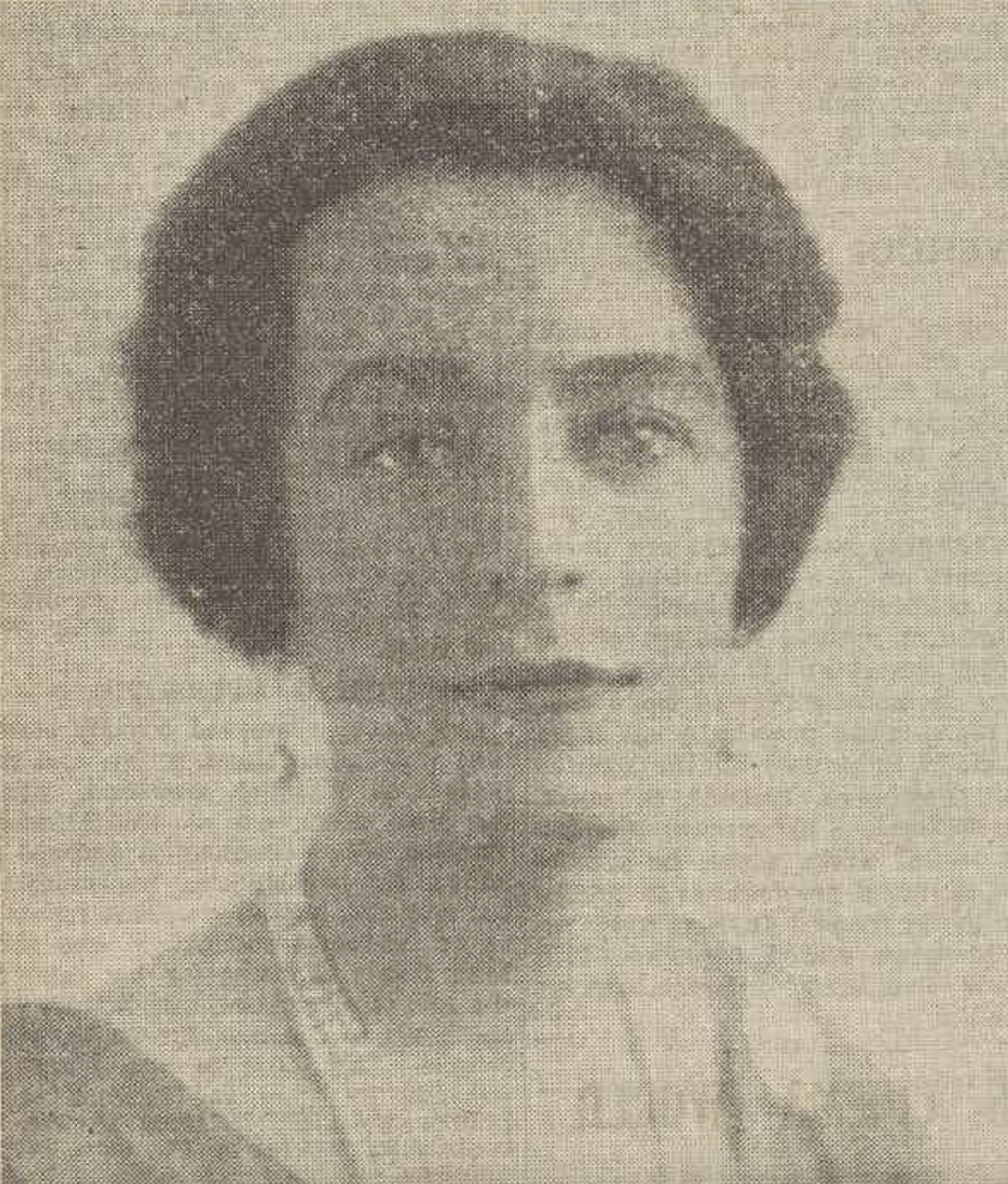
Gertrude Johnson in 1935

Gertrude Emily Johnson OBE (13 September 1894 – 28 March 1973) was an Australian coloratura soprano and founder of the National Theatre Movement in Melbourne.

== Early life ==
Johnson was born in 1894 at Prahran, Melbourne. She was the second child of George and Emily Johnson. George was a professor of music and both parents had been born in Victoria. Gertrude was educated at Presentation College Windsor. On the advice of Nellie Melba, Johnson enrolled at the age of 17 in the University of Melbourne Conservatorium of Music as a student of Anne Williams. In 1915, she followed Williams to Melba's new women's singing school at the Albert Street Conservatorium, East Melbourne (later the Melba Memorial Conservatorium). Johnson was accepted into Melba's classes, and the relationship developed to the point where Melba gave Johnson her own personal cadenzas, a valuable professional asset. The director of Albert Street, Fritz Hart, had a particular interest in Mozartian opera and was responsible for introducing Johnson to what was to be the core of her repertoire.

== Singing career ==
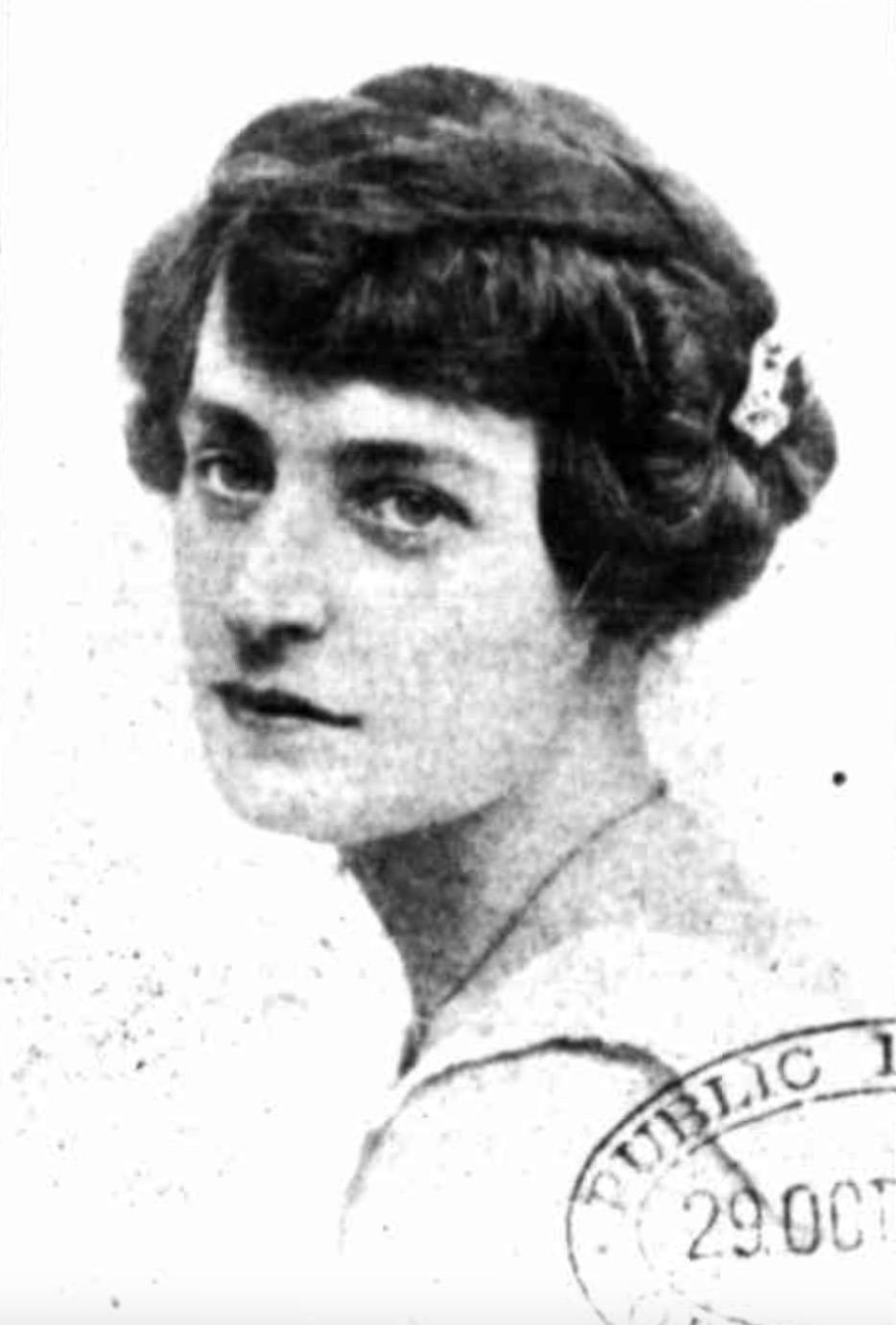
Gertrude Johnson in 1920

Through introductions from Melba, Johnson begun touring outback Queensland and New South Wales in 1917 with Count Ercole Filippini's troupe, and in 1919 to Melbourne, Sydney, Adelaide and New Zealand with the Rigo Grand Opera Company. By 1921 she had sailed to London and started singing with the British National Opera Company. Soon she was singing roles such as Micaela in Carmen, Marguerite in Faust and the Princess in Holst's The Perfect Fool at Convent Garden. She also had an extensive recording career with Columbia Records. Miss Johnson sang on the initial BBC radio broadcast of live opera performances.

== National Theatre Movement ==
Johnson returned to Melbourne in 1935, a woman of independent means, and retired from singing. Distressed at the lack of training opportunities in Australia for upcoming artists, she founded the National Theatre Movement (NTM). Included was an opera, drama and ballet school in the 1930s. The composer Edith Mary Harrhy was involved from the start and in the 1940s she became the musical director. The company grew rapidly, and protected from international competition during World War II, managed to produce 15 operas through this period. After the war the company continued to tour nationally, and in 1954 gave a Royal Command Performance at Melbourne's Princess Theatre in front of Queen Elizabeth II. The success of the performance and subsequent season led to the founding of the Australian Elizabethan Theatre Trust, which in turn ironically led to the decline of the NTM as a performing company. In an effort to stem the decline, a building fund for the National Theatre was established. Two fires in premises occupied by the NTM sapped morale, until finally a permanent home was found in the former Victory Cinema in St Kilda. The new premises finally opened in 1974.

== Honours ==
In 1951 Gertrude Johnson was appointed an Officer of the Order of the British Empire for her work as Director of the National Theatre. In 2005 she was inducted into the Victorian Honour Roll of Women posthumously.

== Death ==
Gertrude Johnson died on 28 March 1973 at Malvern. Her estate, valued at $117,000, was put towards scholarships for students at the National Theatre schools and continues today. From 2008 a new opera school opened in Melbourne (The Opera Studio/Gertrude Opera) now Australian Contemporary Opera Company (ACOCo) under Linda Thompson with the aims of continuing Miss Johnson's work. (Her own National Opera School merged with the Victorian College of the Arts in 1980). From 2009 a Scholarship called "The Gertrude Johnson Fellowship" has been awarded to a student at Gertrude Opera Studio continuing her legacy.

She was such a charismatic and inspirational character that she has become the central character in a novel. Vissi d’arte was written by Joanna Stephen-Ward and the character Harriet Shaw is based on Gertrude Johnson, although Gertrude was a far kinder person than Harriet Shaw. The rest of the characters are fictional. Vissi d'arte is set in Melbourne and many of the scenes take place in The National Theatre in St Kilda.

== Sources ==
- National Treasure (1994) Frank van Straten
- Opera and Ballet in Australia (1977) by John Cargher ISBN 072691360X
- Two Hundred Years of Opera in Australia by John Cargher
