= Arve =

River in France

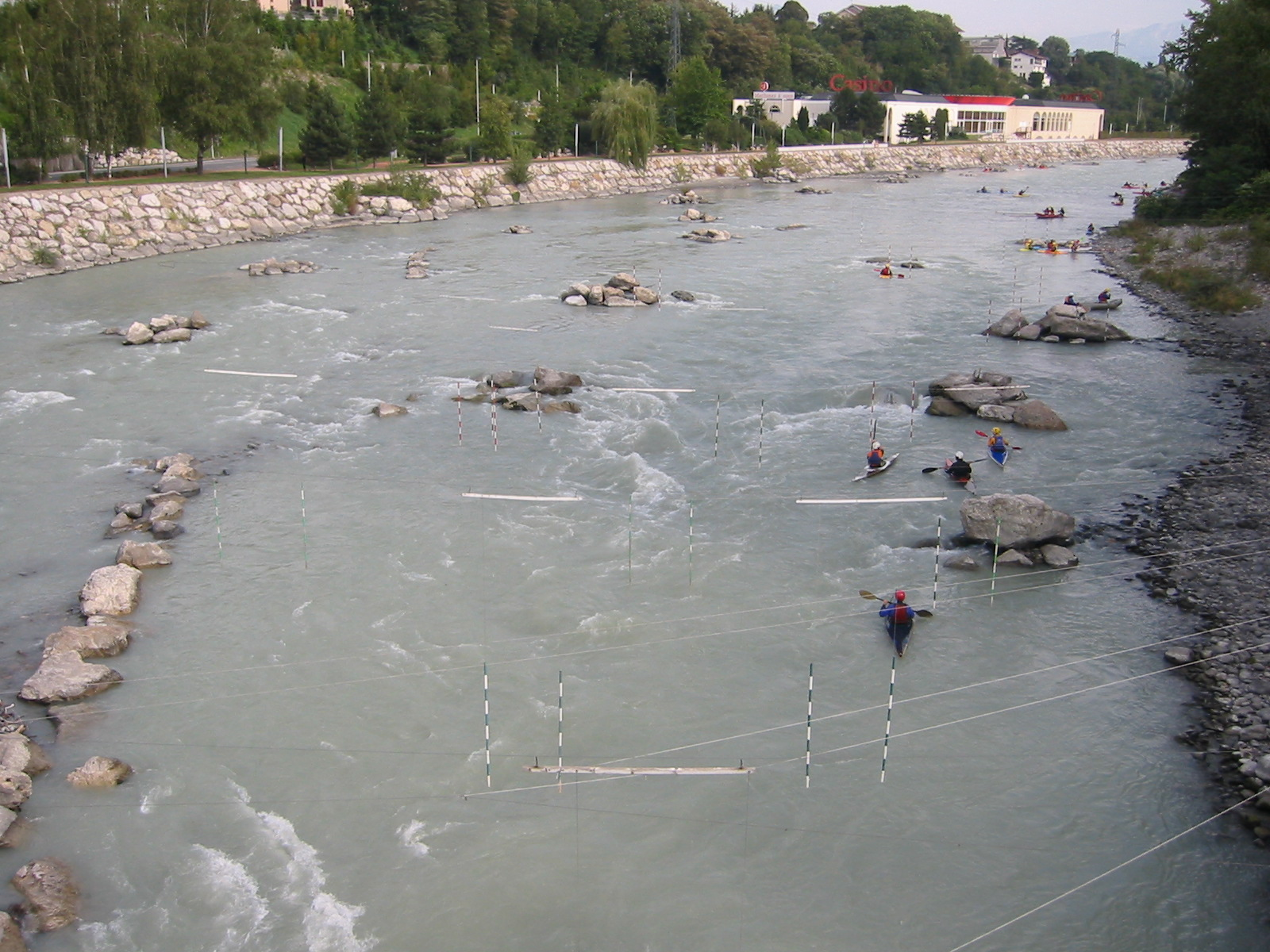
- The Arve near Annemasse, Haute-Savoie

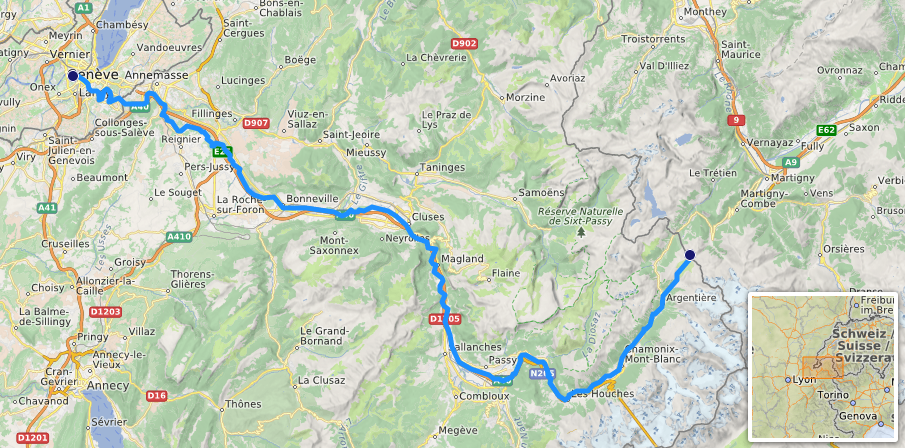
- Native name: L'Arve (French)

Location
- Country: France
- Department: Haute-Savoie
- Country: Switzerland
- Canton: Geneva

Physical characteristics
- Source
  - location: Col des Montets near Chamonix
  - coordinates: 46.00341°N 6.92029°E
  - elevation: 1,516 m (4,974 ft)
- Mouth
  - location: Rhône in Geneva
  - coordinates: 46.20129°N 6.12197°E
  - elevation: 370 m (1,210 ft)
- Length: 108 km (67 mi)
- Basin size: 1,976 km^{2} (763 sq mi)
- Discharge
  - average: 79 m^{3}/s (2,800 cu ft/s)

Basin features
- Progression: Rhône→ Mediterranean Sea

The Arve (French pronunciation: [aʁv]) is a river in France (département of Haute-Savoie), and Switzerland (canton of Geneva). A left tributary of the Rhône, it is 108 km (67 mi) long, of which 9 km in Switzerland. Its catchment area is 1,976 km^{2} (763 sq mi), of which 80 km^{2} in Switzerland. Its average discharge in Geneva is 79 m^{3}/s (2,800 cu ft/s).

Rising in the northern side of the Mont Blanc massif in the Alps, close to the Swiss border, it receives water from the many glaciers of the Chamonix valley (mainly the Mer de Glace) before flowing north-west into the Rhône on the west side of Geneva, where its much higher level of silt brings forth a striking contrast between the two rivers.

The Arve flows through Chamonix, Sallanches, Oëx, Cluses, Bonneville, Annemasse and Geneva. Tributaries include, from source to mouth: Arveyron, Diosaz, Bon-Nant, Sallanche, Giffre, Borne, Menoge, Foron, Seymaz and Aire.

== Gallery ==
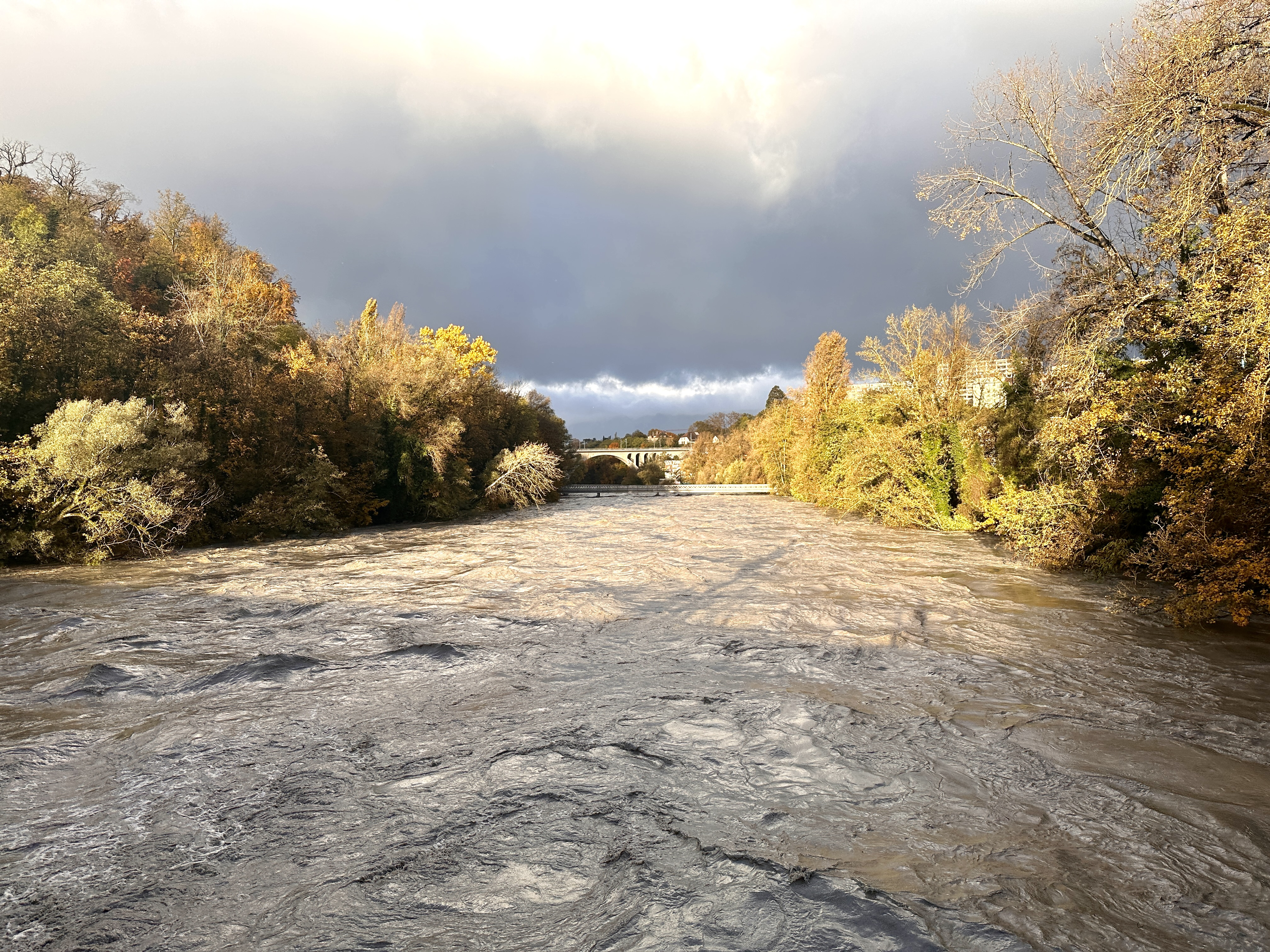
The river Arve in a period of flood as it joins the Rhone river in Jonction (Geneva)

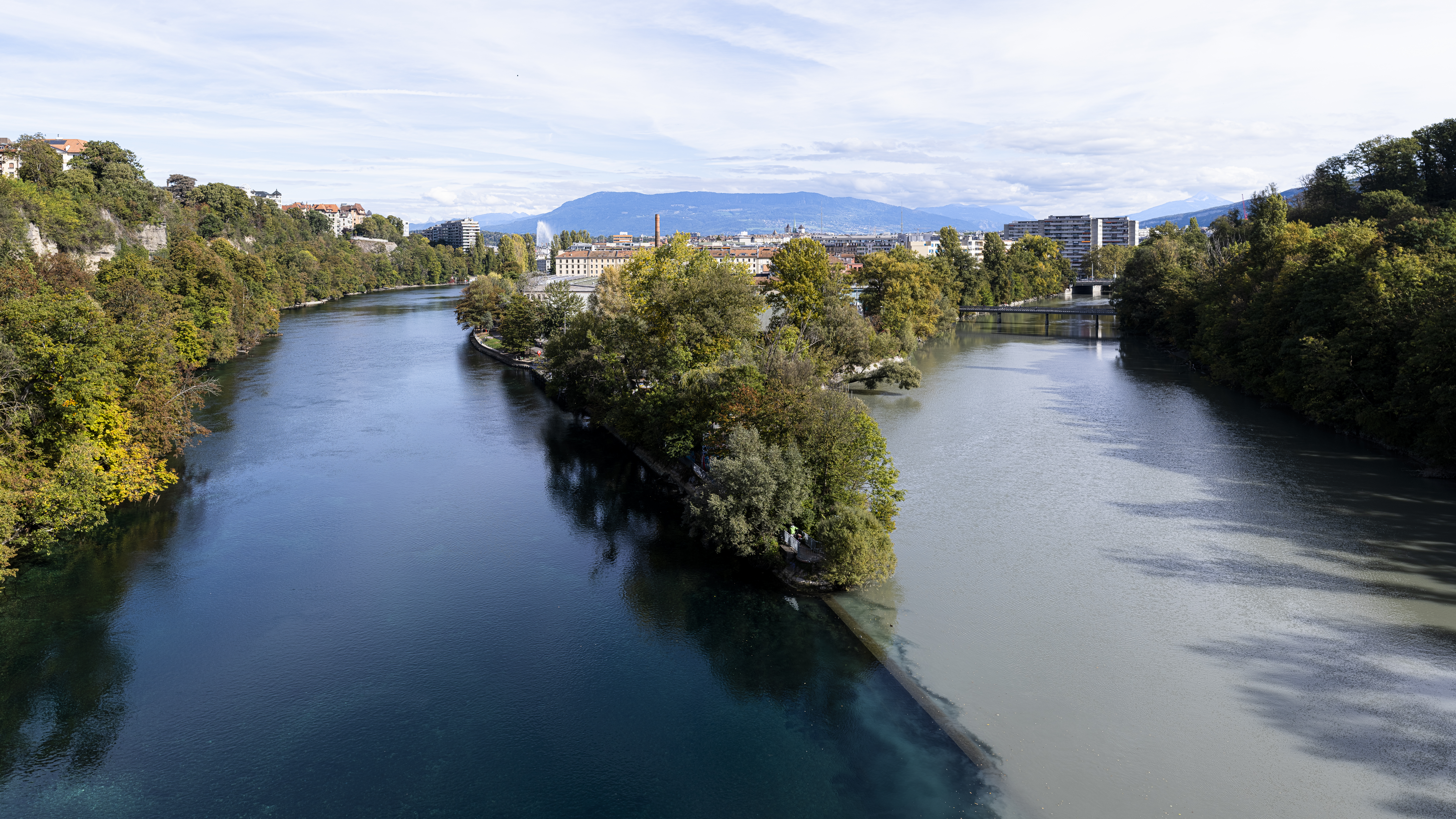
The Arve (right) meets the Rhône in Geneva

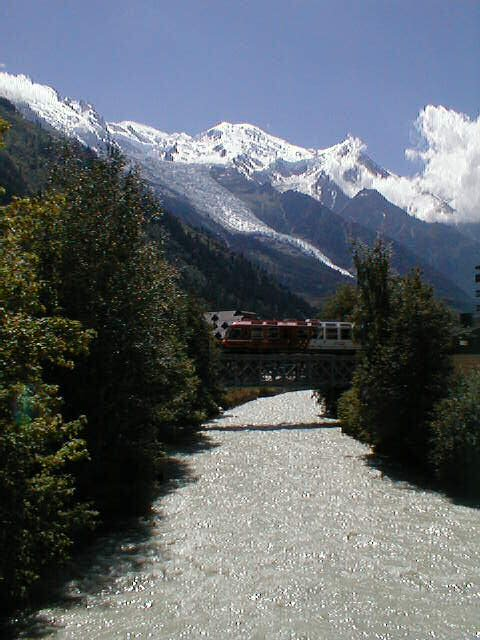
The Arve in Chamonix

== See also ==
- List of rivers in France
- List of rivers in Switzerland
