= Greenville Light Opera Works =

Professional non-profit performing arts organization

The Greenville Light Opera Works (GLOW) is a non-profit professional opera, operetta and musical theatre company in Greenville, South Carolina. In 2013, the company began operating under the name Glow Lyric Theatre.

== Description ==
Glow Lyric Theatre is a professional non-profit (501C3) performing arts organization. In 2013, Glow moved permanently to a Summer Festival season, producing shows in repertory during the month of July and August. They then added a Winter/Spring "Raising Voices" series to be performed at various venues in Greenville, SC. All productions are fully staged with orchestra or band (for musical theatre). Glow is a member of the Southeastern Theatre Conference (SETC) and is an associate member of Opera America.

== History ==
Glow Lyric Theatre was founded in 2009 by opera singer, conductor, and music professor at Presbyterian College, Dr. Christian Elser, and musical theatre actress and stage director Ms. Jenna Tamisiea. Glow’s inaugural production of Mozart's The Impresario in April 2010 took place at the Warehouse Theatre in Greenville, South Carolina before the residency at Centre Stage Theatre was announced in the fall of 2010. Glow was in residence at Centre Stage until fall 2013. In the summer of 2013 Glow announced their formal move to the Peace Center's Gunter Theatre for the 2014 Summer Festival, and the Younts Center for Performing Arts for their new Chamber Opera Series. Glow has since flourished, producing a Raising Voices Series every spring of two to three concert performances, and as fully produced three show Summer Festival Season, at the Kroc Center Fred Collins Performing Arts Stage.

In the spring of 2012, Greenville Light Opera Works opened the Glow School of Music & Drama, a community music school dedicated to musical theatre education for children. The Ryan Allen Apprentice Artist Program was initiated in 2013 (GAAP). This young artist program gives four young pre-professional singers the chance to perform and cover roles in the Glow Festival Season, as well as receive stage training and master classes in opera and musical theatre.

In February 2024, the company cancelled its 2024 summer season, citing financial difficulties.

=== Productions ===
- 2010 (half season): The Impresario (Mozart), GLOW Goes to the Opry!
- 2010-2011 season: Trial by Jury (Gilbert and Sullivan), Rodgers & Hart: Songs in the Key of Love, Die Fledermaus (Johann Strauss, II)
- 2011-2012 season: The Mikado (Gilbert and Sullivan), Rock Opera!, Don Pasquale (Donizetti)
- 2013 (festival season): Jesus Christ Superstar (Lloyd-Webber & Rice), The Pirates of Penzance (Gilbert and Sullivan).
- 2013-14 Chamber Opera Series: Amahl and the Night Visitors (Menotti), La Tragédie de Carmen (Bizet/Brook)
- 2014 Festival Season: La Bohème (Puccini) and "Rent" (Larson)
- 2015 Festival Season: The Wiz (Smalls) and Hot Mikado (Bell/Bowman)
- 2016 Festival Season: Roméo et Juliette (Gounod) and West Side Story (Bernstein)
- 2017 Festival Season: Hair (Ragni, Rado & McDermott), Crucible (Ward), The Gondoliers (Gilbert and Sullivan)
- 2018 Festival Season: In the Heights (Maranda), H.M.S. Pinafore (Gilbert and Sullivan), Fidelio (Beethoven)
- 2019 Festival Season: The Best Little Whorehouse in Texas (Carol Hall), My Fair Lady (Lerner & Loewe), Carmen (Bizet)
- 2020 Festival Season: This season was cancelled due to the COVID-19 pandemic
- 2021 Festival Season: Rock Opera, Passione, The Jenna & Christian Show
- 2022 Festival Season: Aida, Stinney: An American Execution, Classic Broadway
- 2023 Festival Season: The Handmaid's Tale (Ruders), Cabaret (Kander & Ebb), Black Broadway

== See also ==
- Greenville Symphony Orchestra
- Peace Center
