= Marilyn Richardson =

Australian soprano (born 1936)

- Born: 10 June 1936 (age 90); Sydney, New South Wales, Australia
- Education: New South Wales Conservatorium of Music

Marilyn Richardson (born 10 June 1936) is an Australian operatic soprano. She sang Laura in the first performances of Richard Meale's opera, Voss.

== Career ==
Born in Sydney on 10 June 1936, Richardson studied singing and piano at the New South Wales Conservatorium of Music.

Richardson won a Churchill Fellowship and went to Europe to continue her studies with Pierre Bernac in Paris and Conchita Badía in Barcelona. She made her European debut in 1972 in Basel singing the leading role in Alban Berg's opera, Lulu.

Back in Australia she sang Aida with the Opera Australia and many other roles followed, with her repertoire covering medieval to late twentieth-century works. Sydney music critic Roger Covell described her performance as Laura in the world premiere of Richard Meale's Voss as a "striking portrayal".

She has had songs composed for her by Ann Carr-Boyd, Richard Mills, Larry Sitsky, Nigel Butterley, Richard Meale and Philip Bračanin.

In 1993 Richardson was awarded a Doctor of Music (honoris causa) by the University of Queensland in recognition of her career both as singer and teacher in Australia and worldwide.
