= Mer de glace (opera) =

1991 Australian opera

Mer de glace is an opera in two acts with a prologue composed by Australian composer Richard Meale from 1986 to 1991 to a libretto by David Malouf. It is an adaptation of, and commentary on, Mary Shelley's 1818 novel Frankenstein. It presents a tableaux-like juxtaposition of some ideas of the novel alongside the real dealings of Mary Shelley with Percy Bysshe Shelley and Lord Byron.

While Voss, another collaboration between Malouf and Meale, is often considered the best Australian opera, some critics, including Andrew Ford, believe Mer de Glace may be superior. The opera was well-received at its initial performance.

Mer de Glace is a postmodernist opera of the order of John Adams's Nixon in China. The original Frankenstein is a novel about the creation of a human monster. Malouf enriches this by taking Mary Shelley, the novelist, her lover and friends into the narrative of the opera. She has a nightmare in which they assume the character of protagonists: scientist, monster, abandoned child, exploited lover, friendly observer. Meale's music refers to operas of Wagner (Tristan und Isolde) and Debussy (Pelléas et Mélisande) as commentary on the action; the conventional moral views of the 19th century public are shown in musical parodies of the era's choral writing.

== Structure and plot ==
The headings shown here come from Michael Hannan's The Music of Richard Meale. The synopses however derive from the full score at the Australian Music Centre.

=== Prologue ===
Claire Clairmont, now an old woman living in Florence, reflects on her youth and her rivalry with Mary Shelley, the wife of poet Percy Bysshe Shelley. Claire loved Percy and bore his child, but Mary was the guardian of his legacy.

Then Claire finds herself on the slowly moving glacier on Mont Blanc, the Mer de Glace. The ghost of Shelley appears and sings a paean to the grandeur of the mountains. Claire herself feels she is sleepwalking in wonderment at the glacier, close to madness. Shelley calls to her, then to Mary. Claire feels the glacier is "some sleek animal" with frozen blood in its veins. "If only I should wake it!" The women call to Shelley, but he is preoccupied with his own supremacy to the ice, "I never dreamed ... far above, snowy and serene". A guide appears, reducing the mountain first to a mere tourist object; then to a figure of the benign God. Shelley demurs: liberty is to be found in our aspiration ourselves to be God-like.

=== Act 1 ===
==== Scene 1 ====
Claire and Percy Shelley on the shore of Lake Geneva. Claire, guitar on her lap, sings a song Byron wrote for her. The song describes her as "one of Beauty's daughters". Shelley predicts the "little drama" of Claire being re-united with Byron, great poet and outcast among men. Claire begs him to stay: "Nothing must change among you, me and Mary."

Byron and his friend Polidori arrive in a small boat. Byron wades ashore, barefoot and limping. Shelley is glad to meet "Childe Harold", but Byron points to his damaged and down-at-heel appearance. Claire says Byron's indifference makes her weary.

Byron claims he is the weary one, a monster outcast from England who has dared fly in the face of nature's laws. (His sister has raised his child with Claire). Claire rejects his self-pity in anger, the supposed laws with contempt. Is he a lover, friend or brother? She is 18. He loved her once. He is indifferent to her.

==== Scene 2 ====
Claire, Shelley, Mary Shelley, Byron and Dr Polidori are marooned by bad weather at the Villa Diodati. Claire is bored and agitated: "Rain, rain, rain ..." She resists attempts at distracting her. Polidori suggests they tell one another stories. Mary declines, but Byron gets Polidori to tell the story of "Lenore and William", Claire to play Lenore and Shelley William. William (Shelley) returns to their marriage feast from the dead — to marry Lenore. "Aren't you afraid?" Shelley asks Claire. "Not of death. Only of being betrayed." Shelley, in and out of character, invites the company to "come dance at our wedding." His question torments Claire, who protests helplessly that Shelley and Mary are "changing the words". "They are all mad", says Byron.

==== Scene 3 ====
Mary Shelley's nightmare. She lies in bed with Shelley beside her. They are in her bedroom with a view of white in the windows. Shelley urges her not to be afraid. "It's the light off the icy peaks." Her nightmare is that the glacier is alive, though with ice in its veins.

Shelley tries to send her to sleep with a bland poem, but she notices a quiver in the limbs of the glacier. Its great bulk stirs, shocked into life by a vital spark. Its cheeks become flushed with life. The entire glacier begins to shift. Spring has come to a cold star. (Like a newborn baby) its heart feels the first beat of life. "To give birth to yourself gives so much pain."

Shelley declares that Mary in her delirium has called him Frankenstein. The monster itself has no name because Shelley has called it up out of himself. Shelley's name for himself is Prometheus.

==== Scene 4 ====
A field near the Lake of Geneva. Children are playing flower games: "Daisies are the eyes of the day, violets the eyes of the night."

As the atmosphere darkens Mary's child William, blindfolded, sings "Love in a mist". When he sings the world "love" he removes his blindfold only to see the Monster, who kills him. The children flee. The monster hides William's body, but is distracted by the sound of a festive violin.

==== Scene 5 ====
A scene of village courting. "Blue eyes, red lips, black boots. ... Close the window, lower the blind, dance me over the floor."

The Monster appears and tries violently to appropriate one of the girls. A fight ensues. The couples take flight. "We saw him, hideous."

==== Scene 6 ====
The dead William is carried away to be buried. The Monster asks what he had done to deserve being created. He hears Mary's lament for her dead son and realizes that in a sense he, the Monster, has killed his own brother. He asks Mary to forgive him. He asks his father also to forgive him. But Shelley vows instead to destroy him.

=== Act 2 ===
==== Prelude ====
Mary expects Shelley as Frankenstein, the "new Prometheus", to meet his creation, the Monster, on the Mer de Glace. Shelley is deeply ashamed of what he has wrought: "Hide me for a thousand centuries from the eyes of men."

==== Scene 1 ====
Confrontation on the Mer de Glace.

Shelley has been the "new Prometheus" defying God, his Creator. Now Shelley finds himself confronted by the creature he himself has created. The Monster pleads for loving acceptance from his creator, release from wretchedness and misery. Instead Shelley screams at him that he, the Monster, is a murderer who deserves to be condemned forever to an icy death. Shelley curses himself for having created such a being.

The Monster is in tears for being excluded from the human happiness of "couples dancing two by two on the grass". Why can't Shelley make him a mate to share his life? He imagines their life together. Then he turns Shelley's curse against him: Deny me this and I will haunt you down the ages to your last icy breath.

Shelley longs for escape from the nightmare. "Mary, where am I?"

==== Scene 2 ====
The wedding.

A chorus sings of the harvest (and traditional courting) coming to fruition. "Deck her hair with daisies ... bluebells in her hair, bride of the earth. And all the sons of the house shall come to the wedding. ... The bridegroom comes."

But the Monster appears: "I come to your wedding as promised. Where is my bride?"

Shelley: How dare you pollute the air at my wedding feast? Cursed be the day."

Claire: Who calls for the sleepwalker [in me]? Is the Monster my secret lover? No, I will never be a bride. I will be alone for all eternity." She faints.

A return to "reality". Shelley: Claire, I'm here, you're safe now. Nothing has happened. Polidori to Byron: This girl is carrying your child, Sir. Byron: Indeed Sir. And am I the father? What tells you that? Your diary!

==== Scene 3 ====
Claire tries to discuss her future with Shelley. He is evasive. Will he take her into his household? Shelley surrenders her and her child to the "generous" care of Byron. She has no choice. Has Shelley agreed to this? She must go back to England and have the child, unsupported but reassured by Shelley.

She asks Shelley to hold her and her the "under her heart". He declines. He lives not by the laws of nature, but the laws of men. She can only "love and be silent". Will her life "always be someone else's story? I thought I was one of 'Beauty's daughters', but I am just a woman."

In Florence Polidori and Byron dispute the violent events that have occurred. Byron argues that the stories of the monster will survive them. "It is the story over and over again."

The story Byron proposes erases his own monstrous part in events. The chorus takes up the story and endlessly repeats it.

Claire: "Byron, where is my child? Shelley, where is she?"

== Performances ==
The first performance was given under Dobbs Franks at the Sydney Opera House on 3 October 1991. The cast was: David Collins-White in the dual part of Shelley/Frankenstein; Kerry Elizabeth Brown as Mary Shelley; Linda Thompson as Claire Clairemont; Lyndon Terracini as Lord Byron/The Monster; and Dominic Natoli as Polidori/the Tourist Guide. They were accompanied by the chorus of the Australian Opera and the orchestra of the Australian Opera and Ballet.

== Recordings ==
A complete recording of the 1991 performance broadcast live on ABC Classic is available on YouTube at 480p quality and lacks video, subtitles or libretto.

On the ABC 1995 recording Richard Meale: Viridian/Symphony No. 1/Scenes from Mer de Glace, played by the Adelaide Symphony Orchestra conducted by David Porcelijn are four scenes from Mer de Glace: 1. On the Mer de Glace (the second part of the prologue); 2. Prelude: Lake Geneva (act 1, scene 1); 3. Village Dance (act 1, scene 5); 4. Mary Shelley's Nightmare (act 1, scene 3). In transcription the voice parts are taken by an oboe, trumpet, cor anglais or saxophone.

On the 2009 ABC recording Richard Meale: Cantilena Pacifica is a performance of "Concert monologue from Mer de glace" by soprano Merlyn Quaife and the Tasmanian Symphony Orchestra conducted by Richard Mills. The monologue is a concert aria formed from five scenes in the opera: Claire Clairemont's part of the prologue; her scene on the Mer de Glace; Shelley's meditation on the meaning of Mont Blanc; Claire's frustration at being cooped up by the rain; her rejection of the "law of men" from act 2, scene 3.
