= Stacey Alleaume =

Australian operatic soprano (born 1985 or 1986)

Stacey Alleaume (born 1985 or 1986 (age 40–41)) is an Australian-born soprano of Mauritian descent. She is a principal soprano for Opera Australia.

== Biography ==
Alleaume's family came from Port Louis in Mauritius where her grandfather had been mayor and her grand-uncle curator of the opera house. She then grew up in the Melbourne suburb of Narre Warren and studied voice at the University of Melbourne and the Music Academy of the West in Montecito, California.

In 2016 she became a member of the Opera Australia Moffatt Oxenbould Young Artist Program after winning the Dame Joan Sutherland Scholarship; in the same year she performed in a large scale "silent opera" (The Eighth Wonder in a headphones-only presentation) on the steps of the Sydney Opera House. Alleaume's voice was used in the 2021 feature film Falling for Figaro for the character Millie Cantwell.

In 2017, Alleaume made her debut as Violetta Valéry in La traviata with Opera Australia at four hours' notice. She notably reprised the role to critical acclaim for Opera Australia's Handa Opera on Sydney Harbour in 2021 and again for Welsh National Opera in 2023. In 2025, Alleaume again stepped in at a day's notice to sing Pamina, which she had sung before but never in German, for a production of The Magic Flute by the State Opera of South Australia.

She has sung for Opera Australia, Bregenzer Festspiele, Deutsche Oper am Rhein, Welsh National Opera, Theater an der Wien, Scottish Opera, Opera Hong Kong, Fondazione Petruzelli, Australian Contemporary Opera Company and Royal Opera House Muscat.

== Awards ==
- Sydney Eisteddfod Opera Scholarship (2012)
- Melbourne Sun Aria (2013)
- Dame Joan Sutherland Award (2016)

== Recordings ==
- Moonlight Reflections, Move Records, MCD 613, 2021.
