= Arveyron =

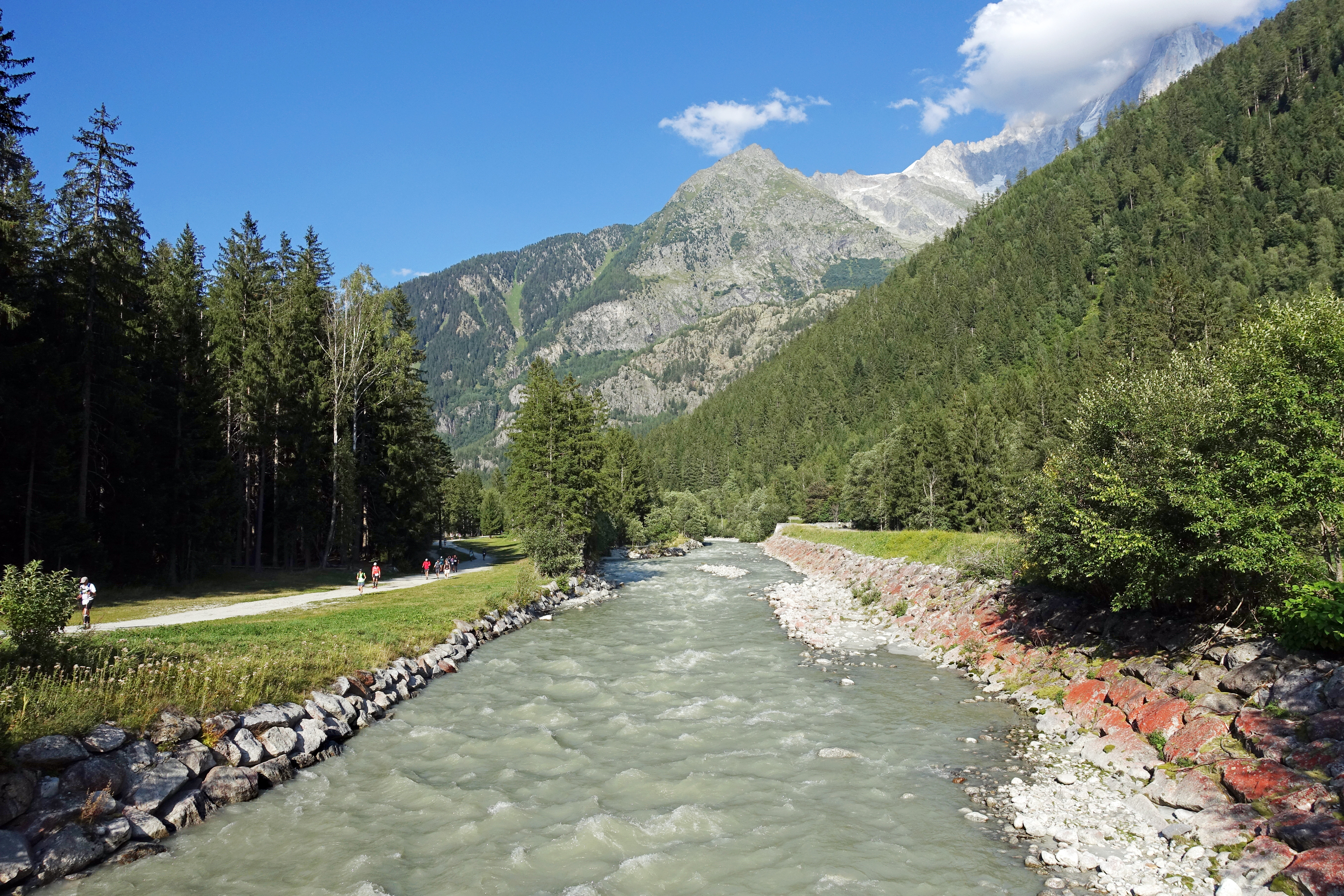

- Location within France Location within Auvergne-Rhône-Alpes

Location
- Country: France

Physical characteristics
- Source
  - location: Mont Blanc Massif
  - coordinates: 45°56′35″N 6°55′7″E
- Mouth
  - location: Arve
  - coordinates: 45°55′51″N 6°52′24″E
- Length: 4.9 km (3.0 mi)

Basin features
- Progression: Arve→ Rhône→ Mediterranean Sea

The Arveyron (French pronunciation: [aʁveʁɔ̃]) is a left tributary to the river Arve, rising in the famous Mer de Glace just above Chamonix in south-eastern France. It flows into the Arve in Chamonix. It is 4.9 km (3.0 mi) long.
