= Voss (opera) =

Opera by Richard Meale

Voss is an opera by Australian composer Richard Meale with libretto by David Malouf. It is an adaptation of Patrick White's novel of the same name. The opera was commissioned by The Australian Opera, and premiered at the Adelaide Festival in 1986. It was reprised in Adelaide in 2022, in a co-production by State Opera South Australia and Victorian Opera.

== Commission ==
In 1977, impresario and administrator Peter Hemmings, general manager of the Australian Opera (as Opera Australia was then known), commissioned Meale to write an opera based on Voss, Patrick White's 1957 novel.

== Work in progress ==
White's novel was predominantly set in Queensland, and appropriately, Meale's librettist for the opera was Queensland writer, poet and playwright David Malouf. Malouf completed the libretto in 1978, but Voss would not be performed until 1986.

== Performances ==
Twelve minutes of Voss – the "Garden Scene" – was a feature of the 1982 Adelaide Festival

The Australian Opera conducted by Stuart Challender premiered Voss, directed by Jim Sharman on 1 March 1986 at the Adelaide Festival Theatre.

The production was given a second run in 1990 with Geoffrey Chard, who reprised the titular role. It was conducted by Dobbs Franks.

Voss also enjoyed a successful run at the Sydney Opera House in 2008. The Australian Opera production was directed by Jim Sharman, with Stuart Challender conducting, and starring Marilyn Richardson and Geoffrey Chard.

The opera was revived in 2022 in a joint production by State Opera South Australia and Victorian Opera. Samuel Dundas played Voss, while Trevor Jamieson played Dugald. Originally scheduled to be performed in Melbourne in August 2021, owing to a fifth lockdown during the COVID-19 pandemic, the season was cancelled and rescheduled to a single performance in Adelaide. The option of viewing a performance livestreamed from the Adelaide Festival Theatre on 7 May 2022 and viewable for six months was made available. The production was well-reviewed, with two critics giving it four out of five stars.

== Recording ==
The Australian Opera's production was recorded by the ABC in 1986 and released internationally on the Philips label in 1987.

The recording received the ARIA Award for Best Classical Album in 1988.

In 2011, Voss was added to the National Film and Sound Archive (NFSA) of Australia's Sounds of Australia registry.

=== Roles ===
The roles on the recording were as follows:

Role	Voice type
Johann Ulrich Voss	baritone
Frank le Mesurier	tenor
Palfreyman	baritone
Harry Robarts	tenor
Judd	baritone
Mrs Judd	mezzo-soprano
Mr Bonner	bass
Mrs Bonner	mezzo-soprano
Belle Bonner	soprano
Laura Trevelyan	soprano
Rose Portion	mezzo-soprano
Lieutenant Tom Radclyffe	tenor
Mr Topp	tenor
Mercy	soprano
A reporter	tenor

== The Voss Journey (2009) ==
The Voss Journey was a four-day event which included seminars, concerts, films, and exhibitions inspired by the novel, hosted by the NFSA in collaboration with Canberra International Music Festival and many other institutions. It included presentations by many of the artists involved in the staging of the opera.
