= Mer de Glace =

Glacier located on the Mont Blanc massif, in the French Alps

- Sea of Ice
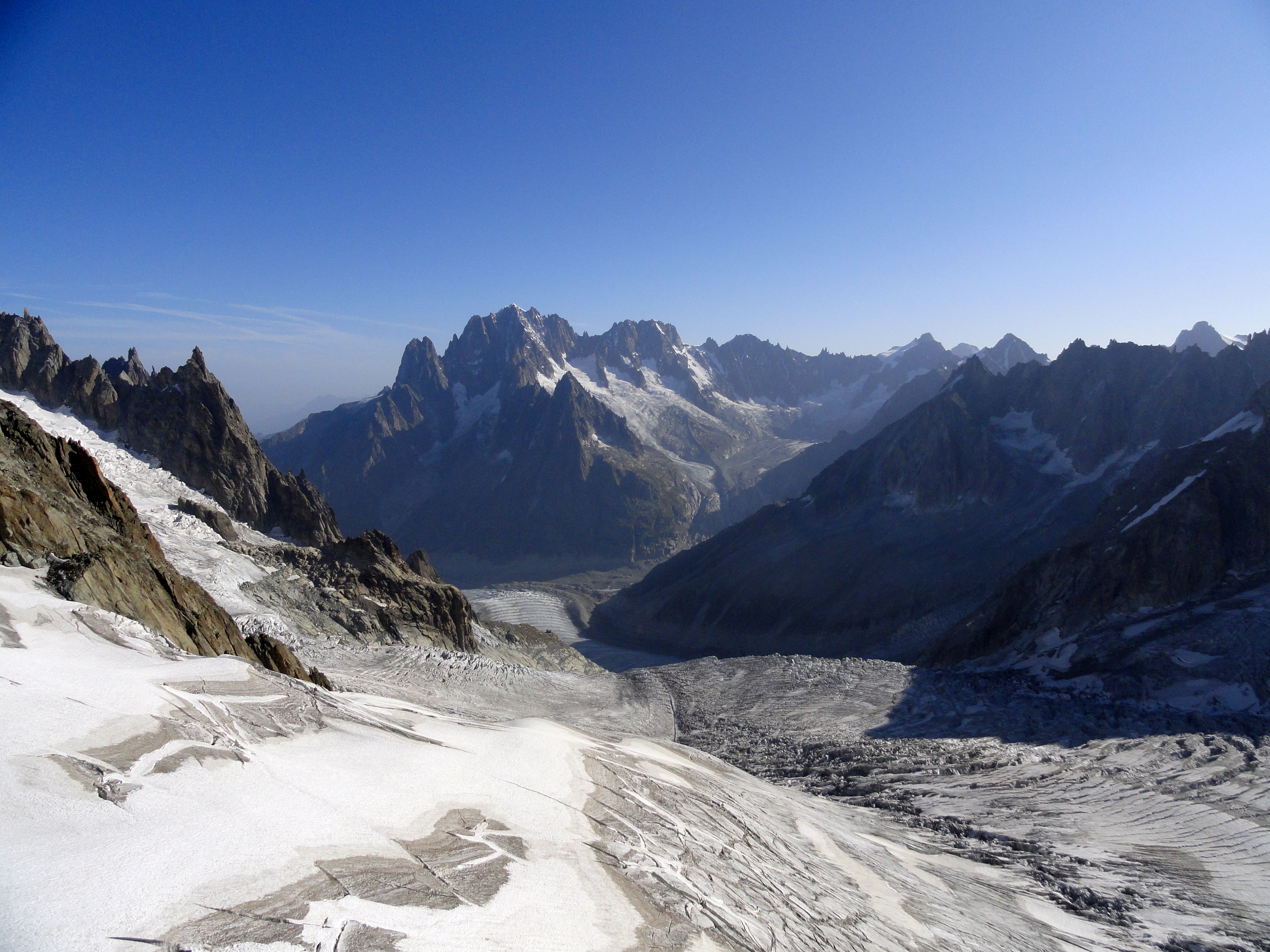

- Location within France
- Location: Northern slopes of the Mont Blanc massif
- Coordinates: 45°54′58″N 6°56′14″E
- Length: 7.5 km (4.7 mi); 12 km (7.5 mi) total length

The Mer de Glace (French pronunciation: [mɛʁ də ɡlas], lit. 'Sea of Ice') is a valley glacier located on the northern slopes of the Mont Blanc massif, in the French Alps. It is 7.5 km long and 200 metres (660 ft) deep, but when all its tributary glaciers are taken into account, it can be regarded as the longest and largest glacier in France, and the second longest in the Alps after the Aletsch Glacier.

I can no otherwise convey to you an image of this body of ice, broken into irregular ridges and deep chasms than by comparing it to waves instantaneously frozen in the midst of a violent storm.

— William Coxe 1777

== Geography ==
The glacier lies above the Chamonix valley. The pressure within the ice is known to reach at least 30 atmospheres. The Mer de Glace can be considered as originating at an elevation of 2,100 metres (6,900 ft), just north of the Aiguille du Tacul, where it is formed by the confluence of the Glacier de Leschaux and the Glacier du Tacul. The former is fed by the Glacier de Talèfre, whilst the latter is, in turn, fed by the Glacier des Périardes, the vast Glacier du Géant and the broad icefields of the Vallée Blanche. The Glacier du Tacul supplies much more ice than the Glacier de Leschaux.

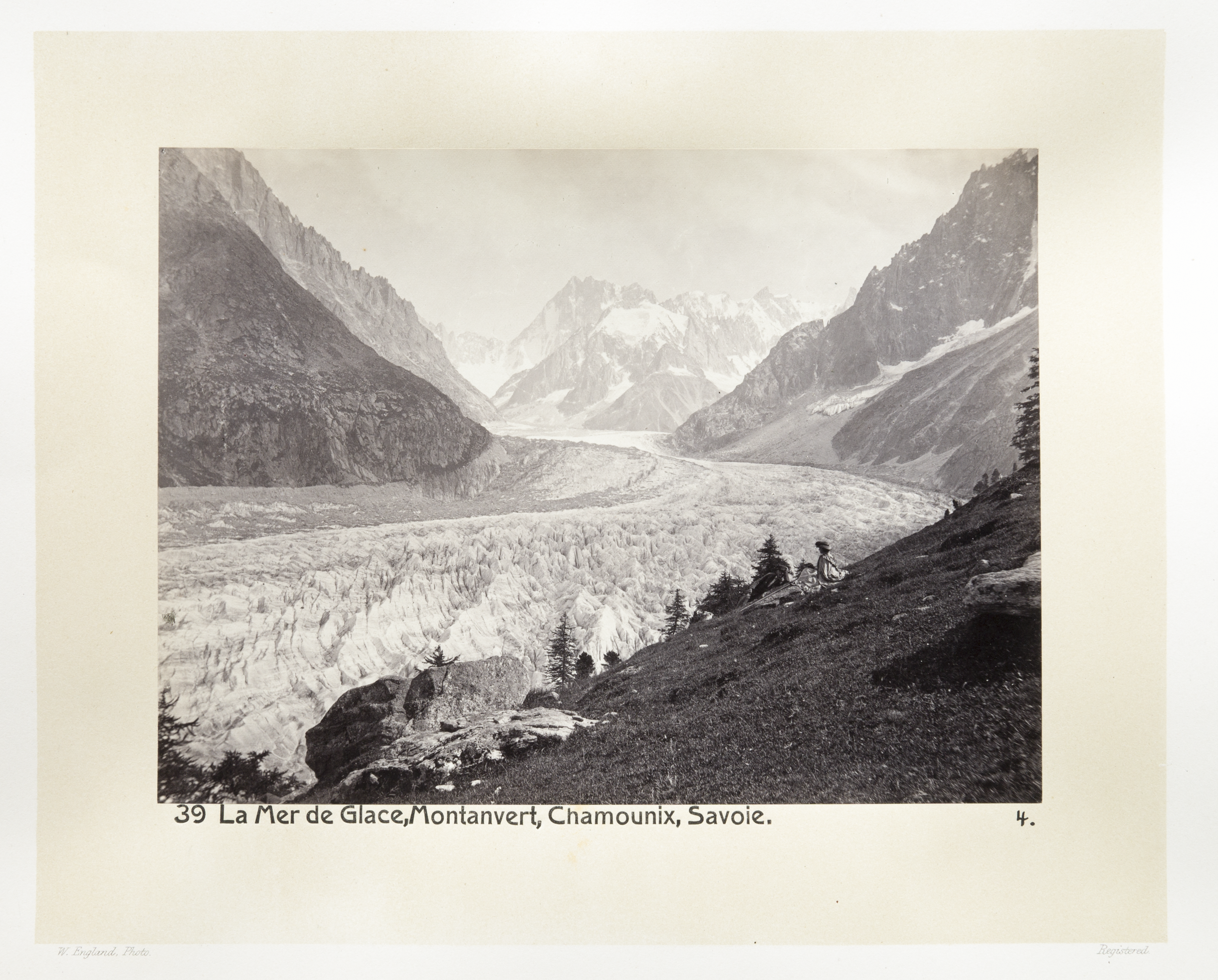
Mer de Glace, circa 1870

However, if the Mer de Glace is considered in its broadest sense (i.e. from source to tongue), it is a compound valley glacier, gaining ice from snowfields that cover the heights directly north of Mont Blanc at an altitude of around 4,000 metres. It flows for a total distance of 12 kilometres, covering an area of 32 square kilometres in the central third of the Mont Blanc massif.

From the Aiguille du Tacul, the Mer de Glace flows north-north-west between Aiguille du Moine on the east and Trélaporte on the west. It descends below Montenvers, at which point it is approximately 0.5 km wide, and descends to approximately 1,500 metres (4,900 ft). The glacier was once easily visible from Chamonix but has been shrinking backwards, and is now barely visible from below. The surface topography of the Mer de Glace changed very little during the first third of the 20th century, but from 1939 to 2001 the surface of the glacier has lowered an average of 30 cm each year, corresponding to an equivalent loss of 700 million cubic metres of water.

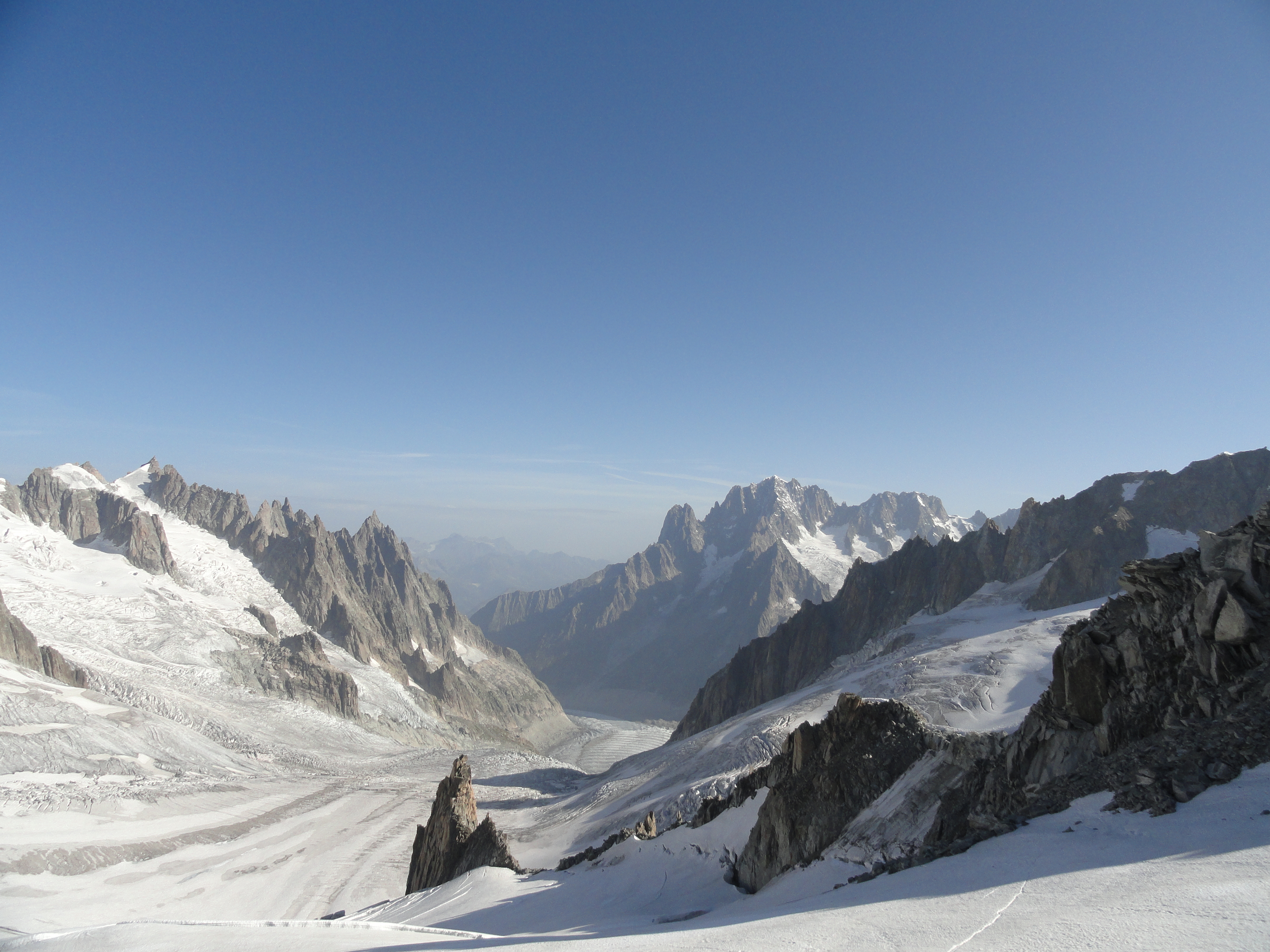
Mer de Glace, 2011

When the tension in the ice increases as the slope increases, the glacier is unable to deform and crevasses appear. These are notably transversal and, when there is intense crevasse activity on the steepest terrain, blocks of seracs appear as the glacier breaks up. Crevasses are of variable depth, depending on their position, and may be as deep as fifty metres. Seracs always form in the same places, namely the steepest sections over which the glacier flows. As crevasses open and seracs tumble downstream, the supply of ice is renewed by the constant flow from upstream. Broad banding patterns, visible on the surface of the Mer de Glace, are known as ogives, or Forbes bands, and result from differences in summer and winter collapse rates of the serac fields. On 24 July 1842, Scottish physicist James David Forbes observed the pattern of light and dark dirt bands on the Mer de Glace from the nearby Aiguille des Grands Charmoz and began to consider whether glaciers flowed in a similar fashion to a sluggish river and with a viscous or plastic manner.

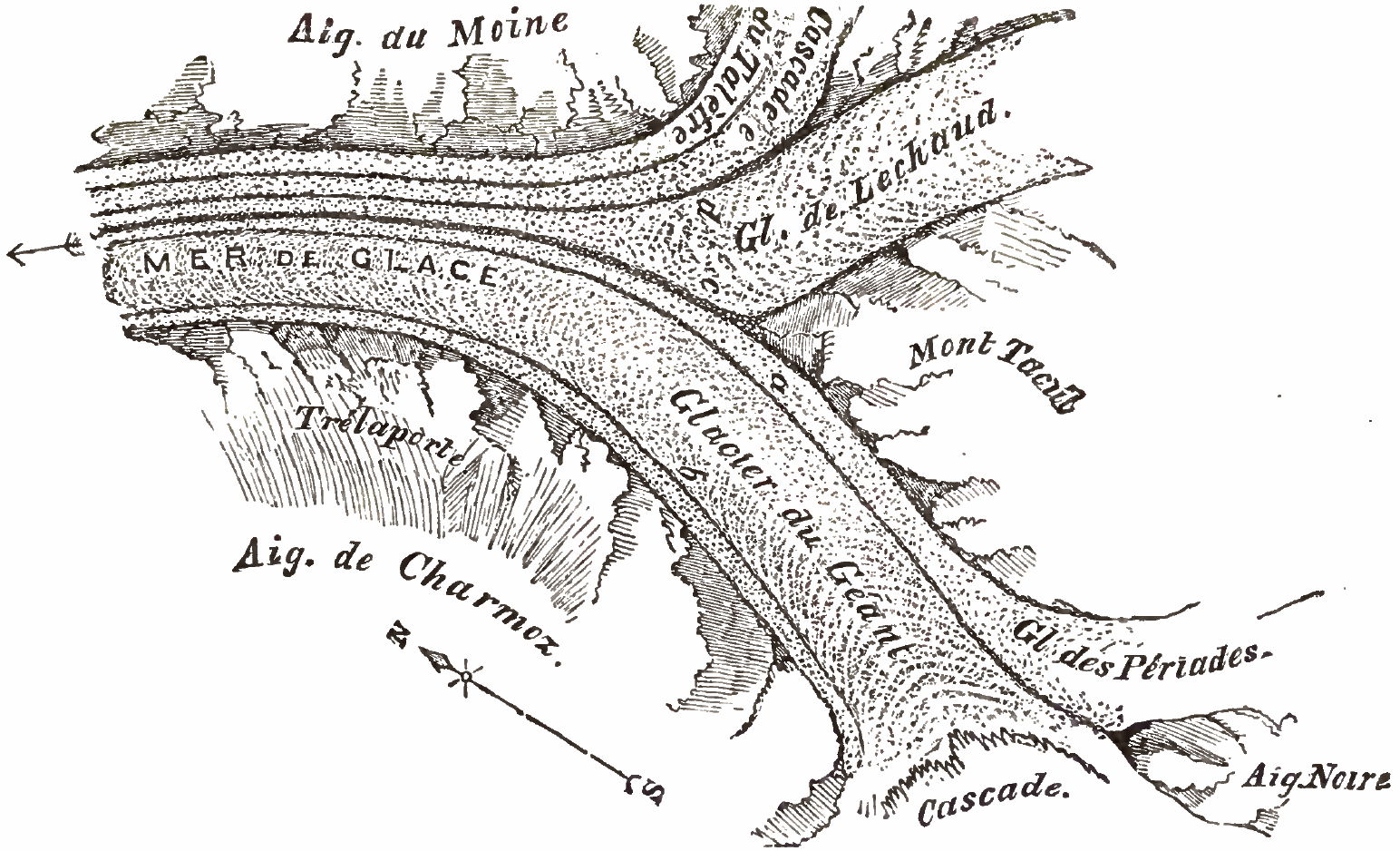
John Tyndall explored the glacial tributaries feeding Mer de Glace in 1857

In the 18th and 19th centuries, the glacier descended all the way down to the hamlet of Les Bois, where it was known as Glacier des Bois. At that time the river Arveyron emerged from the glacier under a grotto-like vault (grotte d'Arveyron) and, through the accounts of early writers and explorers, attracted many more visitors, painters and later photographers, for example J. M. W. Turner's Source of the Arveron in the Valley of Chamouni Savoy, 1816. The position of its front end fluctuated over the years but its maximum extent was in the mid-19th century.

== Literary and cultural references ==
Mary Shelley's 1818 novel Frankenstein references Mer de Glace during Victor Frankenstein's hikes into the Mont Blanc massif. Dr. Frankenstein meets his creation twice during mountaineering on the Mer de Glace. This episode inspired the 1991 opera Mer de glace by Australian composer Richard Meale to a libretto by his compatriot David Malouf.

== See also ==
- Mer de Glace ice cave
- Arveyron
- Chemin de fer du Montenvers
- Électricité de France
- List of glaciers
- Mont Blanc massif

== Notes ==
=== Sources ===
- Grove, Jean M. (1988). The Little Ice Age. ISBN 0-415-01449-2.
- Tyndall, John (1896). The Glaciers of the Alps. Longmans, Green and Co. New edition reprinted as ISBN 1-4212-0908-X.
