= National Theatre, Melbourne =

Theatre and theatrical arts school in Melbourne, Australia

National Theatre
- Victory Theatre
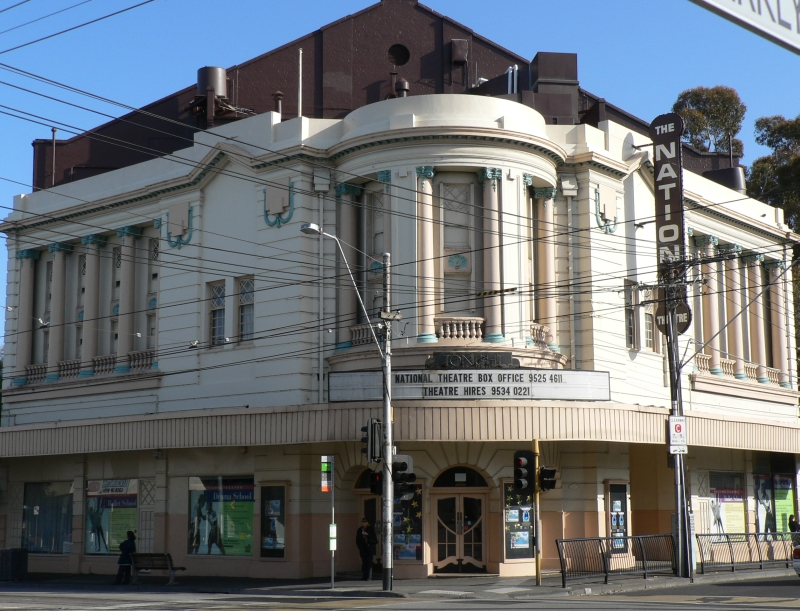
- Interactive map of National Theatre
- Address: Cnr Barkly and Carlisle Streets, St Kilda, Victoria; Melbourne; Australia
- Coordinates: 37.8668542°S 144.9809236°E
- Owner: Australian National Memorial Theatre Ltd
- Capacity: 783
- Current use: Community Arts Centre & Performing Arts Schools

Construction
- Opened: 1921
- Rebuilt: 1972/4

Website
- www.nationaltheatre.org.au

The National Theatre is a 783-seat Australian theatre and theatrical arts school located in the Melbourne bayside suburb of St Kilda, on the corner of Barkly and Carlisle Streets. The building was constructed in 1921 as The Victory Theatre (3000 seat cinema), rebuilt as 2550 seat cinema in 1928, finally converted to a live venue in 1972/4 with 783 seats. The stalls seating was converted to studios and rehearsal rooms for the schools.

== National Theatre Movement ==
The National Theatre Movement (NTM) was established in 1935 by soprano Gertrude Johnson. After returning from an overseas career that included performing at Covent Garden, Johnson was dismayed at the lack of training and performing opportunities for Australian artists in their own country.

To that end the National Theatre was founded along with a network of companies throughout Australia. The Ballarat National Theatre was founded in 1938 along with other branches in Heidelberg, Yallourn and Swan Hill. Included in the network were an opera school (1935), drama school (1936) and ballet school (1939). Production companies (three arts festivals) ran through the 1940s and 1950s.

The National Theatre Movement previously occupied the Village Theatre in Toorak (destroyed by fire in April 1962) and then purchased (but not occupied) the Empress Theatre in Prahran, which was destroyed by fire in June 1971.

== Theatre building ==
The building now occupied by the National Theatre was built in the Beaux Arts style as a 3000-seat cinema and opened in 1921 as the Victory Theatre. In 1928 it was rebuilt in a more luxurious manner, with fewer seats, a larger balcony, and a much grander foyer. In 1971 Hoyts (a company that operates movie theaters) offered the company the Victory Theatre for conversion to a live theatre and rehearsal spaces. The current theatre consists of the original Victory dress circle extended with the addition of a sizeable stage and a fly tower. The original stalls were converted into five studios for drama, opera and ballet. One of the studios is itself a theatrette. The theatre opened in its current guise in August 1974, while the schools and administration moved there in September 1972.

== Drama school ==
The National Drama School dates from 1936, when it was established by Gertrude Johnson as the National Theatre Drama School. As of September 2026 the director of the school is Jaime Dörner.

Drama school alumni include Bella Heathcote, Kat Stewart, Richard Cawthorne, Brett Tucker, Janet Andrewartha, Jackie Woodburne, Ngaire Dawn Fair, Lawrence Mooney, Geraldine Quinn, and Esther Hannaford.

== Ballet school ==
The National Ballet school dates from 1939 and is the oldest in Australia. Alumni include Amber Scott, Jarryd Madden.

The ballet school currently conducts Royal Academy of Dance examinations and has ballet performances in the middle of the year and in December. The current artistic director of The National Ballet School is Damian Smith. Past dance artistic directors have included Kathleen Gorham, Gailene Stock, Marilyn Jones and Beverly Jane Fry.

== Opera school ==
The opera school merged with the Victorian College of the Arts in 1980. It was closed by the VCA in 2006 but the National Theatre now supports the new Opera School (Melbourne) established independently in 2008.
