= Richard Meale =

Australian composer

Richard Meale AM MBE FAHA
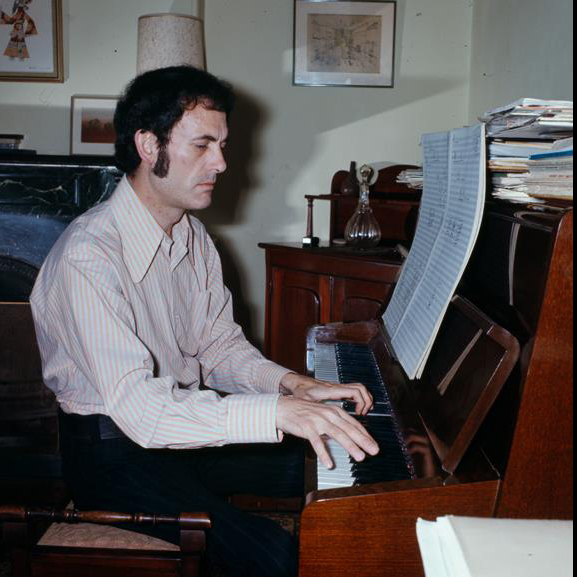
- Meale at home in Adelaide in 1972
- Born: 24 August 1932; Sydney, New South Wales, Australia
- Died: 23 November 2009 (aged 77)
- Education: NSW State Conservatorium of Music
- Occupations: Composer; Academic teacher
- Organizations: Australian Broadcasting Corporation; University of Adelaide

Richard Graham Meale (24 August 1932 – 23 November 2009) was a highly regarded Australian composer of instrumental works and operas, and an influential music educator.

== Life and works ==
=== Sydney 1932–1970 ===
Meale was born in Sydney in 1932. At the time the Meale family lived in Marrickville, an inner suburb of Sydney. Meale's father Oliver was an engineer, and his mother Lilla Adeline was the daughter of Benjamin Richards, a former mayor of Marrickville. His elder brother, Colin Meale, was a high school principal.

Meale was a prodigious teenager who left school because he hated exams. In the 1960s he studied piano with Winifred Burston at the NSW State Conservatorium of Music. Burston had him at 14 reading Gertrude Stein and the whole of Marcel Proust. He was also borrowing modern scores from the collection of the City of Sydney Library. He studied clarinet, harp, music history and theory, but as a composer he was self-taught.

From 1955 to 1960 he worked in record sales and as a buyer for a Sydney electrical appliance chain.

Meale's reputation as a pianist grew exponentially with each premiere of new works by Pierre Boulez, Karlheinz Stockhausen and other post-war European giants, especially the music of Olivier Messiaen. "To hear Meale play Messiaen is like hearing a sermon by John the Baptist," Melbourne critic Kenneth Hince wrote. Meale had been notating his own compositions since he was four; his powerful 1960 Sonata for flute and piano was the first work to survive his self-criticism. Technically the structure of his work was from early on atonal in the manner of the international avant-garde, though rarely fully serialist.

In 1964 he conducted the Australian premiere of Schoenberg's Pierrot lunaire (52 years after the Berlin one) with the soprano Marilyn Richardson. Meale left the Conservatorium without a diploma.

Meale worked 1963–1969 as an ABC concert and radio programmer. While working for the ABC, he continued his public career as a pianist and as a composer. Most of his work inspired by Javanese, Japanese and Spanish artforms (see below) was composed during his time at the ABC.

He was by the 1970s a member of a group of gay men – including composers John Bygate and Ian Farr – bent on exploring extremes of experience, inner and outer, through drink, drugs and sex – getting "smashed". He remained an active member of this group throughout his career until all except him had died, often of AIDS or overdoses. Aesthetically, their search for extreme experience showed eventually in his compositions inspired by Arthur Rimbaud (Incredible Floridas) and by Christopher Columbus (Very High Kings).

=== Los Angeles 1960–1961 ===
Meale side-stepped the well-worn path of Australian musicians to England. Instead he played in the ethnic musical ensembles of Bali, Java and Japan at the Institute of Ethnomusicology at the University of California, Los Angeles and at other American institutions on a Ford Foundation grant. The result was two works exploring the world of the poet Matsuo Bashō and the Edo period in Japan, Clouds now and then and Cicada. Nocturnes, symphonic in scope but not in form, had responded to the symbolism of the heavens. However esoteric-seeming, these works were intended, following McLuhan, to address the tribe of the emerging global village. John Carmody thought Nocturnes in particular a great and exciting score for a tribal world audience.

=== Spain ===
Classical Spain was another world that called. Very High Kings (Columbus's grateful salutation to Ferdinand and Isabella) is Meale's tribute to the mystical ambition of Christopher Columbus; Los Alboradas to the Spanish troubadours; Homage to García Lorca is what it says.

There is an agony in Lorca's poetry, there's a sound in his language which reflects this as well; there's an agony in the images, it's the agony of life and of coming to terms with dreadful circumstances, which is what he had to do and which has been the Spanish lot a lot of the time ... this had triggered a sort of response to this because I suppose of my own personal agonies.

Yet Meale's trip to Spain showed that his attachment was to works of art and imaginary worlds: the actual Spanish light reminded him painfully of Australia and he returned home.

I was not happy as a traveller, I did not feel really at home anywhere I went, even in Spain which was the most I felt at home, I still was a foreigner. I missed Australia, and I can't tell why. It's just this is what I grew up with and this is the thing I wanted to make meaning of in my life.

In other words, Meale's music and audience were international, not to say other-worldly; his nationalism was founded on a visceral attachment to home ground.

"But at home we should bypass a "stupid culture with its false ideas" in music as well as life. "[H]ow dare we inflict our concept of Australia which has been formed by a white English-based people?" "Attempting to get a nationalism into Australian music by deliberate ploys [is] jingoism".

So when Meale's break with modernism came in the late 1970s he could only present it as a personal and philosophical crisis, comparable to the change in Wittgenstein in World War II. In contrast, Meale's friend and rival Peter Sculthorpe (prompted initially by D. H. Lawrence's Kangaroo) made a smooth transition to a nationalism based on the Australian landscape.

=== Adelaide 1969–1988 ===
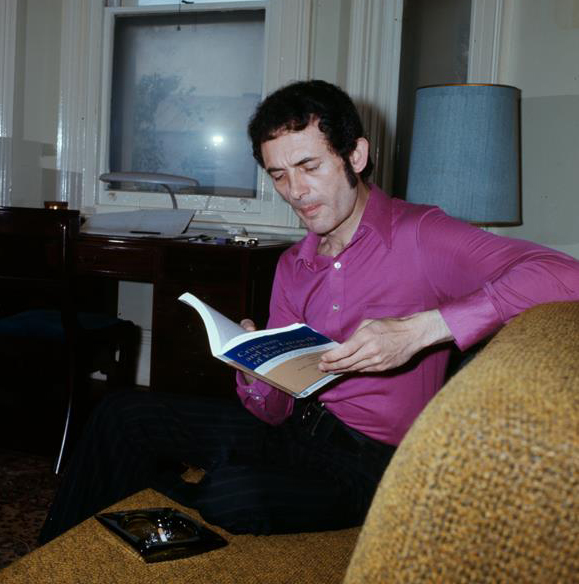
1972. The book is Lakatos & Musgrave's Criticism and the Growth of Knowledge published two years before.

From 1969 to 1988 Meale was a member of the music faculty of the University of Adelaide, South Australia, appointed partly on the personal fiat of Don Dunstan, the South Australian Premier, who became a friend and collaborator. Meale was an influential teacher of composers.

Ross Edwards: As a teacher ... he could encourage or pour scorn as he saw fit, but you always felt he cared at a deep level as you came away from lessons with your head buzzing, all fired up to read Lorca, McLuhan or Camus ("If you don't read this you're a fool", he would say).

David Worrall: [He] undertook his public roles – as an academic involved in curriculum reform, as a founding member of the Adelaide Festival Centre Trust and later as a long-term Board Director of the Australasian Performing Right Association – very seriously ... even at the expense of his own health.

Meale's found stamina and discipline required by university work, paradoxically freed him to compose as an amateur, "purely for pleasure". For the Australian pianist Roger Woodward Meale wrote Coruscations, a complex piano piece, widely admired internationally, adapting a serial technique of Boulez. In his 1972 book about Australia's contemporary composers, James Murdoch described Meale as "... the dominating figure in Australian composition".

But Coruscations was followed by a five-year silence. Though firmly part of the avant-garde among Australian composers, Meale experienced a stylistic rethink in the 1970s, abandoning an exclusively atonal approach in his orchestral work Viridian (1979) and his String Quartet No. 2 (1980) for a polytonal approach, and in later works embracing a frank tonality, with fin-de-siècle overtones, while retaining an individual voice.

The problem that I was encountering was brought to a head in 1979 when I began my Second String Quartet. Sadly, my best friend, Stephen Wilson, died after a sudden onset of cancer. It now became a matter of personal necessity to write a piece that would be a memorial to him. So it became clear that the work could not be based on any artifice; its existence had to lie in its emotional truth.

I found that I could not express certain things in the atonal idiom. I could not express genuine tenderness, affection, various other things. I thought there is something wrong with an art form that limits. It was then I began to have suspicion. I'm quite content, however, to say, look, it no longer suited me.

Whatever the motive, the results saw a steep decline in Meale's reputation. Modernists expecting constant innovation were dismayed to find Meale's style stuck somewhere between Debussy and Messiaen. Others, however, saw Meale as espousing "post-modern romanticism and lyricism".

==== Operas ====
Meale is best known in this later period for the 1986 opera Voss, with a libretto by David Malouf based on the novel of the same title by Patrick White. White knew and admired Meale, but thought his treatment of the novel insufficiently "austere and gritty". Malouf also collaborated with Meale on his second operatic project, Mer de glace (1986–91), a tableaux-like juxtaposition of some ideas of the novel Frankenstein with the dealings of Mary Shelley with Percy Bysshe Shelley and Lord Byron.

Both operas are critiques of Romantic grandiosity. Voss is a German explorer of Australia, the unknown continent, confident that idealism will lead him to its heart. He forms a spiritual bond across time and space with Laura, an English spinster in Sydney able to follow his journey through sheer power of empathy. In the score of Voss, Meale quotes tinny piano dances to show the unknowingness of Sydney's 19th-century colonial society; this has the bracing effect of setting Meale's orchestration on the side of Voss's vain metaphysical ambitions. Use of a tonal idiom allows Meale exceptional freedom to quote with distancing, parody and irony snatches and patches of 19th-century music: a mock German Lied for Voss's cultural arrogance; a ripping parody of Violetta's waltz scene in La traviata for Laura's social isolation.

In Mer de glace the poet Shelley – scientist Frankenstein in fantasy – creates a man but botches the job. He is driven mad by the creature's demand to be loved. Systematically Meale sets the key of A minor for reality against the key of B-flat minor for madness – the two keys almost completely dividing the diatonic sound-world between them. The music refers often to Debussy (Nocturnes and Pelléas et Mélisande), Delius (On Hearing the First Cuckoo in Spring) and Wagner (Tristan and Siegfried). Critics thus heard Meale as increasingly "derivative", though more recently Meale as an opera composer appears as a post-modernist contemporary of John Adams, fitting a narrative to the music of its era. Shelley himself is given a Siegfried-like Heldentenor part and his creature a Fafner-like grossness to match; but the would-be Siegfried of Mer de glace is reduced to moral nullity by his failure to take responsibility.

When Mer de glace was written Mahler was at the height of his fame as a composer. The opera seems to end with an invitation to the audience to join in a timeless Mahlerian Abschied to its story. But Malouf and Meale administer a Brechtian parting slap: what about persisting cruelties to women and children?

=== Wilsons Creek 1988–2000 ===
Meale felt that the ethos of the university had changed; he had lost the desire and the right to be listened to by his students. At the same time he wanted solitude to work on Mer de glace. He left Adelaide in 1988 and moved to a rambling house in a rainforest at Wilsons Creek on the NSW north coast. Mer de glace was first performed, and acclaimed, in Sydney in 1991, though Meale thought it needed revision. There are also instrumental works from that time, some of them, like Symphony No. 1, conscious exercises in style. But others – for instance Three Miró Pieces – continue Meale's illumination of other artists' work and his passion for Spain.

For years after he went up there I would get postings of how he was going; increasingly isolated, increasingly alcoholic, increasingly shambolic; lost in the beautiful world of the imagination and creativity we had all once sought as the only worthwhile path of human endeavour."

Most of Meale's communications with friends in that period were by telephone, mimicking Voss's disembodied communications with Laura in the opera.

=== Sydney 2000–2009 ===
On his visits to Sydney, Meale "stayed with music publisher and broadcaster Julie Simonds and her family, eventually residing there until 2007. Then he moved in with his niece Amanda [Meale] and her family in Frenchs Forest." Interviewed there as a sick old man, Meale insisted that truth to personal emotion in music could only be found through unconscious knowledge of musical culture. He alludes to Wittgenstein, contrasting an imposed formalism – atonalism like the Tractatus — with music as an embedded form of life – like the Philosophical Investigations.

He died in Sydney on 23 November 2009 at the age of 77.

== Table of works by Richard Meale ==
This table has been compiled from the website of the Australian Music Centre, from the Meale entry on the website of the Move label and from performance times given by Apple Music. The items have been checked against Graeme Skinner's published list and Michael Hannan's "List of Works", but work disowned by Meale has been omitted.

Name	Date	Instrumentation	Duration	Detail
Sonata for flute and piano	1960	Flute and piano	17 minutes	Four movements
Los Alboradas	1963	Chamber quartet	13 minutes	Three "morning songs" of the troubadors
Homage to Garcia Lorca	1964	Two equal chamber orchestras	17 minutes	Two versions, for small and large string ensembles.
Images (Nagautu)	1966	Orchestra	11 minutes	The nagauta form originated in Japanese Kabuki plays.
Nocturnes	1967	Orchestra with solo celeste, vibraphone and harp	18 minutes	1. Aphelion; 2. Nocturne I: Perigee; 3. Zenith; 4. Nocturne II: Eclipse; 5. Nadir; 6. Nocturne III: Apoge.
Very High Kings	1968	Orchestra	14 minutes	Section of the unfinished Mystical Voyage of Christopher Columbus.
Clouds now and then	1969	Orchestra	8 minutes	Haiku by Matsuo Bashō: clouds now and then/giving man relief/from moon-viewing.
Cicada (soon it will die)	1969	Orchestra	8 minutes	Haiku by Matsuo Bashō: soon it will die/yet no trace of this/in the cicada's screech.
Interiors/Exteriors	1970	Orchestra	24 minutes	There is a quintet version of this work for keyboard and percussion.
Variations	1970	Orchestra	14 minutes	
Coruscations	1971	Solo piano	8 minutes	Written for Roger Woodward.
Plateau for winds	1971	Wind quintet		Recorded by the Adelaide Wind Quintet for HMV.
Incredible Floridas (Homage to Rimbaud)	1971	Sextet	33 minutes	1. Prelude, "Voyelles"; 2. Interlude I, "Fêtes de la faim"; 3. Sonata I, "Le bateau ivre"; 4. Interlude II, "Phrases – Veillées – Génie; 5. Sonata II, "Une saison en enfer"; 6. Postlude, "Une saison en enfer" – Matin – Adieu.
Evocations	1973	Oboe with chamber orchestra	20 minutes	Written for Paul Sacher and Heinz Holliger.
String quartet No. 1	1974	String quartet	18 minutes	Two movements: players face to face, then far apart.
Viridian	1979	Orchestra	16 minutes	Three movements
String quartet No. 2	1980	String quartet	28 minutes	1. Tempo comodo; 2. Scherzo quasi una toccata; 3. Cantilena triste; 4. Ruvido; 5. Cantilena pacifica.
Voss	1979–1985	Opera from the novel by Patrick White	120 minutes	Two acts. Libretto by David Malouf.
Mer de glace	1986–1991	Opera in two acts with a prologue	132 minutes	Libretto by David Malouf. The Alpine glacier Mer de Glace figures in Mary Shelley's Frankenstein.
Scenes from Mer de Glace	1992	Orchestral suite	21 minutes	1.On the Mer de Glace; 2.Prelude: Lake Geneva; 3.Village dance; 4.Mary Shelley's nightmare. Voice parts substituted by oboe, trumpet, cor anglais and saxophone.
Symphony No. 1	1994	Orchestra	24 minutes	One movement.
String quartet No. 3	1995	String quartet	23 minutes	Four movements.
Mélisande	1996	Solo flute	7 minutes	A portrait of Mélisande in Debussy's opera Pelléas et Mélisande.
Lumen	1999	Sextet	7 minutes	
Palimpsest	1999	Sextet	19 minutes	1. Reverie; 2. Dance; 3. Threnody. An exploration of gamelan.
Arabesque	2001	Solo trumpet	7 minutes	Written for Meale's protegé and "adopted son" Matt Bailey, who played it at Meale's 2010 memorial concert in Sydney. Bailey mistakenly called Jack by Stapleton.
Three Miró Pieces	2002	Orchestra	20 minutes	Uses Miró's titles for his paintings: 1. Dog barking at the moon; 2. Cat's dancing lesson (Dutch interior II); 3. The nightingale's song at midnight and the morning rain
Intrada	2003	Organ, three trumpets and percussion	4 minutes	
Cantilena pacifica	2004	String orchestra	8 minutes	A version for solo violin and string orchestra of movement 5 of Meale's String quartet No. 2.
Concert monologue from Mer de glace	2006	Soprano and orchestra	19 minutes	Five scenes from the prologue and Act I made into a concert aria. Scenes 1, 2, 4 and 5 are in the part of Claire Clairemont, 3 of Shelley.

== Recordings ==
Most of Meale's work can be downloaded from Apple Music, Spotify, Amazon Music or YouTube. However, there are notable exceptions. Nocturnes, one of Meale's most highly praised works, and Cicada can be only bought on CDs from the Australian Music Centre. The opera Voss with its 1987 cast is available on YouTube with full score and subtitles supplemented by photos of the performance. A 480p-quality recording of the first and only performance of the opera Mer de Glace is available on YouTube but lacks video, subtitles or libretto. A recording of Meale's last orchestral work Three Miró Pieces is available from the Australian Music Centre for loan but not sale.

== Honours and awards ==
Meale was made a Member of the Order of the British Empire (MBE) in 1971 and a Member of the Order of Australia (AM) in 1985. He was elected an Honorary Fellow of the Australian Academy of the Humanities (FAHA) in 2000.

In 1996, Meale was awarded an honorary Doctor of Laws by the Australian National University. In 2000, he was conferred an honorary Doctor of Letters by the University of New England.

The Don Banks Music Award was established in 1984 to publicly honour a senior artist of high distinction who has made an outstanding and sustained contribution to music in Australia. In 1997, it was awarded to Meale.

At the 2002 Art Music Awards presented by the Australasian Performing Right Association (APRA) and the Australian Music Centre, Meale was presented with a special award for "Distinguished Services to Australian Music". He was the first person to receive such an award. At the 2003 awards, Meale's Three Miró Pieces was awarded best composition by an Australian composer; and orchestral work of the year.

== Bibliography ==
- Skinner, Graeme (1991). Richard Meale: list of works. Artarmon, NSW: Boosey & Hawkes (Australia). ISBN 064607329X.
- Sitsky, Larry (2005). Australian Piano Music of the Twentieth Century. Westport (CT): Praeger Publishers. ISBN 9780313322860.
- "Richard Meale – Abandoning Tonality" [radio interview with Andrew Ford]. 2008. In Talking to Kinky and Karlheinz – 170 musicians get vocal on The Music Show ed. Anni Heino, 263–268. Sydney: ABC Books. ISBN 978-0-7333-2008-8.
- Hannan, Michael (2014). The music of Richard Meale (First ed.). Kingsgrove, New South Wales: Wildbird Music. ISBN 978-0987115430. A good book in need of an index.
- Hooper, Michael (2021). Australian Music and Modernism, 1960–1975 (First ed.). New York: Bloomsbury. ISBN 978-1-5013-8146-1. Superficially this book has two chapters on Meale. Actually every chapter has extensive discussion of Meale. It also gives detailed analysis of scores: Clouds now and then for instance gets eight pages (pp. 82–9). The same work receives four pages from Hannan (pp. 121–4).
- Meale, Richard; de Berg, Hazel (interviewer) (1965). [Richard Meale interview sound recording], National Library of Australia.
