= The Handmaid's Tale (opera) =

1998 opera by Poul Ruders

The Handmaid's Tale is a 1998 opera by Danish composer Poul Ruders, setting a libretto by Paul Bentley based on the novel of the same name by Margaret Atwood. It has a prologue, a prelude, two acts and an epilogue; there is a build-up in each act leading to a big scene. The work premiered in Copenhagen in 2000 and has since been produced in London, Toronto and elsewhere. Bentley's libretto converts a first-person novel into a third-person opera by means of framing devices. The action takes place in a 22nd-century United States taken over by a theocracy named Gilead; it starts with a newsreel-like collage: the narrative first frame.

== Background ==
The 21st-century North American society is depicted as one with great suffering and injustice in The Handmaid's Tale. Ecological and political disruption lead to the dismantling of the United States by a theocracy which takes over to create the new country of Gilead.

The structure of the opera is divided into two parts, which was librettist Paul Bentley's intention. Ruders offered that his basic structure contained a build-up in the acts which lead to a big scene. In act 1, the big scene is "Birth", in act 2 it is "Death", and the conclusion is quiet and tense. The opera's final structure includes a prelude, act 1, act 2, and an epilogue.

Rather than beginning the opera in a usual way following the conductor's lead, the opera opens with a newsreel-like collage showing a sequence of many disasters to give a historical frame to the narrative. There is an underlying goal of highlighting similarities between the Gilead experience in this century and Iran's theocratic experience in the previous century, and the setting of the opera takes place at an academic conference far after Gilead has fallen.

== Synopsis ==
Prologue

In AD 2195, the 12th Symposium on the Republic of Gilead is meeting via video conference. The republic was formed after Christian fundamentalists assassinated the president and most of the congress in order to establish a dictatorship based on biblical principles within the United States. Women in the republic have no suffrage, right to work, right to education, or right to property. Women who live in sin are taken to Red Centres where they are indoctrinated as handmaids by "aunts". The handmaids are sent to barren households, where they are required to be ritually inseminated once a month. Professor Pieixoto introduces an audio-cassette recorded by a handmaid who is in hiding. She had been taken from her second husband Luke and their daughter.

Red Centre Prelude

The centre is run by Aunt Lydia. Moira, a friend of the handmaid who recorded the tape, is captured after an escape attempt. Janine, another woman at the centre, suffers a breakdown. Moira eventually manages to escape while other handmaids graduate from the centre.

Here the Red Centre showcases the multiple practices of indoctrination, which leads to Offred being posted to the home of a higher-up commander. The handmaids are taught a new set of rules based on the Ten Commandments.

Act 1

The handmaid is assigned to a new posting under the command of Fred. She is therefore known as Offred (Of Fred). The wife of the household is Serena Joy, a former gospel singer. Offred and Ofglen, another handmaid, go shopping where they encounter the pregnant Janine. A doctor offers to impregnate Offred, but she declines in fear. At her new posting, the handyman Nick and Fred both have illegal contact with Offred when they talk to her and approach her bedroom. The household gathers for the ritual impregnation, and Nick tells Offred that Fred wants to see her privately afterwards, which is also illegal.

Instead of treating Offred as a sexual surrogate, the commander finds himself attracted to her, which is an unpardonable sin leading to much of the disaster throughout the story.

The next day, the birth of Janine's child prompts all the wives and handmaids of the district to gather in celebration. Offred visits Fred that night in private, and once she is back in her bedroom, she collapses in a fit of hysterical laughter. This is Offred's way of acknowledging the hopelessness of her situation after the commander makes her kiss him "as if she meant it", as well as a way to represent a woman's response to the experience of Gilead as a whole. The inconclusive ending of act 1 foreshadows the ending of act 2.

Act 2

Rita discovers Offred the next morning on the floor of her room. Offred visits Fred again in private, and during their next ritual, he caresses Offred. She fears that Serena Joy will notice the tender gesture. During another round of shopping, Offred and Ofglen confide that they are both breaking the law, as Ofglen talks about the resistance movement. Janine joins them before breaking down again, as a result of the execution of her defective child. Janine is taken off for execution.

Offred continues to see Fred privately. Serena Joy tries to bribe Offred into a union with Nick by showing her a photo of Offred's missing daughter. Offred and Nick begin an affair. At a public execution, the Handmaids are given the opportunity to hang a "rapist", who is part of the underground. Ofglen kicks him into unconsciousness in order to spare him the pain of hanging. Meanwhile, Serena Joy discovers Offred's affair with Fred. The "Eyes of God", the secret police, arrest Offred.

Epilogue

In the video conference context, Professor Pieixoto asks for any questions, prompting the end of the opera with the lights turning on in the theatre. Professor Pieixoto reveals that no one knows what happened to Offred.

== Style ==
The opera is written in a free tonal style, with clear influences from the operas of Alban Berg and from minimalism. The musical style is narrative rather than lyric, but Offred does have two full arias, several mini-arias, a beautiful and moving duet with her younger self, and she is one of the quartet at the climax of the opera.

Much of the rather haunting atmosphere is built from the repetitive, chanting, choruses of the handmaids.

== Performances and recordings ==
The opera was premiered in Copenhagen on 6 March 2000 by the Danish Royal Opera, conductor Michael Schonwandt, director Phyllida Lloyd, designer Peter McKintosh. It was subsequently recorded by the same company by Dacapo, currently the only recording of the opera in the catalogue.

The Danish production translated Bentley's libretto from English to Danish, which can be heard on the CD recording. This CD recording was then nominated for two Grammy Awards and received the Cannes Classical Award for the best work by a living composer in 2002.

This production transferred to the English National Opera in London's Coliseum Theatre on 3 April 2003 and ran for seven performances between 3 April and 2 May 2003.

The opera's North American premiere was performed by the Minnesota Opera in May 2003, in a new production, conducted by Anthony Walker, director Eric Simonson, designer Robert Israel, and ran there for five performances between 10 and 18 May 2003. The Danish Royal Opera production transferred to Canadian Opera Company in Toronto, Margaret Atwood's home town, on 23 September 2004.

In October 2018 Gertrude Opera mounted a production for the Yarra Valley Opera Festival in Melbourne, Australia. Director Linda Thompson, conductor Patrick Burns, designer Joseph Noonan.

Boston Lyric Opera (BLO) mounted a production in May 2019, conducted by BLO music director David Angus, director Anne Bogart, designer James Scheutte.

In April 2022 the ENO presented a new production with Annilese Miskimmon directing and Joana Carneiro conducting. The designer was Annemarie Woods. This production returned to the London Coliseum in February 2024.

In October 2022 the Royal Danish Opera mounted a new production in Copenhagen; the director was John Fulljames, the conductor Jessica Cottis, the designer Chloe Lamford.

Glow Lyric Theatre in Greenville, South Carolina, presented the opera during its summer festival season in July 2023.

The German premiere was on 28 June 2024 at the Theater Freiburg: director Peter Carp, conductor Ektoras Tartanis, set design Kaspar Zwimper, costumes Gabriele Rupprecht. The San Francisco Opera gave the work in September/October 2024. This was a co-production with the Royal Opera in Copenhagen, and as in 2022 it was directed by John Fulljames.

In March 2026, the Detroit Opera presented a new production with Brenna Corner directing and Marit Strindlund conducting.

== Critical reception ==
Critical reception to the opera's Copenhagen world premiere was very positive. Anthony Tommasini, writing for the New York Times, said of The Handmaid's Tale to "add it to the list of recent works that the Metropolitan Opera should feel obliged to present." In London, the reviews were mixed, and many hostile. While the power of Atwood's story and skill of Bentley's libretto were recognized, some critics felt that the vocal writing was characterless and for some female characters too shrill and highly pitched to allow for proper diction, while the orchestral writing was judged by some to be bombastic. Others praised Ruders for his composition's sympathy to the spirit of the novel. The Minnesota and Toronto premieres were widely praised by the critics.

Both the first Copenhagen and London seasons, and the later productions in America and Canada, were successes with the opera-going public, with houses consistently selling out.

Denmark's Queen Margrethe II attended the performance every month for four months when the opera premiered in 2000.

== Language ==
The Handmaid's Tale was from the beginning composed for Paul Bentley's English libretto alongside Ruders' Danish translation of the libretto. The Danish title was Tjenerindens fortælling.

The Danish Royal Opera who commissioned the work wanted the opera performed in Danish, but performances outside Denmark have all been sung in English.

== Music ==
With the challenge of reflecting the complexity and discomfort of the novel, Ruders' music accurately represents the emotions depicted in the novel. The music alternates between harsh dissonances and sections of religious devotion, suggesting the brutal theocracy of Gilead. The dramatic points of the opera are illustrated by Ruders' rigid, metallic score. Some might see the music as dry and overly dissonant, but it sets a compelling environment for the story. Ruders uses extravagant lyrics for the love scenes in both Offred's affair in Gilead and in her memories. In contrast, he utilizes a unique blend of wolf-whistles and shrieks to show an opposite emotion in a scene where a doctor offers to impregnate her, while in another scene at an undercover brothel has a more upbeat, cabaret-like score.

Offred Suite is an arrangement by the composer, Poul Ruders, in which five of Offred's arias are interwoven with orchestral interludes from the opera, and the suite ends, as does the opera, with a postlude for full orchestra. It has been recorded by Bridge Records. The CD includes Ruders' Tundra and his Symphony No. 3 Dream Catcher.

== Adaptation from novel to Opera ==
The conversion of a highly complex first-person narrative into a third-person opera was a significantly difficult task that Bentley faced when creating the opera. Through his moving and faithful libretto, Bentley solved the problem of converting the novel into a coherent and effective opera. As he had to simplify the events of the novel, he chose to keep the separation scene of Offred from her husband, Luke, and their child. The reasoning for this is that it stands as a dividing line between the time before and the present. Bentley's effective libretto illustrates the consequences that come from constructing a world of ritual repression while also showing a compelling representation of both Offred's present and past lives.

In contrast with the novel, where the reader discovers at the end that the text is meant to be a reconstruction of a 200-year-old text from multiple cassette tapes, the opera's video conference taking place in the year 2195 shown in the Prologue and Epilogue frames the work from the beginning while also distancing it.

With the novel's first-person narration, the account we witness is personal and intimate based on the main character's own experience. Through this approach, the subjectivity of the narrative is apparent because the story only has direct insight into one person's perspective rather than revealing the thoughts and intentions of other characters. The direct, objective storytelling nature of theatrical opera opens the story to the audience as eyewitnesses to the events happening on stage. Rather than perceiving the events through the filter of the main character, the audience has a chance to create their own perceptions.

There is a clear distinction between reality and fiction in the production. Opening the opera and introducing the audience to the setting of an academic conference, crossing the threshold into the conference hall, acts as a surprise that can be compared to the surprise of the novel's ending. Crossing over between the distinctions of the opera auditorium and the numerous settings of fictionalized space prompts the audience to raise questions of dramatic genres and to also question the relationship between fiction and reality. The framing device being placed at the beginning of the opera places the core story in a delicate position with several layers of reality that overlap each other. This position highlights the subjective angle and underlines the problems of the relationship between reality and fiction.
