= Peggy Glanville-Hicks Address =

The Peggy Glanville-Hicks Address is an annual forum for ideas relating to the creation and performance of Australian music. It was named for the Australian composer Peggy Glanville-Hicks.

From 1999 until 2018, the Peggy Glanville-Hicks Address was managed by the New Music Network. Since 2019, the event has been managed by the Australian Music Centre.

== Lecturers ==
- 1999: James Murdoch
- 2000: Barry Conyngham AM
- 2001: Liza Lim AM
- 2002: Roland Peelman AM
- 2003: John Davis
- 2004: Julian Burnside AO
- 2005: Richard Mills AM
- 2006: Daryl Buckley
- 2007: Jon Rose
- 2008: Sandy Evans
- 2009: Robyn Archer AO
- 2010: Simone Young AM
- 2011: Lyndon Terracini AM
- 2012: Michael Kieran Harvey
- 2013: Genevieve Lacey
- 2014: Warren Burt
- 2015: Richard Gill AO
- 2016: Nicole Canham
- 2017: Kim Williams AM
- 2018: Cat Hope
- 2019: Deborah Cheetham AO
- 2020: Madeleine Flynn and Tim Humphrey;
  Sunny Kim
- 2021: Sia Ahmad, Bree van Reyk, Zela Margossian
- 2022: Anita Collins and William Barton
- 2023: Elena Kats-Chernin AO
- 2024: Nat Bartsch
- 2025: Marshall McGuire
- 2026: Benjamin Northey
