= Moritz von Bomhard =

American classical composer

- Born: Heinrich Hans Claus Moritz von Bomhard; 9 June 1908; Munich, Germany
- Died: 23 July 1996 (aged 88); Salzburg, Austria
- Occupations: conductor; opera producer; composer

Moritz von Bomhard (9 June 1908 – 23 July 1996) was a German-born conductor, opera producer, composer, and pianist. Educated in Leipzig, he settled in the United States in 1935 and became an American citizen in 1942. Bomhard was the founder of the Kentucky Opera which he managed and conducted from its inception in 1952 until his retirement in 1982.

== Early life ==
Bomhard was born in Munich, one of the three children of Johanna and Ernst von Bomhard, an industrial engineer. He was educated in law at the University of Leipzig but also received a diploma in music from the Leipzig Conservatory. There he met Leila Atkinson a Kentucky-born cellist who was to become his first wife. In 1935 they settled in New York, where Bomhard studied conducting on a fellowship at the Juilliard School. In 1937 he took up a teaching position at Princeton University, which included conducting both the university's orchestra and glee club. During his time at Princeton he composed three symphonies, a concerto for strings, and pieces of chamber, piano, and vocal music. He also supplemented his income by coaching singers and choral groups and teaching piano privately.

Bombard became an American citizen in 1942 and served in the US Army during World War II. Leila died in 1945 after suffering severe mental illness which had confined her to a hospital. After the war, Bomhard studied at Columbia Teachers College, receiving his master's degree in 1947. However, he did not take up a formal teaching career. Instead he formed a small professional opera troupe called Opera for College (later renamed New Lyric Stage). The troupe travelled around the Eastern United States performing at colleges that had no opera departments of their own. He also composed incidental music for Margo Jones's regional theatre productions and served as composer-arranger for the Philharmonic Piano Quartet.

== Forging a career in opera ==
In 1949, Fletcher Smith, who had studied with Bomhard at Juilliard and was then head of the Voice Department at the University of Louisville, invited him to produce an opera to be performed by the students there. Bombard chose The Marriage of Figaro, and it proved to be a great success. Bomhard returned in 1950 and 1951 to produce Menotti's The Old Maid and the Thief and Puccini's Gianni Schicchi. Their box-office success following on from that of The Marriage of Figaro led him to disband his New Lyric Stage troupe and settle in Louisville where he and a group of Louisville citizens founded the Kentucky Opera Association in 1952. Later called Kentucky Opera, it was the city's first professional opera company and the twelfth oldest regional opera company in the United States.

He soon formed a partnership with the Louisville Philharmonic Society orchestra for the fledgling company to produce and record five new operas in English commissioned by the orchestra. One of these was Peggy Glanville-Hicks's The Transposed Heads which premiered in April 1954 conducted by Bomhard. He wrote a German translation of the Transposed Heads libretto for a possible performance in Germany. She thought he looked like John Barrymore. They became lovers and travelled to Europe together in the summer of 1954. Glanville-Hicks broke off the affair the following summer. In her letter to him of 8 August 1955 she blamed the fact that she was more in love with him than he with her and his dalliance with the soprano who had created the role of Sita in Transposed Heads.

Apart from 1960 to 1961, when he took a leave of absence to work at the Hamburg State Opera, Bomhard managed Kentucky Opera continuously until his retirement in 1982. In the early years of the company when it had an annual budget of only $10,000 to produce three operas, Bomhard not only conducted the performances, but was also the stage director and répétiteur and designed and helped build the sets. He also travelled to New York to scout young singers who showed great promise but did not yet command high salaries. He brought the 26-year-old Tatiana Troyanos to Kentucky Opera to sing her first ever Carmen in 1964. In the 1960s and early 1970s Bomhard concurrently taught at the University of Louisville music school, produced an annual opera for Memphis Opera Theatre in Tennessee, and produced and hosted two cultural series for WAVE television and radio.

== Later years ==
In 1963 Bombard had married the mezzo-soprano Charme Riesley. She sang Cherubino in his 1949 production of The Marriage of Figaro at Louisville and performed with Kentucky Opera both before and after their marriage. She appeared in Ariadne auf Naxos in December 1981, Bombard's last production for the company, and in 1983 accompanied him to the opening of the Kentucky Center for the Arts, whose Moritz von Bomhard Theater was named in his honor. Charme died in 1984 at the age of 55 after a long illness. According to The Encyclopedia of Louisville, her death was "a blow from which he never really recovered." In 1994, Bomhard left Louisville for Europe to be near his only remaining relatives, a niece and nephew. He settled in Salzburg, Austria in January 1995 and died there on 23 July 1996 at the age of 88. He is buried in the Von Bombard family tomb in Munich.
