= Riley Lee =

American-born Australian-based shakuhachi player and teacher

Riley Kelly Lee (born 1951) is an American-born Australian-based shakuhachi player and teacher. In 1980 he became the first non-Japanese person to attain the rank of Dai Shihan (grand master) in the shakuhachi tradition. He is a recipient of two of the most revered lineages of shakuhachi playing, descending from the original Zen Buddhist "priests of nothingness" of the Edo period (1600-1868 CE). His first teachers were Hoshida Ichizan II and Chikuho Sakai II. A later teacher was Katsuya Yokoyama.

== Personal life ==
Riley Lee was born in Plainview, Texas, of a Chinese father and Caucasian mother. He moved to Shawnee, Oklahoma, in 1957 aged six. He played bass in the rock band The Workouts when he was 13. The family moved to Hawaii in 1966, where as a high school student, Lee first heard the shakuhachi on an LP record that his elder brother brought home. About the same time, his father gave him a dongxiao, a Chinese bamboo flute whose ancestry is shared with the shakuhachi, and taught him an old Chinese folksong on it.

Lee first went to Japan in 1970, and returned in 1971, when he began his shakuhachi studies and lived there full-time until 1977.

== Career ==
From 1973 through 1977, he toured internationally as a full-time performer of taiko (festival drums) and shakuhachi with Ondekoza (now called Kodo), a group of traditional Japanese musicians. They performed with the Boston Symphony Orchestra and other groups, and at venues such as the Kennedy Center, London's Roundhouse Theatre, Espace Pierre Cardin in Paris, and the Boston Symphony Hall.

After returning to Honolulu with his wife Patricia in 1978, he began teaching privately and performing. He founded the Chikuho School of Shakuhachi of Hawaii. He also lectured shakuhachi at the University of Hawaii, where he gained his BA and MA degrees. The couple left for Australia in 1986 for Lee to take up a PhD fellowship in ethnomusicology on the transmission of the Zen Buddhist repertoire of the shakuhachi at the University of Sydney. His doctoral dissertation is published by UMI (USA). He was an East-West Center grantee in 1985-1986 and a Japan Foundation fellow in 1988–1989. He was made an Honorary Fellow of the University of Western Sydney in 1997. He has published scholarly articles and book reviews in leading national and international musicology journals, such as Ethnomusicology and Asian Music. Fluent in Japanese, he translates for journals such as Contemporary Music Review.

Lee was instrumental in creating a professional presence of traditional Japanese music in Australia. He introduced the shakuhachi to diverse audiences as both a soloist and with other performers of instruments including harp, cello, saxophone, tabla, guitar, didgeridoo, and symphony orchestra. He helped found the Australian Shakuhachi Society in 1996. His request in 1988 to the Sawai Koto School in Japan to have a koto player sent to Australia facilitated Satsuki Odamura's migration to Australia.

In 1995, with Ian Cleworth, he co-founded TaikOz, a Japanese festival drum group based in Australia. It has since become one of Australia's premier performance groups, acclaimed both at home and in Japan. He performed with the Sydney Dance Company in the 1999 Australian season of Graham Murphy's Air and Other Invisible Forces, touring the US at the end of 2000 and Europe in 2001 with the production.

He has made over 50 recordings internationally, many featuring his own compositions.

On 1 January 2000, Lee was seen, with five other musicians, on an internationally televised program, ushering in the new millennium from the top of the sails of the Sydney Opera House. In 2002 and 2003, he performed in Hawaii, New Mexico, Texas, California, England, Austria, Switzerland, and Japan, and gave numerous concerts throughout Australia, as well as in the Woodford and National Folk Festivals, Adelaide Festival, and the Sacred Music Festival in Brisbane. In 2003, he was Visiting Fellow at Princeton University, New Jersey, the first shakuhachi player ever to be so honoured. He received a second Fellowship at Princeton, to lecture in the Comparative Literature Department in 2009.

Lee was the artistic director and chair of the executive committee of the World Shakuhachi Festival 2008, a four-day event in 2008, at the Sydney Conservatorium of Music and the City Recital Hall. The event of 30 concerts, workshops, forums, seminars and other events featured 70 of the world's leading shakuhachi players, making it the largest event in the history of the shakuhachi.

With TaikOz and Synergy, he performed Gerard Brophy's The Book of Clouds, a work commissioned by the Melbourne Symphony Orchestra. He has also appeared and recorded with the harpist Marshall McGuire.

== Innovations ==
Riley Lee started teaching breathing workshops in the late 1980s, at the suggestion of one of his students, the Sydney acupuncturist Ross Penman. Riley has since refined and expanded his repertoire of exercises, gleaned from a number of sources and from his long and focused relationship with shakuhachi. The exercises are designed to create an awareness of one's breath while at the same time, improve the strength and control of muscles used in breathing. His workshops last from one to six hours, and single sessions have been attended by as many as 2,000 people.

== Personal life ==
The Lees have twin daughters, Aiyana and Marieke, born in 1979 in Kahuku, Oahu. The family have homes in both Sydney and Hawaii.

== Awards and nominations ==
=== APRA Awards ===
- 2009 Outstanding Contribution by an Individual win for his work on the 2008 World Shakuhachi Festival.

Year	Nominated works	Award	Result
1999	"Fhir An Bhata" with Sean O'Boyle and Queensland Symphony Orchestra	Most Performed Children's Work	Nominated

=== ARIA Music Awards ===
The ARIA Music Awards is an annual awards ceremony that recognises excellence, innovation, and achievement across all genres of Australian music. They commenced in 1987.

Year	Nominee / work	Award	Result	Ref.
2000	Spring Sea (with Marshall McGuire)	Best World Music Album	Nominated	
