= The Transposed Heads (opera) =

- Opera by Peggy Glanville-Hicks
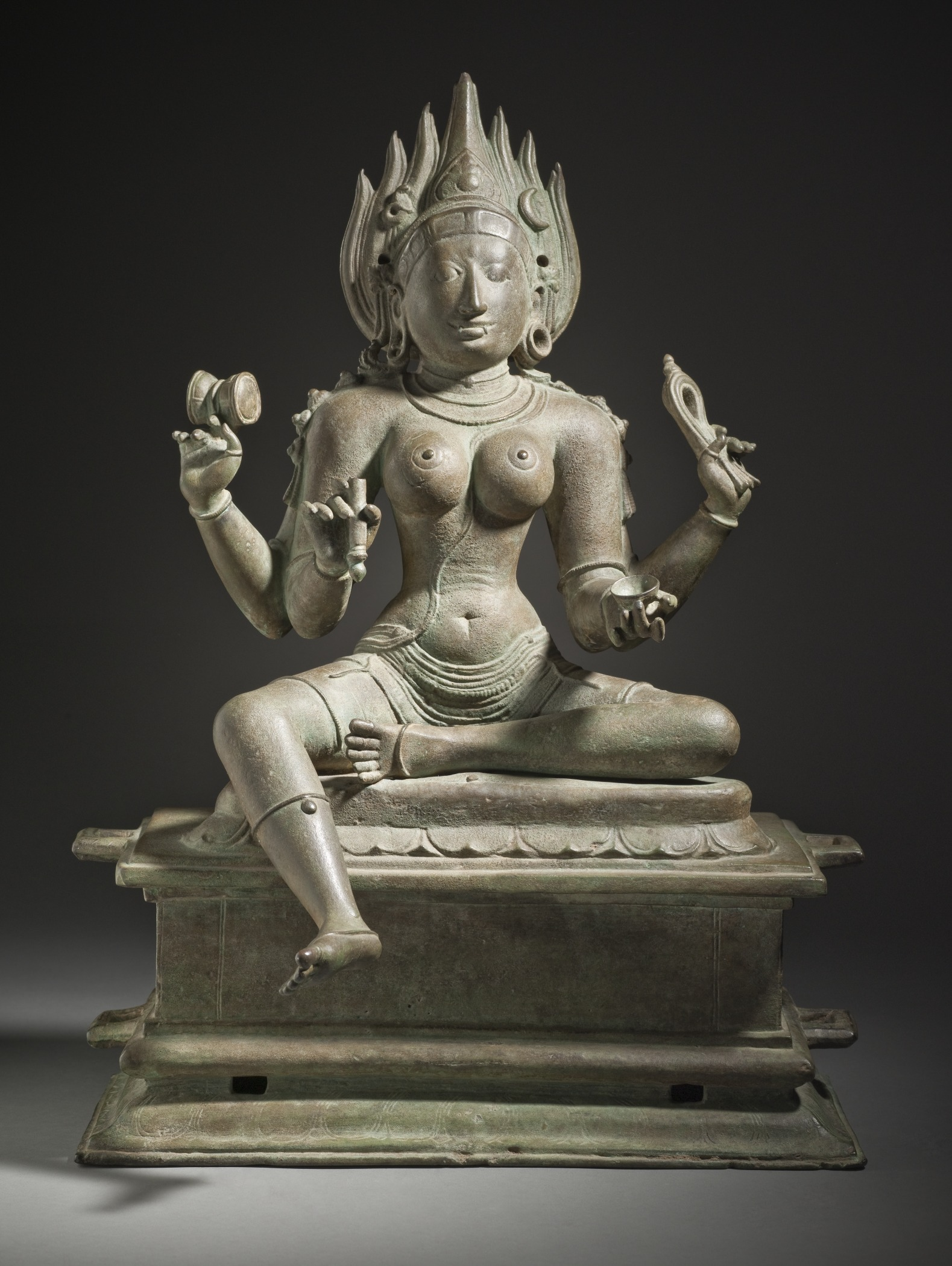
- The goddess Kali whose transposition of the male protagonists' heads leads to tragedy
- Librettist: Peggy Glanville-Hicks
- Language: English
- Based on: The novella Die vertauschten Köpfe by Thomas Mann
- Premiere: 3 April 1954; Columbia Auditorium, Louisville, Kentucky

The Transposed Heads is an opera in one act with six scenes composed by Peggy Glanville-Hicks. She also wrote the libretto which was adapted from Lowe-Porter's English translation of Thomas Mann's novella, Die vertauschten Köpfe. It was a commission from the Louisville Philharmonic Society and premiered on 3 April 1954 at the Columbia Auditorium in Louisville, Kentucky. (Note: Some sources, e.g. Griffel (2012), give the date of the premiere as 4 April. However, in addition to The New Grove Dictionary of Opera, both Rogers (2009) and the Louisville Courier-Journal give 3 April as the date of the premiere.)

Set in India, the story centers on the love triangle between Sita, her husband Shridaman, and Shridaman's friend Nanda. During a fraught episode in a temple to Kali, each of the male protagonists beheads himself. Kali brings them back to life but with the heads on the wrong bodies. Living with the mix-up ultimately results in Shridaman and Nanda committing suicide again and Sita throwing herself on their joint funeral pyre.

== Background ==
The Transposed Heads was Glanville-Hicks's first attempt at a full length opera. It was the result of a $4000 commission from the Louisville Philharmonic Society with extra funding from the Rockefeller Foundation. She wrote the libretto herself, by her own admission basing it virtually verbatim on Lowe-Porter's English translation of Thomas Mann's 1940 novella, Die vertauschten Köpfe. However, she shortened it considerably and eliminated some elements of the plot. Despite the ostensibly tragic nature of Mann's story, he told it in a tongue-in-cheek manner. Glanville-Hicks retained some of that element by making the guru Kamadamana and the goddess Kali comic figures and giving them speaking rather than singing roles.

Glanville-Hicks wrote in the programme notes for the premiere:

It was my aim to create a grand opera on a chamber music scale. The work is essentially a virtuoso piece for singers, the whole form and pacing coming from the vocal element as does the shape of a Baroque concerto from the vocal elaboration.

The score incorporates music from her 1935 Sinfonietta for Small Orchestra in D Minor and from Indian folk sources. According to Glanville-Hicks the use of Indian musical motifs did not require a significant change in her usual mode of composition:

Over a period of years I have gradually shed the harmonic dictatorship peculiar to modernists, and have evolved a melody-rhythm structure that comes very close to the musical patterns of the ancient world.

She composed the score over a period of four months, completing it in September 1953 in Port Antonio, Jamaica. While she was looking for a permanent summer house there, Errol Flynn's father Theodore let her use his son's yacht Zaca for her composing. During that time Glanville-Hicks and Theodore Flynn became lovers, and she dedicated The Transposed Heads to him. In the course of the opera's development, she had vacillated between structures of one, two, or three acts. She eventually settled on one act with six scenes. The total running time of the opera without intermissions is approximately 75 minutes.

== Performance history ==
The Transposed Heads premiered in a matinee performance at the Columbia Auditorium in Louisville, Kentucky on 3 April 1954 conducted by Moritz von Bomhard. It had a run of three performances ending on 24 April. The opera was also recorded by the Louisville Philharmonic Society and released on an LP which was subsequently played on radio stations across the United States. Its New York premiere came in 1958 in a production conducted by Carlos Surinach at the Phoenix Theatre where it ran for two performances under the auspices of the Contemporary Music Society. In his review of the New York premiere Howard Taubman wrote:

She [Glanville-Hicks] sets English well, and she writes attractively for the voice. But her Orientalisms become repetitious and bare before one is done with them, and this is a short opera."

In 1970, The Transposed Heads became the first major work of Glanville-Hicks to be premiered in her native Australia when it was performed by the University of New South Wales opera. It was staged again in 1986 at the Australian Festival when it was presented in a double-bill with her 1959 one-act opera The Glittering Gate.

== Roles ==
Role	Voice type	Premiere cast, 3 April 1954 (Conductor: Moritz von Bomhard)
Sita, a young and beautiful Indian woman	soprano	Audrey Nossaman
Shridaman, in love with Sita and later her husband	tenor	Monas Harlan
Nanda, Shridaman's friend and also in love with Sita	baritone	William Pickett
Kali, the Hindu goddess of both creation and destruction	speaking role (Note: In production, amplification is used for the goddess's voice to distinguish her from the human characters.)	Dwight Anderson
Kamadamana, a guru	speaking role	Robert Sutton
Villagers (men and women)

== Synopsis ==
Setting: Rural India in mythical times

Scene 1

Shridaman is a learned merchant with a noble face but a thin, weedy body. Nanda is a blacksmith with a strong and beautiful body but a rather ordinary intellect. Despite these differences, they are both friends. While out in the forest, they observe the beautiful Sita taking a ritual bath. Both are immediately smitten.

Scene 2

Several days later, Nanda finds Shridaman literally sick with love for Sita and despairing that she will ever marry him. Nanda volunteers to woo her on Shridaman's behalf and is successful.

Scene 3

Shridaman and Sita's wedding is celebrated in her village with much singing and dancing.

Scene 4

Shridaman, Sita, and Nanda journey home together after the wedding. Shridaman has noticed that Sita and Nanda have a strong attraction to each other. As they are passing through the forest, they come upon a temple to the goddess Kali. Shridaman goes inside to pray. In a fit of religious fervor he beheads himself to free Sita to marry Nanda. Nanda then enters the temple, and when he finds Shridaman's corpse, he realizes the motive for his friend's suicide. Overcome with remorse, Nanda likewise beheads himself.

Sita enters the temple and on discovering what has happened is about to hang herself. Kali appears. She tells Sita to place the heads back on the bodies and she will bring them both back to life. However, in her grief and agitation Sita places Nanda's head on Shridaman's body and vice versa. After Kali works her magic, each man now finds himself with his original head and identity but a new body.

Scene 5

At first the men profess to be happy with the new arrangement. Nevertheless, they decide to consult the guru Kamadamana as to which of the two men is actually her husband. Kamadamana determines that it is the one with the head of Shridaman. In his disappointment, Nanda becomes a religious recluse.

Scene 6

Several years have passed. Sita is pining for Nanda and seeks him out in his hermitage. Shridaman follows her there and confronts them. He proposes the only solution for a situation where a woman is simultaneously in love with one man's body and another man's head. They must "merge their separate essences in the universal whole." The two men commit suicide by simultaneously stabbing each other in the heart. Sita throws herself on the men's joint funeral pyre.

== Recordings ==
- The Transposed Heads – Monas Harlan (Shridaman); William Pickett (Nanda); Audrey Nossaman (Sita); Louisville Orchestra, Moritz Bomhard (conductor). Label: Louisville Philharmonic Society, LOU 545-6 (LP recorded 1954, released 1955)
- The Transposed Heads – Gerald English (Shridaman); Michael Leighton Jones (Nanda); Genty Stevens (Sita); Maggie King (Kali); Raymond Long (Kamadamana) West Australian Symphony Orchestra, David Measham (conductor). Label: ABC Classics, ABC 4810066 (CD recorded 1984, released 2012)
