= AIA Columbus =

AIA Columbus is a chapter of the American Institute of Architects. Founded in 1913, it is one of the largest urban components of the American Institute of Architects in the Midwestern United States, with members throughout Central and Southeastern Ohio.

The Columbus Chapter serves a 32-county area, including Ashland, Athens, Coshocton, Crawford, Delaware, Fairfield, Franklin, Gallia, Guernsey, Hocking, Jackson, Knox, Lawrence, Licking, Madison, Marion, Meigs, Monroe, Morgan, Morrow, Muskingum, Noble, Perry, Pickaway, Pike, Richland, Ross, Scioto, Union, Vinton, Washington, and Wyandot counties. The Chapter has approximately 600 members and affiliated members, and is the largest of seven components in the State of Ohio. It seeks to be the authoritative source for information on the built environment and to be the credible voice of the profession. The Chapter is headquartered in the capital city of Columbus, currently in the Center for Architecture and Design at 50 West Town Street, Suite 110, in the historic Lazarus Building.

== History ==
The Chapter was preceded by an organization called the Columbus Society of Architects, begun circa 1909, with Frank Packard as its president. The organization had 45 members, developed a sketch club among the city's draftsmen, and formed a committee for the purpose of establishing a connection with the Institute.

The location of the Chapter's Charter is currently unknown, therefore no verifiable evidence of the names of Charter Members exists. However, the 1914 Annuary, or directory of AIA Members, lists as a Fellow: Frank L. Packard, and as Members: C. W. Bellows, G. H. Bulford, A. A. Dole, F. W. Elliott, O. D. Howard, Carl Eugene Howell, Charles L. Inscho, C. E. Howell (duplicate), J. E. McCarty, Roy J. Merriam, C. E. Richards (né Clarence Earl Richards; 1864–1921), and J. W. Thomas Jr. In addition to the Institute Members, there were 18 Non-Institute or Chapter Members. Early Chapter Members on the Annual Reports to the Institute included Ralph Snyder and Otto C. Darst. This category of membership was abolished by Institute Convention in 1916.

The Chapter was originally organized as a For-Profit Corporation (prior to the establishment of Ohio's non-profit corporate laws) on May 7, 1913. The Chapter was chartered by the American Institute of Architects on May 21, 1913. On April 23, 1959, the chapter filed articles of incorporation as a Not For Profit Corporation with the Ohio secretary of state.

=== Foundation ===
In 1974, the Chapter established a 501(c)(3) organization to encourage knowledge, understanding and appreciation of the built environment of the Columbus, Ohio, metropolitan area; to produce a guide to its architectural heritage; to establish and maintain an archive for collecting and disseminating information relative to its development; and to receive and maintain funds relative to its exempt purposes. The original name was "Foundation of The Columbus Chapter of The American Institute of Architects" according to the original Articles of Incorporation accepted by the Secretary of State on December 4, 1974. The name was changed to "Columbus Architecture Foundation" on October 9, 1978. On August 1, 2011, the foundation began operating under the name "Center for Architecture and Design".

The first tangible project produced by the foundation was a coffee table book titled Architecture: Columbus, self-published in 1976. In 2008, a second publication titled The AIA Guide to Columbus was published by Ohio University Press.

== Organization ==
The location of the Chapter has changed but a few times over the years. The address listed on the Chapter's original Articles of Incorporation is 50 West Broad Street, Suite 2440, Columbus 15, Ohio. The building at this address is a 47-story structure built 1924–27, and was originally known as the American Insurance Union Citadel. Designed by C. Howard Crane of Detroit in the Art Moderne style, it is currently known as the LeVeque Tower. At the time of its construction, it was the tallest building in the state, and was known as the "first aerial lighthouse" in the country, as it served as a guide to aviators. The original Statutory Agent for the Chapter was listed as Hugh Wait.

In 1976, when the book Architecture: Columbus was published, the Chapter's offices were located at 1631 Northwest Professional Plaza, Columbus, Ohio 43220. These quarters were a more modest suburban style office complex. The Statutory Agent and executive director of the Chapter was Inez L. Kirby, Honorary AIA. For a period of time, Ms. Kirby served concurrently as executive director of the Columbus Chapter and the Architect's Society of Ohio, currently known as AIA Ohio, A Society of the American Institute of Architects.

In 1999, the Chapter relocated back into the downtown area, directly across West Broad Street from its original quarters. On the Subsequent Appointment of Agent form naming Amy M. Kobe, Honorary AIA,[Executive Director 1997–2004] as the Chapter's Statutory Agent, accepted by the Secretary of State on September 23, 1999, the address is listed as 21 West Broad Street, Suite 200, Columbus, Ohio 43215. The structure at this address is known as the Wyandotte Building, and was built 1894–97. Designed by Daniel Hudson Burnham, FAIA, the eleven story "Chicago School" Commercial Style structure is identified in Architecture: Columbus as the city's first steel-framed skyscraper. The Chapter initially occupied the smaller eastern half of the second floor, shared with two elevator shafts. A few years later, the office moved to the larger suite on the western side of the two-story atrium and elevator lobby, with Diane Deane [Executive Director 2004–2008] serving as executive director.

A decade later, on December 30, 2009, the chapter moved its offices to much larger quarters at 380 East Broad Street, Columbus, Ohio 43215. This building is a former automobile dealership (Byers Chrysler-Plymouth), and housed the first home of the Center for Architecture and Design. A juried design competition for the facility was administered by the Columbus Neighborhood Design Assistance Center in early 2009. The competition winner was Lincoln Street Studio. This space proved too ambitious for the capital campaign effort.

In December 2012, after a foundation-led capital campaign and four months of construction, the chapter and foundation moved into new quarters in the Lazarus Government Center operated by the Columbus Downtown Development Corporation (CDDC) at 50 West Town Street, Suite 110, Columbus Ohio. The foundation holds the lease with CDDC and subleases a pro-rated portion of the space to the chapter. The two organizations have a management agreement in place that structures the relationship and use of staff resources.

The Chapter's current executive director and Statutory Agent is Elizabeth Krile [Executive Director 2017 to present].

=== State component ===
In 1891, there was an Ohio Chapter of the AIA that reported 45 members, including 30 Fellows of the Institute, and described problems with competing with local chapters for membership. The chapter reported that it held one meeting a year. Included in the Fellows were J.M. Freese, H.A. Linthwaite, and Joseph W. Yost of Columbus. The report also indicated that G.H. Maetzel of Columbus died in the previous year. At the Annual Convention in 1892, J. W. Yost of Columbus offered a resolution requesting the Board of Directors to suggest to the local chapters that they endeavor to form state organizations that might advance the interests of architects in the various state legislatures. Mr. Yost's motion was seconded and referred to the Board of Directors.

The Chapter is affiliated with a state component currently known as AIA Ohio, A Society of the American Institute of Architects. It was previously called the Architect's Society of Ohio (ASO). The state component was formed shortly after the Chapter, and an item in The Ohio Architect Engineer and Builder identifies January 18 and 19 of 1916 at the Virginia Hotel in Columbus as the first annual meeting of the Ohio Association of Architects, originally organized as the Ohio Association of Chapters of the Institute. Officers included George M. Anderson of Cincinnati, president; C.W. Bellows of Columbus, vice president; and Herbert B. Briggs of Cleveland, secretary-treasurer. The first item of business for the new organization was to advise the Office Building Commission on engaging an advisor for a building proposed for the statehouse grounds. The state component describes itself as a federation of the seven AIA chapters in the state and continues to focus on legislative advocacy issues.

== See also ==
- Architecture of Columbus, Ohio
- Fellow of the American Institute of Architects
- Boston Society of Architects (BSA), A Chapter of the American Institute of Architects
