= Lazarus Building =

Commercial building in Columbus, Ohio

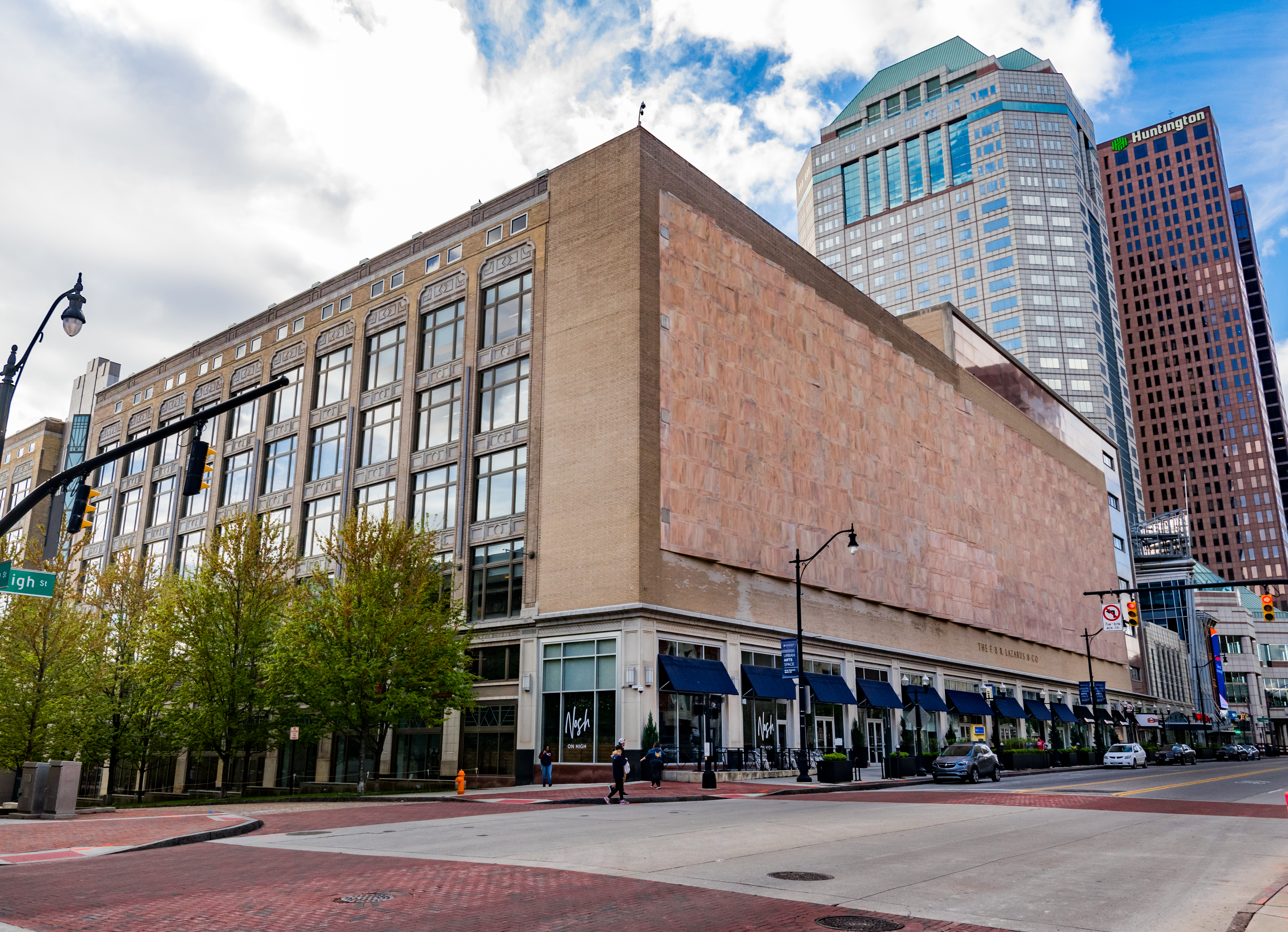
- View northwest from High Street
- Interactive map of the Lazarus Building area

General information
- Location: 141 S. High Street, Columbus, Ohio
- Coordinates: 39.95922°N 83.00063°W
- Opening: August 9, 1909

Technical details
- Floor area: 700,000 sq ft (65,000 m^{2})

Design and construction
- Architect: Richards, McCarty & Bulford

The Lazarus Building is a commercial building in Downtown Columbus, Ohio. It was the flagship store of the F&R Lazarus & Company, a department store founded nearby in 1851. The building, completed in 1909, housed the Lazarus department store until 2004, one year before its brand was retired. The building currently houses numerous state and county offices, the Ohio State University Urban Arts Space, and restaurants and a bank branch in its storefronts on High Street.

== Attributes ==
The present-day building has had many expansions and renovations, and today occupies much of a city block. It has five stories facing High Street, increasing to seven stories on Front Street. The West Town Street facade of the building is largely as originally built.

== History ==
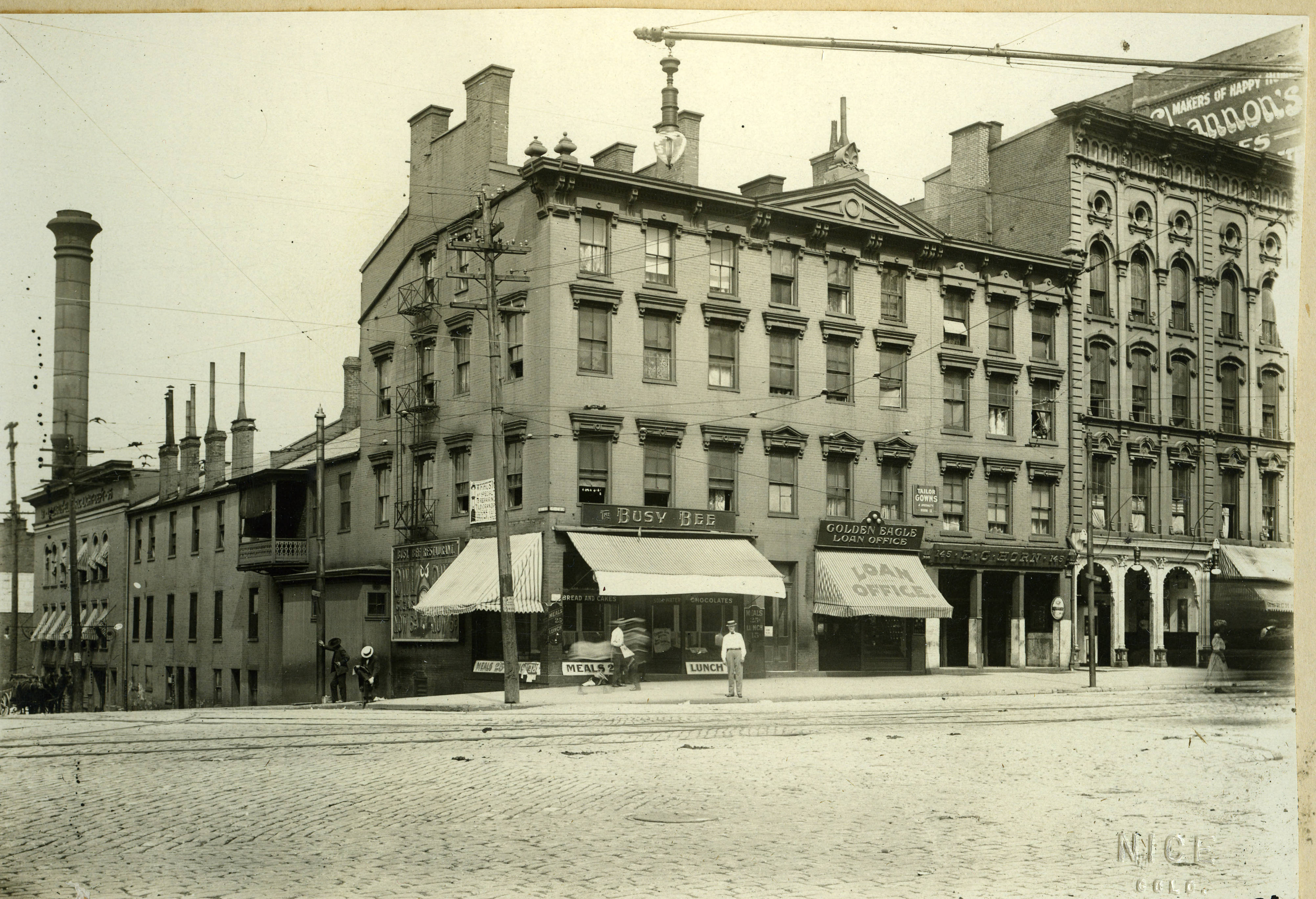
Building formerly on the corner of Town and High Streets, c. 1898-1909

F&R Lazarus & Company was founded nearby in 1851, possibly between Rich and Mound Streets. By 1858 it moved to the Parsons Building, at the southwest corner of Town and High streets. In 1909, the company moved to the current Lazarus Building, and moved from being predominantly a men's clothing store to a general department store. It was the first building in the city to feature an escalator, in 1909. The model was soon removed, but modern electric escalators were installed in 1947, another first for the city.

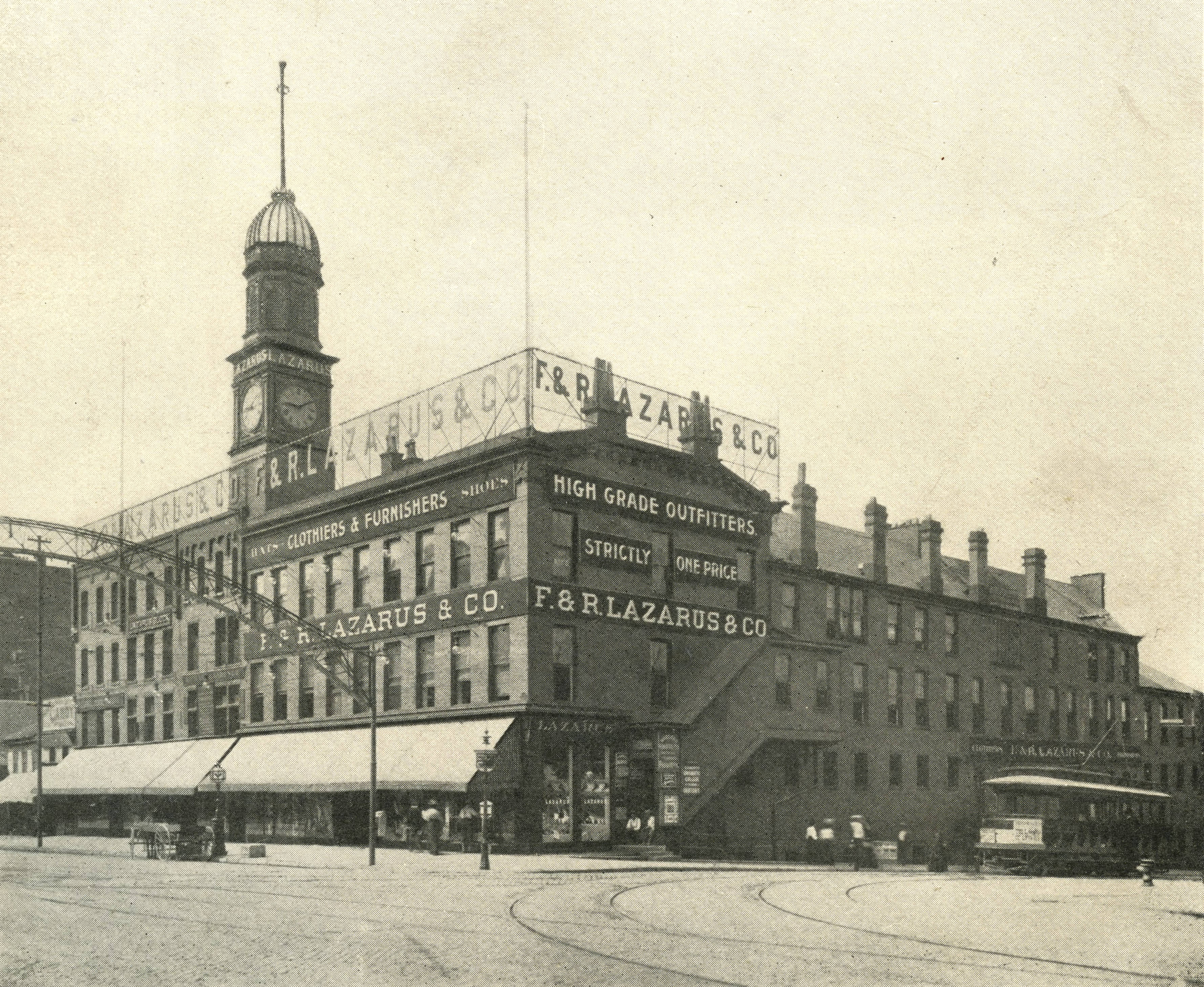
Prior home of the Lazarus store, one block south, 1901

One of the building's first additions was constructed in 1925; a new seven-story building west of the original structure, and originally joined to the main structure through pedestrian bridges over Wall Street. The new building was announced to be built in June 1925.

In 1989 the City Center Mall was opened across from the Lazarus Building (at the current site of the Columbus Commons). The mall duplicated many of the Lazarus store's items, though it helped support the already-foundering store. A pedestrian walkway was installed over High Street between the mall and the Lazarus store, forming it as one of the anchors of the mall. The department store closed in 2004. Its last decade had seen sales decline 60 percent. Its iconic sign was removed August 28, 2004. The store building was converted into a mixed-use space. A rooftop garden was installed to harvest water to cool the building. The building earned a LEED Gold rating following the renovations.

Much of the 700,000 sq ft (65,000 m^{2}) building is currently used for government offices, including the county economic development offices, and the Ohio Department of Medicaid, Ohio Department of Insurance, and Ohio Environmental Protection Agency. The Columbus Chamber of Commerce, Ohio State University Urban Arts Space, and AIA Columbus are located here as well. The city department of development was also located here until the completion of the Michael B. Coleman Government Center.

Every Christmastime from 1963 to 1990, the store's 50,000-gallon water tower on its roof was lit with string lights to resemble a Christmas tree. The tradition was postponed for two years during the 1970s energy crisis, and was discontinued in 1990 due to decreased visibility around modern high-rises.

The store was known for its window displays, especially during the holidays. Its highlight was the "big window" at Town and High streets.

== Gallery ==
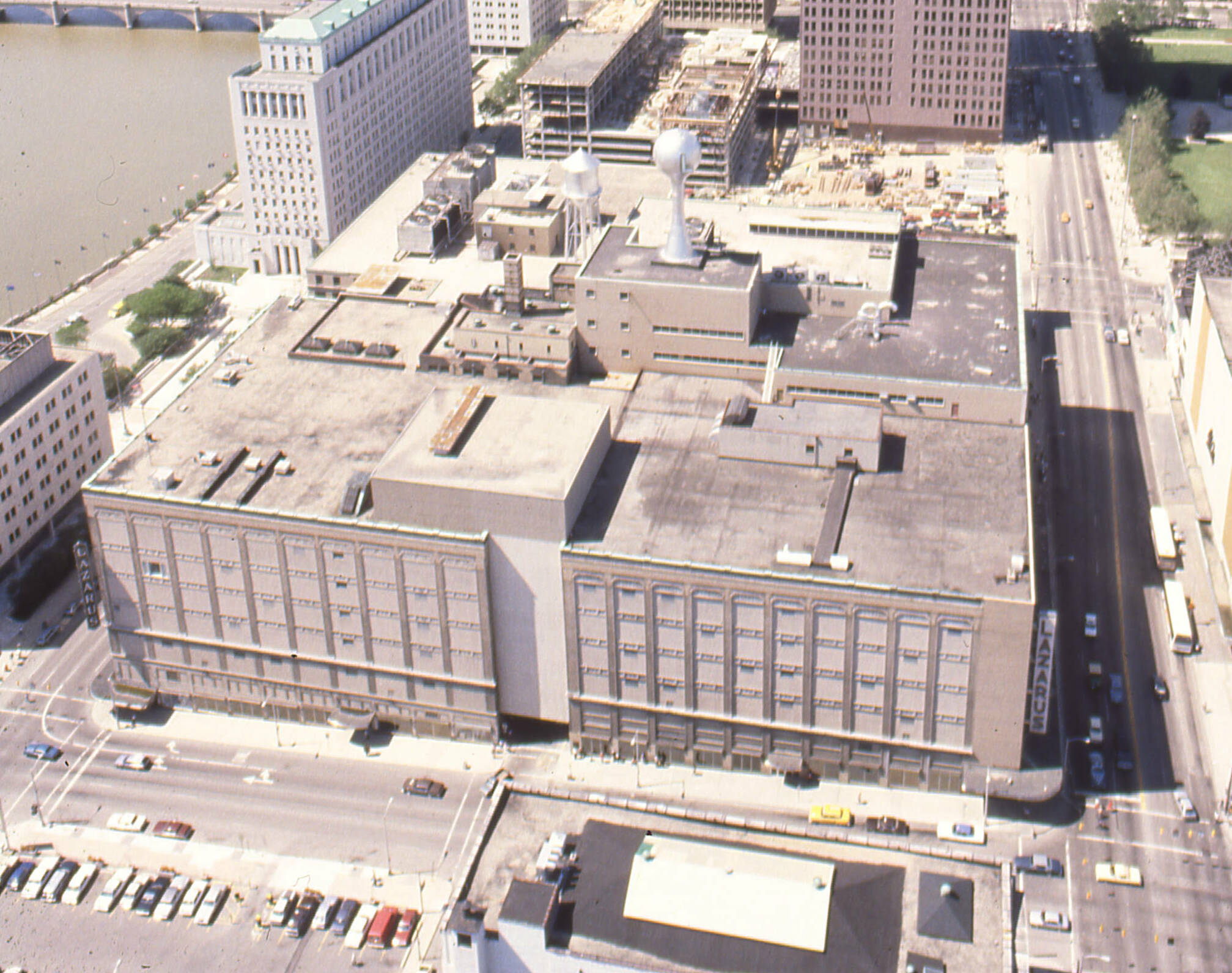
Aerial view, 1984

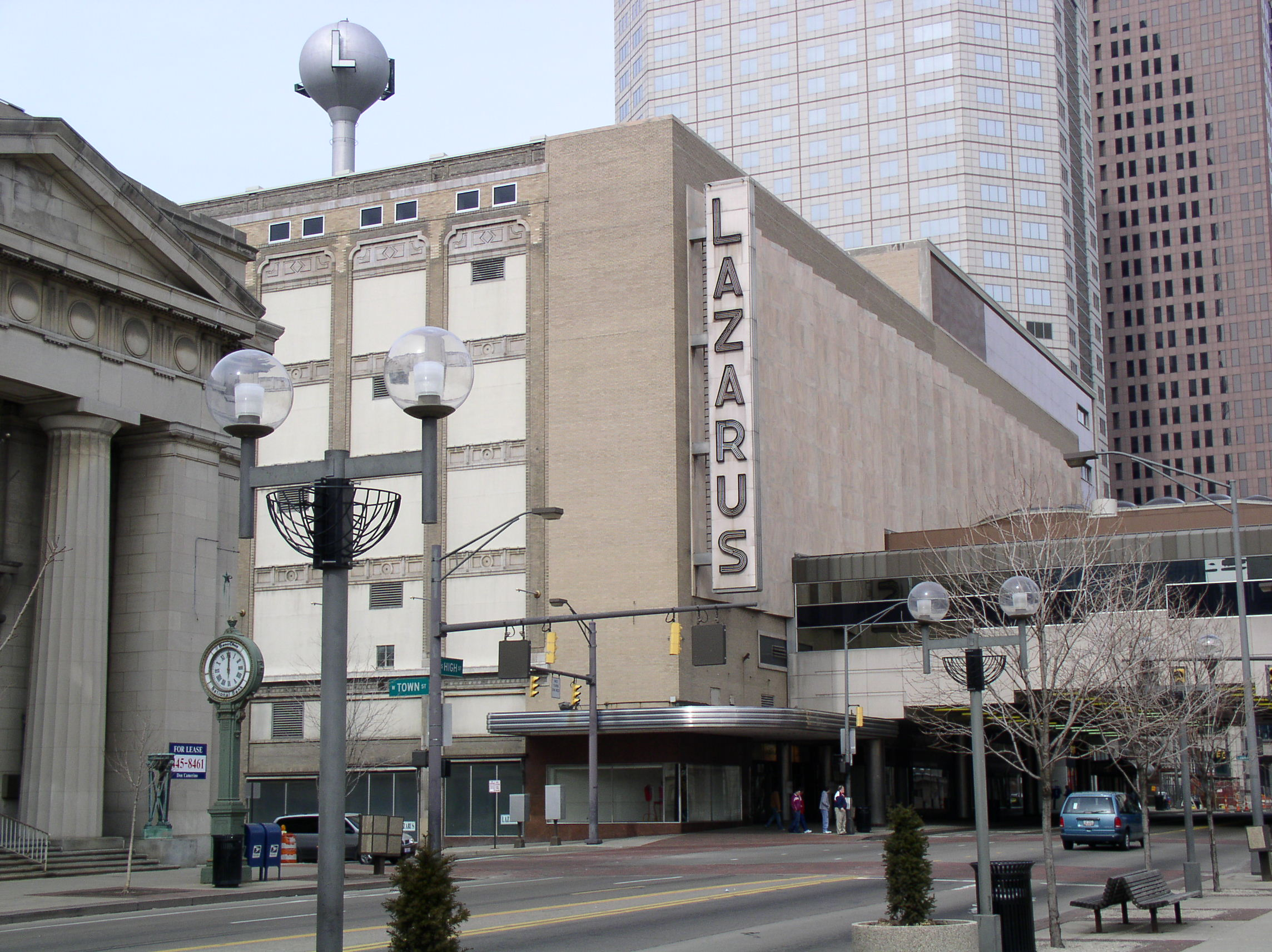
The building in 2007

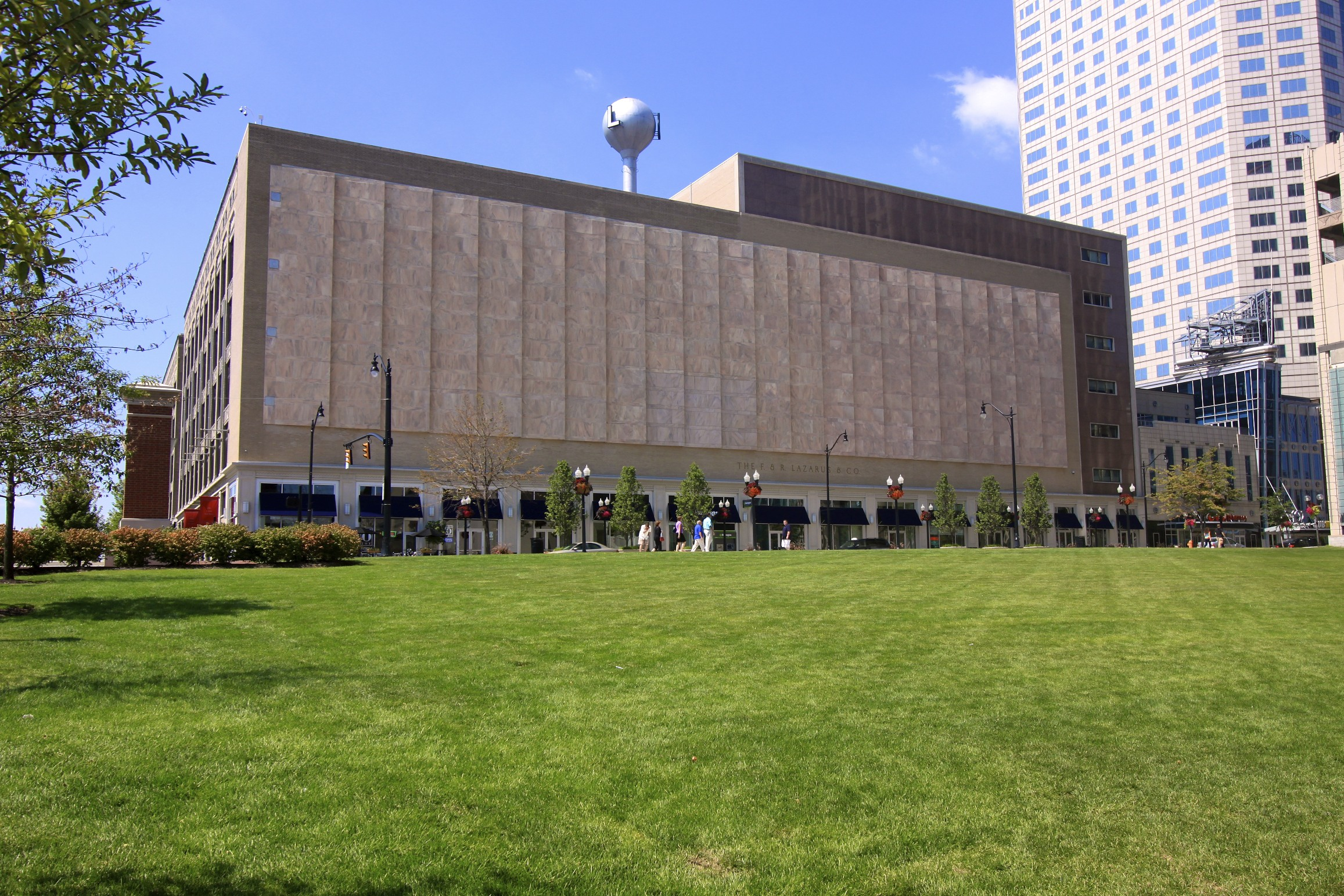
High Street facade, 2011

== See also ==
- 109-111 South High Street
- 171-191 South High Street
- Lazarus Annex
- Lazarus House
