= James Crabb =

Scottish classical accordion player

James Crabb (born 1967) is a Scottish classical accordion player.

Crabb was born in Dundee. He was given his first accordion at age 4 by his accordion-playing father. He studied at the Royal Danish Academy of Music in Copenhagen with classical accordion pioneer Mogens Ellegaard and was awarded the Carl Nielsen Music Prize, Denmark in 1991. In 2008 he was awarded the Fredriksborg Culture Centre's Artist Prize.

Since Crabb's London debut in 1992, critics internationally have praised him for his virtuosity and versatile musicianship. Since then he has performed worldwide as soloist with orchestras and ensembles including the BBC Symphony Orchestra, the BBC Scottish Symphony Orchestra, Royal Scottish National Orchestra, the Sydney Symphony Orchestra, the Melbourne Symphony Orchestra, the Philharmonia, the London Philharmonic Orchestra, the London Symphony Orchestra, The Hallé, the Rotterdam Philharmonic, the London Sinfonietta, Birmingham Contemporary Music Group, and the Paragon and Nash Ensembles.

His solo, chamber music and concerto repertoire ranges from original contemporary works, frequently commissioning new works and collaborating with composers, to transcriptions from Baroque through to the 21st Century, tango nuevo and folk music. He also performs and directs chamber orchestras from the instrument with amongst others, the Scottish Ensemble, Northern Sinfonia, English and Irish Chamber Orchestras, Kuhmo Virtuosi and Camerata Salzbug. James has also worked extensively with the Australian Chamber Orchestra.

Crabb's has performed the music of Astor Piazzolla in concerts with the original members of Piazzolla's own quintet along with tworecordings, one as soloist and arranger with the Australian Chamber Orchestra and the second with Richard Tognetti and the quintet named Tango Jam. In 2005 he directed from the accordion Piazzolla's Maria de Buenos Aires at the Royal Danish Opera. A selection of Crabb's acclaimed solo arrangements of Piazzolla's music was published in 2009 by Boosey & Hawkes.

James Crabb has recorded with his accordion duo colleague Geir Draugsvoll for EMI Classics transcriptions of Igor Stravinsky's Petrushka and Modest Mussorgsky's Pictures at an Exhibition. This duo performs regularly worldwide and collaborates frequently with the Tero Saarinen Dance Company from Finland.

He has been professor of classical accordion at the Royal Danish Academy of Music in Copenhagen since 1995 and has held a long-standing guest professorship at the University of Music and Dramatic Arts in Graz, Austria. He regularly gives master-classes at music institutions worldwide.

== Awards and nominations ==
=== ARIA Music Awards ===
The ARIA Music Awards is an annual awards ceremony held by the Australian Recording Industry Association. They commenced in 1987.

Year	Nominee / work	Award	Result	Ref.
2015	Heard This and Thought of You (with Genevieve Lacey)	Best World Music Album	Nominated	
