= Linda Kent =

- Genres: Classical
- Instruments: Harpsichord; Chamber organ

Linda Kent is an American-born harpsichord & chamber organ player. Together with Genevieve Lacey Kent was nominated for the 2002 ARIA Award for Best Classical Album for the album Piracy. Piracy, sub titled Baroque music stolen for the recorder, was recorded in March 2000 and released through ABC Classics in 2002.

== Discography ==
List of studio albums, with selected details
Title	Album details
Piracy (with Genevieve Lacey)	Released: 2002; Label: ABC Classics

== Awards and nominations ==
=== ARIA Music Awards ===
The ARIA Music Awards is an annual awards ceremony that recognises excellence, innovation, and achievement across all genres of Australian music. They commenced in 1987.

Year	Nominee / work	Award	Result	Ref.
2002	Piracy (with Genevieve Lacey)	Best Classical Album	Nominated	
