= Philharmonic Piano Quartet =

American piano quartet

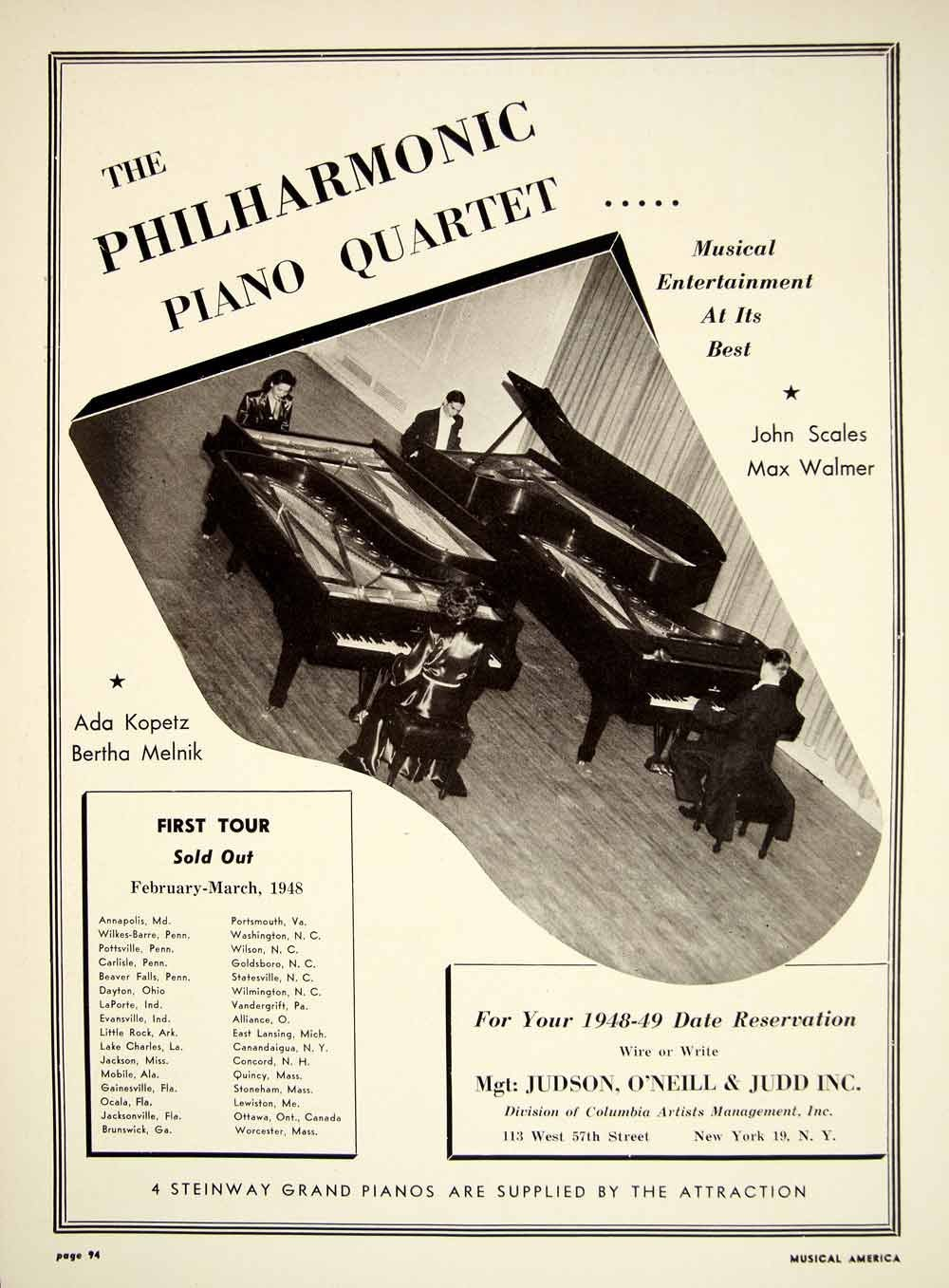
Advertisement for the Philharmonic Piano Quartet's inaugural concert tour

The Philharmonic Piano Quartet was a New York-based ensemble of four pianists active from 1948 until the mid-1950s. Despite their name, the ensemble had no connection with the New York Philharmonic Orchestra. They toured throughout the United States and made two recordings for the Columbia Masterworks label.

== History ==
The quartet was formed in 1948 when they made the first of their several tours of the United States under the sponsorship of Columbia Artists Management. They made their official New York City debut in a concert at Lewisohn Stadium on June 25, 1949. The ensemble also appeared in syndicated radio broadcasts of ABC's Piano Playhouse and made two LP recordings for the Columbia Masterworks label in 1949 and 1950.

All four of the original members, Ada Kopetz, Bertha Melnik, Max Walmer, and John Scales, were trained at the Juilliard School, two of them under Alexander Siloti. By the mid-1950s the original quartet had been replaced by Gisela Richter, Moreland Kortkamp, Emmett Vokes and Herbert Rogers, all of whom were likewise graduates of Juilliard.

Although classical music predominated in their repertoire, they also included pieces from musical theatre and folk music in their performances and recordings. Their music was arranged for four pianos by the German-born composer and conductor Moritz von Bomhard.

== Members ==
=== Founding members ===
- Ada Kopetz (also known after her marriage as Ada Kopetz-Korf) (1919–2020) was born in New York City. She studied with James Friskin at Juilliard and later with Eduard Steuermann in California. During World War II she gave many hospital concerts sponsored by the USO and after the war appeared as a soloist with the New York City Symphony. In later years she often performed as an accompanist and taught piano at both the Manhattan School of Music and Columbia University.
- Bertha Melnik (1914–2013) was born in Hartford, Connecticut and attended the Juilliard Graduate School from 1934 to 1939, where she studied piano with Alexander Siloti. She later studied with Robert Casadesus at the American Conservatory in Fontainebleau. In 1968 she was the pianist and assistant conductor for the original New York production of Jacques Brel Is Alive and Well and Living in Paris. In her later years Melnik worked primarily as an accompanist and vocal coach and taught at both Juilliard and the Manhattan School of Music. She died in 2013 at the age of 99.
- Max Walmer (1916–1986) was born in Lucas, Kansas and graduated in music from Bethany College. In 1938 he was awarded a graduate fellowship in piano at Juilliard where he studied under Alexander Siloti and Rosina Lhévinne. Prior to joining the quartet, he had an active career as an accompanist in vocal recitals and also toured the United States as the pianist for the Nine O'Clock Opera Company. He continued to work as an accompanist and vocal coach after leaving the quartet. Among the singers he worked with was Giorgio Tozzi whom he prepared for his role debut as Hans Sachs in Die Meistersinger von Nürnberg. Walmer was also the choral director for the 1963 Broadway premiere of Luther and composed a De Profundis for the production.
- John Grover Scales (1923–1953), the youngest member of the quartet, was born in Grove, Oklahoma, the son of a Baptist minister. After graduating in music from Oklahoma Baptist University, he studied at Juilliard and Columbia University where he received his master's degree shortly before joining the quartet. Scales died in 1953. The John Grover Scales Memorial Scholarship at Oklahoma Baptist University was established in his honor.

=== Later members ===
- Gisela Richter (born 1929) was born in Berlin and began her music studies in Basel, Switzerland. She studied for her undergraduate degree at De Paul University and then received a scholarship to Juilliard, where she studied piano under Sascha Gorodnitzki. She received her post-graduate degree from Juilliard in 1952 and in September of that year married fellow quartet member Emmett Vokes. At the time of their marriage, her father, Werner Richter, was the Rector of the University of Bonn. In the 2020s, Gisela Richter Reffel was living in Germany.
- Moreland Kortkamp (1916–2006) was born in Alton, Illinois, and grew up in California, where she began her musical studies. She won a six-year scholarship to Juilliard, where she studied under Josef and Rosina Lhévinne. After graduating in 1944 she toured Italy and North Africa as a member of the first USO concert group to be sent overseas. She later married the conductor A. Clyde Roller and taught piano at the University of Houston.
- Emmett Vokes (1928–2019), born Robert Emmett Vokes in Plainfield, New Jersey, studied as a child under Anton Rovinsky. By the time he was 18, he had appeared as a soloist in many local concerts. At Juilliard he studied under Beveridge Webster and Sascha Gorodnitzki. Vokes graduated from Juilliard in 1952, winning the Frank Damrosch Award for distinguished scholastic and music achievement. Vokes made his New York City solo debut in recital at Carnegie Hall on 11 January 1958 and gave a second recital at The Town Hall in 1961. In the course of his career he was a faculty member of Peabody College in Nashville, the University of Texas at Austin, and St. Mary's University in San Antonio. Vokes first married his quartet colleague Gisela Richter; he later married pianist Carol Cooper, with whom he had eight children.
- Herbert Rogers (1929–1983) was born in Wichita Falls, Texas. Shortly before arriving at Juilliard he appeared as a soloist with the Houston and Dallas Symphonies. A student of Olga Samaroff, Rosalyn Tureck and Sascha Gorodnitzki, he completed his post-graduate studies at Juilliard in 1956. In the 1960s and 70s he made solo recordings for the Whitehall, CRI and Dorian labels. Rogers taught at the University of California, Santa Cruz and then at Hunter College in New York from 1968 until his death in 1983.

== Recordings ==
- Music for Four Pianos (Lecuona: Andalucia; Traditional: Cradle Song; Prokofiev: Procession from Peter and the Wolf; Strauss: Waltzes from Die Fledermaus; Morganstern: Toccata Guatemala). Philharmonic Piano Quartet; arrangements by Moritz von Bomhard. LP, 1949. Label: Columbia Masterworks
- Popular Classics for Four Pianos (Waldteufel: Estudiantina; Liszt: Consolation no. 3 in D-flat major; Tchaikovsky: Dance of the Sugar-Plum Fairy, Dance of the Reed Pipes, Waltz of the Flowers; Strauss: Perpetuum Mobile; Offenbach: Offenbachiana). Philharmonic Piano Quartet; arrangements by Moritz von Bomhard. LP, 1950. Label: Columbia Masterworks
