= 109–111 South High Street =

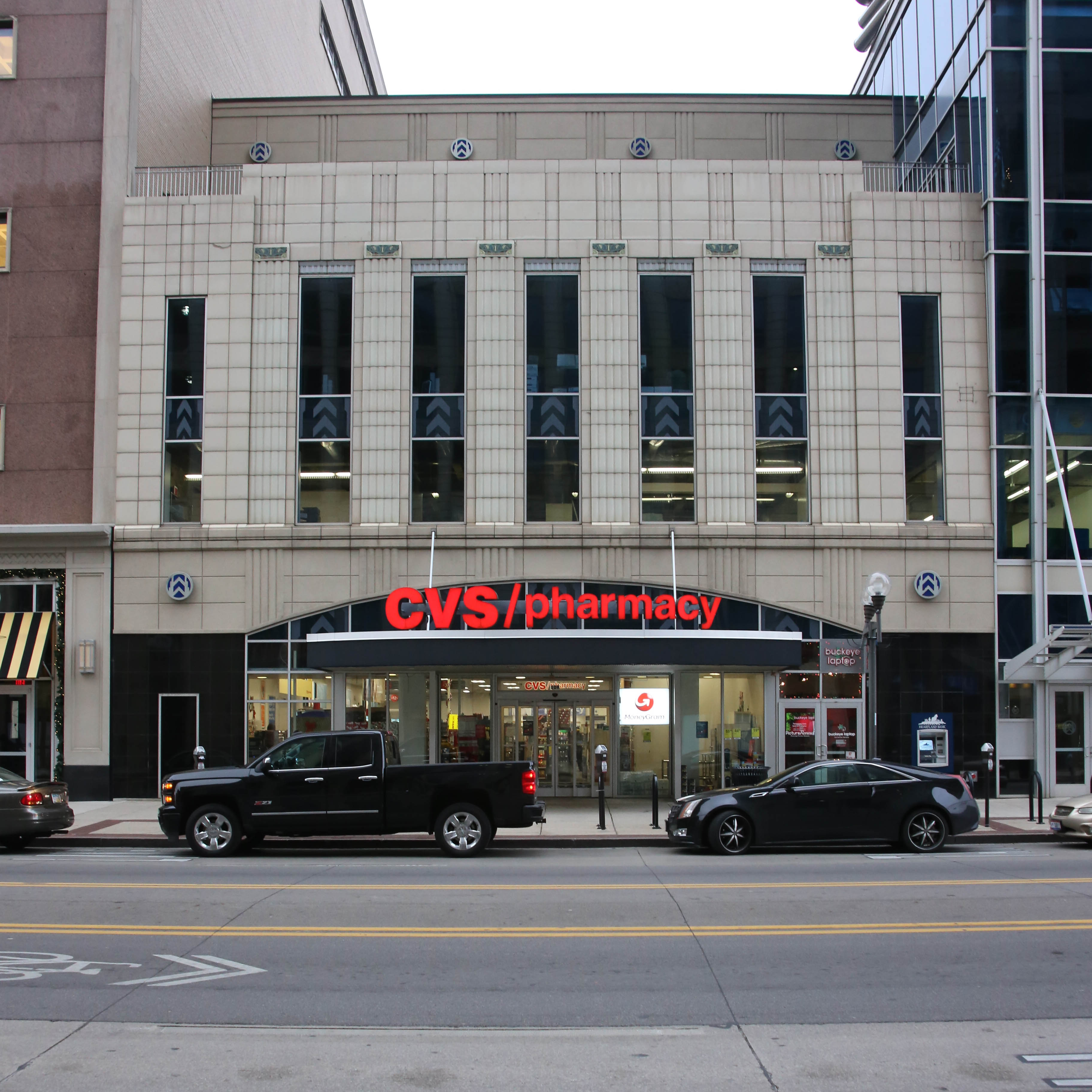
- 109–111 South High in 2016
- Interactive map of the 109–111 South High Street area

General information
- Location: 109–111 S. High Street, Columbus, Ohio
- Coordinates: 39.9597°N 83.0006°W
- Opened: 1938
- Affiliation: F. W. Woolworth Company; CVS Pharmacy

109–111 South High Street is a commercial building on South High Street in Downtown Columbus, Ohio. The building was built in a commercial district that has housed numerous businesses. The current building was constructed c. 1938 for a Woolworth's five-and-dime store, which operated until 1997. After six years of vacancy, the building housed a CVS pharmacy, from 2003 to 2022.

== Attributes ==
As originally planned, the building was to be a modern, air-conditioned building measuring 62.5 feet wide and 187.5 feet deep. It would have three stories, in addition to a basement and sub-basement, with the upper basement and two floors above set to be retail space. Its exterior was to be of brick, steel, and terracotta with a slab roof and terracotta front. The interior would have a bakery, cafeteria, shelf space, stoker boilers, two freight elevators, and three dumbwaiters.

== History ==
The Johnson Building and surrounding structures, c. 1909-1910

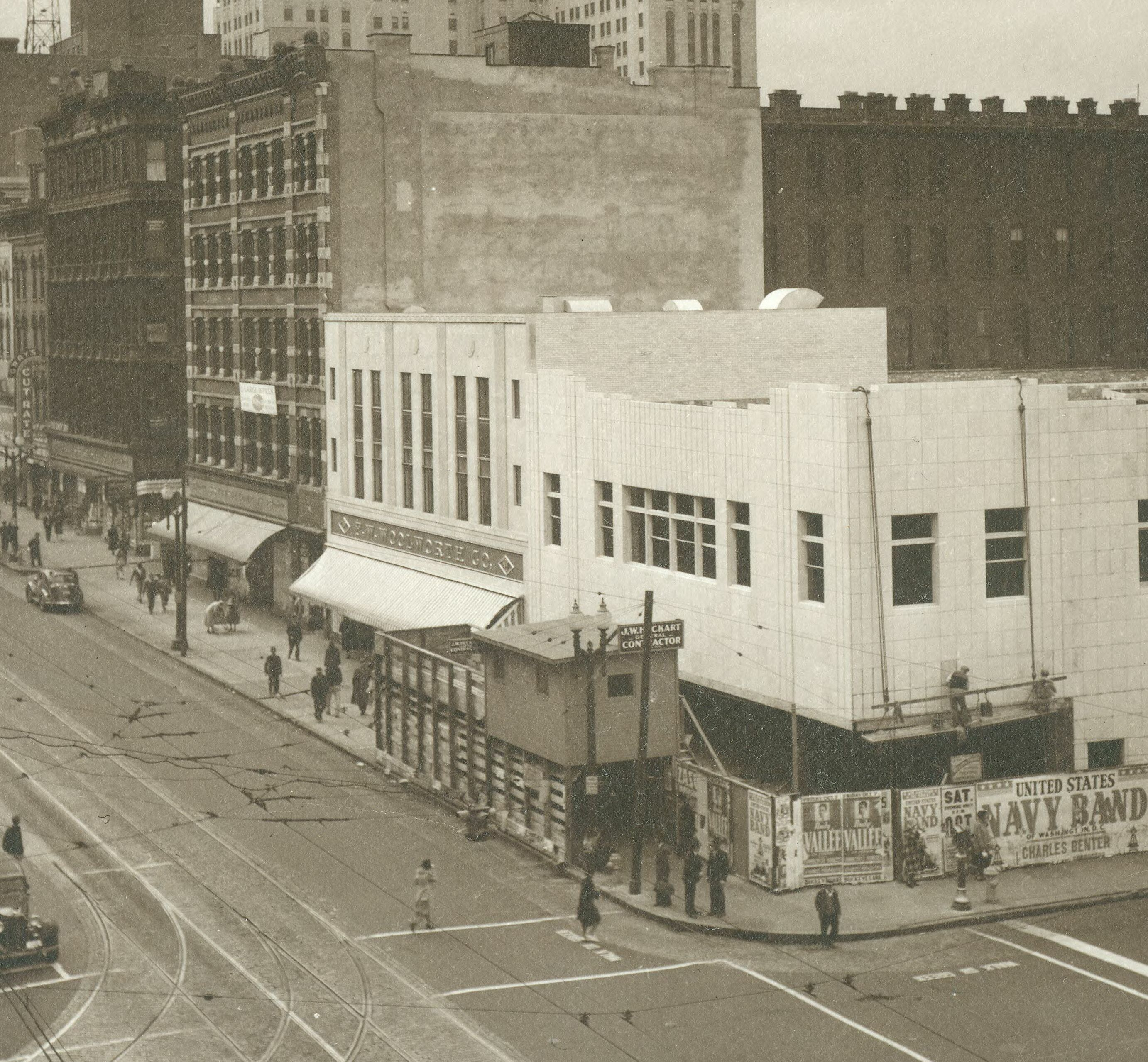
The 105 N. High Street store c. 1930s

In fall 1812, as the city was being organized, John Collett built a two-story brick tavern at this site. Sale of lots began on June 18, 1812. The structure was the first two-story building in Columbus. In 1813, the tavern opened, managed by Volney Payne. Collett managed it at times in 1814 and until around 1818, when he sold the business to Robert Russell. Russell opened Russell's Tavern, also called the Globe. The business earned a reputation as one of the best taverns west of the Alleghenies. In 1827, a menagerie came into the town, headed by the elephant Tippo Sultan. The exhibition took place at the tavern over the course of three days, and were housed at the rear of the building. The event was recorded in local history books as the elephant broke loose and began drinking water out of the well and breaking into barrels of flour, awakening Russell.

Russell's Tavern operated until 1847, succeeded by the F. C. Sessions' dry goods store. As early as 1922, the F. W. Woolworth Company operated a five-and-dime store there. It was one of four Woolworth's in Columbus by 1934. In March 1937, the company sought bids to construct a new building for the store on the same site. By April, the construction arrangements were completed. The store was to be the largest Woolworth's in the area of Michigan, Indiana, Ohio, Kentucky, and West Virginia, and carrying a cost of $350,000. The new store would require razing of two old four story buildings: Woolworth's and the Wilbur Rogers dress shop. The store opened around 1938, just before a new Woolworth's opened at 105 North High Street, replacing one destroyed in a fire in the previous year. Both buildings were designed in a similar style.

The company remained there until it closed its last 400 stores in 1997. By the time of its closure, the store at 109-111 South High was the last of about a dozen Woolworth's stores in Columbus. The Woolworth store was considered a downtown landmark, recognized by The Columbus Dispatch. It closed one week before a $300 million shopping mall opened in a Columbus suburb: The Mall at Tuttle Crossing. Woolworth once had about a dozen stores in Central Ohio, and all stores were announced to close in 1997 (including all remaining stores in the U.S.). Columbus had held a Woolworth or precursor (F. M. Kirby & Co.) since 1882, operating at Long and High Streets. The store adjacent to Columbus City Center became the biggest Woolworth's in 1959. It had a major bus stop steps from its door, and a lunch counter with low prices, a counterpoint to mall prices and brands. At the time of its closure it had 30 full- or part-time employees, some with 30 years' service at the location. It has operated adjacent to the Lazarus store since the 1930s, but changing consumer habits were reported to be the cause for the business closing.

In the 1990s, a developer associated with the Schottenstein family purchased the building along with a neighboring short building at 107 S. High, in a plan to prevent other developers from building a competing high-rise structure across the street from the 23-story Fifth Third Center, a project of that developer. By the end of the decade, vacancy rates in Downtown Columbus were low, persuading the developer to build a 22-story office building on the site. As the market turned, vacancies increased, leading the company to shelve the plans.

The building was vacant for approximately six years. In 2003, a developer announced plans for a CVS Pharmacy to occupy the former Woolworth store. The pharmacy would anchor a 43,000-square-foot (4,000 m^{2}) retail and office complex. The developer would demolish a neighboring brick building and connect it into the 109-111 South High building. The developer also planned for a lower-level parking garage and rooftop video screens. The project would take design inspirations from the Woolworth building, and match the architecture of the Fifth Third Center, a project by the same developer. The buildings now share elevators, restrooms, and other amenities, which increases leasable space and lowers costs. The same was planned for 101 S. High.

In March 2022, CVS announced it would close the downtown store on April 1, as part of its move to close 900 stores (10 percent of its locations), determined by factors including "changes in population, consumer buying patterns and future health needs" as well as "the needs of underserved communities". The store was one of few convenience or pharmacy stores around Capitol Square, and left no CVS stores remaining in Downtown Columbus.

== See also ==
- List of Woolworth buildings
