= Jennifer Condon =

Australian conductor

- Born: 1983 (age 42–43); Wollongong, Australia
- Occupation: Conductor
- Website: jennifercondon.com

Jennifer Condon (born 1983 in Wollongong) is an Australian conductor.

== Biography ==
In 1989, Condon's mother took her to see the opera The Gondoliers, after which she decided she wanted to be a mezzo-soprano. In 1995, at 11 and influenced by Simone Young, she decided to become a conductor. She got in touch with Young and spent her following teen years in the rehearsal room at Opera Australia. She also took music and piano lessons at the Wollongong Conservatorium of Music.

At the age of 16, after having discovered Peggy Glanville-Hicks' Sappho opera in the archives of the Opera Australia, Condon asked the opera director Lindy Hume if she could lead and record it.

She attended the Kambala School in Sydney on a music scholarship for her high school years. Condon studied operatic conducting with Vladimir Vais during her undergraduate years. She studied music at the Conservatory of Sydney and earned her A.Uus.A and L.Mus.A in piano and a Bachelor of Music Studies. At the same time, she was working as an accompanist for the Melbourne City Opera and conducted The Tales of Hoffmann at the Sydney University Arts Festival.

Jennifer Condon moved to Europe in 2005, starting her work as a souffleuse at the Hamburg State Opera where she has worked on more than 40 operas.

In 2009, she was authorized to conduct Peggy Glanville-Hicks' Sappho. While traveling in Bali, she met James Murdoch, the biographer of Peggy Glanville-Hicks. In July 2012, she made her debuts as an opera conductor at the Lisbon Gulbenkian Orchestra.

In 2015, she was selected with 5 other conductors to participate in the inaugural year of the Dallas Opera's Institute for Women Conductors.

In 2018, the Peggy Glanville-Hicks' estate granted her the right to the world premiere recording and production of Sappho, the composer's final opera.

== Family ==
Jennifer Condon is the great niece of the music lecturer Denis Condon.
