= The Transposed Heads =

1940 novella by Thomas Mann

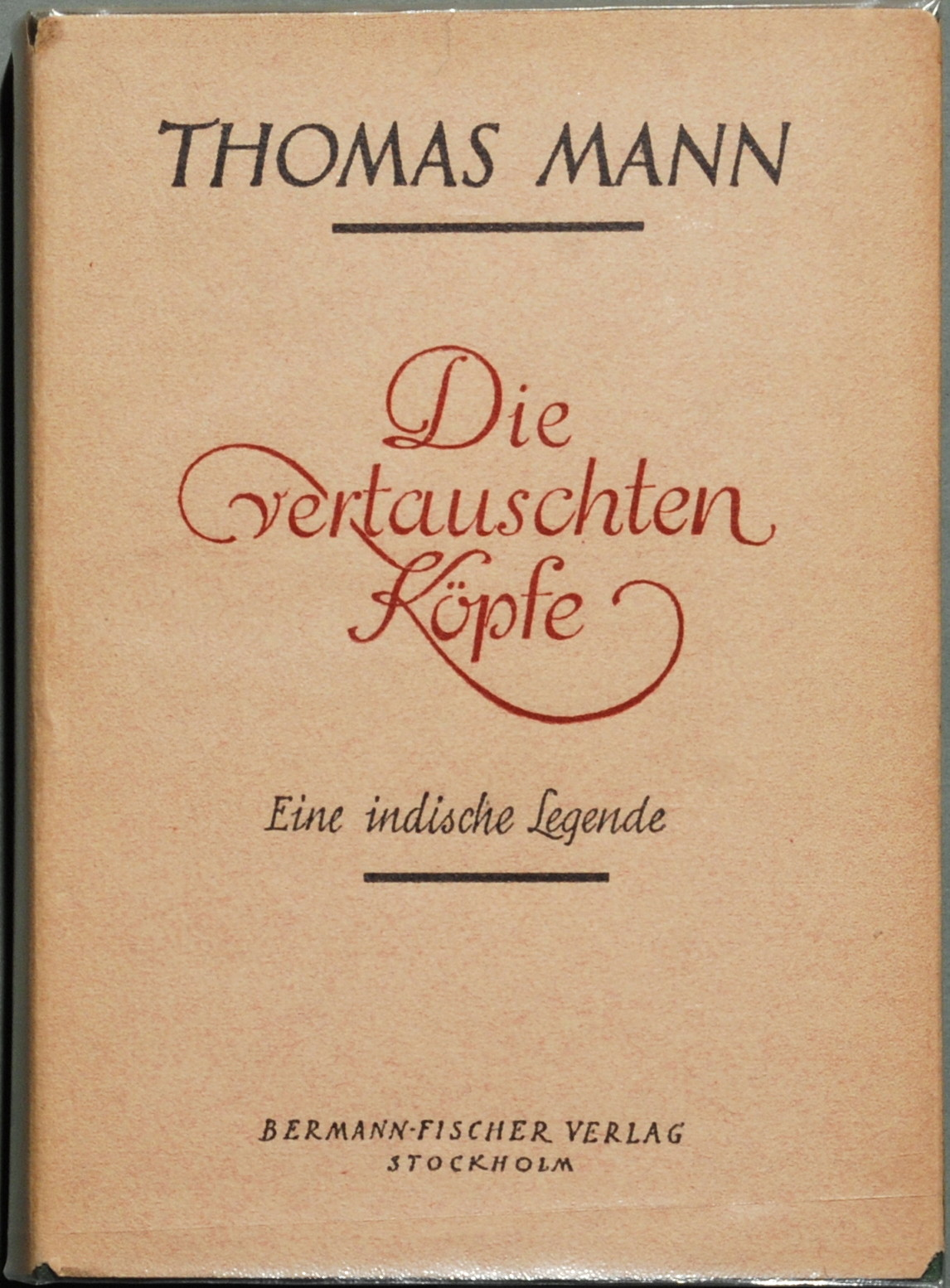
- Cover of the first edition
- Author: Thomas Mann
- Original title: Die vertauschten Köpfe
- Language: German
- Genre: novella
- Publisher: Bermann-Fischer
- Publication date: 1940
- English publication date: 1941 by Alfred A. Knopf

The Transposed Heads (German: Die vertauschten Köpfe) is a novella by Thomas Mann. It was written in 1940 and published later that year by Bermann-Fischer. The English translation by H. T. Lowe-Porter was published in 1941 by Alfred A. Knopf. It was one of Mann's last novellas, followed only by The Tables of the Law in 1944 and The Black Swan in 1954. Set in India, the story is a jocular retelling of an ancient folk legend.

== Background and themes ==
Mann subtitled the novella An Indian Legend. He was inspired to write it after reading a book on the Indian goddess Kali by the Indologist Heinrich Zimmer in which Zimmer recounted the old folk tale which became the basis of The Transposed Heads. (Note: The original story is contained in the Kathasaritsagara) Mann began writing it in January 1940 and finished in August of that year. He dedicated the published work to Zimmer adding the words "Returned with thanks". Both its setting and its source marked a unique departure from Mann's oeuvre. He described it as his "first approach to the French surrealist sphere", an oblique reference to the work of Jean Cocteau whom Mann knew through Cocteau's friendship with his son Klaus. Although the tale is a tragic one, Mann recounts it in a tongue-in-cheek style.

According to Jens Rieckmann, (Note: Jens Rieckmann (1944–2014) was a scholar of German Modernism. At the time of his death he was Professor Emeritus of German at the University of California, Irvine.) despite its exotic setting, the themes of The Transposed Heads—"sensuality, metaphysics, entangled identities, and the problem of love and individuality"—were central to Mann's work. Another theme in the story is the femme fatale archetype that can also be seen in several of Mann's works, including Little Herr Friedemann and Castorp's nightmarish visions of female cannibals in The Magic Mountain. Sita, the central female character of The Transposed Heads, is a seemingly innocent girl who causes the death of both the men who love her. She becomes a human manifestation of Kali, the goddess of time and creation but also of destruction.

== Plot ==
Shridaman and Nanda are two young friends who are "little different in age and in caste, but very unlike in body." Shridaman is a learned merchant with strong spiritual qualities and a noble face but a thin, weedy body. Nanda is a blacksmith with a strong and beautiful body but a rather ordinary intellect. Both fall in love with Sita, the daughter of a cattle-breeder. (Note: In the opening sentence Mann refers to her as "Sita of the beautiful hips".) She accepts Shridaman's proposal of marriage but shortly after their wedding, she begins to wonder if she had made the wrong choice. Matters are not helped by the fact that Nanda has remained Shridaman's friend and is a frequent visitor to their house. Soon, both Nanda and Shridaman become aware of what is happening.

Six months after the wedding and with Sita pregnant with Shridaman's child, they set off to visit her parents accompanied by Nanda. On the way they stop at a temple to the goddess Kali where Shridaman goes in to pray. In a fit of religious fervor he beheads himself to free Sita to marry Nanda. Nanda then enters the temple and when he finds Shridaman's corpse, he likewise beheads himself. On discovering what has happened, Sita is about to hang herself when goddess Kali appears. She tells Sita to place the heads back on the bodies and she will bring them back to life. However, in her grief and confusion Sita had placed Nanda's head on Shridaman's body and vice versa. Each man now retains his original identity but has a new body.

At first the situation seems to be going well. Sita gives birth to Samadhi, a lovable child with very poor eyesight who is nicknamed "Andhaka" ("Little blind boy"). Shridaman is pleased to have a perfect body and Nanda is pleased to have the body that has fathered Sita's child. He is also pleased that Sita is having sex with his former body. Nevertheless, they decide to consult the wise man Kamadamana as to which of the two men is actually her husband. He determines that it is the one with the head of Shridaman. In his disappointment, Nanda becomes a religious recluse.

Four years have passed. While Shridaman is away on business, Sita takes her son to visit Nanda and show him the child his new body had generated. Sita and Nanda are overwhelmed by passion. On returning to an empty house, Shridaman sets off to find Nanda and Sita. He proposes to them the only solution for a situation where a woman is simultaneously in love with one man's body and another man's head. The two men are to commit suicide, and Sita is to die a ritual death on her husband's funeral pyre. This duly happens with little Samadhi-Andhaka lighting the flames.

== Adaptations ==
- The Transposed Heads, an opera by Peggy Glanville-Hicks (1954)
- Les têtes interverties, a short mime film loose adaptation directed by Saul Gilbert, Alejandro Jodorowsky, and Ruth Michelly (1957)
- The Transposed Heads, a musical play adapted from Mann's story by Julie Taymor and Sidney Goldfarb with music by Elliot Goldenthal (1984, revised 1986)
- Hayavadana, a play by Girish Karnad which combines the plot of The Transposed Heads with further inventions by Karnad (1975)
