= Genevieve Lacey =

Australian recorder player

- Born: Papua New Guinea
- Genre: Recorder
- Occupation: musician
- Years active: 1995–present
- Website: https://genevievelacey.com/

Genevieve Lacey is an Australian musician and recorder virtuoso, working as a performer, creator, curator, and cultural leader. She plays handmade recorders made by Joanne Saunders and Fred Morgan. In her collection, she also has instruments by David Coomber, Monika Musch, Michael Grinter, Paul Whinray, and Herbert Paetzold.

== Early life and education ==
Genevieve Lacey was born in the Highlands of Papua New Guinea, the third of four children of Ann and Roderic Lacey. The family moved to Australia in 1980. They lived in Canberra for one year, where all the Lacey children learnt music from Judith Clingan.

In 1981 the family moved to Ballarat, Victoria, where Lacey completed school, and studied recorder with Helen Fairhall and oboe with Joanne Saunders.

She moved to Melbourne to attend the University of Melbourne from 1991 to 1994, studying English Literature and Music (recorder with Ruth Wilkinson, oboe with Stephen Robinson). She then moved to Basel, Switzerland, where she undertook postgraduate studies in medieval and renaissance music at the Schola Cantorum Basiliensis (1995–96). Relocating to Denmark to attend the Carl Nielsen Academy of Music, Odense (1996–98), she received a Diploma in recorder performance in the class of Dan Laurin. She returned to Australia in 1998, and completed a doctorate at the University of Melbourne (1999-2001). She has since been based in Melbourne.

== Career as a recorder virtuoso ==
As a recorder virtuoso, Lacey has performed at the Lindau International Convention of Nobel Laureates, for Queen Elizabeth II in Westminster Abbey, on a basketball court on Thursday Island with Australian indigenous ensemble The Black Arm Band, as a concerto soloist in the Royal Albert Hall for BBC Proms and at the opening night of the London Jazz Festival. She has appeared as a soloist with orchestras including Australian Chamber Orchestra, City of London Sinfonia, Kymi and Tapiola Sinfonietta Finland, Concerto Copenhagen, English Concert, Academy of Ancient Music, St Petersburg Chamber Orchestra, Korean Symphony Orchestra, Malaysian Philharmonic Orchestra, Australian Brandenburg Orchestra, Melbourne Chamber Orchestra, and the Melbourne, Adelaide, West Australian, Tasmanian and Queensland Symphony Orchestras. Lacey has performed chamber music with artists such as James Crabb, Marshall McGuire, Jane Gower and Lars Ulrik Mortensen, Paolo Pandolfo, Poul Høxbro, Paul Grabowsky, Neal Peres Da Costa and Daniel Yeadon, Karin Schaupp, Flinders Quartet and Elision Ensemble, and has appeared at festivals including Sound Unbound (Barbican), Paris Festival d'Automne, Klangboden Wien, Seoul International Music Festival, and at Cheltenham, Huddersfield, Copenhagen Summer, Montalbane, the MaerzMusik festival (Berlin) and all the major Australian arts festivals.

Lacey has also made an extensive contribution to contemporary recorder repertoire, commissioning and premiering works by composers as wide-ranging as Australians Liza Lim, Elena Kats-Chernin, Brett Dean, Lou Bennett, Andrea Keller, Hollis Taylor, Paul Grabowsky, Ben Frost, as well as Erkki-Sven Tuur (Estonia), John Surman (UK), Max de Wardener (UK), Jason Yarde (UK), Jan Bang (Norway), Christian Fennesz (Germany) and Nico Muhly (USA).

== Creations: solo and collaborative projects ==
Lacey's creations combine her skills as a performer, composer, and curator. Her works are experienced in a wide variety of contexts and often connect people and ideas. Recent collaborators include composer Erkki Veltheim, writer Alexis Wright, musician and language activist Lou Bennett, choreographers Gideon Obarzanek and Stephanie Lake, and actor Katherine Tonkin. Lacey’s recent works include Breathing Space (2023), a major permanent sound installation for the National Museum of Australia, and Consort of the Moon (2023), a performance piece created with Erkki Veltheim for Rising and Brisbane Festivals. Other collaborations include multidisciplinary works Soliloquy (2018) and one infinity (2018) that both explore the powerful combination of music and movement. In Soliloquy, 40 untrained participants share the stage with a virtuoso musician and a professional dancer to radically re-invent the conventions of a solo recital. one infinity is a cross-cultural collaboration between musicians, dancers and choreographers from China, Australia and the United Kingdom that takes inspiration from the ancient Chinese tale of Zhi Yin. Lacey's creations also include Pleasure Garden (2016), a kinetic sound installation designed for visitors to experience while wandering through an outdoor or indoor garden, or verdant places. This collaboration is a fusion of music, field recordings and technology (including motion-tracking cameras), and combines 17th century melodies of Jacob van Eyck with contemporary electro-acoustic sound art. Her film collaborations include animated documentary film Recorder Queen (2020), directed by Sophie Raymond, an autobiographical journey of Lacey's creative life that explores the feelings of being a musician.

=== Works ===
- 2023: Consort of the Moon, performance piece for Rising and Brisbane Festival, Major Festivals Initiative
- 2023: Breathing Space, permanent sound installation, National Museum of Australia
- 2018: Soliloquy, participatory music-dance ritual
- 2018: one infinity, cross-cultural music-dance performance
- 2016: Pleasure Garden, a kinetic sound installation experienced by 30,000+ people in Australia and Europe
- 2015: Acoustic Life of Sheds, a suite of new music, performed in sheds for Big hART
- 2015: Life in Music, radio series for ABC Radio
- 2014–2020: Recorder Queen, animated documentary film
- 2013: Conversations with Ghosts live concert and recording project with Australian singer-songwriter Paul Kelly
- 2010: Namatjira, theatre work and documentary film for Big hART
- 2010: En Masse, live music-film installation

== Artistic director–curator ==
Lacey is artistic director for Finding Our Voice, was a member of the curatorial team for Rising 2019–20, is the artistic advisor to UKARIA, and was the chamber music curator of A Brief History of Time for the 2019 Adelaide International Arts Festival. In 2018, she was the artist in residence for the Melbourne Recital Centre, and the curator and artistic director for the Whoever You Are Come Forth celebrations for the centenary of St Mary's College, University of Melbourne. Other curatorial roles include the inaugural curator for UKARIA 24 in 2016, creator, curator and presenter for Words and Music at Wheeler Centre in 2014, and curating the live music program for the Art Music Awards, APRA-Australian Music Centre, 2013–2015. She was the artistic director for Musica Viva Australia's FutureMakers from 2015 to 2019, Four Winds Festival from 2008 until 2012, and the Melbourne Autumn Music Festival between 1999 and 2003. She has provided support and guidance to emerging artists as a creative and entrepreneurial mentor, with positions including mentoring for the Freedman Fellowship Finalists 2019-2020 and the Australian National Academy of Music's Fellowship program between 2014 and 2016.

== Discography ==
=== Albums ===
List of studio albums, with selected details
Title	Album details
Phoenix Songs	Released: 1995; Label: Move (MD 3165)
Two	Released: 1999; Label: Move (MD 3216)
Il Flauto Dolce (with Australian Brandenburg Orchestra and Paul Dyer)	Released: 2001; Label: ABC Classics (ABC 4618282)
Piracy: Baroque music stolen for the recorder (with Linda Kent)	Released: 2002; Label: ABC Classics (ABC 4722262)
Once Upon a Time (with Poul Høxbro)	Released: 2004; Label: ABC Classics (ABC 4761552)
Songs without Words (with Karin Schaupp)	Released: 2006; Label: ABC Classics (ABC 4765249)
Weaver of Fictions	Released: 2008; Label: ABC Classics (ABC 4763180)
Re-Inventions (with Flinders Quartet)	Released: 2009; Label: Flinders Quartet
Three Lanes (with Andrea Keller and Joe Talia)	Released: May 2012; Label: Andrea Keller (AK001)
Trios by Handle, Vivaldi and Telemann (with Neal Peres Da Costa and Daniel Yeadon)	Released: October 2012; Label: ABC Music
Conversations with Ghosts (with Paul Kelly, James Ledger & ANAM Musicians)	Released: 2013; Label: ABC Music (3747193)
Heard This and Thought of You (with James Crabb)	Released: 7 August 2015; Label: ABC Music (4811874)
Pleasure Garden	Released: 8 January 2016; Label: ABC Music (4812370)
Telemann: Sonatas, Sonatinas and Fantasias with Lars Ulrik Mortensen and Jane Gower)	Released: October 2016; Label: ABC Music
Line Drawings: Music of Jacob van Eyck	Released: November 2017; Label: ABC Music (4816480)
Tüür: Illuminatio Whistles and Whispers From Uluru Symphony (with Lawrence Power, Olari Elts & Tapiola Sinfonietta)	Released: February 2018; Label: Ondine (ODE 1303-2)
Soliloquy: Telemann Solo Fantasia	Released: October 2018; Label: ABC Music (4816480)
Breathing Space	Released: 24 March 2023; Label: ABC Music (ABCL0057)

== Filmography ==
Year	Title	Director	Ref.
2020	Recorder Queen	Sophie Raymond	
2017	Namatjira Project	Sera Davies	

== Publications ==
- McKinnon, C. (2020). Adelaide Festival 60 Years. Amsterdam University Press.
- Lacey, Genevieve (2021). 'Life in Music', in Creative Research in Music: Informed Practice, Innovation and Transcendence (1st ed.). Routledge.

== Awards and nominations ==
=== AIR Awards ===
The Australian Independent Record Awards (commonly known informally as AIR Awards) is an annual awards night to recognise, promote and celebrate the success of Australia's Independent Music sector.

Year	Nominee / work	Award	Result	Ref.
2022	Bower (with Marshall McGuire)	Best Independent Classical Album or EP	Won	

=== ARIA Music Awards ===
The ARIA Music Awards is an annual awards ceremony that recognises excellence, innovation, and achievement across all genres of Australian music.

Year	Nominee / work	Award	Result	Ref.
2001	Il Flauto Dolce (with Australian Brandenburg Orchestra and Paul Dyer)	Best Classical Album	Won	
2002	Piracy: Baroque music stolen for the recorder (with Linda Kent)	Best Classical Album	Nominated	
2013	Conversations with Ghosts (with Paul Kelly, James Ledger & ANAM Musicians)	Best Original Soundtrack/Cast/ Show Album	Won	
2015	Heard This and Thought of You (with James Crabb)	Best World Music Album	Nominated	
2019	Soliloquy: Telemann Solo Fantasia	Best Classical Album	Nominated	
2021	Bower (with Marshall McGuire)	Best Classical Album	Won	
2023	Breathing Space	Best Classical Album	Nominated	

=== Australian Women in Music Awards ===
The Australian Women in Music Awards is an annual event that celebrates outstanding women in the Australian Music Industry who have made significant and lasting contributions in their chosen field. They commenced in 2018.

Year	Nominee / work	Award	Result
2021	Genevieve Lacey	Excellence in Classical Music Award	Won

=== National Live Music Awards ===
The National Live Music Awards (NLMAs) are a broad recognition of Australia's diverse live industry, celebrating the success of the Australian live scene. The awards commenced in 2016.

Year	Nominee / work	Award	Result
2019	Genevieve Lacey	Live Classical Act of the Year	Nominated

=== Sidney Myer Performing Arts Awards ===
The Sidney Myer Performing Arts Awards commenced in 1984 and recognise outstanding achievements in dance, drama, comedy, music, opera, circus and puppetry.

Year	Nominee / work	Award	Result
2018	Genevieve Lacey	Individual Award	awarded

=== Other awards ===
- John Truscott Artists Award for Consort of the Moon, Rising, 2023
- Green Room for best composition and sound design for one infinity, with Max de Wardener, Wang Peng, Jim Atkins, 2019
- Estonian Music Best Classical Recording 2018 for Tüür Illuminatio
- Fellowship, Australia Council for the Arts, Music Board 2012–2013
- Excellence in a Regional Area, Art Music Awards APRA-AMC – Four Winds Festival 2011
- Helpmann Award, best touring production – Namatjira 2012
- State Award for Excellence, Art Music Awards APRA-AMC – En Masse 2011
- Outstanding Musician, Melbourne Prize for Music 2007
- Best performance, Art Music Awards APRA-AMC – Ledger's Line Drawing 2006
- Churchill Fellowship 2006
- Music Council of Australia/Freedman Fellowship for Australian performer of superb achievement 2001
- Helen M. Schutt Scholarship, most highly ranked female research student 1999
- Most outstanding graduate, Carl Nielsen Academy of Music, Denmark 1998
- First place, Dean's Honours List, Faculty of Music, University of Melbourne, 1994
- Welsford Smithers Travelling Scholarship, University of Melbourne 1994
- Queen's Trust Award for outstanding young Australians 1994
- Catherine Grace McWilliam Prize for most outstanding graduate, University of Melbourne 1994

=== Honorary positions ===
Chair, A New Approach Reference Group 2021—; Chair, Board of Directors, Australian Music Centre, 2016–2021; Director, A New Approach, 2021—; Advisory Council, A New Approach, 2018–; Director, Four Winds Festival Foundation Board, 2018–2020; Advisory Council, The New Approach (Myer, Fairfax, Keir Foundations), 2018; Board of Directors, The New Approach 2021 -; International Jury Member, Classical:NEXT, 2017; Advisory Panel, UKARIA, 2015–2017; Peer Assessment Panel, Australia Council for the Arts, 2015–2020; Board of Directors, Australian Music Centre, 2013–2015; Advisory Panel, Black Arm Band, 2011–2015; Judging Panel, City of Melbourne Arts Grants, 2011–2020; Advisory Committee, Australian Music Centre, 2010–2012; Judging Panel, Sidney Myer Performing Arts Award, 2008–2009; Board of Directors, Elision Ensemble, 2008–2015; Board of Directors, Astra Chamber Music Society, 2006–2012; Board of Directors, Australian Music Centre, 2006–2010; Judging Panel, Ian Potter Composer Fellowship Award, 2005–2007; Artistic Review Panel, Musica Viva Australia, 2004–2008; Honorary Fellow, University of Melbourne, 2002–2020.
