= Australian Music Centre =

Art music organisation in Australia

- Founded: 1968
- Founder: James Murdoch
- Type: Cultural institution
- Region served: Australia
- Key people: Marshall McGuire (chair)
- Website: www.australianmusiccentre.com.au

The Australian Music Centre (AMC), founded as Australia Music Centre in 1974 and known as Sounds Australian in the 1990s, is a national organisation promoting and supporting art music in Australia. It operates mainly as a service organisation, and co-hosts the Art Music Awards along with APRA AMCOS. It also publishes Resonate Magazine.

== History ==
After funds became available through the Australia Council for the Arts, the Australia Music Centre came into existence as an association on 13 August 1974. Music advocate James Murdoch was appointed inaugural director. In 1975 it moved to premises at 80 George Street, Sydney (part of the historic Metcalfe Bond Stores building), and was accepted as a member organisation of both the International Association of Music Information Centres (IAMIC) and International Association of Music Libraries (IAML).

On 27 February 1976, AMC was officially opened to the public, with the opening ceremony officiated by NSW Senator John Carrick. In September of that year, Peggy Glanville-Hicks was appointed consultant for Asian music.

The centre created a library and information service, at which Martin Buzzacott later worked for some years. It started publishing a newsletter, AMC News, and managed the Australia Council / APRA parts-copying scheme.

In 1981 the AMC had a period of dormancy, reopening to the public on 3 September 1982, after Joan Bona had been appointed administrator.

In 1986 the official name was changed from Australia Music Centre to Australian Music Centre, and it moved into new premises on Smail St, Ultimo, in June of that year. A recording project was announced, with recording studios based in Melbourne. Richard Letts was appointed executive director in 1987, a role he held until mid-1993. The record label, Vox Australis, and a magazine, Sounds Australian, were established during this time, as were a series of annual music awards.

At the end of 1989 the AMC changed its name to Sounds Australian, which was retained for around 10 years.

In 1993 the AMC established an online presence. In 2007 the AMC's print journal, Sounds Australian, was superseded by the online magazine Resonate, and on 31 March 2009 a new website was launched.

In 2000, the AMC moved to The Arts Exchange in The Rocks, Sydney, next door to its original location in George Street. It remained there until 2013, when it moved to the APRA building in Mountain Street. Around this time much of the physical items were moved into storage off-site, as most of the material had been made available online.

At the end of 2015, a new initiative was launched to support artist development, a series of programs under the name "AMPlify". This included special programs for Indigenous Australian composers, later replaced by a new program, Ngarra-Burria: First Peoples Composers, in partnership with Moogahlin Performing Arts, ANU School of Music, Ensemble Offspring and the Royal Australian Navy Band, with funding support from APRA AMCOS, and in-kind support from EORA College of TAFE.

== Description ==
AMC provides advocacy, representation, and publishing services as well as career support and professional development programmes. Initially focussed on contemporary classical music, its purview has expanded to experimental music, sound art, contemporary jazz, and improvisatory music. It operates as a service organisation rather than a professional association. As of 2020 AMC represented over 750 composers and sound artists.

The AMC is the Australian national section of International Society for Contemporary Music and the IAMIC.

The Centre's collection includes a repository of Australian scores, recordings and teaching kits that numbered 13,000 items by 660 creators in 2017.

== Governance and funding ==
The AMC was established in 1974 by its inaugural director, James Murdoch. For 32 years its CEO was John Davis, who left in 2021. In May 2021, he was succeeded by Catherine Haridy, who had worked in A&R for Mushroom Records and Warner Music Australia and founded her own artist management company in 2006.

Marshall McGuire was appointed chair of the board in 2021.

The Australia Council for the Arts (from 2023 Creative Australia) has provided most of the AMC's funding. Cuts at different times (especially in 2012–3) has caused challenges, but funding has been assured from 2021 to 2024.

== Art Music Awards ==
AMC music awards were first held in 1988 under the banner Sounds Australian, and in 2002, in collaboration with APRA, presented the annual Classical Music Awards. These both continued until 2009, and in 2011 the inaugural Art Music Awards took place.

The AMC co-hosts the Art Music Awards along with APRA AMCOS, which acknowledges excellence among Australian composers, performers and educators in the genres of contemporary classical music, jazz, improvisation, sound art and experimental music.

== Notable represented artists ==
The Australian Music Centre represents Australian composers, improvisers and sound artists. Some notable represented artists include:

- Ross Edwards
- Mary Finsterer
- Peggy Glanville-Hicks
- Brenda Gifford
- Helen Gifford
- Percy Grainger
- Michael Kieran Harvey
- Cat Hope
- Elena Kats-Chernin
- Don Kay
- Bryony Marks

== Publications ==
Print publications by Australia Music Centre include:

- Music Australia : a select list of literature, music scores and sound recordings in print, a journal published 1978–1979 and 1981

== See also ==
- Peggy Glanville-Hicks Address
