= Marshall McGuire =

Australian harpist

Marshall McGuire (born 1965) is an Australian harpist, teacher, conductor and musical administrator.

== Early life and education ==
McGuire was born in Melbourne in 1965.

His interest in the harp was sparked when he saw Harpo Marx playing the instrument in the film A Night at the Opera. He was taught by Huw Jones, harpist with the Melbourne Symphony Orchestra. He studied at VCASS, the Victorian College of the Arts, in Paris with Marie-Claire Jamet and the Royal College of Music, London with Rachel Masters, and baroque harp with Frances Kelly.

== Career ==
From 1988 to 1992, he was principal harpist with the Australian Opera and Ballet Orchestra. He has been a member of the ELISION Ensemble since 1988 and was lecturer in Harp at the Sydney Conservatorium of Music.

He has performed as soloist with the Australian Chamber Orchestra, English String Orchestra, Les Talens Lyriques, Australian Brandenburg Orchestra, Melbourne Symphony Orchestra, and the Australia Ensemble and has appeared at international festivals including Aldeburgh, Melbourne, Milan, Geneva, Brighton, Vienna, Huddersfield, Huntington, and Adelaide.

He has commissioned and premiered more than 100 new works for harp, this achievement was recognised by the 1997 Sounds Australian Award for the Most Distinguished Contribution to the Presentation of Australian Music. His commissions include composers such as Michael Finnissy, Elena Kats-Chernin, Andrew Ford, Gerard Brophy, David Chesworth, Damien Ricketson, Matthew Shlomowitz and Matthew Hindson.

=== Performances and recordings ===
First performances by McGuire include works by Ross Edwards, Anne Boyd, Barry Conyngham, Alessandro Solbiati and Liza Lim. Many composers have sought his guidance in their writing for the harp. He writes: "Composers are always seeking information from harpists about what can and can't be done when writing for harp. While we should always be flattered when approached by a composer, we should also be aware of the boundaries that we set, so that we don't end up with unplayable music – I'd probably have said 'No' to both Richard Wagner and Richard Strauss. Mostly, less is more..."

McGuire has released numerous recordings and has received four ARIA Music Award nominations, winning the award for Best Classical Album for Bower (with Genevieve Lacey). Artists with whom he has worked and recorded include Riley Lee (shakuhachi); Patricia Pollett (viola); and Jane Edwards and Merlyn Quaife (sopranos). In 2011 he recorded Eugene Goossens' Concerto Piece for oboe and two harps with the Melbourne Symphony Orchestra, conducted by Sir Andrew Davis, for Chandos.

In 1998, with Lyle Chan, he co-created A Tale of Two Cities, a radio feature broadcast on ABC Classic FM, which was a monologue based on the lives of such gay composers as Ned Rorem, Leonard Bernstein, Samuel Barber, Virgil Thomson, Aaron Copland, Paul Bowles, Francis Poulenc, Stanley Bate and Reynaldo Hahn.

He made his conducting debut in performances of Mozart's The Magic Flute with Pacific Opera in 1999, and in 2010 he conducted performances of Purcell's Dido and Aeneas at the Macau International Music Festival.From 1996 to 2000 he created a series of chamber music concerts for the Sydney Gay and Lesbian Mardi Gras Festival, the first of their type in the world. From 1999 to 2001 he was curator of the Twilight Chamber Music Series for Sydney Festival, and in 2003 he was artist-in-residence at the Bundanon Trust.

=== Artistic direction ===
In 2003 McGuire was appointed artistic director of the Seymour Group.

From 2013 to 2015, he curated, with Richard Tognetti, the "Haydn for Everyone" series for Melbourne International Arts Festival, programming performances of all 68 string quartets by Joseph Haydn, featuring quartets from Australia and around the world including Debussy Quartet, Modigliani Quartet, Flinders Quartet, Orava Quartet, Quartz, Ironwood, Australian Haydn Ensemble, Australian Chamber Orchestra, and London Haydn Quartet.

From 2015 - 2025, he was Director of Programming at the Melbourne Recital Centre.

In 2020 he curated the Chamber Landscapes series at UKARIA for the Adelaide Festival. Composer + Citizen featured performances by Heath Quartet, Roomful of Teeth, Anthony Marwood, Siobhan Stagg, Ludovico's Band, and the Australian premiere of Lembit Beecher and Hannah Moscovitch's I Have no Stories to Tell You.

He was artistic co-director of the Australian baroque ensemble Ludovico's Band, specialising in Italian and Spanish works of the 17th century, from the group's creation in 2002 until it folded in 2022. Previous performances with the band include Monteverdi's Orfeo at the 2007 Queensland Music Festival; J.S. Bach's St John Passion for Melbourne Recital Centre; a baroque triple bill for Victorian Opera; Mozart's The Marriage of Figaro for Victorian Opera; a semi-staged performance of Monteverdi's Eighth Book of Madrigals – Love + the Art of War; and a CD The Italian Ground on ABC Classics.

Marshall was engaged as Artistic Advisor (Music + Opera) for the Adelaide Festival in September 2025, working with Artistic Director Matthew Lutton and producer Kylie King.

== Recognition ==
In 2003 McGuire was awarded an inaugural creative fellowship from the State Library Victoria to research the works of Peggy Glanville-Hicks. The fellowship enabled him to produce piano reductions of Glanville-Hicks' Letters from Morocco and the final scene from the opera Sappho, and a new edition of the Sonata for Harp.

He received a Churchill Fellowship in 2004 to travel to San Francisco and New York to research baroque performance and contemporary music ensembles.

== Other roles ==
He is the founding president of the New Music Network; was chair of the music committee of the New South Wales Ministry of the Arts; was a member of the Australian Youth Orchestra Artistic Advisory Committee; and was music director of the AYO's National Music Camp in 2003, 2006 and 2008. He was the inaugural curator of the Utzon Music Series from 2006 until 2011 at the Sydney Opera House, and in December 2006 was appointed executive manager, artistic planning, with the West Australian Symphony Orchestra. He was a participant in the Australia 2020 Summit held in April 2008 at Parliament House, Canberra.

In 2018 he was on the selection jury for the ClassicalNEXT conference in Rotterdam, and a jury member for the piano trio section of the Franz Schubert und die Musik der Moderne competition in Graz, Austria.

McGuire was appointed chair of the board of the Australian Music Centre in 2021.

== Discography ==
=== Albums ===
List of albums
Title	Album details
Awakening	Released: 1996; Label: Tall Poppies (TP071); Formats: CD
Spring Sea – Music of Dreams (with Riley Lee)	Released: 2000; Label: ABC Classics (ABC 465757-2); Formats: CD
Floating World (with Riley Lee)	Released: 2004; Label: New World Music (NWCD603); Formats: CD
Resonance	Released: February 2015; Label: ABC Classics; Formats: Digital
Bower (with Genevieve Lacey)	Released: May 2021; Label: Genevieve Lacey; Formats: Digital

== Awards ==
=== AIR Awards ===
The Australian Independent Record Awards (commonly known informally as AIR Awards) is an annual awards night to recognise, promote and celebrate the success of Australia's Independent Music sector.

Year	Nominee / work	Award	Result	Ref.
2022	Bower (with Genevieve Lacey)	Best Independent Classical Album or EP	Won	

=== ARIA Music Awards ===
The ARIA Music Awards is an annual awards ceremony that recognises excellence, innovation, and achievement across all genres of Australian music.

Year	Nominee / work	Award	Result	Ref.
1996	Awakening	Best Classical Album	Nominated	
2000	Spring Sea (with Riley Lee)	Best World Music Album	Nominated	
2003	The Twentieth Century Harp	Best Classical Album	Nominated	
2021	Bower (with Genevieve Lacey)	Best Classical Album	Won	
