= James Murdoch (music advocate) =

Australian music advocate (1930–2010)

James Murdoch (1930–2010), also known by the stage name Jaime Sebastian, was an Australian arts administrator, musicologist, composer, journalist, and broadcaster. He founded and served as the inaugural director of the Australian Music Centre and played an important role in promoting the works of Peggy Glanville-Hicks.

== Early life and education ==
James Murdoch was born in 1930, the only child born to a wharfie in the Sydney suburb of Paddington. His parents were frequently on the move, and by the age of 14, Murdoch had lived in 19 houses and attended 15 schools.

An autodidact, he learned all he could about music of all genres, from the middle ages to the present day. He also learned cello, flute, piano, and violin at the Sydney Conservatorium of Music.

Murdoch gravitated to bohemian circles and befriended Tilly Devine, Bea Miles, and Sunday Reed. He became close friends with other members of the Heide Circle as well.

== Career ==
In 1958, Murdoch was engaged by a Spanish dance theater and toured Australia as their international pianist under the name Jaime Sebastian. He toured with them in Europe, the United Kingdom, and elsewhere. He also assumed the conductor's podium for the company on the strength of his (untrue) claim that he had conducted student orchestras at the Sydney Conservatorium.

He composed two ballets for the dance troupe, one of which was La Espera, which received 450 performances in Europe and Australia. After touring Australia in 1962 under his assumed name, he opted to remain in his home country.

Murdoch became the assistant musical director and company pianist of the new Australian Ballet company. From 1964 until 1968, he was deeply involved in the World Record Club, which included the task of writing over 200 record cover notes each year.

During the 1950s and 1960s, Murdoch was an active member of the International Society for Contemporary Music, serving as secretary of its Melbourne, Sydney, and other Australian branches. In 1965, Murdoch directed the First Festival of Contemporary Music in Melbourne.

Murdoch developed a tendon contraction through overuse of his hands and switched his career from being a pianist to being a concert promoter based in London. Among others, his company managed Cathy Berberian, Harrison Birtwistle, Leo Brouwer, Paul Crossley, Peter Maxwell Davies, the Pierrot Players (later known as the Fires of London), Hans Werner Henze, Igor Kipnis, Roger Woodward, and the Budapest Chamber Orchestra.

He was associated with the filmmaker Ken Russell and assisted in organising the music for The Devils and The Boy Friend (both 1971).

In 1973, Murdoch was the first musical adviser to the Australia Council. In 1975, he was appointed to be the first National Director of the Australian Music Centre (AMC), and in 1980, he was elected to be the world president of the Music Information Centre's Professional Branch.

In 1981, Murdoch was sacked by the Music Board of the Australia Council, the funding body for the AMC, for what they perceived as inept financial administration. He was then rehired as a music consultant to the Australia Council but was dismissed again when they deemed his report on the state of music publishing in Australia as inadequate. He responded by suing the board for unfair dismissal, which later ended in an out-of-court settlement.

Murdoch recorded 60 filmed interviews with leading writers, composers, and artists, now held at the National Film and Sound Archive.

He influenced composers like Richard Meale and Peggy Glanville-Hicks to return from self-imposed artistic exile overseas. After Glanville-Hicks died in 1990, he championed the Peggy Glanville-Hicks Composers Trust and Peggy Glanville-Hicks House, and he researched and wrote her biography, Peggy Glanville-Hicks – A Transposed Life (2002).

== Chopin's walking stick ==
Murdoch inherited a walking stick that had belonged to Frédéric Chopin. It had been given to Chopin by the monks at Valldemossa, the monastery he and George Sand stayed at on Majorca in 1838–39. Chopin returned it to the monks when he left. In 1934, the writer Robert Graves took up residence near there, and the monks gave him the walking stick. Graves gave it to Peggy Glanville-Hicks when she stayed with him while they discussed his libretto for her opera Nausicaa, based on Graves's book Homer's Daughter. She gave it to the American pianist Oliver Daniels. After Daniels' death, his partner gave it to Murdoch, who took it to Bali. Before his death, he gave it to his friend Shane Simpson in Sydney.

== Later life ==
In 1990, Murdoch relocated to Bali and continued to participate actively in both Australian and Asian arts circles. He died there in 2010, aged 80.

His papers are lodged with the National Library of Australia.

== Selected works ==
- Australia's Contemporary Composers (1972)
- Notes on a Landscape (a documentary film on 10 Australian composers, with Bill Fitzwater; 1980)
- Handbook of Australian Music (1983)
- The Arts on Film (1988)
- Peggy Glanville-Hicks – A Transposed Life (2002)
