= Columbus Auditorium =

Venue in Columbus, Ohio

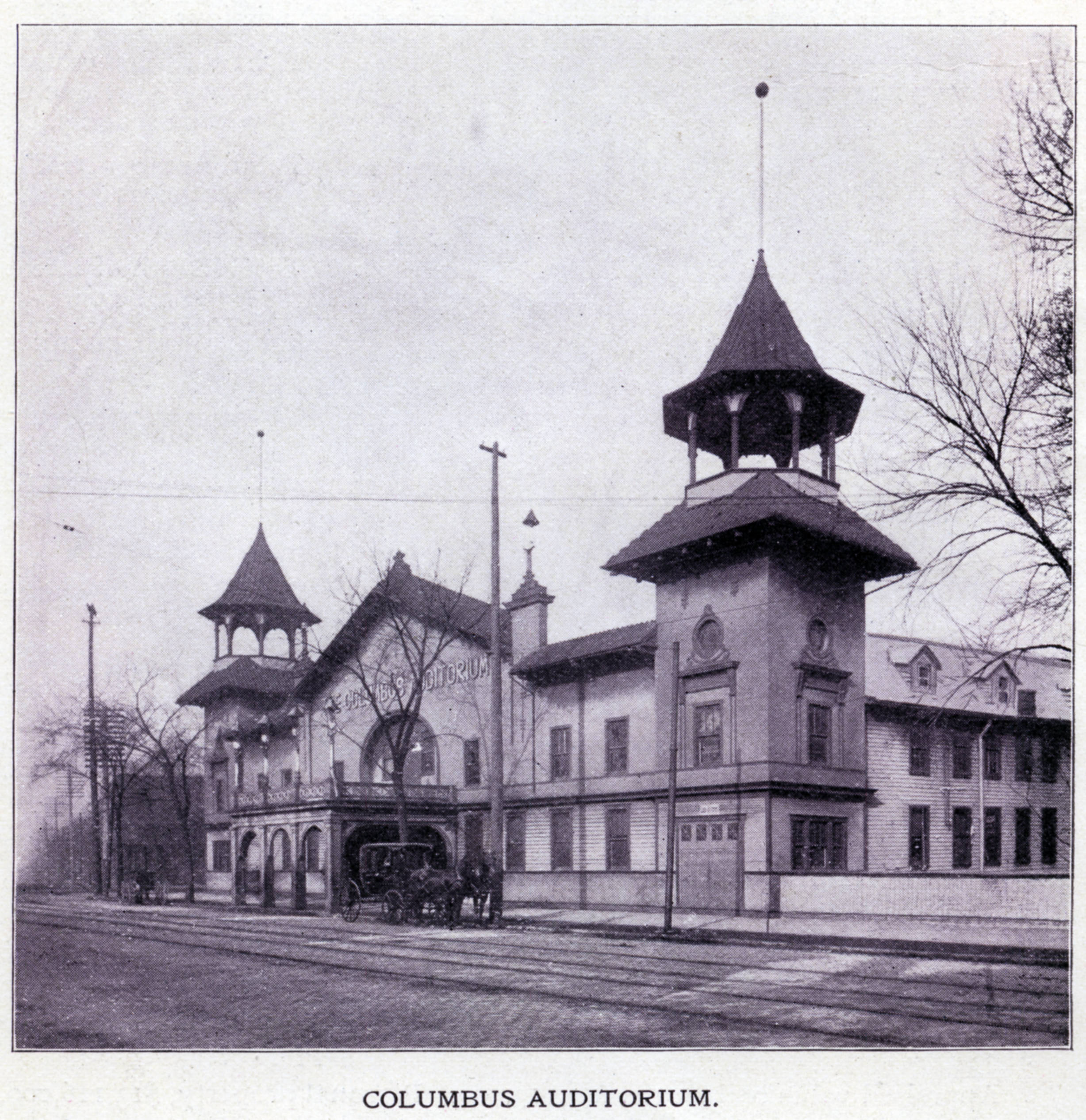
- The auditorium, published 1901
- Interactive map pinpointing the buildings' locations

General information
- Status: Demolished
- Location: W. Goodale Street, 199 S. Front Street, Columbus, Ohio
- Coordinates: 39.973987°N 83.004233°W, 39.958188°N 83.002184°W

Design and construction
- Architecture firm: Yost & Packard

The Columbus Auditorium was the name of two mixed-use venues in Columbus, Ohio. The first was extant from 1897 to 1910; the second stood from 1927 to 1992. For the last 50 years of its existence, the auditorium building was known as the Lazarus Annex, an expansion of the flagship Lazarus department store.

== Goodale Street Auditorium ==
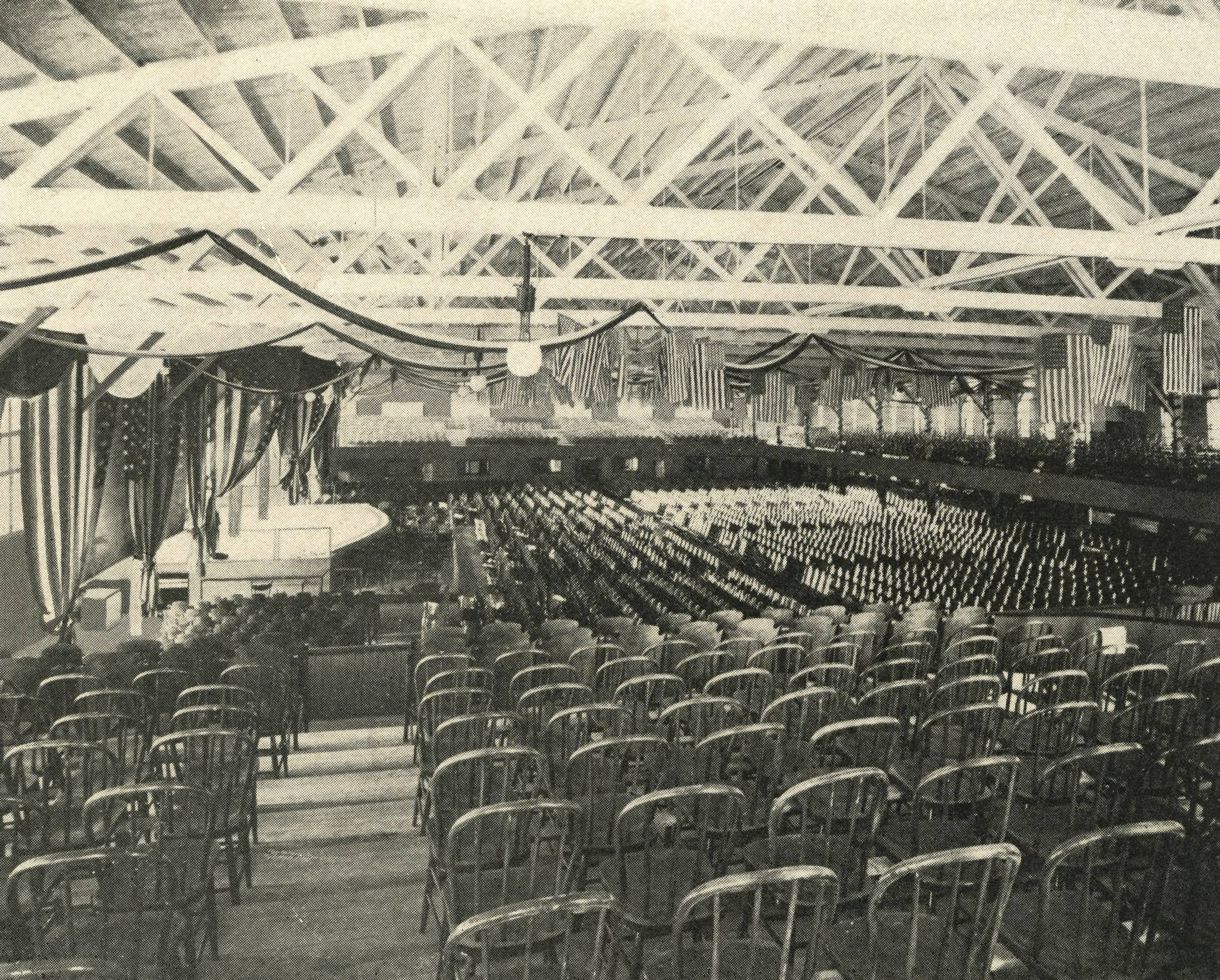
Auditorium interior, published 1901

The Goodale Street Auditorium (also known as the Columbus Auditorium) opened on June 24, 1897. Architects Yost & Packard designed the auditorium; in doing so they remodeled an older structure, the Park Roller Skating Rink, which had opened on March 17, 1885.

The building sat at the northeast corner of Park and West Goodale Streets. It was a wooden building with ornate towers on its four corners. The structure held conventions, revivals, and circus events. Evangelist Billy Sunday was a tenant of the building, and it also held the first official game of the Ohio State Buckeyes men's basketball team, in 1897.

One of the last events held in the building was the first Columbus Auto Show, in 1909. The show's organizers planned to continue hosting the event in the building, though a heavy snow on February 18, 1910 collapsed the building's roof. The structure was abandoned and eventually demolished. The site was later occupied by Haft's Acre, a boxing and wrestling arena run by Al Haft. The site presently holds a below-grade section of Interstate 670.

== Downtown building ==
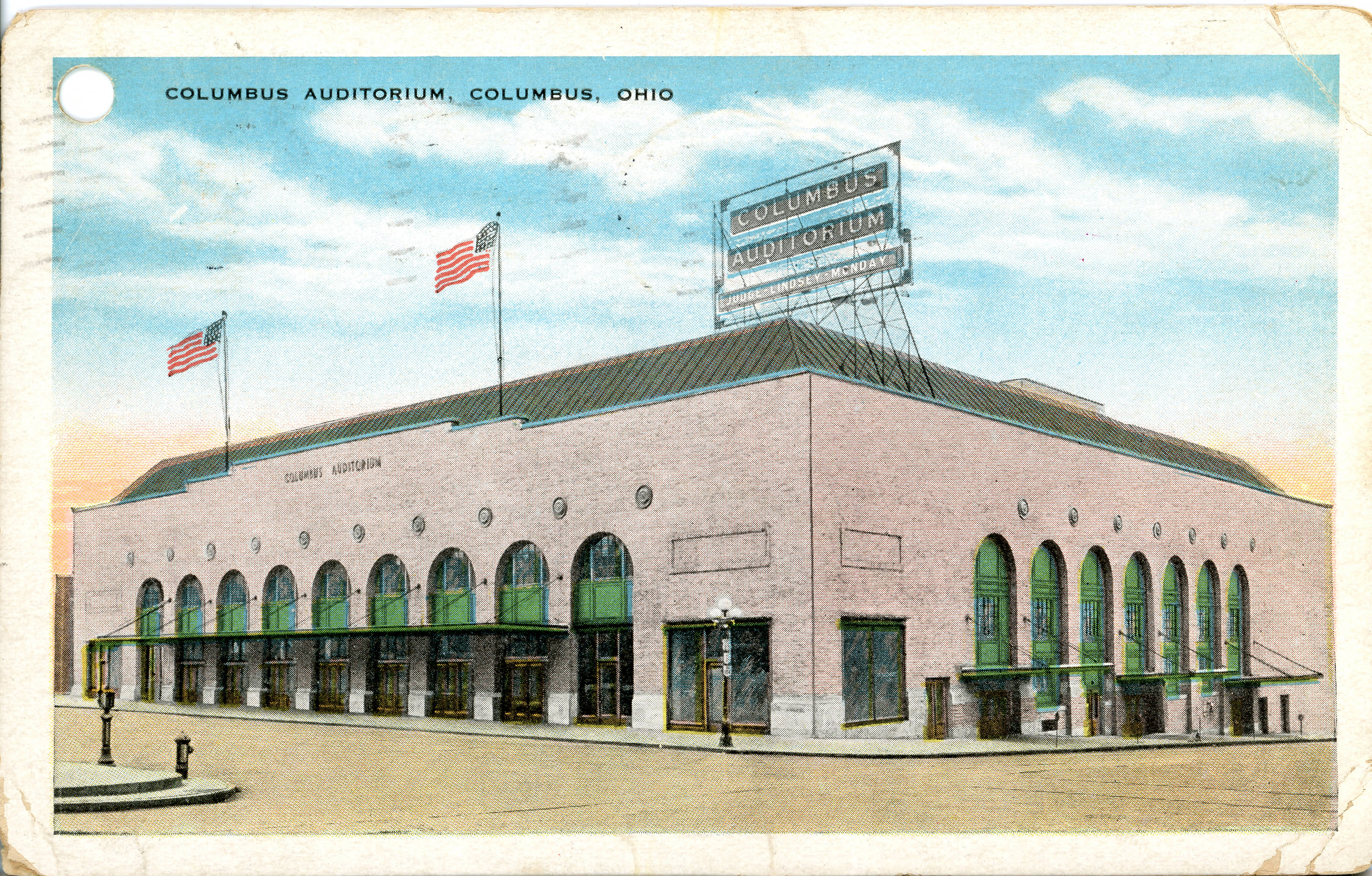
The downtown Columbus Auditorium, postmarked 1931.

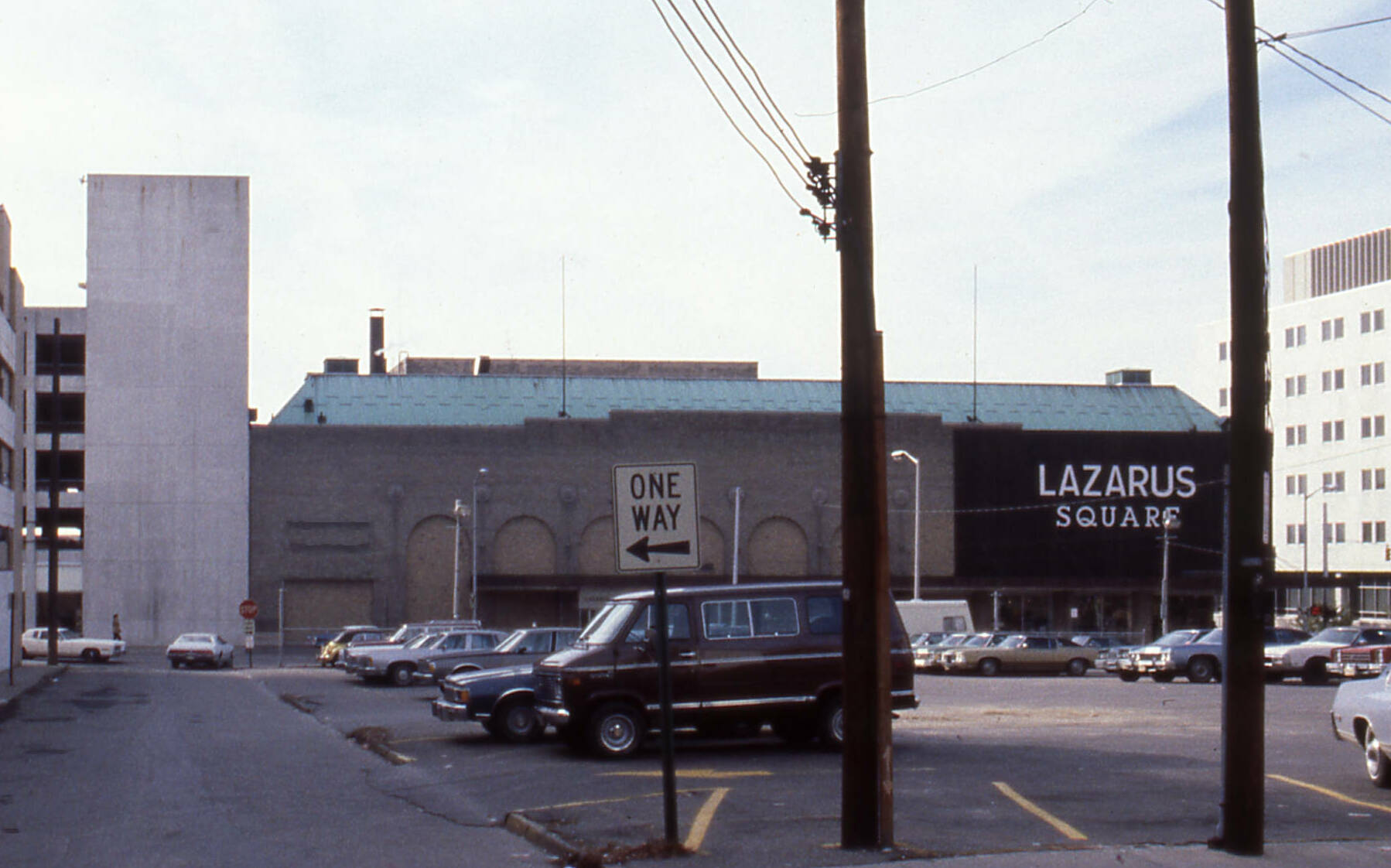
The building as Lazarus Square, late 20th c.

A proposal for a new Columbus Auditorium was announced in 1919. The Columbus Exposition Company proposed an eight-story building at Rich and Front streets, with a 10,000-seat arena, offices, commercial space, and an interurban train station. The building was never built, suggested because the proposers were unrealistic about its cost.

A new building called the Columbus Auditorium was built in Downtown Columbus, at the southwest corner of Town and Front streets in 1927. The structure had 62,500 square feet (5,810 m^{2}) of exhibition space, with a seating capacity of 6,000. It was a rectangular brick building with window arcades on its north, east, and west sides. The facades also featured brick panels and round medallions, but were largely unornamented. The walls terminated in parapets with stone copings. The building had a hipped metal roof.

The auditorium opened on September 12, 1927; its opening attraction was the two-week Columbus First Annual Fall Festival, a furniture show, style show, pageant, and commercial and industrial event. The auditorium hosted the annual Columbus Auto Show, which had been held at the Franklin County Memorial Hall in years prior. The building also regularly held operas in its early years; opera enthusiasts were among the groups that had urged the auditorium's construction, as they disliked Memorial Hall's stage. It also hosted boxing and wrestling matches, and the Ohio State Buckeyes played basketball games in the building during its 1942–43 and 1943–44 seasons (armed forces had taken over use of the Fairgrounds Coliseum during World War II).

In May 1944, the building was sold to the Lazarus department store company, which operated its flagship store nearby. The company announced it would house an annex to the store in the building on August 30, 1945. The building would hold the store's housewares, appliances, and service departments. Lazarus renovated the building for its purposes, removing the auditorium interior and altering much of the exterior. The building, by then known as the Lazarus Annex, was demolished in 1992.

== See also ==
- List of demolished buildings and structures in Columbus, Ohio
