= Gerard Brophy =

South African cricketer

Personal information
- Full name: Gerard Louis Brophy
- Born: 26 November 1975 (age 50); Welkom, Orange Free State, South Africa
- Height: 5 ft 11 in (1.80 m)
- Batting: Right-handed
- Bowling: Right-arm medium
- Role: Wicket-keeper

Domestic team information
- Years: Team
- 1996–1997: Transvaal B
- 1998–1999: Gauteng
- 1999–2001: Free State
- 2002–2005: Northamptonshire
- 2006–2012: Yorkshire
- FC debut: 31 October 1996 Transvaal B v Eastern Province B
- Last FC: 6 June 2012 Yorkshire v Glamorgan
- LA debut: 5 December 1997 Gauteng v Easterns
- Last LA: 9 August 2012 Yorkshire v Northamptonshire

Career statistics
Competition	FC	LA	T20
Matches	126	123	60
Runs scored	5,520	2,069	776
Batting average	32.09	25.54	19.40
100s/50s	8/27	0/13	0/2
Top score	185	93*	57*
Catches/stumpings	301/22	118/25	28/8
- Source: Espncricinfo.com, 21 August 2012

Gerard Louis Brophy (born 26 November 1975, Welkom, Orange Free State, South Africa) is a first-class cricketer, latterly contracted to Yorkshire. He has also played for Ireland, Free State, Northamptonshire and Transvaal in a well travelled career.

== Education and career ==
He was educated at Christian Brothers College, Boksburg, and made his first-class debut in the 1996/97 South African season. Standing relatively tall for a keeper at five feet eleven inches, he has taken 301 first-class catches and completed 22 stumpings. A right hand batsman, he has scored 5,520 runs at 32.09 with eight hundreds and a best of 185. He has played in 123 List A matches, scoring 2,069 runs at 25.54 with a top score of 93* and 60 Twenty20 games, making 776 runs at 19.40 with a best of 57*.

== Citizenship ==
Although born in South Africa, he holds a British passport, and so is not considered an overseas player in the English first class game. He represented East Transvaal in that sport in 1991. He struggled with the bat in his first season with Yorkshire in 2006, and faced a fight for a first team place with Simon Guy and Greg Wood. However, he prevailed, although Brophy latterly shared keeping duties for Yorkshire with Jonny Bairstow.

== Change of career path ==
In August 2012, Yorkshire released Brophy from the remainder of his playing contract, and signed Andrew Hodd on loan from Sussex, to act as wicketkeeping cover for Bairstow in the County Championship. Brophy, who had been at Yorkshire since 2006, was informed that his contract would not be renewed for 2013, and was free to pursue other opportunities.
