= Graham Pushee =

Australian counter-tenor (born 1954)

Graham Pushee (born 1954) is an Australian countertenor. Together with the Australian Brandenburg Orchestra, conducted by Paul Dyer, Pushee was nominated for the 1995 ARIA Award for Best Classical Album for the album Handel: Arias.

== Life and career ==
Graham Pushee was born on April 25, 1954 in Sydney, Australia. His first musical experiences were performing in a children's choir as a boy. He originally intended to pursue a career as a lawyer before deciding to pursue a career as a vocalist. He studied singing in his native city with Welsh tenor David Parker.

In 1973 Pushee made his opera debut performing the role of Oberon in the Australian premiere of Benjamin Britten's A Midsummer Night's Dream which was staged in a professional production at the University of New South Wales. He returned there in 1976 to perform the title role in George Frideric Handel's Orlando. During this period he also performed in several programs of early music with Winsome Evans's Renaissance Players. He also performed in several oratorios and other works from the classical music vocal literature in Australia from 1973-1977.

After this period, Pushee relocated to Europe in 1977 after being awarded a Winston Churchill Fellowship which enabled him to study voice with countertenor Paul Esswood in London and pursue training at the Schola Cantorum Basiliensis in Switzerland with Kurt Widmer and Rene Jacobs. He lived in Switzerland for several years, during which time he worked as a concert and opera singer in Europe. He was particularly active at the Händel-Festspiele Karlsruhe where he performed title roles in many Handel operas, including Poro, Orlando, Admeto, Scipione, Il pastor fido, and Giulio Cesare. He was notably the first countertenor to ever perform the latter role; first tackling that part in 1987 at the Paris Opera.

In 1994 Pushee returned to Australia to portray the title role in Opera Australia's production of Giulio Cesare; a role he also performed with the Houston Grand Opera. That same year he portrayed Andronicus in Handel's Tamerlano with Opera North. In 1995 he sang Giulio Cesare again in Melbourne.

== Discography ==
=== Albums ===
Title	Details
Handel: Arias - Alcina, Giulio Cesare, Rinaldo (with Australian Brandenburg Orchestra, Paul Dyer)	Released: 1994; Label: ABC Classics; Format: CD
Handel: Highlights from Julius Caesar (with Yvonne Kenny, Australian Opera and Ballet Orchestra, Richard Hickox)	Released: 1994; Label: ABC Classics; Format: CD
Vivaldi (with Aurora Musicale)	Released: 1997; Label: ABC Classics; Format: CD
Handel: Tamerlano	Released: 2001; Label: ABC Classics; Format: CD

== Awards and nominations ==
=== ARIA Awards ===
The ARIA Music Awards are presented annually since 1987 by the Australian Recording Industry Association (ARIA).

Year	Nominee / work	Award	Result
1995	Handel: Opera Arias	Best Classical Album	Nominated

=== Mo Awards ===
The Australian Entertainment Mo Awards (commonly known informally as the Mo Awards), were annual Australian entertainment industry awards. They recognise achievements in live entertainment in Australia from 1975 to 2016.

Year	Nominee / work	Award	Result (wins only)
1995	Graham Pushee	Operatic Performance of the Year	Won
