= Matthew Hindson =

Australian composer

Matthew John Hindson AM (born 12 September 1968) is an Australian composer.

== Biography ==
Matthew Hindson was born in Wollongong, New South Wales, in 1968. He studied composition at the Universities of Sydney and Melbourne with composers including Peter Sculthorpe, Eric Gross, Brenton Broadstock and Ross Edwards.

Hindson's works have been performed by ensembles and orchestras throughout his native Australia, including most of its professional symphony orchestras and chamber groups. Overseas, his compositions have been presented in New Zealand, Germany, France, Austria, the UK, the Netherlands, Portugal, the United States, Japan, Malaysia, Canada and Thailand, and have been featured at such key events as the 1994 and 2000 Gaudeamus Music Weeks in Amsterdam, the 1997 ISCM Festival in Copenhagen and the 1998 Paris Composers Rostrum.

His music often displays influences of popular music styles within a classical music context, and, as a result, musical elements such as driving repeated rhythms and high dynamic levels are typically found in his works. Indeed, directness and immediacy are common features in much of his music. One of his most notable works, Speed (1996), was thought by some to be inspired by the 1994 hit film Speed; however, Hindson has denied this connection.

In 1999 Hindson was the attached composer to the Sydney Symphony Orchestra. Works written during this attachment include Boom-Box and In Memoriam: Amplified Cello Concerto (the latter was subsequently nominated for an APRA-AMC award for Best Orchestral Work of 2001). He was also the attached composer with the Sydney Youth Orchestra in the same year, for which he was commissioned to write a violin concerto. In 2002 he was the featured composer with Musica Viva Australia for which he has written a number of new commissions for Kristjan Järvi's Absolute Ensemble, baroque violinist Andrew Manze, the Australian oboist Diana Doherty and the Belcea String Quartet, and Duo Sol.

In May 2002, the Sydney Dance Company toured Australia to much acclaim with a new 90-minute production, Ellipse, choreographed by their Artistic Director, Graeme Murphy, and danced entirely to Hindson's music. Playing to packed houses, it broke box-office records for the SDC. They toured it to the US in 2004.

In September 2003, Hindson was a featured composer at the Vale of Glamorgan Festival in Wales, during which fourteen of his works were performed by a variety of ensembles. He was the attached composer to The Queensland Orchestra in 2003/2004, one result of which was his Percussion Concerto, written for Dame Evelyn Glennie and premiered in Brisbane in 2006. In addition, his music was set to a full-evening dance presentation by Ballett Schindowski in Gelsenkirchen, Germany, in January 2004.

Other compositions include two works for the Orchestras of Australia Network, a flute concerto entitled House Music for American flautist Marina Piccinini, premiered with the London Philharmonic Orchestra in December 2006, a Concerto for Two Pianos written for Pascal and Ami Rogé, three ballets written for David Bintley - two commissioned by Birmingham Royal Ballet and one by Sarasota Ballet, and a Soprano Saxophone Concerto - written for Amy Dickson. Matthew Hindson's music is published by Faber Music (UK). A disc of three of his orchestral pieces was recorded by Trust Records with the New Zealand Symphony Orchestra and released in August 2008.

As well as working as a composer, Hindson lectures in the Arts Music Unit and is Associate Professor and Chair of Composition at the Sydney Conservatorium of Music. He has recently co-authored a book entitled "Music Composition Toolbox", published by Science Press. Hindson was from 2004 to 2010 the artistic director of the Aurora Festival, a new festival of contemporary music based in Western Sydney. In 2017, Maralinga (2009/arr.2011) had its US premiere performance at the Naumburg Orchestral Concerts, in the Naumburg Bandshell, Central Park, in the summer series.

== Honours ==
Matthew Hindson was appointed a Member of the Order of Australia in 2006, for "service to the arts as a leading Australian composer and teacher of music, and through the wide promotion of musical works to new audiences".

== Selected works ==
=== Stage works ===
- Symphony No 2: e=mc2, ballet in one act, 2009
- Faster, ballet in one act, 2011
- A Comedy of Errors, ballet in two acts, 2022
- Imposter (after Mozart), ballet in one act, 2022
- My Brilliant Career, ballet in one act, 2023

=== Orchestral ===
- Homage to Metallica, 1994/97
- Speed, 1996
- LiteSpeed, 1996
- Rave-Elation (Extended Mix), 1997
- RPM, 1996/98
- Rave-Elation (Schindowski Mix), 1997/2003
- Boom-Box, 1999
- In Memoriam: Amplified Cello Concerto, 2000
- Violin Concerto No. 1 (Australian Postcards), 2000
  1. Wind Turbine at Kooragang Island
  2. Westerway
  3. Grand Final Day
- Headbanger, 2001
- Rave-Elation, 2002
- A Symphony of Modern Objects, 2003
- Auto-Electric, 2003
- Concerto for Percussion, 2005
- An Infernal Machine, 2006
- House Music (Flute Concerto), 2006
- Flash Madness, 2006
- Kalkadungu (co-composed with William Barton), 2007
- Ictalurus Punctatus, 2008
- Dangerous Creatures, 2008
- Symphony No 2: e=mc2, one-act ballet, 2009
- Energy, 2009
- Concerto for Two Pianos, 2011
- Bright Red Overture for full orchestra, solo trumpet and didjeridu, 2013
- Returned Soldier, The Symphony No 3, 2014
- It is better to be feared than loved, for SATB chorus and orchestra, 2014
- Concerto for Soprano Saxophone & Orchestra, 2019
- Big Steel, 2022
- Dancing with Dinosaurs, 2023
- Rock Star, amplified cello and orchestra, 2026

=== String orchestra ===
- Technologic 1–2 for string orchestra and percussion, 1998
- Whitewater for 12 solo strings, 1999–2000
- The Rave and the Nightingale for string quartet and string orchestra, 2001
- Balkan Connection string orchestra, 2003
- Gentle Giant, 2003
- Didjeribluegrass didjeridu, string orchestra and percussion, 2005
- Song and Dance, string orchestra, 2006
- Crime and Punishment double-bass and string orchestra, 2009
- Maralinga violin and string orchestra (named after the 1950s British nuclear test site in the Australian outback), 2009/arr.2011
- Bright Stars for string orchestra of mixed abilities, with piano, 2016
- Atomic Tangerine for string orchestra, or string ensemble, 2017
- Nothing is Forever, for string orchestra, 2018

=== Ensemble ===
- Lucky Seven for 10 percussionists, 1995
- Siegfried Interlude No.4 – The Ride of the (Viola) Valkyries 8 violas, 1998
- Technologic 145, for chamber ensemble of 13 players, 1998
- Siegfried Interlude No.1 for brass ensemble, 1999
- Whitewater for 12 solo strings, 1999–2000
- Comin' Right Atcha, for amplified chamber ensemble of 8 players, 2002
- Comin' Right Atcha, for chamber ensemble of 14 players, 2002, 2006
- Spirit Song, for chamber ensemble of 5 players, 2003/2006
- Septet, for chamber ensemble of 7 players, 2009
- Beauty for cello and chamber ensemble of 6 players, 2009
- This Year's Apocalypse for chamber ensemble of 14 players, 2016
- Arrival for carillon, 2017
- Trumpet Concerto for solo trumpet and chamber ensemble of 7 players, 2018–20

=== Chamber music ===
- Prelude and Estampie for viola and piano, 1986
- Four Score for 4 solo violins, 1992
- Little Chrissietina's Magic Fantasy for 2 violins, 1994
- DeathStench for amplified flute, amplified clarinet and piano, 1995
- Nintendo Music for clarinet in A and piano, 1995
- Five Movements for saxophone quartet, 1996
- GameBoy Music for clarinet and piano, 1997
- Two Marine Portraits for violin, viola and electronics, 1997
- Chrissietina's Magic Fantasy for violin and viola, 1998
- Ignition: Positive for trumpet or alto saxophone and piano, 1998
- Jungle Fever for cello or tenor saxophone and piano, 1998
- Night Pieces for oboe or soprano saxophone and piano, 1998
- Love Serenade for cello or bassoon and piano, 1998
- n-trance for solo harp, 1998
- Lament for viola and piano, 1996/2002
- Rush for guitar and string quartet, 1999
- Rush for oboe and string quartet, 1999/2001
- Siegfried Interlude No.2 for wind octet, or soprano saxophone and piano, or clarinet and piano, 1999
- Siegfried Interlude No.3 for 3 percussionists, 1999
- Always On Time for violin and cello, 2001
- Pulse Magnet for 2 pianos and 2 percussion, 2001
- Baroquerie, Sonata for Baroque Violin and Harpsichord, 2002
- Industrial Night Music (String Quartet No. 1), 2003
- Basement Art Guru and Other Pieces for solo violin, 2004
- Didjeribluegrass for didjeridu and string quartet, 2005
- Piano Trio, 2006
- Song of Life for solo violin, 2007
- The Metallic Violin for solo violin, 2007
- Light Music for wind quintet, 2007
- Video Game Dreaming for clarinet quartet, 2007
- The Metallic Violins for two violins, 2008
- Shakedown for amplified shakuhachi & CD, 2008
- Violin Concertino: Summer Stories for violin and piano, 2009
- Maralinga for violin and piano, 2009
- Funeral Windows for basset clarinet, 2009
- Big Heart for string quartet, 2009
- Mandalay for solo violin, 2009
- Septet for flute, horn and string quintet, 2009
- The Flash for solo xylophone, 2010
- Video Game Dreaming for saxophone quartet, 2010
- Light is both a particle and a wave for flute, clarinet in A, piano and string quartet, 2010
- Repetepetition for soprano saxophone and piano, 2011
- A Vision in Jade for two violins, 2011/rev.2020
- Remembering Dixie for violin and piano, 2012
- Song for Sophie for violin and piano, 2012
- Epic Diva for piano quartet, 2012
- The stars above us all for chamber orchestra, 2012
- Repetepetition for flute/piccolo and vibraphone, 2013
- Repetepetition for flute/piccolo and piano, 2013
- String Quartet No 2, 2013
- Rush for piano trio, 2015
- String Quartet No 3: Ngeringa, 2015
- String Quartet No 4 for string quartet and solo percussion, 2016
- Scenes from 'Romeo & Juliet' for saxophone quartet, 2016
- Funeral Oration for solo trumpet, 2016
- Lounge Music arrangement of 3rd movement of flute concerto House Music for clarinet and piano, 2016
- Odysseus and the Sirens, for flute and piano, 2017
- String Quartet No 5 (Celebration), 2017
- Champagne Fanfare, for two flutes, 2017
- After Bach, for string quartet, 2018
- 1,2,3,4,5,6,7,8, for violin and cello, 2018
- After Bach, for two baroque violins and viola da gamba, 2018
- Violin Sonata No 1 - 'Dark Matter', for violin and piano, 2018
- Heroes, for solo soprano saxophone, 2020
- Hey, for solo snare drum, 2020
- Andante Amoroso, for violin and viola, 2021
- Roadside Overdrive, for solo violin, 2026

=== Piano ===
- AK-47, 1993
- Moments of Plastic Jubilation, 2000
- Monkey Music for Toy Piano and Cymbal Monkey, 2009
- Big Bang for two pianos, 2013
- Visible Weapon for two pianos and electronics, 2013
- La Salsa Sensuale, 2020
- Sad Piano Vol.1, 2022

=== Choral ===
- Pi, 1999
- Velvet Dreams, 1999
- The Blue Alice, 2000
- Heartland, 2001
- It is better to be feared than loved, for SATB chorus and orchestra, 2014
- Electric Rain, for SAB chorus & symphonic wind band, 2019
- da-bi-du, for unaccompanied SSATBarB voices, 2019

=== Vocal ===
- Insect Songs, mezzo-soprano and guitar, 1998
- Central Australian Song for soprano and chamber ensemble of 5 players, 2009
- Saviour of the Heathens (on "Nun komm, der Heiden Heiland"), solo tenor, cello and chamber organ, 2017

=== Symphonic wind band ===
- RPM, 2002
- Headbanger, 2003
- Requiem for a City (co-composed with Paul Mac), 2015
- Electric Rain, for SAB chorus & symphonic wind band, 2019
