= ARIA Award for Best Classical Album =

Annual Australian music industry award

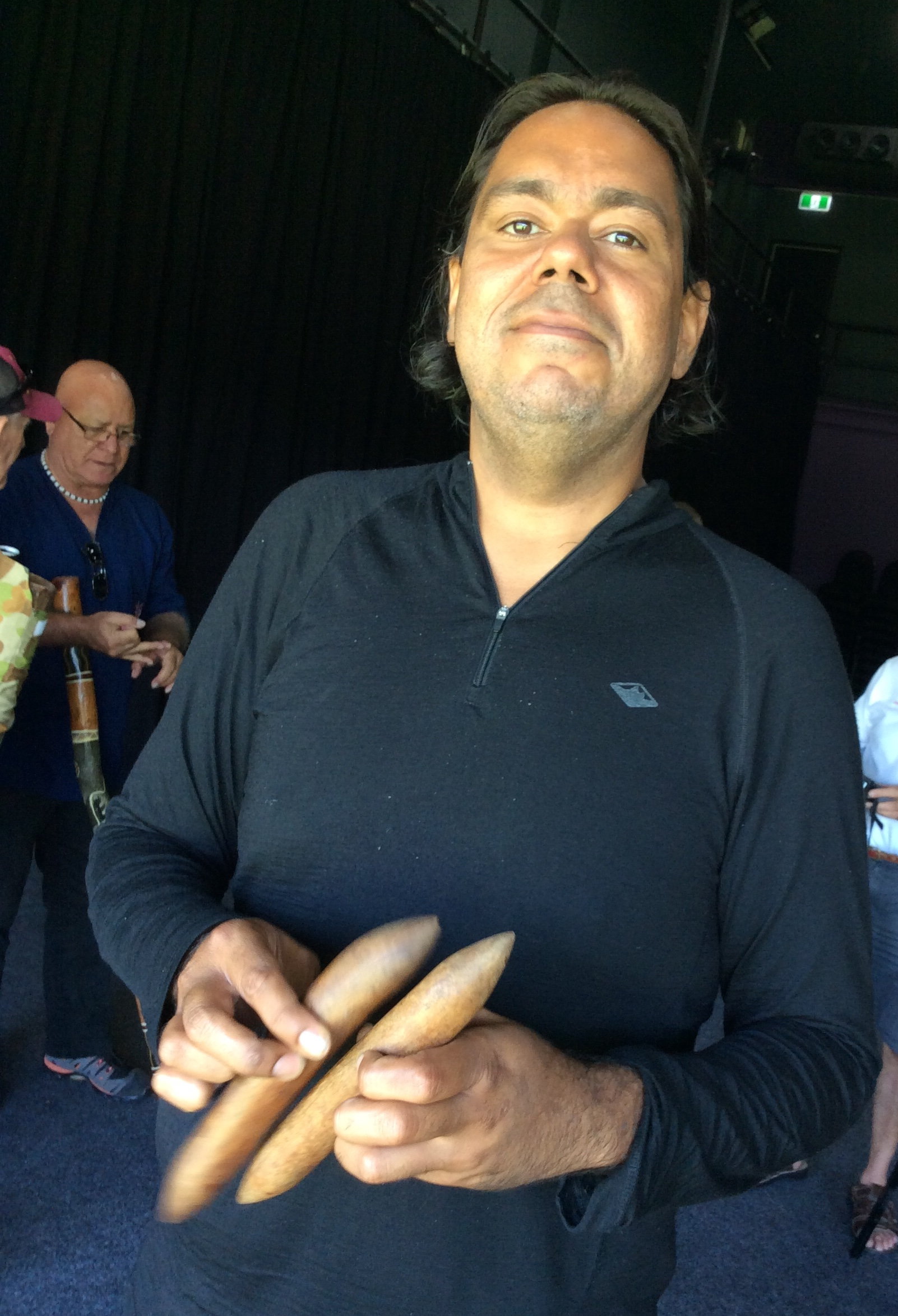
- William Barton won alongside the Omega Ensemble in 2026
- Country: Australia
- Presented by: Australian Recording Industry Association (ARIA)
- First award: 1987
- Currently held by: William Barton and Omega Ensemble – Gift – Our Breath of Life (2026)
- Website: ariaawards.com.au

The ARIA Music Award for Best Classical Album, is an award presented within the Fine Arts Awards at the annual ARIA Music Awards. The ARIA Awards recognise "the many achievements of Aussie artists across all music genres", and have been given by the Australian Recording Industry Association (ARIA) since 1987.

Classical albums by Australian solo artists and groups are eligible, as well as Australian featured artists or soloists involved with non-Australian ensembles or orchestras (providing the album packaging credits the Australian/s as the featured artist/s). It is judged by a specialist judging school of between 40 and 100 representatives experienced with classical music.

The Australian Brandenburg Orchestra has received the award five times. The Australian Chamber Orchestra has been a three-time winner, with the ACO's Richard Tognetti receiving a further two awards for his solo violin recordings.

== Winners and nominees ==
In the following table, the winner is highlighted in a separate colour, and in boldface; the nominees are those that are not highlighted or in boldface. Nominees from 1988 are not available in published sources.

Winner marked in a separate colour

Year	Winner(s)	Album title
**1987** (1st)
**1987** (1st)	**Barry Conyngham**	**Southern Cross Ice Carving**
**1987** (1st)	Australian Chamber Orchestra	Mozart in Delphi
**1987** (1st)	Grant Foster	Rhapsody for Piano and Orchestra
**1987** (1st)	Robert Allworth	Last Look at Bronte
**1987** (1st)	Sydney University Chamber Choir	The Victoria Requiem
**1988** (2nd)	**Australian Opera**	**Voss**
**1989** (3rd)
**1989** (3rd)	**Flederman**	**Flederman**
**1989** (3rd)	George Dreyfus	Rush - The Adventures of Sebastian the Fox and Other Goodies
**1989** (3rd)	Jennifer McGregor	The Jennifer McGregor Album
**1989** (3rd)	Sydney Symphony Orchestra, Australian Youth Orchestra, Joan Carden, John Howard	Australia Day / Child of Australia
**1989** (3rd)	Various Artists	Tropic of Capricorn
**1990** (4th)
**1990** (4th)	**Tasmanian Symphony Chamber Players**	**Vivaldi: The Four Seasons**
**1990** (4th)	Australian Youth Orchestra	Works of Koehne, Stravinsky, Messiaen, Ravel
**1990** (4th)	Geoffrey Collins & David Miller	Flute Australia Volume 2
**1990** (4th)	Jane Rutter	Nocturnes & Preludes for Flutes
**1990** (4th)	Various Artists	Landscapes
**1991** (5th)
**1991** (5th)	**Stuart Challender, Sydney Symphony Orchestra**	**Sculthorpe: Orchestral Works**
**1991** (5th)	David Helfgott	David Helgott
**1991** (5th)	Geoffrey Simon, Melbourne Symphony Orchestra	Percy Grainger: Orchestral Works
**1991** (5th)	Hartley Newnham & Nicholas Routley	Hermit of Green Light
**1991** (5th)	The Choir of Christ Church St Laurence	Victoria: Missa Surge Propera
**1992** (6th)
**1992** (6th)	**Stuart Challender, Sydney Symphony Orchestra**	**Vine: 3 Symphonies**
**1992** (6th)	Australian Ensemble	Cafe Concertino
**1992** (6th)	The Australian Opera	Mozart Arias & Scenes
**1992** (6th)	Geoffrey Lancaster	Fortepiano
**1992** (6th)	Roger Woodward	Prokofiev Piano Works
**1993** (7th)
**1993** (7th)	**Australian Chamber Orchestra & Richard Tognetti**	**Janáček: Kreutzer Sonata for Strings, Barber: Adagio for Strings, Walton: Sonata for Strings**
**1993** (7th)	The Brandenburg Orchestra	The Brandenburg Orchestra
**1993** (7th)	West Australian Symphony Orchestra	The Transposed Heads
**1993** (7th)	Geoffrey Lancaster	Mozart Sonatas for Fortepiano
**1993** (7th)	Roger Woodward	The Music of Frédéric Chopin
**1994** (8th)
**1994** (8th)	**Dene Olding, Sydney Symphony Orchestra, Challender, Porcelijn**	**Ross Edwards Orchestral Works**
**1994** (8th)	Australian Chamber Orchestra & Richard Tognetti	Mendelssohn: Octet in E Flat for Strings Op. 20 Sinfonia No. 9 in C. Swiss
**1994** (8th)	Australian Chamber Orchestra & Richard Tognetti	Symphony Serenades and Suites
**1994** (8th)	Nigel Butterley	John Cage
**1994** (8th)	Dene Olding, Melbourne Symphony Orchestra, Iwaki	Violin Concertos
**1995** (9th)
**1995** (9th)	**Yvonne Kenny, Melbourne Symphony Orchestra, Vladimir Kamirski**	**Simple Gifts**
**1995** (9th)	Adelaide Symphony Orchestra, David Porcelijn, János Fürst	Powerhouse Three Poems of Byron – Capriccio Nocturnes Unchained Melody
**1995** (9th)	Duncan Gifford	Debussy Preludes Books I & II
**1995** (9th)	Slava Grigoryan	Spirit of Spain
**1995** (9th)	Graham Pushee, Australian Brandenburg Orchestra, Paul Dyer	Handel: Opera Arias
**1996** (10th)
**1996** (10th)	**Australian Chamber Orchestra**	**Peter Sculthorpe: Music for Strings**
**1996** (10th)	Australian Chamber Orchestra	Spirit
**1996** (10th)	Australian Ensemble	Shostakovich
**1996** (10th)	Macquarie Trio	Beethoven Piano Trios
**1996** (10th)	Marshall McGuire	Awakening
**1997** (11th)
**1997** (11th)	**Adelaide Symphony Orchestra, David Porcelijn**	**Peter Sculthorpe: Sun Music**
**1997** (11th)	Tasmanian Symphony Orchestra, David Porcelijn	Peter Sculthorpe: The Fifth Continent
**1997** (11th)	Tamara Anna Cislowska	The Enchanted Isle
**1997** (11th)	Renaissance Players	Mirror of Light
**1997** (11th)	Australian Chamber Orchestra	Il Tramonto - The Sunset
**1998** (12th)
**1998** (12th)	**Yvonne Kenny, Paul Dyer, Australian Brandenburg Orchestra**	**Handel: Arias**
**1998** (12th)	Tamara Anna Cislowska	The Persian Hours
**1998** (12th)	Slava Grigoryan	Dance of the Angels
**1998** (12th)	Karin Schaupp	Leyenda
**1998** (12th)	Sydney Alpha Ensemble	Elena Kats-Chernin: Clocks
**1999** (13th)
**1999** (13th)	**Gerard Willems**	**Piano: Beethoven Sonatas Volume 1**
**1999** (13th)	Sara Macliver (soprano), Australian Brandenburg Orchestra, Paul Dyer	If Love's a Sweet Passion
**1999** (13th)	Tamara Anna Cislowska	Piano: The Russian Album
**1999** (13th)	Paul Dean (clarinet), Queensland Symphony Orchestra, Richard Mills	Ariel's Music
**1999** (13th)	Melbourne Symphony Orchestra, Vernon Handley	The Eternal Rhythm
**2000** (14th)
**2000** (14th)	**Gerard Willems**	**Beethoven: Complete Piano Sonatas**
**2000** (14th)	Rosamund Illing, Richard Bonynge, Australian Opera and Ballet Orchestra	Amoureuse: Sacred and Profane Arias
**2000** (14th)	Michael Kieran Harvey	Messiaen: Twenty Contemplations of the Infant Jesus
**2000** (14th)	Simon Tedeschi	Simon Tedeschi
**2000** (14th)	Richard Tognetti, Australian Chamber Orchestra	Beethoven Violin Concerto & Mozart Symphony No. 40
**2001** (15th)
**2001** (15th)	**Genevieve Lacey, Brandenburg Orchestra, Paul Dyer**	**Vivaldi - Ii Flauto Dolce**
**2001** (15th)	Macquarie Trio	Schubert: Complete Piano Trios
**2001** (15th)	Shu Cheen Yu	Lotus Moon
**2001** (15th)	Stephanie McCallum	Perfume
**2001** (15th)	Woof!	Tuneful Percussion
**2002** (16th)
**2002** (16th)	**Slava Grigoryan**	**Sonatas & Fantasies**
**2002** (16th)	David Hobson	Handel: Arias
**2002** (16th)	Genevieve Lacey, Linda Kent	Piracy
**2002** (16th)	Geoffrey Lancaster	Haydn: Keyboard Sonatas Volume 1
**2002** (16th)	Yvonne Kenny, Adelaide Symphony Orchestra	Gorecki: Symphony No. 3
**2003** (17th)
**2003** (17th)	**Saffire**	**Saffire - The Australian Guitar Quartet**
**2003** (17th)	Marshall McGuire	The 20th Century Harp
**2003** (17th)	Slava Grigoryan, Leonard Grigoryan	Play
**2003** (17th)	Teddy Tahu Rhodes	Mozart Arias
**2003** (17th)	Yvonne Kenny	Make Believe
**2004** (18th)
**2004** (18th)	**Teddy Tahu Rhodes**	**The Voice**
**2004** (18th)	Diana Doherty	Souvenirs
**2004** (18th)	Sara Macliver, Sally-Anne Russell	Bach Arias and Duets
**2004** (18th)	William Barton, The Queensland Orchestra	Sculthorpe: Songs of Sea and Sky
**2004** (18th)	Gerard Willems, Sinfonia Australis	Beethoven Complete Piano Concertos
**2005** (19th)
**2005** (19th)	**Australian Brandenburg Orchestra**	**Sanctuary**
**2005** (19th)	Elena Kats-Chernin	Wild Swans
**2005** (19th)	Michael Kieran Harvey	Rabid Bay
**2005** (19th)	Sara Macliver & Sally-Anne Russell	Baroque Duets
**2005** (19th)	Slava Grigoryan	Afterimage
**2006** (20th)
**2006** (20th)	**Richard Tognetti**	**Bach Sonatas and Partitas for Solo Violin**
**2006** (20th)	Amelia Farrugia	Joie De Vivre
**2006** (20th)	Niki Vasilakis, Tasmanian Symphony Orchestra, Sebastian Lang-Lessing	Mendelssohn, Bruch, Ravel
**2006** (20th)	Simon Tedeschi, The Queensland Orchestra, Richard Bonynge	Piano Concertos: Tchaikovsky, Grieg
**2006** (20th)	Slava Grigoryan, Leonard Grigoryan, The Queensland Orchestra, Brett Kelly	Rodrigo Guitar Concertos
**2007** (21st)
**2007** (21st)	**Richard Tognetti, Australian Chamber Orchestra**	**Bach Violin Concertos**
**2007** (21st)	Accademia Arcadia	Trio Sonatas
**2007** (21st)	Adelaide Symphony Orchestra, Arvo Volmer	Sculthorpe Requiem and Orchestral Works
**2007** (21st)	Michael Kieran Harvey	Carl Vine Piano Music 1990-2006
**2007** (21st)	Slava Grigoryan, Leonard Grigoryan	Impressions
**2007** (21st)	State Opera of South Australia, Adelaide Symphony Orchestra, Asher Fisch	Wagner: Das Rheingold
**2008** (22nd)
**2008** (22nd)	**Richard Tognetti, Neal Peres Da Costa, Daniel Yeadon**	**Bach Sonatas for Violin & Keyboard**
**2008** (22nd)	Brett Dean, Sydney Symphony	Brett Dean
**2008** (22nd)	Elena Kats-Chernin	Slow Food
**2008** (22nd)	Roger Woodward	Johann Sebastian Bach: Chromatic Fantasia & Fugue, Partita no. 2 & Partita no. 6
**2008** (22nd)	Slava Grigoryan, Tasmanian Symphony Orchestra, Benjamin Northey	Baroque Guitar Concertos
**2009** (23rd)
**2009** (23rd)	**Australian Brandenburg Orchestra, Paul Dyer**	**Handel: Concerti Grossi Opus 6**
**2009** (23rd)	Australian Chamber Orchestra	Classical Destinations II
**2009** (23rd)	Emma Matthews	Emma Matthews in Monte Carlo
**2009** (23rd)	Slava & Leonard Grigoryan	Distance
**2009** (23rd)	Teddy Tahu Rhodes, David Hobson	You'll Never Walk Alone
**2009** (23rd)	Goldner String Quartet	Beethoven: The Complete String Quartets
**2010** (24th)
**2010** (24th)	**Australian Brandenburg Orchestra & Paul Dyer**	**Tapas - Tastes of the Baroque**
**2010** (24th)	Aleksandr Tsiboulski	Australian Guitar Music
**2010** (24th)	Li-Wei Qin	Beethoven Cello Sonatas
**2010** (24th)	David Hobson	Enchanted Way
**2010** (24th)	Geoffrey Lancaster	Haydn: Complete Keyboard Sonatas, Vol. 1
**2010** (24th)	Richard Tognetti, Christopher Moore & Australian Chamber Orchestra	Mozart Violin Concertos
**2010** (24th)	Teddy Tahu Rhodes	Bach Arias
**2011** (25th)
**2011** (25th)	**Sally Whitwell**	**Mad Rush: Piano Music of Philip Glass**
**2011** (25th)	Karin Schaupp & Flinders Quartet	Fandango
**2011** (25th)	Latitude 37	Latitude 37
**2011** (25th)	Richard Tognetti (violin), Australian Chamber Orchestra	Mozart Violin Concertos Vol 2
**2011** (25th)	Teddy Tahu Rhodes	Serious Songs
**2012** (26th)
**2012** (26th)	**William Barton**	**Kalkadungu**
**2012** (26th)	Jose Carbo with Slava and Leonard Grigoryan	My Latin Heart
**2012** (26th)	Orchestra of the Antipodes	Bach: Brandenburg Concertos
**2012** (26th)	Sally Whitwell	The Good, the Bad and the Awkward
**2012** (26th)	Sydney Symphony, Vladimir Ashkenazy	Elgar: The Dream of Gerontius
**2013** (27th)
**2013** (27th)	**Sally Whitwell**	**All Imperfect Things: Solo Piano Music of Michael Nyman**
**2013** (27th)	Amy Dickson, Melbourne Symphony Orchestra	Catch Me If You Can
**2013** (27th)	David Hansen	Rivals: Arias for Farinelli & Co.
**2013** (27th)	Jane Sheldon, Genevieve Lang & Acacia Quartet	North + South: Ten Folk Songs
**2013** (27th)	Nigel Westlake, Melbourne Symphony Orchestra	Missa Solis: Requiem for Eli
**2014** (28th)
**2014** (28th)	**Nigel Westlake, Lior and Sydney Symphony Orchestra**	**Compassion**
**2014** (28th)	Australian World Orchestra, Zubin Mehta	Stravinsky Rite of Spring / Mahler Symphony No. 1
**2014** (28th)	Emma Matthews, Tasmanian Symphony Orchestra, Marko Letonja	Mozart Arias
**2014** (28th)	Joe Chindamo & Zoë Black	Dido's Lament
**2014** (28th)	Latitude 37	Empires
**2014** (28th)	Andrew Macleod, Melbourne Symphony Orchestra, Benjamin Northey, Markus Stenz	Ades Polaris / Stanhope Piccolo Concerto
**2014** (28th)	Topology	Share House
**2015** (29th)
**2015** (29th)	**Tamara-Anna Cislowska**	**Peter Sculthorpe: Complete Works for Solo Piano**
**2015** (29th)	Amy Dickson	Island Songs
**2015** (29th)	Australian Brandenburg Orchestra	Brandenburg Celebrates
**2015** (29th)	Grigoryan Brothers	This Time
**2015** (29th)	Sally Whitwell	I Was Flying
**2016** (30th)
**2016** (30th)	**Flight Facilities**	**Live with the Melbourne Symphony Orchestra**
**2016** (30th)	Joe Chindamo & Zoë Black	The New Goldberg Variations
**2016** (30th)	Katie Noonan & Brodsky Quartet	With Love and Fury
**2016** (30th)	Nicole Car, Australian Opera, Australian Ballet Orchestra and Andrea Molino	This Kiss
**2016** (30th)	Richard Tognetti & Australian Chamber Orchestra	Mozart's Last Symphonies
**2017** (31st)
**2017** (31st)	**Slava Grigoryan**	**Bach: Cello Suites Volume I**
**2017** (31st)	Grigoryan Brothers	Songs Without Words
**2017** (31st)	Jayson Gillham, Melbourne Symphony Orchestra & Benjamin Northey	Medtner: Piano Concerto No 1 / Rachmaninoff: Piano Concerto No 2
**2017** (31st)	Kate Miller-Heidke & Sydney Symphony Orchestra	Live at the Sydney Opera House
**2017** (31st)	Tamara-Anna Cislowska	Elena Kats-Chernin: Unsent Love Letters - Meditations on Erik Satie
**2018** (32nd)
**2018** (32nd)	**Slava Grigoryan**	**Bach: Cello Suites Volume II**
**2018** (32nd)	Greta Bradman, Adelaide Symphony Orchestra, Adelaide Chamber Singers & Luke Dollman	Home
**2018** (32nd)	Ray Chen	The Golden Age
**2018** (32nd)	Sally Whitwell	Philip Glass: Complete Etudes for Solo Piano
**2018** (32nd)	Tamara Anna Cislowska, Tasmanian Symphony Orchestra & Johannes Fritzsch	Into Silence: Part|Vasks|Gorecki|Pelecis
**2019** (33rd)
**2019** (33rd)	**Paul Kelly, James Ledger**	**Thirteen Ways to Look at Birds**
**2019** (33rd)	Diana Doherty, Sydney Symphony Orchestra, Nigel Westlake, David Robertson, Synergy Vocals	Nigel Westlake: Spirit of the Wild / Steve Reich: The Desert Music
**2019** (33rd)	Genevieve Lacey	Soliloquy: Telemann Solo Fantasias
**2019** (33rd)	Grigoryan Brothers, Adelaide Symphony Orchestra, Benjamin Northey	Bach Concertos
**2019** (33rd)	Nicole Car, Australian Chamber Orchestra, Richard Tognetti	Heroines
**2020** (34th)
**2020** (34th)	**Richard Tognetti** & **Erin Helyard**	**Beethoven & Mozart Violin Sonatas**
**2020** (34th)	Alicia Crossley & Acacia Quartet	Muse
**2020** (34th)	David Greco & Erin Helyard	Schubert: Die schöne Müllerin
**2020** (34th)	Jayson Gillham, Adelaide Symphony Orchestra, Nicholas Carter	Beethoven Piano Concertos
**2020** (34th)	Slava & Sharon Grigoryan	Our Place: Duets For Cello And Guitar
**2021** (35th)
**2021** (35th)	**Genevieve Lacey** & **Marshall McGuire**	**Bower**
**2021** (35th)	Christian Li	Vivaldi: The Four Seasons
**2021** (35th)	Emily Sun & Andrea Lam	Nocturnes
**2021** (35th)	Grigoryan Brothers	This Is Us (A Musical Reflection of Australia)
**2021** (35th)	Nat Bartsch	Hope
**2022** (36th)
**2022** (36th)	**Melbourne Symphony Orchestra & Sir Andrew Davis**	**The Enchanted Loom: Orchestral Works by Carl Vine**
**2022** (36th)	Amy Dickson, Colin Currie, Lothar Koenigs, Yvonne Kenny, David Zinman, Sydney Symphony Orchestra, Markus Stenz & Melbourne Symphony Orchestra	Ross Edwards: Frog and Star Cycle / Symphonies 2 & 3
**2022** (36th)	Lachlan Skipworth	Chamber Works, Vol. 2
**2022** (36th)	Luke Howard	All of Us
**2022** (36th)	Tamara Anna Cislowska and Guests	Duet
**2023** (37th)
**2023** (37th)	**Australian Chamber Orchestra and Richard Tognetti**	**Indies & Idols**
**2023** (37th)	Ensemble Offspring	To Listen, To Sing - Ngarra-Burria: First Peoples Composers
**2023** (37th)	Neil Gaiman and FourPlay String Quartet	Signs Of Life
**2023** (37th)	Roger Benedict and Simon Tedeschi	Dubussy - Ravel
**2023** (37th)	Genevieve Lacey and Various Artists	Genevieve Lacey: Breathing Space
**2024** (38th)
**2024** (38th)	**Sophie Hutchings**	**A World Outside**
**2024** (38th)	Australian Chamber Orchestra and Richard Tognetti	Beethoven Symphonies 1, 2 & 3 'Eroica'
**2024** (38th)	Grigoryan Brothers	Amistad - Music for Two Guitars
**2024** (38th)	Orava Quartet	ORAWA
**2024** (38th)	Veronique Serret	Migrating Bird
**2025** (39th)
**2025** (39th)	**Andrea Lam**	**Piano Diary**
**2025** (39th)	Australian Chamber Orchestra and Richard Tognetti	Tchaikovsky: Serenade for Strings and Adante Cantabile / Shostakovich: Chamber Symphony in C Minor
**2025** (39th)	Nat Bartsch	Forever Changed
**2025** (39th)	Simone Young and Sydney Symphony Orchestra	Mahler: Symphony No. 2 / Barton: Of the Earth
**2025** (39th)	Sophie Hutchings	Become the Sky
**2026** (40th)
**2026** (40th)	**William Barton and Omega Ensemble**	**Gift – Our Breath of Life**
**2026** (40th)	Jayson Gillham	Chopin Etudes
**2026** (40th)	Richard Tognetti and Australian Chamber Orchestra	Beethoven & Brahms Concertos for Violin and Orchestra
**2026** (40th)	Simone Young and Sydney Symphony Orchestra	Mahler: Symphony No. 3
**2026** (40th)	Tamara-Anna Cislowska, Tasmanian Symphony Orchestra & Johannes Fritzsch	Elena Kats-Chernin: Ancient Letters
