= Latitude 37 =

- Origin: Melbourne, Victoria, Australia
- Genres: Baroque
- Years active: 2009–present
- Label: ABC Classics
- Members: Julia Fredersdorff; Laura Vaughan; Donald Nicolson

Latitude 37 are an Australian baroque trio. They play music from the 1600s and 1700s, using instruments from that era.

Latitude 37's albums Latitude 37 and Empires received nominations for the 2011 and 2014 ARIA Award for Best Classical Album.

== Members ==
- Julia Fredersdorff - baroque violin
- Laura Vaughan - viol and lirone
- Donald Nicolson - harpsichord and organ

== Discography ==
=== Albums ===
List of albums, with selected details
Title	Details
Latitude 37	Released: July 2011; Format: CD, Digital; Label: ABC Classics
Empires	Released: 2013; Format: CD, Digital; Label: ABC Classics
Royal Consorts - Music for English Kings	Released: October 2015; Format: CD, Digital; Label: ABC Classics
X	Released: August 2019; Format: CD, Digital; Label: Latitude 37, ABC Classics

== Awards and nominations ==
=== ARIA Music Awards ===
The ARIA Music Awards is an annual awards ceremony that recognises excellence, innovation, and achievement across all genres of Australian music. They commenced in 1987.

Year	Nominee / work	Award	Result	Ref.
2011	Latitude 37	Best Classical Album	Nominated	
2014	Empires	Best Classical Album	Nominated	
