= Paul Dyer (conductor) =

Paul William Dyer AO is an Australian musician, conductor and artistic director. He is the artistic director and co-founder of the Australian Brandenburg Orchestra and the Brandenburg Choir. He has played an important role in developing historically informed performance practice of Baroque and early music in Australia.

== Career ==
Dyer studied piano and harpsichord at the Sydney Conservatorium of Music and pursued postgraduate studies with Bob van Asperen at the Royal Conservatory in The Hague.

In 1995, he received a Churchill Fellowship to pursue advanced studies in 17th and 18th Century music performance practices in the UK, Netherlands, and France.

== Awards and nominations ==
=== ARIA Music Awards ===
The ARIA Music Awards is an annual awards ceremony that recognises excellence, innovation, and achievement across all genres of Australian music.

Year	Nominee / work	Award	Result
1995	Handel: Opera Arias (with Australian Brandenburg Orchestra and Graham Pushee)	Best Classical Album	Nominated
1998	Handel: Arias (with Australian Brandenburg Orchestra and Yvonne Kenny)	Best Classical Album	Won
1999	If Love's a Sweet Passion (with Australian Brandenburg Orchestra and Sara Macliver)	Best Classical Album	Nominated
2001	Il Flauto Dolce (with Australian Brandenburg Orchestra and Genevieve Lacey)	Best Classical Album	Won
2009	Handel: Concerti Grossi Opus 6 (with Australian Brandenburg Orchestra)	Best Classical Album	Won
2010	Tapas - Tastes of the Baroque (with Australian Brandenburg Orchestra)	Best Classical Album	Won

== Honours ==
In 2001 he was awarded the Centenary Medal "for service to Australian society and the advancement of music".

In 2013 he was appointed an Officer of the Order of Australia "for distinguished service to the performing arts, particularly orchestral music as a director, conductor and musician, through the promotion of educational programs and support for emerging artists".

Dyer is also Patron of St Gabriel's School for Hearing Impaired Children.
