= Christina's World (opera) =

Operetta by Ross Edwards, libretto by Dorothy Hewett

- Opera by Ross Edwards
- Librettist: Dorothy Hewett
- Based on: painting by Andrew Wyeth
- Premiere: 9 October 1987; Sydney

Christina's World is a 1983 Australian operetta, composed by Ross Edwards with libretto by playwright Dorothy Hewett. An old woman recalls her youthful memories of her family and her tragic love affair on a lonely Western Australian beach. Hewett describes the piece as "an allegory or fable about illusion or reality and the truth and lies of memory".

== Characters ==
- Christina (old) : an elderly lady in a hospital
- Christina (young) : a hesitant and idealistic dream figure; a contradictory, perverse, tragi-comic adolescent with a fierce egocentric life of her own.
- Dick : a numbed and disappointed father
- Harry : uncle deranged by World War I experiences
- Tom : a playful and carefree fisherman

== Synopsis ==
Elderly Christina reflects on (or imagines) her youth living with her father and uncle in a decaying house on a remote but beautiful beach. Her memory of her young self begins as a fantasy but soon takes on real life. Christina's father Dick is numbed and disappointed by the loss of her mother, who committed suicide by walking into the sea. Her uncle Harry is deranged by his experiences in World War I. Christina falls in love with a playful young man whose brief lovemaking leaves her with a baby whom she casts adrift in a small boat into the waves. Tom is shot by Uncle Harry (possibly accidentally), who then burns down the house. Was there ever such a place as Christina's World? The opera ends with the voice of the ageing Christina still telling her tragic story of lost love and perfect world.

== Staging ==
An old woman in hospital, with curtained bed and bedpan; a burnt-out farmhouse on a beach with sand and shells; recorded seagull cries, wind, surf and a ship's buoy.

== Music ==
The collaboration was conceived and fostered by Stuart Challender, and it was commissioned by the Music and Literature Boards of the Australia Council. Hewett listened to tapes of Edwards' music, wrote the libretto and sent it to Edwards, who completed the opera. It is Edwards' only opera.

According to Roger Covell, the music is tuneful and appealingly modal, with a fresh luminous note. Spoken words are prominent at the beginning, but diminish until the piece becomes an extended ballad.

== Premiere ==
The first staging was part of a triple bill at the Seymour Centre, performed by the Seymour Company. on 24 and 26 November 1983. The cast was Patricia Price, Paul Ferris, Gregory Yurisich and Meg Chilcott.

== Subsequent performances ==
The opera was due to be performed in the National Opera Workshop in October 1989. However, after a week's rehearsal, the director of the Workshop, Peter King, was sacked in late September after a fortnight of rehearsals as he was ”jeopardising the career of his young singers by being too innovative, too radical." This was despite sponsorship by Shell, and a substantial outlay by the company. An ABC broadcast of the play was due to go ahead on 14 October 1989 with a CD release to follow.

The ABC also broadcast a performance in 1992, conducted by Mark Summerbell.

The Sydney Metropolitan Opera performed the opera at the Wharf Theatre Studio in May 1994, directed by John Wregg and musical director Roland Peelman, with performers Gaye McFarland as Christina, Linda Barcan as young Christina, Garrick Jones as Dick, James Bonnefin as Harry and Christopher Saunders as Tom. Critical reception was sharply divided. On the one hand, Roger Covell saw a "clean, brisk and tender performance" that is "charming, childlike and poetic." On the other hand, John Carmody praised the direction of Wregg, but found the opera to be "undisciplined, aimless and frankly undramatic" with no creative sparks. He hoped it would "rot away like sodden crap."

The State Opera of South Australia performed the opera at the Queens Theatre on 2 August 2019, with Nicholas Cannon directing.

== Publication ==
The score is held at the Australian Music Centre.
