= Nat Bartsch =

Australian pianist and composer

Nat Bartsch is a pianist and composer based in Melbourne, Australia who creates lyrical, meditative work that explores the space between classical and jazz genres.

Bartsch has been diagnosed with autism and ADHD, and is an advocate of neurodiversity in music.

== Career ==
=== Early years ===
She began classical piano lessons from the age of 4, and following high school she completed a Diploma of Music Performance at Box Hill Institute, where she began to discover the world of jazz and contemporary playing. Bartsch grew up listening to Radiohead, Sigur Ros and Elbow. later discovering artists like Tord Gustavsen, Nik Bärtsch, Marcin Wasilewski Trio and Arvo Pärt. In 2006 Bartsch completed a Bachelor of Music Performance (improvisation) at the Victorian College of the Arts. Upon graduation she was awarded the inaugural Lionel Gell Foundation Travelling Scholarship.

=== 2010-2013: Nat Bartsch Trio ===
Bartsch's career began as bandleader/composer for the jazz ensemble Nat Bartsch Trio, influenced by Scandinavian and Australian jazz, and studies with Tord Gustavsen and Nik Bärtsch. They released their Springs, for all the Winters album on Rufus/ABC Jazz in 2010, and To Sail, To Sing independently in 2013. Her trio toured Japan twice, and performed in Europe supporting Abdullah Ibrahim's Ekaya in 2013.

=== 2014-present: Solo career ===
In 2014 Bartsch shifted away from jazz and focused on the creation of solo piano and chamber music works, drawing more upon neoclassical and neo-romantic influences. A developing friendship/collaboration with fellow pianist Luke Howard led to the creation of her debut solo album Hometime in 2017.

Bartsch has become most well known for her lullabies, which, during early motherhood, saw her translate her gentle aesthetic into music with purpose. She created a suite of pieces designed to soothe babies to sleep (influenced by music therapy), but that would also be meaningfully enjoyable for adults. The resulting album, Forever, and No Time At All was released in 2018 on ABC Classic, with a jazz sextet re-interpretation, Forever More, released in 2020.

In 2021 she released her fourth solo album Hope. Bartsch said the title "abbreviates both hopefulness and hopelessness".

Bartsch has composed chamber music commissions for Plexus Collective, Solstice Trio, Matt Withers/Sally Whitwell and The Muses Trio. She was the recipient of the 2020 Catherine Mary Sullivan scholarship, 2020 Classical:NEXT Artistic Associate Fellowship, 2019 Johnny Dennis Music Award, 2010 Melbourne Prize for Music Development Award and the 2007 Lionel Gell Travelling Fellowship. She has also performed with artists in many contemporary genres as a pianist/keyboardist, including Whitaker, Thando, Timothy Coghill, Sweet Jean, Matt Corby and Circus Oz. At the 2023 Art Music Awards he won Work of the Year: Jazz for Busy/Quiet, which was performed by his quartet and Ellen Kirkwood and Loretta Palmeiro.

In 2025, Bartsch's Brightness in the Hills and Forever, and No Time At All were voted nos. 79 and 84 respectively in ABC Classic's Classic 100: Piano Countdown. The former piece was the newest work included in the countdown. Bartsch performed the piece with the Melbourne Symphony Orchestra at the Classic 100 in Concert, which was simultaneously broadcast on ABC TV and ABC Classic radio.

== Discography ==
=== Albums ===
List of albums, with selected details
| Title | Details |
|---|---|
| Springs, For All the Winters (as Nat Bartsch Trio) | Released: 2010; Format: CD, Digital; Label: Rufus Records (RF110) |
| To Sing, To Sail (as Nat Bartsch Trio) | Released: May 2013; Format: CD, Digital; Label: Rufus Records (RF110) |
| Home Time | Released: 2017; Format: CD, Digital; Label: Nat Bartsch (NBT002) |
| Forever and No Time At All | Released: May 2018; Format: CD, Digital; Label: Nat Bartsch |
| Forever More | Released: July 2020; Format: CD, Digital; Label: ABC Music (088 8458) |
| Hope | Released: May 2021; Format: CD, Digital; Label: ABC Music (4855760) |
| Hope Renewed | Released: March 2023; Format: Digital; Label: Amica |
| Forever Changed | Released: November 2024; Format: Digital; Label: Amica |

== Awards and nominations ==
=== AIR Awards ===
The Australian Independent Record Awards (commonly known informally as AIR Awards) is an annual awards night to recognise, promote and celebrate the success of Australia's Independent Music sector.

| Year | Nominee / work | Award | Result | Ref. |
|---|---|---|---|---|
| 2022 | Hope | Best Independent Classical Album or EP | Nominated | |
| 2025 | Forever Changed | Best Independent Classical Album or EP | Nominated | |

=== ARIA Awards ===
The ARIA Music Awards are presented annually since 1987 by the Australian Recording Industry Association (ARIA).

| Year | Nominee / work | Award | Result | Ref. |
|---|---|---|---|---|
| 2020 | Forever More | Best Jazz Album | Nominated | |
| 2021 | Hope | Best Classical Album | Nominated | |
| 2025 | Forever Changed | Best Classical Album | Nominated | |

=== Music Victoria Awards ===
The Music Victoria Awards are an annual awards night celebrating Victorian music. They commenced in 2006.

| Year | Nominee / work | Award | Result | Ref. |
|---|---|---|---|---|
| 2021 | Nat Bartsch | Arts Access Amplify Award (for Deaf and Disabled acts) | Nominated | |
| 2022 | Nat Bartsch | Arts Access Amplify Award | Nominated | |
| 2023 | Nat Bartsch | Best Jazz Work | Nominated | |
