= ABC Music =

Australian independent record label

- Parent company: Australian Broadcasting Corporation
- Founded: 1974; 52 years ago
- Distributor: The Orchard
- Genre: Various
- Country of origin: Australia
- Location: Sydney
- Official website: www.abc.net.au/abcmusic/

ABC Music is an Australian independent record label. It operates under the ABC Commercial division of the Australian Broadcasting Corporation. It covers a wide range of music genres, including classical, children's and adult contemporary music, blues, roots, rock, and Australian country music. Its imprints include ABC Classics and FOUR FOUR.

ABC Music Publishing was a separate business unit of ABC music, which published the work of composers and songwriters, until its catalogue was acquired by Universal Music Publishing Group Australia & NZ in 2020/21.

Established in 1974, ABC Music is one of the longest-running and diverse independent record labels. Operating as part of the ABC Commercial division, ABC Music invests all profits back into the broader ABC, with the intention to create content and to further its ABC Charter activities.

== Catalogue ==
ABC Music is an independent record label in Australia. Its catalogue covers a wide variety of genres including country, classical, blues, roots, and rock.

The label has released many albums in conjunction with various ABC Radio stations and programs, including triple j's Hottest 100, Like A Version, House Party, One Night Stand, Beat The Drum and 40 Years Of Music releases, as well as tribute albums to Nick Cave and Paul Kelly. It is also home to a number of popular compilation series, including Countdown, rage, Hit Country, Beaut Ute and ABC Kids themed titles, and has produced a number of special event releases, such as His Life and Music, the live album from Gurrumul featuring the Sydney Symphony Orchestra.

== Imprints ==
ABC Music acts as the umbrella label for several imprints, past and present, while FOUR FOUR covers genres such as reggae, ska, roots, world music and rock.

=== ABC Classic ===
ABC Classic
- Genre: Classical
- Founded: 1987
- Parent: ABC Music
- Divisions: Australian Composers Series with the Tasmanian Symphony Orchestra

ABC Classic is an imprint of ABC Music, which represents many of Australia's leading classical musicians, orchestras and ensembles. The label was founded in 1987 as a means of showcasing the ABC's classical music recordings under its own banner. The label sells music on CD as well as making it available on various music streaming services such as Spotify.

ABC Classic has been awarded the prestigious ARIA Music Award for Best Classical Album more than 25 times since the inception of the awards in 1987.

Featured artists include Yvonne Kenny, Geoffrey Lancaster, Jayson Gillham, Richard Tognetti, Sara Macliver, Teddy Tahu Rhodes, Slava Grigoryan, Gareth Koch, David Hobson, Karin Schaupp, Diana Doherty, Roger Woodward, Gerard Willems, Omega Ensemble, Cantillation, Sydney Children's Choir, Gondwana Voices and Saffire (the Australian Guitar Quartet). The label has a strong emphasis on Australian compositions, with their Australian Composers Series recorded in conjunction with the Tasmanian Symphony Orchestra being a major milestone in Australian Music.

=== FOUR FOUR ===
Four Four
- Parent company: ABC Music
- Founded: 2012
- Status: Active
- Distributor: The Orchard
- Genre: Rock, ska, punk, etc.
- Location: Sydney
- Official website: fourfourmusic.com

Four Four (stylised as FOUR || FOUR) is an imprint of ABC Music. Established in 2012, Four Four's releases include genres such as reggae, ska, roots, world music, blues, folk, alternative rock, punk, indie and Australian rock.

One of their earliest signings was the ARIA Award-winning band Melbourne Ska Orchestra, in November 2012.

As of June 2021, the following artists were signed to Four Four:

- Nicky Bomba
- Born Lion
- Cambodian Space Project
- Damien Dempsey
- The Go Set
- Little Bastard
- Melbourne Ska Orchestra
- Paddy McHugh
- Mutiny
- Ozomatli
- Tim Rogers
- The Rumjacks
- Screamfeeder
- The Snowdroppers
- The Tiger & Me

== Awards ==
As of 2022, ABC Music releases have received 119 ARIA Music Awards in a wide range of categories, since the awards' inception in 1987.

Music by Australian composers features prominently in the list winners, including Peter Sculthorpe, Richard Meale, Carl Vine and Ross Edwards. Australian orchestras have also dominated the awards, with the Sydney Symphony Orchestra featuring on four award winners. Soprano Yvonne Kenny and pianist Gerard Willems have both won the award twice.

The label has enjoyed great success in recent years, including ARIA Chart Number One albums from Lee Kernaghan and Triple J's Like a Version.

ABC Music was named "Best Independent Label" at the 2020 AIR Awards

== ABC Music Publishing ==
ABC Music Publishing is as of June 2021 still registered as a business name under ABC Commercial, but its website is no longer in existence, after its catalogue had been sold to Universal Music Publishing Group Australia & NZ. (Note: This information was supplied by private message from the official Facebook ABC Music page. Awaiting better citation.) It was "an independent music publisher representing some of Australia's most recognised songwriters and composers", including screen composers. It also provided a personalised service for filmmakers, providing licences for appropriate music for their films.

It represented some of Australia's most recognised songwriters and composers, including You Am I, Ruby Boots, Ben Salter, The Audreys, Sean O'Boyle, Juice Music, Tim Rogers, Davey Lane, Kit Warhurst, Amanda Brown, Rosie Westbrook, Sara Storer, Andy Clockwise, Sinead Burgess, Lachlan Bryan, and Rhys Muldoon.

Marianna Annas was Head of ABC Music Publishing until January 2020, before moving to take up the position of Vice President, Commercial & Creative at Universal Music Publishing Group Australia & NZ, based in Sydney.

== ABC Audio ==
ABC Audio is a leading producer of audiobooks and other spoken word releases, receiving distribution from Bolinda Audio Publishing.
