= Amy Dickson =

Australian classical saxophone player

Amy Dickson (born 1982) is an Australian classical saxophone player.

== Early life ==
Dickson was born in Sydney. She began to play piano at the age of two, and saxophone at the age of six. She initially played 'some jazz' in her youth, but eventually focused her saxophone training entirely on the classical repertoire. She made her concerto debut at age 16, playing the Concerto pour Saxophone Alto by Pierre Max Dubois, with Henryk Pisarek and the Ku-ring-gai Philharmonic Orchestra. Dickson became a recipient of the James Fairfax Australian Young Artist of the Year. She subsequently moved to London, where she took the Jane Melber Scholarship to study at the Royal College of Music with Kyle Horch. She also has studied at the Conservatorium van Amsterdam with Arno Bornkamp. During this time, she became the first saxophonist to win the Gold Medal at the Royal Overseas League Competition, the ABC Symphony Australia Young Performers Awards, and the Prince's Prize. Amy's UK studies were supported by a grant from the Tait Memorial Trust.

== Career ==
In 2005 and 2011, Dickson performed for the Commonwealth Heads of Government Meetings at the Teatru Manoel in Valletta, Malta, and the Perth Concert Hall, Australia. She has also performed at the Scottish Parliament in Edinburgh, St James' Palace in London and for former Australian Prime Minister John Howard at Parliament House, Canberra. In October 2013, Dickson won the Breakthrough Artist of the Year at the Classic Brits awards, the first saxophonist to be so honoured.

Dickson has commissioned new works from such composers as Brett Dean, Ross Edwards (composer), Peter Sculthorpe, Graham Fitkin, Steve Martland, Huw Watkins and Matthew Hindson. She has also arranged concertante works by Philip Glass and John Tavener, originally composed for other solo instruments, for saxophone. Now resident in London, she is an ambassador of the Australian Children's Music Foundation and of The Prince's Foundation for Children and the Arts.

== Discography ==
=== Albums ===
List of albums, with selected details
| Title | Details |
|---|---|
| Smile | Released: May 2008; Format: CD, Digital; Label: Sony Music Australia |
| Glass, Tavener, Nyman (with Mikel Toms & Royal Philharmonic Orchestra) | Released: August 2009; Format: CD, Digital; Label: Sony Music Australia |
| Catch Me If You Can (with Melbourne Symphony Orchestra) | Released: February 2013; Format: CD, Digital; Label: ABC Classics (4810118) |
| Dusk & Dawn | Released: April 2013; Format: CD, Digital; Label: Sony Classical (88725479572) |
| A Summer Place | Released: July 2014; Format: CD, Digital; Label: Sony Classical (8843040412) |
| Island Songs (with Sydney Symphony Orchestra) works by Peter Sculthorpe, Ross Edwards, Brett Dean | Released: May 2015; Format: CD, Digital; Label: ABC Classics (4811703) |
| Glass works by Philip Glass including Violin Concerto and Sonata | Released: January 2007; Format: CD, Digital; Label: Sony Classical (88985411942) |
| In Circles | Released: April 2019; Format: CD, Digital; Label: Sony Classical (19075944692) |
| Ross Edwards: Frog and Star Cycle / Symphonies 2 & 3 | Released: February 2022; Format: CD, Digital; Label: ABC Music |

== Awards and nominations ==
=== AIR Awards ===
The Australian Independent Record Awards (commonly known informally as AIR Awards) is an annual awards night to recognise, promote and celebrate the success of Australia's Independent Music sector.

| Year | Nominee / work | Award | Result |
|---|---|---|---|
| 2013 | Catch Me If You Can | Best Independent Classical Album | Won |
| 2015 | Island Songs | Best Independent Classical Album | Nominated |
| 2020 | In Circles | Best Independent Classical Album | Nominated |

=== ARIA Music Awards ===
The ARIA Music Awards is an annual awards ceremony that recognises excellence, innovation, and achievement across all genres of Australian music. They commenced in 1987.

| Year | Nominee / work | Award | Result | Ref. |
|---|---|---|---|---|
| 2013 | Catch Me If You Can (with Melbourne Symphony Orchestra) | Best Classical Album | Nominated | |
| 2015 | Island Songs (with Sydney Symphony Orchestra) | Best Classical Album | Nominated | |
| 2022 | Ross Edwards: Frog and Star Cycle / Symphonies 2 & 3 (with Colin Currie, Lothar Koenigs, Yvonne Kenny, David Zinman, Sydney Symphony Orchestra, Markus Stenz & Melbourne Symphony Orchestra) | Best Classical Album | Nominated | |

== External links section ==
- Official website of Amy Dickson
