= Tamara-Anna Cislowska =

Australian musician

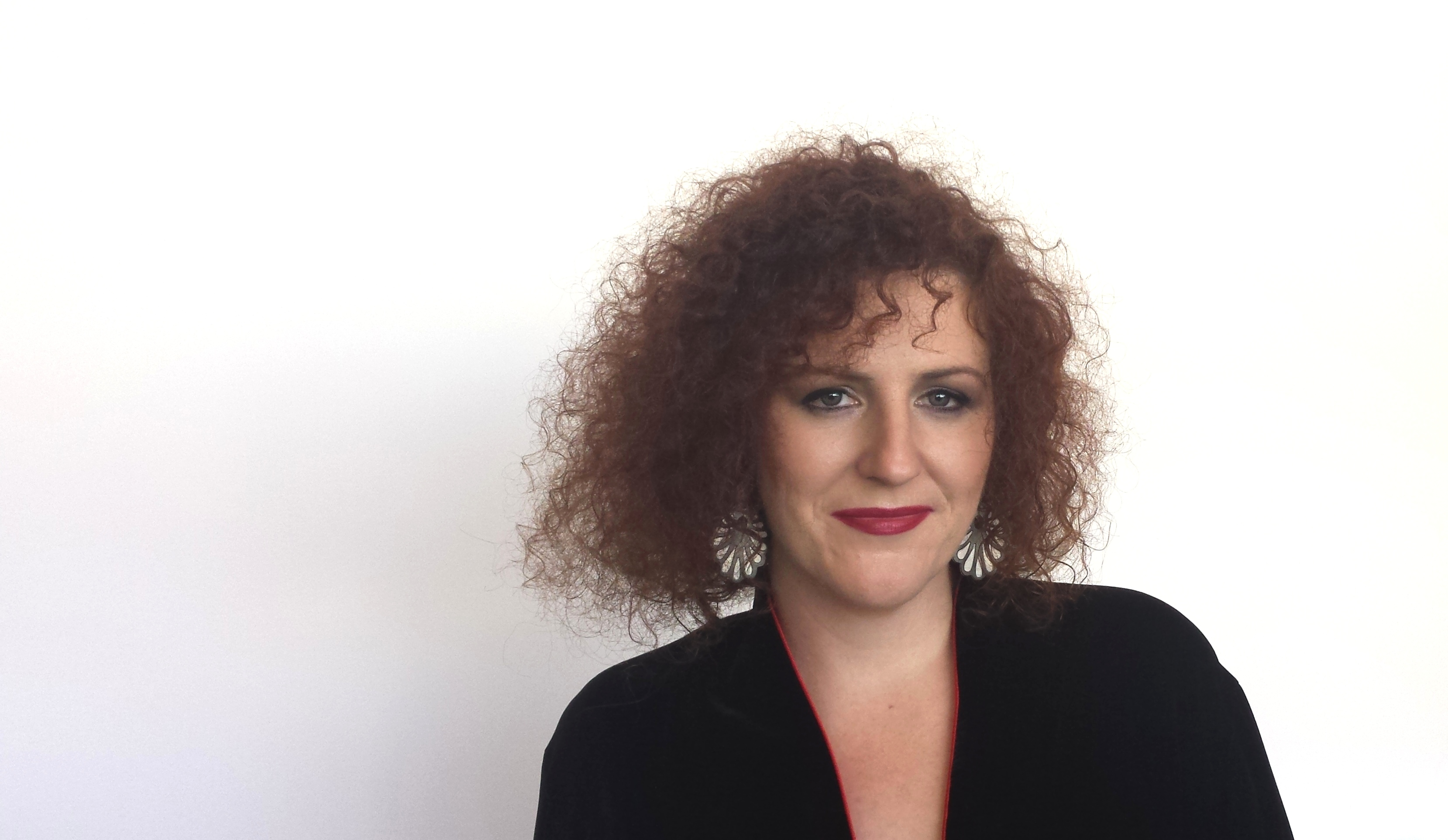
Cislowska in 2017

Tamara-Anna Cislowska is an Australian concert pianist. She has performed across many countries, including the United States, United Kingdom, South America, Italy, Japan, Germany, Switzerland, Greece, The Netherlands and Poland, and has played with the Philharmonia, the London Philharmonic Orchestra and Romanian Philharmonic orchestras as well as all six major Australian symphony orchestras.

== Career ==
Cislowska received her first piano lessons from her mother, Neta Maughan, a noted piano teacher from a long line of pianists and teachers. Cislowska emerged as a child prodigy, giving her first public performance at age two. She began recording material for ABC Radio at three years of age. One of her first mentors was Nancy Salas, and she later studied with Geoffrey Tozer. She won the most prizes of the McDonalds Sydney Performing Arts Challenge over three categories; instrumental, speech and drama, singing.

In 1991, at the age of 14, she won the ABC Symphony Australia Young Performers Awards, Australia's most prestigious classical music competition, becoming the youngest pianist to do so. A year later she was sent on a tour of Sydney's sister cities as a cultural ambassador, visiting Nagoya, Wellington and San Francisco. Cislowska was a founding member of the Australian Young Performers Trio, St Laurence Trio, Mozart Piano Quartet (Berlin) and Australia Piano Quartet.

Cislowska's recordings include five solo albums on the Artworks label, including The Enchanted Isle, The Persian Hours and The Russians. She has recorded for Naxos, Chandos, Dabringhaus and Grimm, ABC Classics, and Deutsche Grammophon. She has contributed to albums with the Sydney Symphony Orchestra, the New Zealand Symphony Orchestra and the London Philharmonic Orchestra.

As a recitalist she has performed at the Purcell Room in London, the Concert Hall of the Sydney Opera House, the Kleine Zaal of the Concertgebouw in Amsterdam and in New York at the Frick Collection and Carnegie Hall.

Since 2020, Cislowska has hosted the weekly radio program, Duet, on ABC Classic, described as an hour of music and conversation at the keyboard.

== Recognition and awards ==
She has received a number of awards and honours for her work and has been a major prizewinner at several international piano competitions, including the Rovere d'Oro, Maria Callas and National World Power.

She was the recipient of a David Paul Landa Memorial Scholarship for Pianists (sometime before 2004)

She is a Freedman Fellow. She has an APRA award for Best Performance ACT. Her work has received six nominations for ARIA awards for Best Classical Release.

At the ARIA Music Awards of 2015 Cislowska won Best Classical Album for Peter Sculthorpe: Complete Works for Solo Piano.

== Discography ==
List of albums, with Australian chart positions
Title	Album details	Peak chart positions
Title	Album details	AUS
The Enchanted Isle	Released: 1996; Format: CD; Label:	—
The Persian Hours	Released: 1998; Format: CD; Label: Artworks (AW010)	—
Piano: The Russian Album	Released: 2009; Format: CD; Label:	—
The Ghost Ship	Released: 2000; Format: CD; Label: Artworks (AWO020)	—
In Concert: Haydn – Mozart – Beethoven	Released: 2008; Format: CD; Label: 2MBS-FM (MBS42)	—
Bass Instinct (with Damian Whiteley)	Released: 2009; Format: CD; Label: Damian Whiteley (7357214)	—
Complete Works for Solo Piano (with Peter Sculthorpe)	Released: September 2014; Format: 2×CD, digital; Label: ABC Classics (481 1181)	—
Butterflying: Piano Music By Elena Kats-Chernin (with Elena Kats-Chernin)	Released: 2016; Format: CD, digital; Label: ABC Classics (481 2625)	—
Elena Kats-Chernin: Unsent Love Letters – Meditations on Erik Satie	Released: 2017; Format: CD, digital; Label: ABC Classics (481 4967)	91
Into Silence (with Tasmanian Symphony Orchestra)	Released: September 2017; Format: CD, digital; Label: ABC Classics (481 6295)	—
Vasks – Gorecki – Pelecis (with Tasmanian Symphony Orchestra and Johannes Fritzsch)	Released: 2018; Format: digital; Label:	—
Playing with Fire	Released: 2019; Format: CD, digital; Label: Wirripang ( Wirr 095)	—
One Summer's Day	Released: April 2021; Format: CD, digital; Label: ABC	—
Duet (with guests)	Released: November 2021; Format: CD, digital; Label: ABC	—
Duet 2 (with guests)	Released: September 2022; Format: CD, digital; Label: ABC	—
Elena Kats-Chernin: Ancient Letters (with Tasmanian Symphony Orchestra & Johannes Fritzsch)	Released: August 2025; Format: CD, digital; Label: ABC	—

== Awards and nominations ==
=== ARIA Music Awards ===
The ARIA Music Awards is an annual awards ceremony that recognises excellence, innovation, and achievement across all genres of Australian music. They commenced in 1987.

Year	Nominee / work	Award	Result	Ref.
1997	The Enchanted Isle	Best Classical Album	Nominated	
1998	The Persian Hours	Best Classical Album	Nominated	
1999	Piano: The Russian Album	Best Classical Album	Nominated	
2015	Peter Sculthorpe: Complete Works for Solo Piano	Best Classical Album	Won	
2017	Elena Kats-Chernin: Unsent Love Letters – Meditations on Erik Satie	Best Classical Album	Nominated	
2018	Into Silence: Part Vasks Gorecki Pelecis (with Tasmanian Symphony Orchestra and Johannes Fritzsch)	Best Classical Album	Nominated	
2022	Duet	Best Classical Album	Nominated	
2026	Elena Kats-Chernin: Ancient Letters (Tasmanian Symphony Orchestra & Johannes Fritzsch)	Best Classical Album	Nominated	
