= Yvonne Kenny =

Australian soprano (born 1950)

Yvonne Kenny AM
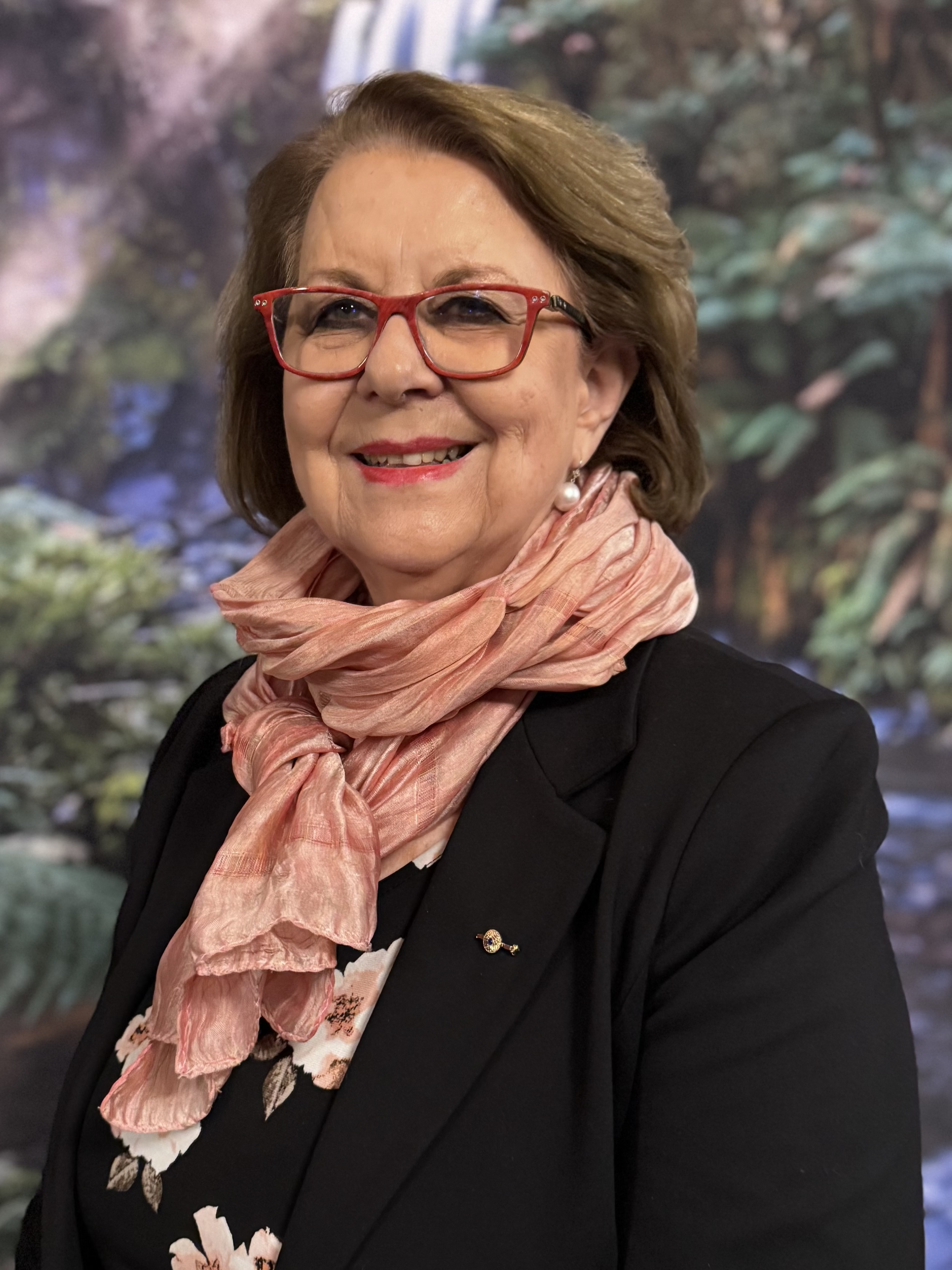
- Kenny at Australia House, 2025
- Born: Yvonne Denise Kenny; 25 November 1950 (age 75); Sydney, New South Wales, Australia
- Education: University of Sydney; Sydney Conservatorium of Music
- Occupation: Soprano

Yvonne Denise Kenny (born 25 November 1950) is an Australian soprano, particularly associated with Handel, Mozart and bel canto roles.

== Biography ==
Born in Sydney, Kenny first studied at the University of Sydney in science, hoping to become a biochemist, but decided to pursue a career in music instead. She studied first with Myra Lambert at the Sydney Conservatorium of Music, and later won a scholarship to study at the opera school at La Scala in Milan. After a year of studying there, she went to England, where after a few recitals and TV appearances, her breakthrough came on 11 October 1975, when she replaced, with only four days' notice, the soprano scheduled to sing in an Opera Rara concert performance of Donizetti's Rosmonda d'Inghilterra at the Queen Elizabeth Hall. It was a triumph and the virtually unknown Kenny became an overnight star.

She made her debut at the Royal Opera House the following year, in the premiere of Hans Werner Henze's We Come to the River, later singing in Handel operas such as Semele, Alcina, Giulio Cesare, and such Mozart operas as: Idomeneo, Mitridate, re di Ponto, La clemenza di Tito, The Abduction from the Seraglio, The Magic Flute. She also sang Sophie in both Werther and Der Rosenkavalier. She was also a regular guest at the Glyndebourne Festival and the English National Opera. On the international scene, she appeared at opera houses in Zurich, Munich, Vienna, Aix-en-Provence, Washington, etc. She often returned home, appearing at the Sydney Opera House in roles including: Mélisande, Manon, Leila, Micaela, Fiordiligi, Pamina, Alcina and Cleopatra. Later she sang the roles of Richard Strauss.

She performed the Olympic Hymn at the closing ceremony of the 2000 Summer Olympics in Sydney. In 2001 she was awarded the Centenary Medal.

In 2009, Kenny appeared as Blanche DuBois in the Australian premiere of André Previn's adaptation of A Streetcar Named Desire for Opera Australia. After her initial success with Opera Rara, she appeared in many recordings with them, notably Donizetti's Ugo, conte di Parigi and Emilia di Liverpool, Meyerbeer's Il crociato in Egitto, and Simon Mayr's Medea in Corinto. She also provided the voice for the title role in the TV mini-series Melba, about Dame Nellie Melba.

She is the chairman and life president of the Australian Music Foundation.

== Discography ==
=== Albums ===
List of albums, with selected chart positions
Title	Album details	Peak chart positions
Title	Album details	AUS
Recital at Wigmore Hall	Released: 1984; Format: LP; Label: Etcetera (ETC 1029)	—
Britten Folk Songs and Song Cycles (with Carolyn Watkinson)	Released: 1987; Format: LP, cassette; Label:	—
Mahler Symphony No. 2	Released: 1989; Format: LP, cassette, CD; Label: Tennstedt/LPO	—
William Walton and Constant Lambert Complete Songs	Released: 1992; Format: CD; Label:	—
Simple Gifts	Released: 1993; Format: CD; Label:	—
Mozart Arias with Obbligato Instruments	Released: 1994; Format: CD; Label:	—
19th Century Heroines	Released: 1994; Format: CD; Label:	—
Bouquet of Melodies	Released: 1995; Format: CD; Label:	—
Something Wonderful	Released: 1996; Format: CD; Label:	—
Handel Arias	Released: 1998; Format: CD; Label:	—
A Christmas Gift	Released: December 1999; Format: CD; Label: Universal (465427-2)	85
A Portrait of Yvonne Kelly	Released: October 2000; Format: CD; Label: ABC Classical, Universal (456 695-2); Note: Compilation	91
Great Operatic Arias Sung in English #1	Released: 2000; Format: CD; Label:	—
Gorecki Complete Songs	Released: 2001; Format: CD; Label:	—
Great Operatic Arias Sung in English #2	Released: 2002; Format: CD; Label:	—
Make Believe, Classic Songs of Broadway	Released: October 2002; Format: CD; Label: ABC Classical, Universal (765 825-2)	91
The Salley Gardens: A Treasury of English Song	Released: 2004; Format: CD; Label:	—
Handel Cantatas & Deutsche Arien (with John Shirley-Quirk)	Released: 2004; Format: CD; Label:	—
Claire de lune	Released: 2006; Format: CD; Label:	—
Delius Songs	Released: 2007; Format: CD; Label:	—
Vienna, City of My Dreams	Released: 2008; Format: CD; Label:	—
Singing for Love (with David Hobson)	Released: 2010; Format: CD; Label: ABC Classical, Universal (4764018)	57
Strauss	Released: 2010; Format: CD; Label:	—

== Honours ==
- Kenny was made a Member of the Order of Australia (AM) in the 1989 Queen's Birthday Honour List for "services to opera". She represented the Order at the 2023 Coronation.
- Centenary Medal (2001).

== Awards and nominations ==
- In June 1999 Kenny was awarded an honorary Doctorate of Music by the University of Sydney.
- In January 2019 she won "the 2019 Australian of the Year in the UK Award" – the top honour from the Australia Day Foundation.

=== ARIA Music Awards ===
The ARIA Music Awards is an annual awards ceremony that recognises excellence, innovation, and achievement across all genres of Australian music.

Year	Nominee / work	Award	Result
1995	Simple Gifts (with Melbourne Symphony Orchestra and Vladimir Kamirski)	Best Classical Album	Won
1998	Handel: Arias (with Australian Brandenburg Orchestra and Paul Dyer)	Best Classical Album	Won
2002	Gorecki: Symphony No. 3 (with Adelaide Symphony Orchestra)	Best Classical Album	Nominated
2003	Make Believe	Best Classical Album	Nominated
2022	Ross Edwards: Frog and Star Cycle / Symphonies 2 & 3 Amy Dickson, Colin Currie, Lothar Koenigs, David Zinman, Sydney Symphony Orchestra, Markus Stenz & Melbourne Symphony Orchestra)	Best Classical Album	Nominated

=== Bernard Heinze Memorial Award ===
The Sir Bernard Heinze Memorial Award is given to a person who has made an outstanding contribution to music in Australia.

Year	Nominee / work	Award	Result
1994	Yvonne Kenny	Sir Bernard Heinze Memorial Award	awarded

=== Mo Awards ===
The Australian Entertainment Mo Awards (commonly known informally as the Mo Awards), were annual Australian entertainment industry awards. They recognise achievements in live entertainment in Australia from 1975 to 2016. Yvonne Kenny won one award in that time.

Year	Nominee / work	Award	Result (wins only)
1994	Yvonne Kenny	Operatic Performer of the Year	Won
