= Aleksandr Tsiboulski =

- Born: 1979 (age 45–46); Ukraine
- Origin: Adelaide, South Australia, Australia
- Genres: Classical
- Occupation: Musician
- Instrument: Guitar
- Labels: Naxos
- Website: tsiboulski.com

Aleksandr Tsiboulski (born 1979) is a Ukrainian-Australian classical guitarist. With his family he migrated to Adelaide in 1989, aged 10, his father was a school teacher and his mother was an engineer. Tsiboulski issued his first solo album, Fandangos y Boleros, in 2003, which was produced and audio engineered by John Taylor; it had been recorded in early May 2002 in England.

His second album, Australian Guitar Music, appeared in 2010 via Naxos Records with Norbert Kraft and Bonnie Silver producing during mid-July 2008 at St. John Chrysostom Church, Newmarket, Ontario, Canada. At the ARIA Music Awards of 2010 it was nominated for Best Classical Album.

== Discography ==
=== Albums ===
List of albums, with selected details
Title	Details
Fandangos y Boleros	Released: 2003; Format: CD; Label: APT
Australian Guitar Music	Released: 2010; Format: CD; Label: Naxos (8.570949)
Manuel Ponce. Guitar Music 3. Four Guitar Sonatas	Released: 2015; Format: CD; Label: Naxos (8.573284)

== Awards and nominations ==
=== ARIA Music Awards ===
The ARIA Music Awards is an annual awards ceremony that recognises excellence, innovation, and achievement across all genres of Australian music. They commenced in 1987.

Year	Nominee / work	Award	Result	Ref.
2010	Australian Guitar Music	Best Classical Album	Nominated	
