= Australian Brandenburg Orchestra =

Australian orchestra

The Australian Brandenburg Orchestra (ABO) is an Australian period instrument orchestra specialising in the performance of baroque and classical music.

== Founders ==
The orchestra's founder and artistic director is Paul Dyer.

In 2013 Dyer was appointed an Officer of the Order of Australia (AO) for his "distinguished service to the performing arts, particularly orchestral music as a director, conductor and musician, through the promotion of educational programs and support for emerging artists". In 2003 Paul was awarded the Australian Centenary Medal for his services to Australian society and the advancement of music and in 2010 the Sydney University Alumni Medal for Professional Achievement.

The other founder and current managing director is Bruce Applebaum.

== History ==
The orchestra was formed in 1989 by Paul Dyer and Bruce Applebaum and their name pays tribute to the Brandenburg Concertos of J. S. Bach, who was central to the Baroque period.

Since the beginning in 1989, the orchestra has become the leading voice in the Australian cultural landscape due to the purity of their work when compared with the Australian Chamber Orchestra and Sydney Symphony Orchestra.

The group under Paul Dyer and Bruce Applebaum's leadership commenced life as the Brandenburg Ensemble, then as the Brandenburg Orchestra, and finally the Australian Brandenburg Orchestra. Its first concert was in January 1990, in the Concert Hall of the Sydney Opera House.

== Venues and Programming ==
The orchestra has hired the Sydney City Recital Hall as its main venue since it opened in 2000. This venue was custom made for the ABO. The group makes regular appearances in the major concert halls and cultural venues across Australia, but more frequently in Brisbane (QPAC) and Melbourne (Melbourne Recital Centre).

The Orchestra's name pays tribute to the Brandenburg Concertos of J.S. Bach, whose musical genius was central to the Baroque era, as Paul Dyer is today. Their concerts include the music of well-known composers such as Mozart, Vivaldi and Handel, as well as lesser-known composers, rare works, and unusual replica instruments.

The group has performed with internationally renowned guest artists such as Andreas Scholl, Emma Kirkby, Derek Lee Ragin, Kristian Bezuidenhout, Andrew Manze, Philippe Jaroussky, Avi Avital, Dmitry Sinkovsky, Federico Guglielmo, Christina Pluhar, Xavier de Maistre and Elizabeth Wallfisch. Every December, the orchestra plays O Come All Ye Faithful and Stille Nacht in churches across Sydney as part of their Noël! Noël! Christmas concert series.

== Discography ==
=== Charting albums ===
List of albums, with Australian chart positions
| Title | Album details | Peak chart positions |
| Title | Album details | AUS |
|---|---|---|
| Vivaldi: Il Flauto Dolce | Released: August 2001; Format: CD; Label: ABC Music (461 828–2) | 78 |

== Awards and nominations ==
=== AIR Awards ===
The Australian Independent Record Awards (commonly known informally as AIR Awards) is an annual awards night to recognise, promote and celebrate the success of Australia's Independent Music sector.

| Year | Nominee / work | Award | Result |
|---|---|---|---|
| 2015 | Brandenburg Celebrates | Best Independent Classical Album | Won |
| 2017 | Brandenburg Celebrates | Best Independent Classical Album | Nominated |

=== ARIA Music Awards ===
The ARIA Music Awards is an annual awards ceremony that recognises excellence, innovation, and achievement across all genres of Australian music. They commenced in 1987.

| Year | Nominee / work | Award | Result | Ref. |
|---|---|---|---|---|
| 1993 | The Brandenburg Orchestra | Best Classical Album | Nominated | |
| 1995 | Handel: Opera Arias (with Graham Pushee & Paul Dyer) | Best Classical Album | Nominated | |
| 1998 | Handel: Arias (with Yvonne Kenny & Paul Dyer) | Best Classical Album | Won | |
| 1999 | If Love's a Sweet Passion (with Sara Macliver & Paul Dyer) | Best Classical Album | Nominated | |
| 2001 | Vivaldi – Ii Flauto Dolce (with Genevieve Lacey & Paul Dyer) | Best Classical Album | Won | |
| 2005 | Sanctuary | Best Classical Album | Won | |
| 2009 | Handel: Concerti Grossi Opus 6 (with Paul Dyer) | Best Classical Album | Won | |
| 2010 | Tapas – Tastes of the Baroque (with Paul Dyer) | Best Classical Album | Won | |
| 2015 | Brandenburg Celebrates | Best Classical Album | Nominated | |
