= Landscapes (Australian album) =

Compilation album by Various artists
- Released: 1989
- Label: MBS Records

Landscapes is a compilation album of various artist playing music composed by Peter Sculthorpe. It was produced by 2MBS-FM for Sculthorpe's 60th birthday. Articst and bands appearing on the album include Sculthorpe, David Bollard, Seymour Group, Geoffrey Tozer and David Pereira The album was nominated for the 1990 ARIA Award for Best Classical Album.

== Track listing ==
Requiem
1. Introit
2. Kyrie
3. Qui Mariam
4. Lacrimosa
5. Libera Me
6. Lux Aeterna

7. Djilile
8. Tailitnama Song
9. Mountains
10. Landscape II

Four Little Pieces
11. Morning Song
12. Sea Chant
13. Little Serenade
14. Left Bank Waltz
