= Vladimir Kamirski =

Polish-Australian Conductor

Włodzimierz Kamil Kamirski also known by his stage name Vladimir Kamirski (3 January 1943 - 22 April 2017) was a Polish-Australian orchestral conductor. He adopted a stage name Vladimir around 1970 at the start of his career in Italy at the Teatro Alla Scala, but continued to release recordings as Włodzimierz Kamirski also.

== Life ==
Włodzimierz Kamirski was born in Lublin, occupied Poland, during World War II. His father Władysław Kamirski was an editor-in-chief of Kurier Lubelski magazine. His mother was Maria née Radziwiłłówna. His parents relocated to Warsaw after the war ended. Włodzimierz was a prodigy, holding his first piano concert at age 5 in Warsaw. He studied under Stanisław Wisłocki at the Warsaw Conservatory, in 1968 becoming assistant conductor at the Warsaw Grand Opera Theatre. Further studies under Franco Ferrara and Paul Kletzki followed. He worked at La Scala, Milan, the Royal Opera, Brussels, and the Warsaw and Łódź Grand Opera Theatres. In 1973 he became general music director of the Polish Radio and Television Symphony Orchestras. In 1977 he was invited to conduct the Leningrad Philharmonic Orchestra.

In 1983 he emigrated to Sydney, Australia to join his partner Ewa, whom he married soon thereafter. His debut with the Australian Opera came in 1985 in its Melbourne season of Gounod's Roméo et Juliette. The following year he led Verdi's Requiem from St Mary's Cathedral, Sydney with the Sydney Symphony Orchestra, broadcast live on ABC Television. In 1988 Kamirski was appointed chief guest conductor of the Queensland Symphony Orchestra, and also conducted Opera Queensland's production of Bizet's Carmen. He also conducted other orchestras throughout Australia and New Zealand.

His recording Simple Gifts with soprano Yvonne Kenny and the Melbourne Symphony Orchestra won the Best Classical Album at the ARIA Music Awards of 1995.

He became an Australian citizen in 1986. He died in Sydney on 22 April 2017.

== Awards and nominations ==
=== ARIA Music Awards ===
The ARIA Music Awards is an annual awards ceremony held by the Australian Recording Industry Association. They commenced in 1987.

Year	Nominee / work	Award	Result	Ref.
1995	Simple Gifts (with Yvonne Kenny & Melbourne Symphony Orchestra)	Best Classical Album	Won	
