= Woof! (band) =

Australian percussion ensemble

- Origin: Melbourne, Victoria, Australia
- Genres: Classical
- Years active: 1995–2002
- Past members: Robert Cossom; Matthew Goddard; Stephen Hardie; Tracey Patten; Christine Baker; Ben Smart; Bec Matthews

Woof! or Woof! Percussion Ensemble were an Australian classical music, four-piece percussion ensemble formed in February 1995 by Robert Cossom, Matthew Goddard, Stephen Hardie and Tracey Patten. In July 1997 they appeared on Australian Broadcasting Corporation's radio, ABC Classic FM's Sunday Live presented by Peter Clarke performing at Iwaki Auditorium, Melbourne. Instrumentation used included xylophone, marimba, vibraphone, drums, key and non-pitched percussion, and log drums.

Their album, Percy Grainger: Tuneful Percussion or Tuneful Percussion (2000), featuring arrangements and compositions by Percy Grainger, received a nomination at the ARIA Music Awards of 2001 for Best Classical Album. It was recorded between May and November 1999 by the ensemble of Goddard, Hardie, Patten and Christine Baker on percussion. They were joined in the studio by Mary Anderson on harp, Kirsten Boerema on vocals (mezzo-soprano), Wendy Clarke on flute and piccolo, Sylvia Hosking on double bass, Mark Knoop on celeste, harmonium and piano, London String Quartet on strings, Vaughan McAlley on vocals (tenor) and Clifford Plumpton on vocals (bass). James Manheim of AllMusic rated it at four-out-of-five stars and explained, "presents music from a neglected aspect of Grainger's output: his music for 'tuned percussion,' which he defined as glockenspiels, xylophones, and bells, augmented by such related instruments as the celeste, piano, and the instruments of the Javanese and Balinese gamelan orchestras."

== Members ==
- Robert Cossom
- Matthew Goddard
- Stephen Hardie
- Tracey Patten
- Christine Baker
- Ben Smart
- Bec Matthews

== Discography ==
=== Albums ===
List of albums, with selected details
| Title | Details |
|---|---|
| Tuneful Percussion | Released: 2000; Format: CD; Label: Move Records (MD 3222) |

== Awards and nominations ==
=== ARIA Music Awards ===
The ARIA Music Awards is an annual awards ceremony that recognises excellence, innovation, and achievement across all genres of Australian music. They commenced in 1987.

| Year | Nominee / work | Award | Result | Ref. |
|---|---|---|---|---|
| 2001 | Tuneful Percussion | Best Classical Album | Nominated | |
