= Stuart Challender =

Background information
- Born: Stuart David Challender; 19 February 1947; Hobart, Tasmania, Australia
- Died: 13 December 1991 (aged 44) Sydney, Australia
- Genres: Classical, Opera
- Occupation: Conductor
- Years active: 1970–1991
- Formerly of: The Australian Opera; Elizabethan Sydney Orchestra; Sydney Symphony Orchestra

Stuart David Challender AO (19 February 1947 – 13 December 1991) was an Australian conductor, known particularly for his work with The Australian Opera, Elizabethan Sydney Orchestra and the Sydney Symphony Orchestra.

== Early life ==
Challender was born in February 1947 at Hobart. His initial passion for music came from his grandmother, Thelma Driscoll, who used to sing to him as a child. In 1960, his father took him to a performance of Beethoven's Pastoral Symphony conducted by Tibor Paul, from which he decided to become a conductor.

In 1964, at age 17, Challender attended the Victorian Conservatorium of Music, at the University of Melbourne. From 1966 he worked with the then Victorian Opera Company. In 1968 he graduated from the Conservatorium and was the Victorian Opera Company's music director.

== Conducting career ==
Challender began his professional conducting career in 1970. His first engagement was Kiss Me, Kate, for the Lucerne Opera. He was appointed assistant conductor at the Staatstheater Nürnberg; then came engagements in Switzerland at Zürich and Basel, where he was resident conductor at the Opera House from 1976 to 1980.

Upon returning to Australia from Europe, he joined the staff of The Australian Opera. In late 1980 Challender was assigned to conduct a single performance of The Barber of Seville, and soon after he was appointed resident conductor of the Elizabethan Sydney Orchestra and went on to conduct many of the great standards of opera.

Challender succeeded Zdeněk Mácal as chief conductor of the Sydney Symphony Orchestra from 1987 to 1991, to great acclaim. In Australia's bicentennial year (1988), he led the orchestra in a successful tour of the United States, a 12-city tour that culminated with a concert at the United Nations General Assembly in New York to mark 200 years of European settlement in Australia. He conducted the Boston Symphony Orchestra in Hong Kong in 1989 and in 1990 conducted the Chicago Symphony Orchestra in four concerts. Several recordings which he made with the SSO are still available on commercially released CDs.

On 26 January 1991, he was appointed an Officer of the Order of Australia (AO) "in recognition of services to music". In June of that year, his health visibly failing, Challender conducted his last concert in Hobart, with the Tasmanian Symphony Orchestra.

== Death ==
Challender died of an AIDS-related disease on 13 December 1991. One week later, on 20 December, at the Sydney Town Hall, Justice Michael Kirby led the speakers at a celebration of Challender's life. A seven-minute piece for solo cello by Peter Sculthorpe titled Threnody: In memoriam Stuart Challender was performed by David Pereira.

In his will, Challender provided for the establishment of the Stuart Challender Foundation, to aid the training and development of future Australian conductors. He bequeathed his extensive collection of scores to the Music Library at the University of Tasmania.

Ross Edwards's Symphony No. 1 Da Pacem Domine (1995) was dedicated to Challender's memory.

== Discography ==
All recordings with the Sydney Symphony Orchestra.

- Voss, opera by Richard Meale (Philips, 1987)
- 1812 - Danny Boy - Bolero (ABC, 1989)
- Symphony Under the Stars (ABC, 1989)
- Earth Cry - Kakadu - Mangrove, works by Peter Sculthorpe (ABC, 1989)
- Carl Vine: Three Symphonies (ABC, 1991)
- Nexus - Nocturnes (Vox Australis, 1991)

== Awards ==
=== ARIA Music Awards ===
The ARIA Music Awards is an annual awards ceremony that recognises excellence, innovation, and achievement across all genres of Australian music.

Year	Nominee / work	Award	Result
1991	Sculthorpe: Orchestral Works (with Sydney Symphony Orchestra)	Best Classical Album	Won
1992	Vine: Three Symphonies (with Sydney Symphony Orchestra)	Best Classical Album	Won
1994	Ross Edwards Orchestral Works (with Sydney Symphony Orchestra, Dene Olding and Porcelijn)	Best Classical Album	Won

=== Mo Awards ===
The Australian Entertainment Mo Awards (commonly known informally as the Mo Awards), were annual Australian entertainment industry awards. They recognise achievements in live entertainment in Australia from 1975 to 2016. Stuart Challender won three awards in that time.

Year	Nominee / work	Award	Result (wins only)
1989	Stuart Challender	Australian Performer of the Year	Won
1990	Stuart Challender	Classical Performance of the Year	Won
1991	Stuart Challender	Classical Performance of the Year	Won

== Bibliography ==
- Davis, Richard. Close to the Flame: the Life of Stuart Challender, Wakefield Press, 2017, Sydney

Cultural offices
Preceded by Zdeněk Mácal	Chief Conductor of the Sydney Symphony Orchestra; 1987–1991	Succeeded by Edo de Waart
