= Accademia Arcadia =

- Also known as: Arcadia
- Years active: 2001 -

Accademia Arcadia, sometimes called Arcadia, is an Australian baroque ensemble formed in 2001 by Jacqueline Ogeil. Their album Trio Sonatas received a nomination for the 2007 ARIA Award for Best Classical Album.

== Members ==
- Jacqueline Ogeil - organ
- Rosanne Hunt - cello
- Josephine Vains - cello
- Davide Monti - violin
- Lucinda Moon - violin
- Rachael Beesley - violin
- Julia Fredersdorf - violin
- Catherine Shugg - violin
- Ross Mitchell - violin
- John Quaine - violin
- Ruth Wilkinson - viola da gamba
- Margaret Pearce - soprano
- Margaret Pearce - soprano
- Michael Leighton Jones - bass

== Discography ==
=== Albums ===
List of albums, with selected details
Title	Details
Dietrich Buxtehude Cantatas	Released: October 2001; Format: CD; Label:
Handel – Italian Cantatas	Released: 2004; Format: CD; Label:
Trio Sonatas	Released: 2007; Format: CD; Label: Tall Poppies
Il Diavolo	Released: 2017; Format: CD; Label: Tall Poppies

== Awards and nominations ==
=== ARIA Music Awards ===
The ARIA Music Awards is an annual awards ceremony that recognises excellence, innovation, and achievement across all genres of Australian music. They commenced in 1987.

Year	Nominee / work	Award	Result	Ref.
2007	Trio Sonatas	Best Classical Album	Nominated	
