= Geoffrey Lancaster =

Australian pianist and conductor

Geoffrey Lancaster AO FAHA

Background information
- Born: 20 August 1954 (age 71); Sydney
- Genres: Classical
- Occupations: Musician, educator
- Instruments: Piano, fortepiano, harpsichord
- Years active: 1970–present
- Website: http://www.waapa.ecu.edu.au

Geoffrey Lancaster AO FAHA (born 20 August 1954) is an Australian classical pianist and conductor. Born in Sydney, he was raised in Dubbo, New South Wales before moving to Canberra. He attended the Canberra School of Music where he studied piano with Larry Sitsky. He also studied at the Sydney Conservatorium of Music, graduating with a Doctor of Philosophy, and also completed a master's degree at the University of Tasmania. In 1984, he moved to Amsterdam to study fortepiano with Stanley Hoogland at the Royal Conservatory of The Hague. In 1996 he was a professor at the Royal College of Music in London, following which he worked at the School of Music at the University of Western Australia. He was a professor of the ANU School of Music from 2000 until 2012. Now based in Perth, he is Professor of the Western Australian Academy of Performing Arts at Edith Cowan University.

== Life and career ==
Lancaster is an expert in historical performance practice of the works of Joseph Haydn, Wolfgang Amadeus Mozart, and Ludwig van Beethoven and has appeared as concerto soloist and conductor with all of the major Australian orchestras including the symphony orchestras of Queensland, Melbourne, Sydney and Tasmania, the Australian Chamber Orchestra, as well as the Tafelmusik Baroque Orchestra, Toronto. He has toured Germany, Switzerland, China and Japan as soloist with leading international orchestras including the Leipzig Gewandhaus Orchestra, Royal Stockholm Philharmonic Orchestra, Gürzenich Orchestra of Cologne, New Zealand Symphony Orchestra, and the Rotterdam Philharmonic Orchestra. He also tours Australia for Musica Viva Australia. He has worked extensively with the German conductor Markus Stenz, as well as with Bruno Weil, Sir Charles Mackerras, Gustav Leonhardt, and Nikolaus Harnoncourt.

Lancaster also works with smaller orchestras including the Canberra Symphony Orchestra and La Cetra Barockorchester Basel as both soloist and conductor. He is artistic director of the Ensemble of the Classic Era.

Geoffrey Lancaster is also a professor of music and teaches 18th Century Performance Practice, piano, harpsichord and fortepiano. From 1999 to 2009 he taught at the Australian National Academy of Music, University of Melbourne. He was Head of the Keyboard Department at the Australian National University, and a member of the ANU Academic Board. He continues his research and teaching at the UWA School of Music and the Western Australian Academy of Performing Arts and as a member of the Academic Board of Edith Cowan University. He also teaches at the Schola Cantorum Basiliensis.

== Recordings ==
Geoffrey Lancaster has recorded 51 CDs with major labels including the Sony Classical label, Australian Broadcasting Corporation, Tall Poppies, and Supraphon.

== Awards and recognition ==
Geoffrey Lancaster has received many significant awards. In 1986, he won the 23rd Festival of Flanders International Mozart Fortepiano Competition in Belgium, becoming the first Australian to win a major international keyboard competition.

In 1993, Geoffrey Lancaster was awarded the $240,000 four-year Australian Artists Creative Fellowship by Paul Keating and the Australia Council for his outstanding artistic contribution to the nation.

In 2000, Lancaster was awarded the "H. C. Coombs Creative Arts Fellowship" at the Australian National University. In 2006, in recognition of his inspirational role as musician and mentor, Geoffrey was named Australian of the Year for the Australian Capital Territory, as part of the National Australia Day Awards. He also received the University of Tasmania Distinguished Alumni Award, for service to the community. He was appointed Honorary Professor of the University of Tasmania in 2007, and elected a Fellow of the Australian College of Educators (FACE). He is an Honorary Fellow of the Australian Academy of the Humanities. In recognition of his contribution to the arts and music education, he was appointed a Member of the Order of Australia in 2006. He was promoted to Officer of the Order of Australia in the 2022 Australia Day Honours for "distinguished service to the arts, particularly music, through education, performance, research and philanthropy".

=== ARIA Music Awards ===
The ARIA Music Awards is an annual awards ceremony that recognises excellence, innovation, and achievement across all genres of Australian music. They commenced in 1987.

Year	Nominee / work	Award	Result	Ref.
1992	Fortepiano	Best Classical Album	Nominated	
1993	Mozart Sonatas for Fortepiano	Best Classical Album	Nominated	
2002	Haydn: Keyboard Sonatas Volume 1	Best Classical Album	Nominated	
2010	Haydn: Complete Keyboard Sonatas, Vol. 1	Best Classical Album	Nominated	
