= Diana Doherty =

Australian oboist

Diana Doherty is an Australian oboist, currently Principal Oboe with the Sydney Symphony Orchestra.

== Biography ==
Diana Doherty was born in Brisbane, where she began her education. She attended Brisbane State High School. She studied both piano and oboe at the Queensland Conservatorium of Music, before completing her Bachelor of Arts in Music Performance at the Victorian College of the Arts in Melbourne, from where she was awarded the M.E.N.S.A prize for the top graduating student. In 1985 she was a prize winner in the ABC Symphony Australia Young Performers Awards.

She has studied in Zürich with Thomas Indermühle and also taken courses with Maurice Bourgue.

Doherty has performed regularly as a soloist, with performances at various international festivals: the Prague Spring Festival; the MusicaRiva festival in Italy; Bratislava Music Festival; the Young Artist in Concert Festival in Davos, Switzerland. She has toured extensively within the United States, giving recitals and masterclasses, as well as performing in the Chamber Music series at the Spoleto Festival USA in Charleston, South Carolina, and a concerto performance at the Lincoln Center for the Performing Arts.

From 1990 to 1997, she was Principal Oboe in the Lucerne Symphony Orchestra. In July 1997 she returned to Australia and joined the Sydney Symphony Orchestra as Principal Oboe.

She premiered Ross Edwards' Oboe Concerto in 2002, under the baton of Lorin Maazel. This unusual work includes choreography for the oboist-cum-dancer. Maazel invited her to play and dance it with the New York Philharmonic in 2005, and Doherty has since become particularly associated with the concerto.

She has recorded the Ross Edwards concerto, as well as works by Haydn, Mozart, Martinů, Bernd Alois Zimmermann, Graeme Koehne, Carl Vine, and others, with orchestras such as the Melbourne Symphony Orchestra, Lucerne Symphony Orchestra, Sydney Symphony Orchestra, Tasmanian Symphony Orchestra, Sinfonia Australis, and the Queensland Orchestra, and under conductors such as Arvo Volmer, Olaf Henzold, Takuo Yuasa, Ola Rudner, Mark Summerbell and Werner Andreas Albert.

Diana Doherty uses a Marigaux M2 oboe.

In 2024 Doherty announced her retirement from the Sydney Symphony Orchestra.

== Personal life ==
Doherty is married to Alexandre Oguey, principal cor anglais with the Sydney Symphony Orchestra. They have two adult children.

== Discography ==
| Title | Details |
|---|---|
| Blues For D.D. (with David Korevaar) | Released: 2000; Label: ABC Classic (465782-2) |
| Souvenirs - Sublime Music for the Oboe | Released: 2003; Label: ABC Music (980046-3) |
| Oboe Concerto (with Ross Edwards, Arvo Volmer and Melbourne Symphony Orchestra) | Released: 2004; Label: ABC Classic (4767173) |
| Inflight Entertainment (with Graeme Koehne and Sydney Symphony Orchestra) | Released: 2004; Label: Naxos (8.555847) |
| Nigel Westlake: Spirit of the Wild / Steve Reich: The Desert Music (with Nigel Westlake, Sydney Symphony Orchestra and David Robertson) | Released: 2019; Label: ABC Classic (4817899) |

== Awards ==
She has won prizes in the International Lyceum Club Competition; the International Chamber Music Competition in Martigny; and the Prague Spring Festival Competition. In 1995 she won the Young Concert Artists International Auditions.

=== APRA Awards ===
The APRA Awards are held in Australia and New Zealand by the Australasian Performing Right Association to recognise songwriting skills, sales and airplay performance by its members annually.

| Year | Nominee / work | Award | Result |
|---|---|---|---|
| 2003 | Concerto for Oboe and Orchestra | Best Performance of an Australian Composition | Won |

=== ARIA Awards ===
The ARIA Music Awards are annual awards, which recognises excellence, innovation, and achievement across all genres of Australian music. They commenced in 1987.

| Year | Nominee / work | Award | Result |
|---|---|---|---|
| 2004 | Souvenirs | Best Classical Album | Nominated |
| 2019 | Nigel Westlake: Spirit of the Wild / Steve Reich: The Desert Music | Best Classical Album | Nominated |

=== Mo Awards ===
The Australian Entertainment Mo Awards (commonly known informally as the Mo Awards), were annual Australian entertainment industry awards. They recognise achievements in live entertainment in Australia from 1975 to 2016. Diana Doherty won one award in that time.

| Year | Nominee / work | Award | Result (wins only) |
|---|---|---|---|
| 2000 | Diana Doherty | Classical/Opera Performer of the Year | Won |
