= 2010 ARIA Music Awards =

Annual Australian music awards ceremony

- Date: 7 November 2010
- Venue: Sydney Opera House, Sydney, New South Wales

Highlights
- Most wins: Angus & Julia Stone (5)
- Most nominations: Angus & Julia Stone (9)
- Website: ariaawards.com.au

Television/radio coverage
- Network: Network Ten

The 24th Annual Australian Recording Industry Association Music Awards (generally known as the ARIA Music Awards or simply the ARIAs) are a series of award ceremonies which included the 2010 ARIA Artisan Awards, ARIA Hall of Fame Awards, ARIA Fine Arts Awards and ARIA Awards. The latter ceremony took place on 7 November at the Sydney Opera House and was telecast by Network Ten at 8:30pm. The final nominees for ARIA Award categories were announced on 28 September at the Sydney Conservatorium of Music, as well as nominees for Fine Arts Awards and winners of the Artisan Awards. The 2010 awards were hosted by Rebel Wilson, Dylan Lewis and Natalie Bassingthwaighte and included presenters Russell Brand, and Matt Lucas.

For the first time in ARIA Awards history, public votes are used in four new categories, "Most Popular Australian Album", "Most Popular Australian Single", "Most Popular International Artist" and "Most Popular Australian Artist".

On 27 October, the ARIA Hall of Fame inducted: The Church, The Loved Ones, Models, John Williamson and Johnny Young.

== Multiple winners and nominees ==
- Angus & Julia Stone – 5 wins from 9 nominations
- Sia – 3 wins from 6 nominations
- Washington – 2 wins from 6 nominations
- Powderfinger – 2 wins from 5 nominations
- The Temper Trap – 2 wins from 5 nominations
- Dan Sultan – 2 wins from 3 nominations
- Birds of Tokyo – 1 win from 7 nominations
- Guy Sebastian – 5 nominations
- Tame Impala – 5 nominations

== ARIA Hall of Fame Inductees ==
The following artists were inducted into the 2010 ARIA Hall of Fame on 27 October at Sydney's Hordern Pavilion; the ceremony was telecast by SBS TV's RocKwiz at 9:20 p.m on 30 October.

- The Church by George Negus
- The Loved Ones by Michael Chugg
- Models by Wendy Matthews
- John Williamson by Bob Brown
- Johnny Young by Tina Arena

== Awards ==
=== ARIA Awards ===
Three new categories introduced, "Breakthrough Artist" (formerly "Breakthrough Artist – Single" and "Breakthrough Artist – Album"), "Best Hard Rock / Heavy Metal Album" and "Best Adult Alternative Album".
Final nominees are shown, with result at right.

Album of the Year
Artist	Album	Result
Angus & Julia Stone	Down the Way	Won
Birds of Tokyo	Birds of Tokyo	Nominated
Sia	We Are Born	Nominated
Tame Impala	Innerspeaker	Nominated
Washington	I Believe You Liar	Nominated
Single of the Year
Artist	Single	Result
Angus & Julia Stone	"Big Jet Plane"	Won
Birds of Tokyo	"Plans"	Nominated
Sia	"Clap Your Hands"	Nominated
The Temper Trap	"Love Lost"	Nominated
Washington	"How to Tame Lions"	Nominated
Best Female Artist
Artist	Album	Result
Clare Bowditch	Modern Day Addiction	Nominated
Kylie Minogue	Aphrodite	Nominated
Lisa Mitchell	"Oh! Hark!"	Nominated
Sia	We Are Born	Nominated
Washington	I Believe You Liar	Won
Best Male Artist
Artist	Album	Result
Dan Kelly	Dan Kelly's Dream	Nominated
Dan Sultan	Get Out While You Can	Won
Guy Sebastian	Like It Like That	Nominated
John Butler	April Uprising	Nominated
Paul Dempsey	"Fast Friends"	Nominated
Best Group
Artist	Album	Result
Angus & Julia Stone	Down the Way	Nominated
Birds of Tokyo	Birds of Tokyo	Nominated
Powderfinger	Golden Rule	Nominated
Tame Impala	Innerspeaker	Nominated
The Temper Trap	Conditions	Won
Best Independent Release
Artist	Album	Result
Art vs. Science	Magic Fountain	Nominated
Dan Sultan	Get Out While You Can	Nominated
Eddy Current Suppression Ring	Rush to Relax	Nominated
John Butler Trio	April Uprising	Nominated
Sia	We Are Born	Won
Best Adult Alternative Album
Artist	Album	Result
Angus & Julia Stone	Down the Way	Won
Basement Birds	Basement Birds	Nominated
Clare Bowditch	Modern Day Addiction	Nominated
The Cat Empire	Cinema	Nominated
Washington	I Believe You Liar	Nominated
Whitley	Go Forth, Find Mammoth	Nominated
Best Adult Contemporary Album
Artist	Album	Result
Angie Hart	Eat My Shadow	Nominated
Crowded House	Intriguer	Won
Jimmy Barnes	The Rhythm and the Blues	Nominated
Lisa Miller	Car Tape 2	Nominated
Perry Keyes	Johnny Ray's Downtown	Nominated
Best Blues & Roots Album
Artist	Album	Result
Ash Grunwald	Hot Mama Vibes	Nominated
Dan Sultan	Get Out While You Can	Won
Jeff Lang	Chimeradour	Nominated
John Butler Trio	April Uprising	Nominated
The Wilson Pickers	Shake It Down	Nominated
Best Children's Album
Artist	Album	Result
Greta Bradman	Forest of Dreams: Classical Lullabies to Get Lost In	Nominated
Jay Laga'aia	I Can Play Anything	Nominated
Justine Clarke	Great Big World	Nominated
Little Kasey Chambers, Poppa Bill and the Little Hillbillies	Little Kasey Chambers, Poppa Bill and the Little Hillbillies	Nominated
The Wiggles	Let's Eat!	Won
Best Comedy Release
Artist	Album	Result
Andrew Hansen, Chris Taylor & Craig Shuftan	The Blow Parade	Won
Arj Barker	Arj Barker Forever	Nominated
Heath Franklin	Heath Franklin's Chopper: Make Deadsh*ts History	Nominated
Jimeoin	Jimeoin on Ice Live	Nominated
The Bedroom Philosopher	Songs from the 86 Tram	Nominated
Best Country Album
Artist	Album	Result
Adam Harvey	Both Sides Now	Nominated
Catherine Britt	Catherine Britt	Nominated
Jason Walker	Ceiling Sun Letters	Nominated
Lee Kernaghan	Planet Country	Nominated
The McClymonts	Wrapped Up Good	Won
Best Dance Release
Artist	Single	Result
Art vs Science	"Magic Fountain"	Nominated
Miami Horror	"Sometimes"	Nominated
Midnight Juggernauts	"The Crystal Axis"	Nominated
Pendulum	"Immersion"	Nominated
Yolanda Be Cool & DCUP	"We No Speak Americano"	Won
Best Hard Rock/Heavy Metal Album
Artist	Album	Result
Airbourne	No Guts. No Glory.	Nominated
Dead Letter Circus	This Is the Warning	Nominated
Parkway Drive	Deep Blue	Won
The Amity Affliction	Youngbloods	Nominated
Violent Soho	Violent Soho	Nominated
Best Music DVD
Artist	DVD	Result
Birds of Tokyo	The Broken Strings Tour DVD	Nominated
Bliss n Eso	Flying Colours Live	Nominated
Josh Pyke	The Lighthouse	Nominated
Various Artists	Sound Relief	Won
Various Artists	Before Too Long: Triple J's Tribute to Paul Kelly	Nominated
Best Pop Release
Artist	Release	Result
Bluejuice	Head of the Hawk	Nominated
Empire of the Sun	"Half Mast"	Nominated
Guy Sebastian	Like It Like That	Nominated
Kylie Minogue	Aphrodite	Nominated
Sia	We Are Born	Won
Best Rock Album
Artist	Album	Result
Birds of Tokyo	Birds of Tokyo	Won
Cloud Control	Bliss Release	Nominated
Eddy Current Suppression Ring	Rush to Relax	Nominated
Powderfinger	Golden Rule	Nominated
Tame Impala	Innerspeaker	Nominated
Best Urban Album
Artist	Album	Result
Bliss n Eso	Running on Air	Nominated
Lowrider	Round the World	Nominated
M-Phazes	Good Gracious	Won
Space Invadas	Soul-Fi	Nominated
Urthboy	Spitshine	Nominated
Breakthrough Artist
Artist	Album	Result
Amy Meredith	Restless	Nominated
Cloud Control	Bliss Release	Nominated
Philadelphia Grand Jury	Hope Is for Hopers	Nominated
Tame Impala	Innerspeaker	Nominated
Washington	I Believe You Liar	Won

=== Fine Arts Awards ===
"Best Jazz Album" category was moved to Fine Arts Awards from ARIA Awards section.
Final nominees are shown, with result at right.

Best Classical Album
Artist	Album	Result
Aleksandr Tsiboulski	Australian Guitar Music	Nominated
Australian Brandenburg Orchestra & Paul Dyer	Tapas – Tastes of the Baroque	Won
Li-Wei Qin	Beethoven Cello Sonatas	Nominated
David Hobson	Enchanted Way	Nominated
Geoffrey Lancaster	Haydn: Complete Keyboard Sonatas, Vol. 1	Nominated
Richard Tognetti, Christopher Moore & Australian Chamber Orchestra	Mozart Violin Concertos	Nominated
Teddy Tahu Rhodes	Bach Arias	Nominated
Best Jazz Album
Artist	Album	Result
Dick Hughes & Christa Hughes	Twenty First Century Blues	Nominated
James Morrison & The Idea of North	Feels Like Spring	Won
Joe Chindamo	Another Place Some Other Time	Nominated
Joseph Tawadros	The Hour of Separation	Nominated
The Necks	Silverwater	Nominated
Best Original Soundtrack/Cast/Show Album
Artist	Album	Result
Burkhard Dallwitz	Underbelly	Nominated
Christopher Gordon & Various Artists	Mao's Last Dancer	Nominated
Soundtrack	Before Too Long: Triple J's Tribute to Paul Kelly	Won
Various Artists	Bran Nue Dae	Nominated
Various Artists	Accidents Happen	Nominated
Best World Music Album
Artist	Album	Result
Archie Roach	Music Deli Presents Archie Roach 1988	Nominated
Joseph Tawadros	The Prophet: Music Inspired by the Poetry of Kahlil Gibran	Nominated
Mamadou Diabate, Bobby Singh & Jeff Lang	Djan Djan	Won
The Public Opinion Afro Orchestra	Do Anything Go Anywhere	Nominated
Xavier Rudd	Koonyum Sun	Nominated

=== Artisan Awards ===
The winners and nominees of the Artisan Awards were announced on 28 September 2010.
Final nominees and winners, results shown at right.

Best Cover Art
Cover Artist	Musical artist	Album	Result
Angus & Julia Stone	Angus & Julia Stone	Down the Way	Won
Cameron Gray & Scott Smith	Dead Letter Circus	This Is the Warning	Nominated
David Homer, Aaron Hayward, Debaser	Birds of Tokyo	Birds of Tokyo	Nominated
Debaser	Bluejuice	Head of the Hawk	Nominated
Leif Podhajsky	Tame Impala	Innerspeaker	Nominated
Best Video
Director	Musical artist	Single	Result
Alex Roberts	Art vs. Science	"Magic Fountain"	Nominated
Krozm (Chris Hill, Ewan Macleod and Lachlan Dickie)	Sarah Blasko	"Bird on a Wire"	Nominated
Head Pictures	Powderfinger	"All of the Dreamers"	Nominated
Kiku Ohe	Angus & Julia Stone	"Big Jet Plane"	Nominated
Kris Moyes	Sia	"Clap Your Hands"	Won
Engineer of the Year
Engineer	Musical artist	Release	Result
Jeff McCormack	Adam Harvey	Both Sides Now	Nominated
John Castle	Washington	I Believe You Liar	Nominated
Rick Will	Grinspoon	Six to Midnight	Nominated
Victor Van Vugt	Clare Bowditch	Modern Day Addiction	Nominated
Wayne Connolly	Paul Dempsey	"Fast Friends"	Won
Producer of the Year
Producer	Musical artist	Release	Result
Angus & Julia Stone	Angus & Julia Stone	Down the Way (some tracks only) (Note: Angus and Julia Stone produced "Black Crow", "For You", "Santa Monica Dream", "Yellow Brick Road", "Walk It Off", and "Hush".)	Won
Charles Fisher, Hoodoo Gurus	Charles Fisher, Hoodoo Gurus	Purity of Essence	Nominated
Forrester Savel	Dead Letter Circus	This Is the Warning	Nominated
Lisa Miller, Shane O'Mara	Lisa Miller	Car Tape 2	Nominated
Scott Horscroft, Adam Spark	Birds of Tokyo	Birds of Tokyo	Nominated

=== Public voted awards ===
For the first time in ARIA Awards history, the public voted in four new categories. Initial nominees for both "Most Popular Australian Album" and "Most Popular Australian Single" were the ten highest selling albums and singles, respectively, in the eligibility period (28 August 2009 to 21 August 2010 inclusive). The third category is "Most Popular International Artist" where non-Australian artists with highest selling albums or singles are nominated. "Most Popular Australian Artist" nominees are pooled from the finalists in 26 categories of the year's ARIA Awards (excludes ARIA Artisan Awards nominees). First round of voting occurred from 14 to 28 October to determine the final five nominees. The second round of voting occurred from 31 October to 6 November with the winners announced on 7 November. Final nominees are shown, with result at right.

Most Popular Australian Album
Artist	Album	Result
Angus & Julia Stone	Down the Way	Nominated
Guy Sebastian	Like It Like That	Nominated
Vanessa Amorosi	Hazardous	Nominated
Powderfinger	Golden Rule	Won
The Temper Trap	Conditions	Nominated
Most Popular Australian Single
Artist	Single	Result
Guy Sebastian	"Like It Like That"	Nominated
Kate Miller-Heidke	"The Last Day on Earth"	Nominated
The Temper Trap	"Sweet Disposition"	Won
Vanessa Amorosi	"This Is Who I Am"	Nominated
Yolanda Be Cool & Dcup	"We No Speak Americano"	Nominated
Most Popular International Artist
Artist		Result
Katy Perry		Nominated
Lady Gaga		Nominated
Michael Bublé		Nominated
Mumford & Sons		Won
Taylor Swift		Nominated
Most Popular Australian Artist
Artist		Result
Angus & Julia Stone		Nominated
Guy Sebastian		Nominated
Powderfinger		Won
The Temper Trap		Nominated
Vanessa Amorosi		Nominated

== See also ==
- Music of Australia
