= Lothar Koenigs =

German conductor (born 1965)

Lothar Koenigs (born 1965 in Aachen, Germany) is a German conductor.

== Biography ==
Koenigs grew up in Aachen, in West Germany; as a young boy, he was a chorister at Aachen Cathedral, where he sang all of Anton Bruckner's masses and motets, and developed a special affinity for Bruckner's music.

Koenigs received his general secondary education at Aachen's Kaiser-Karls-Gymnasium, while studying piano and conducting at the Cologne Conservatory.

=== Career ===
After his studies, he held appointments in Hagen, Münster and Bonn. From 2000 to 2003, he was Generalmusikdirektor (GMD) at the Osnabrück Theatre. His freelance work since his Osnabrück tenure has included engagements at the Opéra National de Lyon of Wozzeck (2003), a Janáček cycle of Jenufa, Káťa Kabanová and The Makropulos Affair (2004), and Lohengrin (2006).

Koenigs first conducted the orchestra of Welsh National Opera (WNO) in January 2005. He subsequently appeared as a guest conductor in WNO productions of Salome and Khovanshchina. In July 2008, WNO appointed Koenigs its next music director, effective with the 2009–2010 season. His initial WNO contract was for five years. He made his Proms conducting debut on 17 July 2010 with a concert performance of Die Meistersinger von Nürnberg, with Bryn Terfel as Hans Sachs, in the first complete performance of Die Meistersinger at The Proms. He concluded his WNO tenure after the 2015–2016 season.

In the United States, Koenigs made his first conducting appearance at the Metropolitan Opera in December 2008 with Don Giovanni. He returned to the Metropolitan Opera as a substitute for James Levine in the new William Kentridge production, in November 2015, of Alban Berg's Lulu. In April 2019, he conducted La clemenza di Tito with the Metropolitan Opera. Durante el año 1.989 fué director de la Orquesta Sinfonica de Chile.

Preceded by Jean-Francois Monnard	Generalmusikdirektor, Theater Osnabrück; 1989-2003	Succeeded by Hermann Bäumer
Preceded by Carlo Rizzi	Music Director, Welsh National Opera; 2009-2016	Succeeded by Tomáš Hanus
