= Ross Edwards (composer) =

Australian composer

Ross Edwards AM
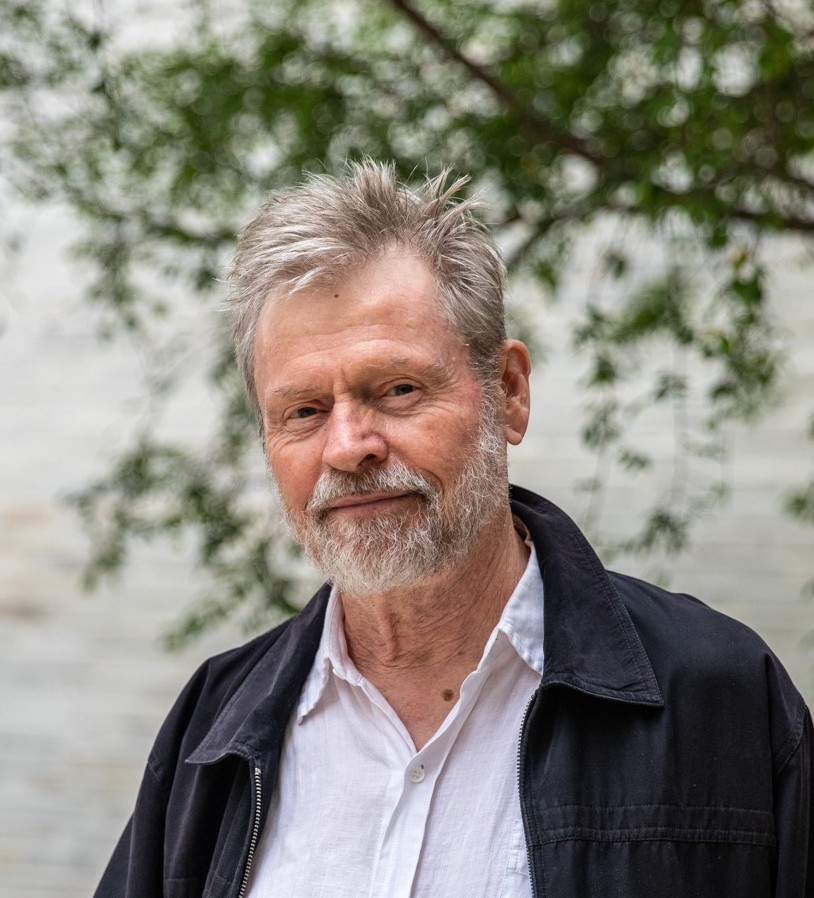
- Born: 23 December 1943 (age 82); Sydney, Australia
- Parent(s): Frank Edwards, Majorie Robertson
- Relatives: George Robertson (Great-grandfather)

Ross Edwards AM (born 23 December 1943) is an Australian composer of a wide variety of music including orchestral and chamber music, choral music, children's music, opera and film music. His distinctive sound world reflects his interest in deep ecology and his belief in the need to reconnect music with elemental forces, as well as restore its traditional association with ritual and dance. He also recognises the profound importance of music as an agent of healing. His music, universal in that it is concerned with age-old mysteries surrounding humanity, is at the same time connected to its roots in Australia, whose cultural diversity it celebrates, and from whose natural environment it draws inspiration, especially birdsong and the mysterious patterns and drones of insects. As a composer living and working on the Pacific Rim, he is aware of the exciting potential of this vast region.

== Early life and education ==
Ross Edwards was born and raised in Sydney, Australia. His parents were Frank Edwards, an engineer, and Marjorie Robertson. His great-grandfather was the publisher George Robertson of Angus & Robertson. Drawn to music at an early age, his first attempts at composition date from his fourth year, but it was not until the age of 13, when taken to a concert by the Sydney Symphony Orchestra by his aunt that featured Beethoven's Fifth Symphony and Liszt's First Piano Concerto, that he became intensely aware of his vocation to become a composer.

Edwards attended Sydney Grammar School, which did not offer music at the time. At 15 years of age, Edwards was granted permission to enter the New South Wales Conservatorium of Music to study piano, oboe, harmony, counterpoint and theory during lunch hours and weekends. In 1963, after being awarded a Commonwealth Scholarship to the University of Sydney, he enrolled in a Bachelor of Arts degree, but became frustrated and dropped out after a year. Due to the benevolent intervention of composers Peter Sculthorpe and Peter Maxwell Davies, he was able to earn a scholarship and complete a Bachelor of Music degree at the University of Adelaide's Elder Conservatorium in 1969, where his teachers included Peter Maxwell Davies (then composer-in-residence), Sándor Veress and Richard Meale. During vacations he worked as assistant to Peter Sculthorpe, gaining valuable insight into the working life of a composer. A further Commonwealth Scholarship enabled Edwards to complete his studies with Peter Maxwell Davies in London in 1970, earning a Master of Music degree, after which he spent 18 months composing at a remote Yorkshire farmhouse. Today, Edwards holds higher doctorates from the Universities of Sydney and Adelaide.

Returning to Sydney in 1970, Edwards taught in the Music Department of Sydney University and in 1974 married Helen Hopkins, one of his students. In the same year he became a lecturer in the Sydney Conservatorium's School of Composition, remaining there until 1980, when he began working as a freelance composer and lecturer. Working from their home in the coastal village of Pearl Beach, Edwards and his wife Helen, a piano teacher, led an idyllic and productive life until the education of their two children necessitated moving back to Sydney in 1984.

== Musical career ==
Reclusive by nature, Ross Edwards has largely eschewed following a career path as such, neglecting to promote his work and responding mainly to the inner dictates of his vocation. Based in Sydney and often retreating to work in the Blue Mountains west of the city, he has an acute sense of place and belonging, claiming to draw on his experience as "a composer living and working in Australia and relating to the world from an Australian perspective." Far from being isolationist, however, the surface of Edwards' music is often highly eclectic, making oblique references to many cultures in what he describes as an "intuitive search for unity within diversity". He has also stated that underlying all his music "the natural environment remains the supreme generative force".

In spite of his natural reticence, Edwards' works have been featured at such international music festivals as the Vale of Glamorgan Festival, Wales; the Edinburgh International Festival; the Australian Festival of Chamber Music, Townsville; the Mostly Mozart Festival, New York; the City of London Festival; the Darwin International Guitar Festival; the Canberra International Music Festival; the Adelaide Festival; the Melbourne Festival; the Tucson Winter Chamber Music Festival, Arizona; International Society for Contemporary Music Festivals in Stockholm, Basel, Warsaw and Sydney; and the Festivals of Sydney and Perth.

=== Significant events ===
Significant events include the award of a joint Australian Broadcasting Corporation/Australian Bicentennial commission to compose the violin concerto Maninyas (1988); the Australia Council's Don Banks Music Award (1989); Australian Creative "Keating" Fellowships in 1990 and 1995; and award of the Order of Australia – AM (1997). The composition of Dawn Mantras, Sydney's contribution to the millennium celebrations, was telecast worldwide to an audience of billions, attracting great international acclaim. In 2007 he was Musica Viva Australia's Featured Composer.

=== Collaborations ===
In 2005, Edwards' oboe concerto Bird Spirit Dreaming, originally composed for oboist Diana Doherty and the Sydney Symphony Orchestra, had its US premiere by Doherty, the New York Philharmonic and Lorin Maazel, after which it was toured worldwide and received enthusiastically. Another notable success was the 2010 UK premiere of the violin concerto Maninyas, given at the 2010 Edinburgh International Festival by its dedicatee, Dene Olding, the Sydney Symphony Orchestra and Vladimir Ashkenazy. This work has also gained international popularity through choreography for dance, notably by Stanton Welch for the San Francisco Ballet. Another Welch/Edwards collaboration, the ballet Zodiac, was successfully premiered by the Houston Ballet in 2015. Edwards' music, with its unique rhythms, has a natural affinity with dance.

Another important collaboration with Australian saxophonist Amy Dickson, who now lives in London has produced three new works: the saxophone concerto Full Moon Dances (2012); the double concerto Frog and Star Cycle, for whose 2016 premiere Dickson was paired with the Scottish percussionist Colin Currie and accompanied by the Sydney Symphony Orchestra; and Bright Birds and Sorrows, which Dickson premiered at the 2017 Musica Viva Festival in Sydney with the Elias String Quartet, visiting from the UK.

== Musical style and philosophy ==
=== Early period: the influence of the natural world ===
In the early 1970s Edwards experienced an unexpected crisis. Disenchanted by the European music of the time, which was itself in crisis due to the waning of the Modernist movement, he found himself unable to compose for several years. Having returned to Australia due to the terminal illness of his mother, and while lecturing at the Sydney Conservatorium, he moved in 1974 with his wife and infant son to the village of Pearl Beach, north of Sydney, where his sister-in-law had a holiday house. Pearl Beach, which adjoined the Brisbane Water National Park "buzzing with wildlife", had an immediate effect on him and his work. "The summer days were swathed in the drones of cicadas with their mysteriously abrupt starts and stops and, at evening, the insects would start up. I was entranced by the insect chorus because it seemed to be on the verge of conveying some profound message which was ultimately elusive. All the temporal relationships in my music – the relative lengths of phrases and sections – are influenced by these ancient voices, whose near-symmetries and inconsistently varied repetitions often seem close to our inherited musical syntax. I don’t doubt that, over the millennia, such voices have generated much of the world’s music and it’s not hard to detect their presence in various surviving folk and religious traditions".

=== Austerity and contemplation: the Sacred Series and beyond ===
The result of Edwards' move to Pearl Beach was a leap from the fierce complexity of some of his earlier work to a series of austere, meditative compositions (e.g., Tower of Remoteness (1978) and Etymalong (1984)), which became known as his Sacred Series, based on close listening to and absorption of the complex sound of the natural environment combined with his reading of Zen texts and commentaries.

To Edwards' surprise, these skeletal compositions "found favour with the apostles of Orthodox Modernism," unaware that their position was being quietly subverted. It became vividly apparent, however, when, in 1982, his Piano Concerto burst upon the scene. "Some other pieces I wrote in the 1980s, however, ruffled establishment feathers both here and abroad and all but destroyed my reputation as a so-called serious composer. The most notorious example is, without doubt, my Piano Concerto, composed in Pearl Beach in 1982. My original intention for this work was to compose something … stark and introspective, but some unseen force seemed to dictate otherwise. In what seemed like a moment of sheer revelation, the outside world burst in on me and I suddenly became aware that I had the extraordinary privilege of living in a paradise of sun-blessed ocean and joyously shrieking parrots gyrating in the warm air, and that this ecstasy simply had to be transmitted through music. Conformist critics, especially English ones, gave me hell but, fortunately, the public responded positively, and this remains one of my most popular pieces."

What followed was a process of integrating extreme positions – of gradually developing a musical language that spoke both to Edwards himself and, through him, to those prepared to listen. In the 1980s, the response to his music began to gain momentum, divided between the enthusiasm of those who perceived it as fresh direction – "a statement of independence from the impetus of cultural globalism" – and those who saw it as "a betrayal of Modernist idealism". Edwards largely stayed aloof from these so-called "style wars", seeking his own instinctual voice in the midst of controversy.

=== The Maninya style: the dance of nature ===
Throughout the 1980s, the shapes, rhythms and temporal relationships Edwards subconsciously gleaned from walking in the Brisbane Water National Park began increasingly to inform the structure and texture of his music, which took on the character of angular, animated chant, with subtly varied repetition of rhythmic cells over elaborated drones. This "dance-chant", as he called it, sometimes mistakenly aligned with the minimalist movement, was closely examined by Paul Stanhope, who claimed that it suggested ritualistic behaviour. Edwards' description of it as his maninya style originates from a spontaneously conceived nonsense text which he set to music in Maninya I (1986), and which was to spawn a series of maninya pieces culminating in the Maninyas violin concerto of 1988. While its quirky rhythms and chirpy, pentatonic melodic shapes are antithetical to the austere spiritual quietude of the sacred series, the maninya style also has its origin in nature, bringing the drones of insects and cicadas, the calls of birds and the mysterious temporal proportions into the concert hall. Edwards also notes that he had become fascinated by the music of the Sufis and the African mbira, and that these may have been influential. From this time, Edwards' language, though firmly rooted in the Australian bush, begins to look outward and bear traces of an eclectic attitude to come. The maninya style has persisted throughout his work, as has the sacred, each increasingly infiltrated by symbols from and references to other cultures which preserve a reverence for the Earth.

Whereas Edwards' early maninya pieces tended to be static, ritualistic blocks of sound, Edwards began in the 1990s a series under the generic title "enyato", also extracted from the 1981 nonsense poem and given to connote "contrast". The enyato pieces are typically in two-movement form, the first slow, introductory; the second lively, dance-like. Examples are Prelude and Dragonfly Dance (1991) for percussion ensemble, and Blackwattle Caprices (1998), for solo guitar. In his study, Beyond Sacred and Maninyas, Philip Cooney maintains that these pieces may be seen as move towards a fusion of opposites, a steady progression towards the world of the later symphonies and concerti, where Edwards has been concerned with achieving greater richness and breadth.

=== Diversity and eclecticism ===
Since the turn of the 21st century, Edwards' music, especially in his diverse larger scale works, has begun to integrate the many consistent elements of his earlier work – ranging from childlike simplicity, embellished Eastern pentatonicism, medieval Western modality, fragments of plainchant, occasional outbursts of expressionistic angst, complex textures which include the development of motives and Western counterpoint, Eastern heterophony, and a deep spiritual dimension with both Eastern and Western overtones. There are allusions to indigenous music but not direct quotations: where the didjeridu occurs its function has always been discussed between composer and performer. To these he has often added theatre and ritual, costume, lighting and dance, most manifest in such orchestral works as Bird Spirit Dreaming (2002), Full Moon Dances (2012) and Frog and Star Cycle (2015). Cultural symbols such as the Virgin Mary and her Eastern equivalent, Guanyin, goddess of compassion, make frequent appearance in the guise of the Earth Mother, protector and nurturer of the environment – Edwards' work has always had a strongly ecological focus. Behind the vivid surface activity however, the mysterious Australian bush is always present as a constant backdrop, providing unity and coherence.

In the 1970s, Edwards' attunement to the sounds of nature in a mindful, meditative way had a powerful effect on his music. He came to regard the sacred pieces as sonic contemplation objects similar to the honkyoku repertoire of the Japanese shakuhachi. Years later he re-established contact with Dr Graham Williams, a friend from student days, who had given up his career as a pianist to train as a meditation teacher in the Burmese and Tibetan traditions. Williams who, as director of the Lifeflow Meditation Centre in Adelaide and was developing a uniquely Australian form of meditation, perceived that all of Edwards' music possessed a quality that naturally induced a meditative state.

== List of works ==
=== Orchestral ===
- Mountain Village in a Clearing Mist (1972)
- Veni Creator Spiritus for string orchestra (1993)
- Chorale and Ecstatic Dance for string orchestra (1994)
- Chorale and Ecstatic Dance for full orchestra (1995)
- White Ghost Dancing (1999, rev. 2007)
- Emerald Crossing (1999)
- Entwinings, for string orchestra (2016)
- Dances of Life and Death, for wind orchestra (2017)

==== Symphonies ====
- Symphony No. 1 "Da Pacem Domine" (1991)
- Symphony No. 2 "Earth Spirit Songs" (1996–97)
- Symphony No. 3 "Mater Magna" (1998–2000)
- Symphony No. 4 "Star Chant" (2001)
- Symphony No. 5 "The Promised Land" (2005)

==== Concertos ====
- Concerto for Piano and Orchestra (1982)
- Maninyas, Concerto for Violin and Orchestra (1981–88)
- Arafura Dances, Concerto for Guitar and String Orchestra (1995)
- Bird Spirit Dreaming, Concerto for Oboe and Orchestra (2002)
- Concerto for Clarinet and Orchestra (2007)
- Full Moon Dances, Concerto for Saxophone and Orchestra (2011)
- Frog and Star Cycle, Double Concerto for Saxophone and Percussion (2015)

==== Other orchestral works with soloist ====
- Yarrageh, Nocturne for Percussion and Orchestra (1989)
- The Heart of Night for shakuhachi and orchestra (2004–5)
- Spirit Ground for violin and orchestra (2010)

=== Vocal ===
- The Hermit of Green Light – Four Poems of Michael Dransfield (1979)
- Maninya I (1981)
- Maninya V (1986)
- Maninya VI (1995)
- Christina’s Lullaby (2010)
- Five Senses – Five Poems of Judith Wright (2012)

=== Choral ===
- Five Carols from Quem Quaeritis (1967)
- Eternity (1973)
- Ab Estatis Foribus (1980)
- Flower Songs (1986–7)
- Dance Mantras (1992)
- Dawn Mantras (1999)
- Dawn Canticle (2000)
- Mountain Chant – Three Sacred Choruses (2002–3)
- Southern Cross Chants (2004)
- Mantras and Alleluyas (2007)
- Mass of the Dreaming (2009)
- Sacred Kingfisher Psalms (2009)
- Miracles (2014)

=== Opera, dance and music theatre ===
- Christina's World, chamber opera to libretto by Dorothy Hewett (1983)
- Sensing, dance video with Graeme Murphy and the Sydney Dance Company (1992)
- Maninyas – ballet to Edwards' violin concerto Maninyas choreographed by Stanton Welch for the San Francisco Ballet (1996)
- The Cries of Australia, with Barry Humphries (1997)
- Koto Dreaming for the 2003 Asian Music and Dance Festival, Sydney
- To the Green Island, orchestral score for Nicolo Fonte's ballet The Possibility Space for The Australian Ballet (2008)
- Zodiac, orchestral score choreographed by Stanton Welch for the Houston Ballet (2015)

=== Instrumental music ===
- Bagatelle, for oboe and piano (1968)
- Monos I, for solo cello (1970)
- The Tower of Remoteness, for clarinet and piano (1978)
- Marimba Dances (1982)
- Ten Little Duets for treble instruments (1982)
- Ecstatic Dances, for two flutes or flute and clarinet (1990)
- Ecstatic Dance, arranged for two woodwinds or two strings
- Prelude and White Cockatoo Spirit Dance (Enyato II), for solo violin or solo viola (1993)
- Ulpirra, for a solo woodwind (1993)
- Guitar Dances, for solo guitar, arr. Adrian Walter (1994)
- Four Bagatelles for oboe and clarinet (1994)
- Enyato IV, for bass clarinet and marimba (1995)
- Raft Song at Sunrise, for solo shakuhachi (1995)
- Binyang, for clarinet and percussion (1996)
- Blackwattle Caprices, for solo guitar (1998)
- Two Pieces for Solo Oboe, 1. Yanada, 2. Ulpirra (1998)
- Djanaba, for guitar and marimba, also arr. for two guitars (2002)
- Prelude and Laughing Rock, for solo cello (1993–2003)
- Water Spirit Song, from Koto Dreaming, for solo cello and various solo woodwinds (2003)
- More Marimba Dances (2004)
- Two pieces for Organ (2004)
- Nura, sonata for flute and piano (2004)
- The Harp and the Moon, for solo harp (2008)
- Mystic Spring – Songs and Dances for a Treble Woodwind (2009)
- Exile, for violin and piano (2010)
- Melbourne Arioso for solo guitar (2016)

=== Keyboard music ===
- Monos II, for solo piano (1970)
- Five Little Piano Pieces (1976)
- Kumari, for solo piano (1980)
- Three Little Piano Pieces for the Right Hand Alone (1983)
- Etymalong, for solo piano (1984)
- Three Children’s Pieces, 1. Fipsis, 2. Gamelan, 3. Emily's Song (1983)
- Pond Light Mantras for two pianos (1991)
- Three Australian Waltzes, 1. Sassafras Gully Waltz, 3. Sandy Stone's Waltz (1997–8)
- A Flight of Sunbirds – Nine Bagatelles for Four Hands (2001)
- Mantras and Night Flowers, 9 bagatelles for solo piano (2001)
- Two Pieces for Organ (2004)
- Piano Sonata (2011)
- Bird Morning, for two pianos and didjeridu (2015)
- Sea Star Fantasy, piano solo (2015)
- Lake Dreaming, for two pianos (2017)

=== Ensemble music ===
- Laikan, sextet for flute, clarinet, percussion, piano violin and cello (1979)
- Maninya II, for string quartet (1982). Withdrawn and partly incorporated into String Quartet No. 3 (see below).
- Reflections, sextet for piano and percussion (1985).
- Maninya III, for wind quintet (1985), later incorporated into Incantations (see below)
- Prelude and Dragonfly Dance, for percussion quartet (1991)
- Chorale and Ecstatic Dance, for string quartet. Also known as Enyato I. (1993)
- Veni Creator Spiritus for double string quartet (1993)
- Arafura Dances, arranged for harp and string quartet (1995)
- Tyalgum Mantras, for variable ensemble (1999).
- Piano Trio (1999)
- Emerald Crossing, for piano quartet (1999). Later incorporated into Piano Quartet (see below).
- Dawn Mantras, for shakuhachi, tenor saxophone (or cor anglais), didjeridu, percussion, child soprano, children's choir, men's choir. (1999)
- Enyato V, for flute, guitar, percussion, violin and cello (2001)
- Island Landfall, for flute, clarinet, piano, 2 violins, viola and cello (2003)
- Incantations, for wind quintet (2006)
- String Quartet No. 1 "Sparks and Auras" (2006, revised 2009)
- String Quartet No. 2 "Shekina Fantasy" (2008, revised 2010)
- String Quartet No. 3 "Summer Dances" (2012)
- Gallipoli, for string quartet (2014)
- Animisms, suite for flute, clarinet, percussion, violin and cello (2014)
- Bright Birds and Sorrows, suite for soprano saxophone and string quartet (2015)
- Voice of the Rain, for shakuhachi and string quartet (2016)
- Piano Quartet (2017)

== Awards, nominations and accolades ==
=== APRA-AMC Art Music Awards ===
The APRA-AMC Art Music Awards (previously Classical Music Awards) are presented annually by Australasian Performing Right Association (APRA) and Australian Music Centre (AMC) since 2002. They "honour the achievements of composers, performers and industry specialists in the contemporary classical genre."

| Year | Nominee / work | Award | Result |
|---|---|---|---|
| 2003 | Concerto for Oboe and Orchestra (Edwards) – Diana Doherty | Best Performance of an Australian Composition | Won |
| 2003 | Song for Emily (Edwards) – 200 Guitar Duo | Instrumental Work of the Year | Nominated |
| 2005 | Concerto for Guitar and Strings (Ross Edwards) – Karin Schaupp, Tasmanian Symphony Orchestra, Richard Mills (conductor) | Orchestral Work of the Year | Won |
| 2006 | Oboe Concerto (Edwards) – Diana Doherty, Melbourne Symphony Orchestra | Orchestral Work of the Year | Nominated |
| 2007 | Piano Trio (Edwards) – The Australian Trio | Instrumental Work of the Year | Won |
| 2008 | Symphony No. 4 "Star Chant" (Edwards, Fred Watson) – Adelaide Symphony Orchestra, Richard Mills (conductor); Adelaide Chamber Singers, Carl Crossin (director); Adelaide Philharmonia Chorus, Timothy Sexton (director) | Vocal or Choral Work of the Year | Won |
| 2008 | More Marimba Dances (Edwards) | Instrumental Work of the Year | Nominated |
| 2011 | Kalkadunga Man (William Barton, Edwards, Sarah Hopkins, Rosalind Page, Dan Walker) – The Song Company, William Barton (soloist) | Performance of the Year | Nominated |
| 2011 | Joan Sutherland Performing Arts Centre – Composer-in-Focus 2010 with Ross Edwards | Award for Excellence in Music Education | Won |
| 2012 | Spirit Ground (Edwards) – West Australian Symphony Orchestra, Margaret Blades (soloist) | Work of the Year – Orchestral | Nominated |
| 2012 | Sacred Kingfisher Psalms (Edwards) – The Song Company | Work of the Year – Vocal or Choral | Nominated |
| 2013 | Full Moon Dances (Edwards) – Sydney Symphony, Miguel Harth-Bedoya (conductor), Amy Dickson (saxophone) | Work of the Year – Orchestral | Nominated |
| 2015 | Ross Edwards – Contribution to Australian chamber music | Award for Excellence by an Individual | Won |

In 2009, ABC Classic FM conducted a listener survey of favourite symphonies entitled Classic 100 Symphony. Australian composers were voted in three positions of the top 100; Edwards' Symphony No. 1 Da pacem Domine was placed at number 67.

In 2011, ABC Classic FM conducted a listener survey of favourite work of the 20th century entitled Classic 100 Twentieth Century. Australian composers were voted in eight positions of the top 100; Two of Edwards' works appeared: Violin Concerto Maninyas (number 45) and Dawn Mantras (number 49).

In 2016 Ross Edwards was awarded the David Harold Tribe Symphony Award for Frog and Star Cycle, Double Concerto for Saxophone and Percussion.

=== Don Banks Music Award ===
The Don Banks Music Award was established in 1984 to publicly honour a senior artist of high distinction who has made an outstanding and sustained contribution to music in Australia. It was founded by the Australia Council in honour of Don Banks, Australian composer, performer and the first chair of its music board.

| Year | Nominee / work | Award | Result |
|---|---|---|---|
| 1989 | Ross Edwards | Don Banks Music Award | Won |

== Personal life ==
Ross Edwards married Helen Hopkins, one of his students, in 1974. She is currently his manager, having spent many years as a piano teacher, and has always been a committed supporter of his work. They have two children, Jeremy and Emily.
