= Doorways of My Mind =

Live album by Lior
- Released: 6 February 2006
- Recorded: 23–24 November 2005
- Venue: Northcote Social Club, Northcote, Victoria
- Length: 46:41
- Label: Senso Unico
- Producer: François Tétaz

Lior chronology
Autumn Flow (2004)	Doorways of My Mind (2006)	Corner of an Endless Road (2008)

Doorways of My Mind (subtitled Live at NSC) is the first live album by Australian singer-songwriter Lior. The album was recorded at the Northcote Social Club during the Autumn Flow album tour in November 2005. The album was released in February 2006.

At the ARIA Music Awards of 2006, the album was nominated for two awards; Best Blues & Roots Album and Best Independent Release.

== Track listing ==
1. "Daniel" – 3:59
2. "Sitting with a Stranger" – 4:25
3. "Gypsy Girl" – 3:12
4. "Grey Ocean" – 4:53
5. "Building Ships" – 4:41
6. "Autumn Flow" – 4:47
7. "Bedouin Song" – 3:32
8. "Diego & the Village Girl" – 5:12
9. "Avinu Malkeinu" – 1:34
10. "Burying Chances" – 5:58
11. "This Old Love" – 4:28

== Personnel ==
- Lior – vocals, guitar
- Brett Hirst – bass
- Michelle Wood – cello
- Michael Iveson – drums, backing vocals
- Ben Fink – electric guitar, backing vocals
- James Wilkinson – trombone
- Reuben Zylberszpic – trumpet
- Charlotte Armstrong – violin
- Lerida Delbridge – violin

== Charts ==
Chart performance for Doorways of My Mind
Chart (2006)	Peak position
Australian Albums (ARIA)	98

== Release history ==
Release history and formats for Doorways of My Mind
Region	Date	Format	Label	Catalogue
Australia	6 February 2006	CD; digital download	Senso Unico	SENSOCD666
