= Brett Kelly =

Brett Kelly may refer to:

- Brett Kelly (actor) (born 1993), Canadian actor
- Brett Kelly (conductor), Australian conductor and trombonist
- Brett Kelly (rugby league) (born 1983), Australian rugby league player
- Brett Kelly (businessman), Australian businessman, author, and entrepreneur
