= Miss Perú 1980 =

- Date: June 10, 1980
- Presenters: Luis Ángel Pinasco, Sonia Oquendo
- Venue: Teatro Municipal, Lima
- Broadcaster: Panamericana Televisión
- Entrants: 16
- Winner: Lisset Ramis; Huánuco

The Miss Perú 1980 pageant was held on June 10, 1980. That year, 16 candidates were competing for the national crown. The chosen winners represented Peru at the Miss Universe 1980 and Miss World 1980. The rest of the finalists would enter in different pageants.

== Placements ==
Final Results	Contestant
Miss Peru Universe 1980	Huánuco - Lisseth Ramis
Miss World Peru 1980	Cuzco - Roxana Vega
Miss Peru Playa 1980	Region Lima - Diana Quijano
Miss Maja Peru 1980	Piura - Cristina Boza Pardo
Top 8	Amazonas - Jeanette Vergara; Europe Perú - Nancy Brescia Scavia; Tacna - Mónica Moreno Guerra; Apurímac - Sandra Calisto

== Special awards ==
- Best Regional Costume - Lambayeque - Paulina Muro
- Best Hair - Amazonas - Jeanette Vergara
- Miss Photogenic - San Martín - Ana Ramírez Rengifo
- Miss Body - Cuzco - Roxana Vega
- Miss Elegance - Region Lima - Diana Quijano

.

== Delegates ==
- Amazonas - Jeanette Vergara
- Arequipa - Rosella Concha Fernández
- Apurímac - Sandra Calisto
- Cuzco - Roxana Vega
- Distrito Capital - Alicia Tillit
- Europe Perú - Nancy Brescia Scavia
- Huánuco - Lisseth Ramis
- La Libertad - Patricia Benavides
- Lambayeque - Paulina Muro
- Loreto - Patricia Pedraz
- Piura - Cristina Boza Pardo
- Region Lima - Diana Quijano
- San Martín - Anita Ramírez Rengifo
- Tacna - Mónica Moreno Guerra
- Ucayali - Milena Aguirre Roca
- USA Peru - Carla Barila
