= Nigel Westlake =

Australian composer and conductor

- Born: 6 September 1958 (age 68); Perth, Western Australia
- Genres: Jazz music; classic
- Occupations: Composer; Conductor
- Years active: 1978–present

Nigel Westlake (born 6 September 1958) is an Australian composer, musician and conductor. As a composer for the screen, his film credits include the feature films Ali's Wedding, Paper Planes, Miss Potter, Babe and its sequel Babe: Pig in the City, Children of the Revolution, Blueback and The Nugget. He also composed the theme for SBS World News.

== Biography ==
Westlake was born in Sydney, the son of Sydney Symphony Orchestra principal clarinettist Donald Westlake.

Westlake studied the clarinet with his father and subsequently left school early to pursue a performance career in music.

By the age of 17, Westlake was touring Australia and the world, performing as a freelance clarinettist, bass clarinettist and saxophonist with ballet companies, a circus troupe, chamber music ensembles, fusion bands and orchestras.

In 1983, Westlake studied bass clarinet and composition in the Netherlands and was appointed composer in residence for ABC Radio National in 1984.

From 1987 to 1992 Westlake was resident clarinettist with The Australia Ensemble, and went on to join guitarist John Williams' group Attacca.

In 2008, Westlake founded the Smugglers of Light Foundation in memory of his son Eli, to promote cultural awareness and empowerment through music and film in youth and Indigenous Australian communities.

== Personal life ==
Westlake is married to Jan Loquet Westlake, and together, they had two sons. Their son Eli was killed in a road rage incident on 7 June 2008, at age 21. Westlake composed Missa Solis - Requiem for Eli and dedicated it to Eli. It was premiered by the Melbourne Symphony Orchestra at the Myer Music Bowl in February 2011.

== Filmography ==
- Candy Regentag (1989)
- Act of Necessity (1991)
- Antarctica (1991)
- Backsliding (1991)
- Babe (1995)
- Children of the Revolution (1996)
- Wild Australia: The Edge (1996)
- Babe: Pig in the City (1998)
- A Little Bit of Soul (1998)
- Solarmax (2000)
- The Nugget (2002)
- Horseplay (2003)
- Hell Has Harbour Views (2005)
- Miss Potter (2006)
- Stepfather of the Bride (2006)
- Paper Planes (2015)
- Ali's Wedding (and soundtrack) (2017)
- Blueback (2022)

== Awards and nominations ==
- In 1985: Westlake won Jazz Action Society Composition Competition.
- In 1988: Westlake won Gold Medal at the New York International Radio Festival.
- In 2004, Westlake was awarded the HC Coombs Creative Arts Fellowship at the Australian National University.
- In 2012, Westlake received an Honorary Doctorate of Music from the University of New South Wales.

=== Australian Academy of Cinema and Television Arts (AACTA) Awards ===
- 2015 - AACTA Award Best Original Music Score - Paper Planes - nominated
- 2017 - AACTA Award Best Original Score - Ali's Wedding - nominated

=== AIR Awards ===
The Australian Independent Record Awards (commonly known informally as AIR Awards) is an annual awards night to recognise, promote and celebrate the success of Australia's Independent Music sector.

Year	Nominee / work	Award	Result	Ref.
2023	Blueback (Original Motion Picture Score) (with Melbourne Symphony Orchestra and Benjamin Northey)	Best Independent Classical Album or EP	Nominated	

=== APRA Awards ===
The APRA Awards are held in Australia and New Zealand by the Australasian Performing Right Association to recognise songwriting skills, sales and airplay performance by its members annually.

Year	Nominee / work	Award	Result	Ref.
1992	"Refractions at Summer Cloud Bay"	Contemporary Classical Composition of the Year	Won	
1996	Babe	Best Film Score	Won	
1998	The Edge	Most Performed Classical Work	Won	
1998	Songs from the Forest	Most Performed Classical Work	Nominated	
1999	Babe: Pig in the City	Best Film Score	Nominated	
1999	"Laikan" (Australia Ensemble)	Most Performed Contemporary Classical Composition	Won	
2003	Horse Play	Best Feature Film Score	Nominated	
2003	The Nugget	Best Feature Film Score	Won	
2005	Piano Concerto – Michael Kieran Harvey	Best Performance of an Australian Composition	Nominated	
2005	Six Fish – Saffire Guitar Quartet	Instrumental Work of the Year	Won	
2005	Crystal Spheres – Solarmax film orchestra	Orchestral Work of the Year	Nominated	
2005	Hell Has Harbour Views	Best Music for a Mini-Series or Telemovie	Won	
2007	When the Clock Strikes Me - Rebecca Lagos (soloist), Sydney Symphony	Best Performance of an Australian Composition	Won	
2007	Miss Potter	Feature Film Score of the Year	Won	
2007	Miss Potter	Best Soundtrack Album	Won	
2007	Stepfather of the Bride	Best Music for a Mini-Series or Telemovie	Won	
2008	Rare Sugar - The Australia Ensemble and Catherine McCorkill (clarinetist)	Best Performance of an Australian Composition	Won	
2008	Glass Soldier Suite – Melbourne Symphony Orchestra, Geoffrey Payne (cornet), Jean-Louis Forestier (conductor)	Orchestral Work of the Year	Nominated	
2012	Missa Solis – Requiem for Eli (with Sydney Symphony Orchestra)	Work of the Year – Orchestral	Won	
2012	Missa Solis – Requiem for Eli (with Sydney Symphony Orchestra)	Performance of the Year	Nominated	
2014	Compassion (with Lior & Sydney Symphony Orchestra)	Work of the Year – Orchestral	Nominated	

=== ARIA Music Awards ===
The ARIA Music Awards is an annual awards ceremony that recognises excellence, innovation, and achievement across all genres of Australian music. They commenced in 1987.

Year	Nominee / work	Award	Result	Ref.
1991	Roads to Xanadu - The Genius That Was China (with Michael Askill)	Best Original Soundtrack or Musical Theatre Cast Album	Nominated	
1993	Antarctica	Best Original Soundtrack or Musical Theatre Cast Album	Nominated	
1996	Babe	Best Original Soundtrack or Musical Theatre Cast Album	Nominated	
2013	Missa Solis: Requiem for Eli (with Melbourne Symphony Orchestra)	Best Classical Album	Nominated	
2014	Compassion (with Lior and Sydney Symphony Orchestra)	Best Classical Album	Won	
2015	Paper Planes – Original Motion Picture Soundtrack (with Melbourne Symphony Orchestra)	Best Original Soundtrack or Musical Theatre Cast Album	Nominated	
2017	Ali's Wedding (soundtrack) (with Sydney Symphony Orchestra, Lior, Joseph Tawadros & Slava Grigoryan)	Best Original Soundtrack or Musical Theatre Cast Album	Won	
2019	Nigel Westlake: Spirit of the Wild / Steve Reich: The Desert Music (with Diana Doherty, Sydney Symphony Orchestra & David Robertson, Synergy Vocals)	Best Classical Album	Nominated	
2023	Blueback – Original Motion Picture Soundtrack (with Melbourne Symphony Orchestra and Benjamin Northey)	Best Original Soundtrack, Cast or Show Album	Nominated	

=== Film Critics Circle of Australia Awards ===
- 2018 - Best Original Music - Ali's Wedding - Nominee
- 2016 - Best Music - Paper Planes - Nominee
- 1997 - Best Original Music - Babe - Won

=== International Film Music Critics Award (IFMCA) ===
- 2007 - Best Original Score for a Comedy Film - Miss Potter
