= José Carbó =

Australian opera singer

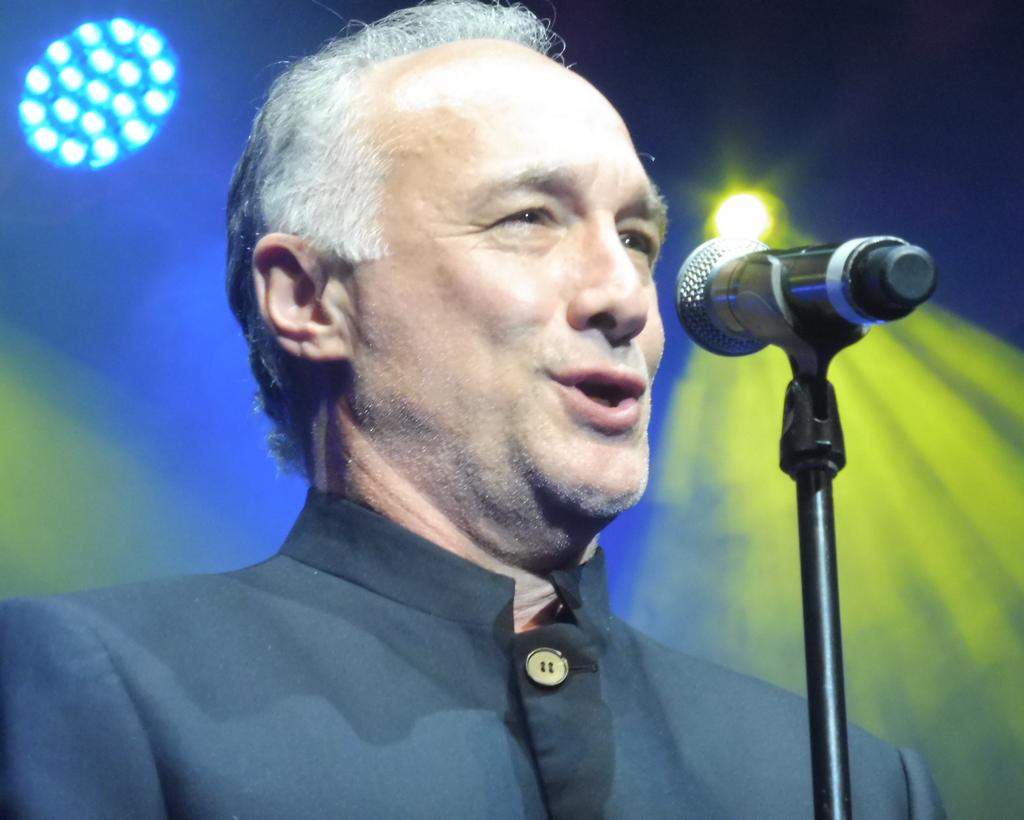
José Carbó, 2025

José Carbó is an Argentinian-Australian opera baritone. He has performed nationally and internationally for Opera Australia, the Sydney Symphony Orchestra and the Metropolitan Opera.

Carbó worked with Slava and Leonard Grigoryan to produce an album titled My Latin Heart. It was nominated for the 2012 ARIA Music Awards for Best Classical Album. The trio then embarked on a tour also titled My Latin Heart featuring music from the album.

Along with classical guitarists Andrew Blanch and Ariel Nurhadi he formed the José Carbó Trio who first performed in 2015.

== Discography ==
=== Albums ===
List of albums, with selected details
Title	Details
My Latin Heart (with Slava and Leonard Grigoryan)	Released: May 2012; Format:CD; Label:ABC Classics

== Awards and nominations ==
In 2004, Carbó won the Australian Singing Competition's Opera Award. He received a Helpmann Award for Best Male Performer in a Supporting Role in an Opera for Opera Australia's Die tote Stadt in 2013.

=== ARIA Music Awards ===
The ARIA Music Awards is an annual awards ceremony that recognises excellence, innovation, and achievement across all genres of Australian music. They commenced in 1987.

Year	Nominee / work	Award	Result	Ref.
2012	My Latin Heart (with Slava and Leonard Grigoryan)	Best Classical Album	Nominated	
