= Corner of an Endless Road =

Studio album by Lior
- Released: 12 February 2008
- Recorded: 2007
- Studio: Sing Sing Studios, Platinum, ABC Southbank, Hot House, Audrey, New Market, and Moose Studios; Melbourne, Australia. Sonora Recorders, Los Angeles, US.
- Label: Senso Unico
- Producer: François Tétaz

Lior chronology
Doorways of My Mind (2006)	Corner of an Endless Road (2008)	Tumbling into the Dawn (2010)

Corner of an Endless Road is the second studio album by Australian independent singer-songwriter, Lior. The album was released in February 2008 and peaked at number 13 on the ARIA Charts.

At the ARIA Music Awards of 2008, the album was nominated for Best Independent Release and Best Blues & Roots Album.

== Reception ==
JB HiFi reviewer said "The songs on Lior's second album Corner of an Endless Road are intensely personal and candid. They represent landmarks in the emotional journey throughout the last two years of Lior's career and life. Lior worked closely with producer François Tétaz at matching the emotional range of the songs with musical choices that intimately represent who he is, as a musician and a person.... Corner of an Endless Road is a true representation of Lior's musical landscape."

Bernard Zuel from Sydney Morning Herald said the songs are "pretty low key (with) the main component being pop with a decidedly late '60s-early '70s Paul McCartney feel."

== Track listing ==
- all tracks written by Lior, except track 1 (Lior, Joseph Tawadros and François Tétaz), track 2 (Lior and Ben Fink) and track 5 (Lior and Tétaz).
1. "April Bloom" – 4:09
2. "I'll Forget You" (featuring Sia). – 3:20
3. "Corner of an Endless Road" – 3:26
4. "Sleeping in the Rain" – 3:20
5. "Heal Me" – 4:15
6. "Lost in You" – 2:40
7. "Burst Your Bubble" – 3:22
8. "Sonja" – 2:49
9. "Jerusalem" – 4:15
10. "Take the Sting Out" – 3:00
11. "Safety of Distance" – 2:19

== Charts ==
Chart (2008)	Peak position
Australian Albums (ARIA)	13

== Release history ==
Region	Date	Format	Label	Catalogue
Australia	February 2008	CD; digital download	Senso Unico	SENSOCD888
