= Ali's Wedding (soundtrack) =

2017 soundtrack by Nigel Westlake

Soundtrack album to the film Ali's Wedding by Nigel Westlake, Sydney Symphony Orchestra with Joseph Tawadros, Slava Grigoryan and Lior
- Released: September 2017
- Length: 50:21
- Label: ABC Classics

Lior albums chronology
A Piece of Quiet (The Hush Collection, Vol 16) (2016)	Ali's Wedding (2017)	Between You and Me (2018)

Ali's Wedding (soundtrack) is the original motion picture soundtrack for the 2017 Australian romantic comedy of the same name starring Osamah Sami and Don Hany. The soundtrack is credited to Nigel Westlake, Sydney Symphony Orchestra with Joseph Tawadros, Slava Grigoryan and Lior and was released in September 2017.

In November 2017, at the ARIA Music Awards of 2017, the album won Best Original Soundtrack or Musical Theatre Cast Album.

In December 2017, at the 7th AACTA Awards the album was nominated for AACTA Award for Best Original Music Score.

== Track listing ==
1. "The Date Seed Parable" - 5:59
2. "Minaret in Moonlight" - 3:04
3. "Let the Journey Begin" - 3:19
4. "A Lie Begins in the Soul" - 1:48
5. "In Loving Memory" - 4:09
6. "As Fire Burns Through Wood" - 5:21
7. "The Tea Ceremony" - 2:57
8. "Train Station Wedding" - 4:58
9. "You Deserve to Be Loved" - 2:04
10. "This I Know" - 3:16
11. "I Want to Be the Son You Deserve" - 5:34
12. "The Rocket Will Launch" - 2:45
13. "The Streets of Basra" - 1:27
14. "Ma Wadani Ahadun/Until the End of Time" - 3:37

== Personnel ==
- Nigel Westlake - composer
- Slava Grigoryan - guitar
- Sydney Symphony Orchestra - Orchestra
- Joseph Tawadros - oud
- Lior - vocals

== Release history ==
Region	Date	Format	Label	Catalogue
Australia & New Zealand	September 2017	CD; digital download	ABC Classics	4815738
