= Autumn Flow =

Studio album by Lior
- Released: October 2004
- Recorded: 2004 at Big Jesus Burger Studios, Sydney
- Studios: Big Jesus Burger Studios, Sydney, Australia
- Genres: Roots, indie
- Length: 42:52
- Label: Senso Unico
- Producer: François Tétaz

Lior chronology
The Soul Suicide EP (2000)	Autumn Flow (2004)	Doorways of My Mind (2006)

Singles from Autumn Flow
- 1. "This Old Love" Released: 2004; 2. "Daniel" Released: 2004; 3. "Autumn Flow" Released: 2005

Autumn Flow is the debut studio album of Australian singer-songwriter Lior. The album was released in October 2004 and peaked at number 45 on the ARIA charts, early in 2005 and was certified gold in 2006.

At the J Award of 2005, the album was nominated for Australian Album of the Year.

At the ARIA Music Awards of 2005, the album was nominated for three awards; Breakthrough Artist, Best Male Artist, and Best Independent Release.

In June 2015, the album was re-released in celebration of its 10th anniversary, with 7 bonus tracks. About the re-release, Lior said "It wasn't actually my idea, a few people mentioned it to me and I was thinking no, I have to do this other thing. Then I stopped and realised it had been a pretty special 10 years and it was important to stop, reflect and celebrate, so I think it was a good opportunity to do that." Lior said "There's a beautiful innocence around the album and it still speaks to me in that way and I still very much connect to it."

== Reception ==
JB HiFi reviewer said "Lior's sound is a rootsy mix of styles that always harks back to the lyric and melody. The album itself is grounded in the late 60s / early 70s songwriter era, however the arrangements and production approach are quite contemporary. Artists such as Joni Mitchell, Paul Simon, Nick Drake and Rufus Wainwright are called to mind. It is Lior's voice that has drawn most attention, capable of both power and tenderness, always delivered with soul in its truest sense."

== Track listing ==
- all tracks written by Lior, except track 4 (Lior and François Tétaz) and track 10 (Lior, Brett Hirst, and Michael Iverson).
1. "This Old Love" – 3:04
2. "Daniel" – 3:50
3. "Gypsy Girl" – 3:10
4. "Superficial" – 3:52
5. "Autumn Flow" – 4:13
6. "Bedouin Song" – 3:09
7. "Sitting With a Stranger" – 3:15
8. "The Art of Cruelty" – 3:35
9. "Blessed" – 3:13
10. "Stuck In a War" – 3:18
11. "Building Ships" – 4:46
12. "Grey Ocean" – 3:36

2015 10th Anniversary Edition bonus disc

1. "Bedouin Song" (Demo) – 3:04
2. "Autumn Flow" (Demo) – 3:11
3. "The Art of Cruelty" (Demo) – 4:08
4. "Grey Ocean – 3:50
5. "Landslide" – 4:15
6. "Forro" – 3:39
7. "Satisfied Mind" – 3:48

== Charts ==
Chart (2004/05)	Peak position
Australian Albums (ARIA)	45

== Certifications ==
Region	Certification	Certified units/sales
Australia (ARIA)	Gold	35,000^{^}
^{^} Shipments figures based on certification alone.

== Release history ==
Region	Date	Format	Edition(s)	Label	Catalogue
Australia	October 2004	CD	Standard	Senso Unico	SENSOCD444
Australia	19 June 2015	CD; digital download	10th Anniversary Edition	Lior	
