= Helana Sawires =

Australian actress

Helana Sawires is an Australian actress best known for portraying the lead role of Dianne, a medical student, in the first Australian Muslim romantic comedy film, Ali's Wedding (2017). She also appeared in 2016 short film Banana Boy, directed by Steven Woodburn.

She lives in Marrickville where she grew up in a large Egyptian family with five siblings. She went to Sydney's Newtown High School of the Performing Arts. She is also a drummer and Egyptian tabla player.

Her role as Dianne in Ali's Wedding brought her a nomination for Best Actress at the Australian Academy of Cinema and Television Arts (AACTA) Awards.

== Filmography ==
=== Film ===
Year	Title	Role	Notes
2016	Banana Boy	Mother	
2017	Ali's Wedding	Dianne	Nominated – Australian Academy of Cinema and Television Arts

=== Television ===
Year	Title	Role	Notes
2020	Stateless	Rosna	Miniseries; 6 episodes
2021	Clickbait	Sasha	Miniseries; 8 episodes
2021	Fires	Nawra	Miniseries; 6 episodes
