= Gabriella Brum =

German-British model and beauty queen

- Born: March 22, 1962 (age 64); West Berlin, West Germany
- Beauty pageant titleholder
- Title: Miss Berlin 1980; Miss World Germany 1980; Miss World 1980
- Major competitions: Miss World 1980 (Winner; Resigned)

Gabriella Brum (born March 22, 1962) is a German-British former model and beauty queen who won Miss World 1980 and resigned 18 hours later, initially claiming her boyfriend disapproved. She stated that this was because of the pressure from the news media, though there were also allegations that she had posed nude in a magazine. The first runner-up in the pageant, Kimberley Santos from Guam, then assumed the title.

== Biography ==
Brum's mother, Angelika Roure, had met soldier, Edward Brum from London in 1961, but separated from him after a few years. The daughter, Gabriella Brum attended the Lessing High School in West Berlin from 1976 to 1980, but left school in favor of a desired film career. She worked under various pseudonyms and met acting director, cameraman and producer Wolfgang Benno Bellenbaum (1928-1984), with whom she went to Los Angeles where she worked as a model.

=== Miss Germany (1980) ===
On 26 June 1980, Brum was crowned Miss Germany at the International Congress Center (ICC) in West Berlin. A Time article from July 1980 shows that her election to Miss Germany met with criticism because Brum no longer lived in West Germany as her main residence.

=== Miss World (1980) ===
On 13 November 1980, Brum won the Miss World pageant in London, making her the second German to win the title, after Petra Schürmann. The runner-up was Kimberley Santos from Guam. The following day, Brum resigned on the grounds that her boyfriend disagreed with her new obligations and she "wanted to be with Benno instead of flying through the world under a strict contract for a year". Later, it was revealed she had been forced to resign because of allegations that there were nude photos of her. In a 2008 interview with Der Spiegel, photographer Wolfgang Heilemann said he had taken the photos of Brum naked in bed having a pillow fight with her boyfriend, as part of a Miss World cover story for Paris Match.

=== Living in the United States ===
In the early years, Brum was a successful model in the United States. She appeared in Playboy 5/1981.

In 1981, she married Wolfgang Benno Bellenbaum; they soon separated. Her husband shot himself at the age of 55 in his apartment in Encino, a district of Los Angeles, and his body was identified by Brum. A farewell letter was found.

An article on the January 2012 United States Online News (USSPost) indicated that she was still based in Los Angeles at the time.

== See also ==
- Miss Germany
