= Petra Schürmann =

German actress, presenter, and Miss World 1956 (1933–2010)

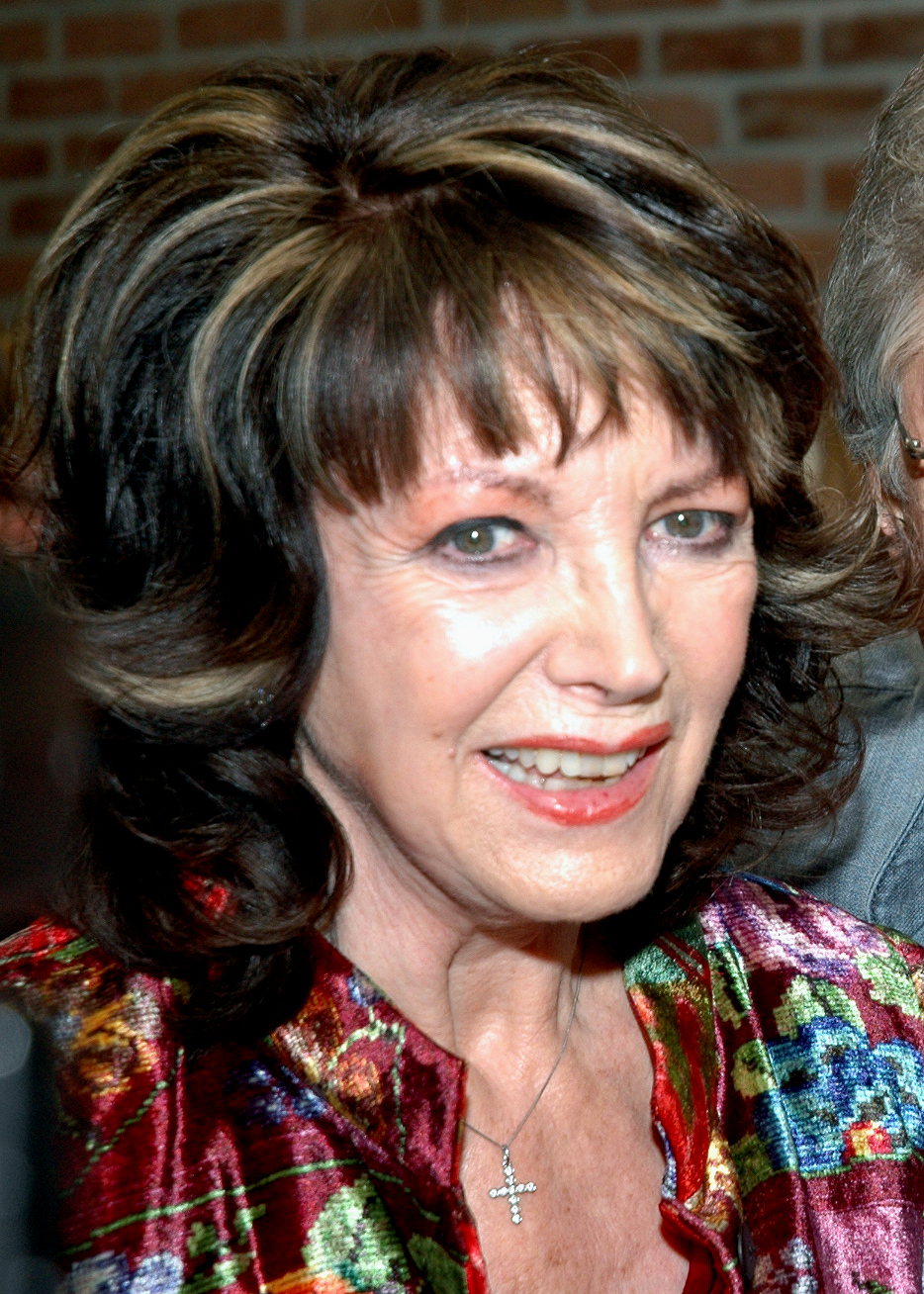
- Schürmann in 2004
- Born: Hildegard Petra Susanna Schürmann/ Petra Hildegard Elisabeth Schürmann; 15 September 1933; Mönchengladbach, Rhine Province, Germany
- Died: 14 January 2010 (aged 76); Starnberg, Germany
- Occupations: Actress, model, presenter, beauty queen
- Years active: 1954–2004
- Known for: Miss World 1956
- Spouse: Gerhard Freund (m. 1973; died 2008)

Petra Schürmann-Freund (German: [ˈpeːtʁa ˈʃyːɐ̯ˌman]; 15 September 1933 – 14 January 2010) was a German actress, model, TV announcer and beauty queen who won Miss World 1956.

== Biography ==
Schürmann as an announcer for the Bayerischer Rundfunk, in the 1960s

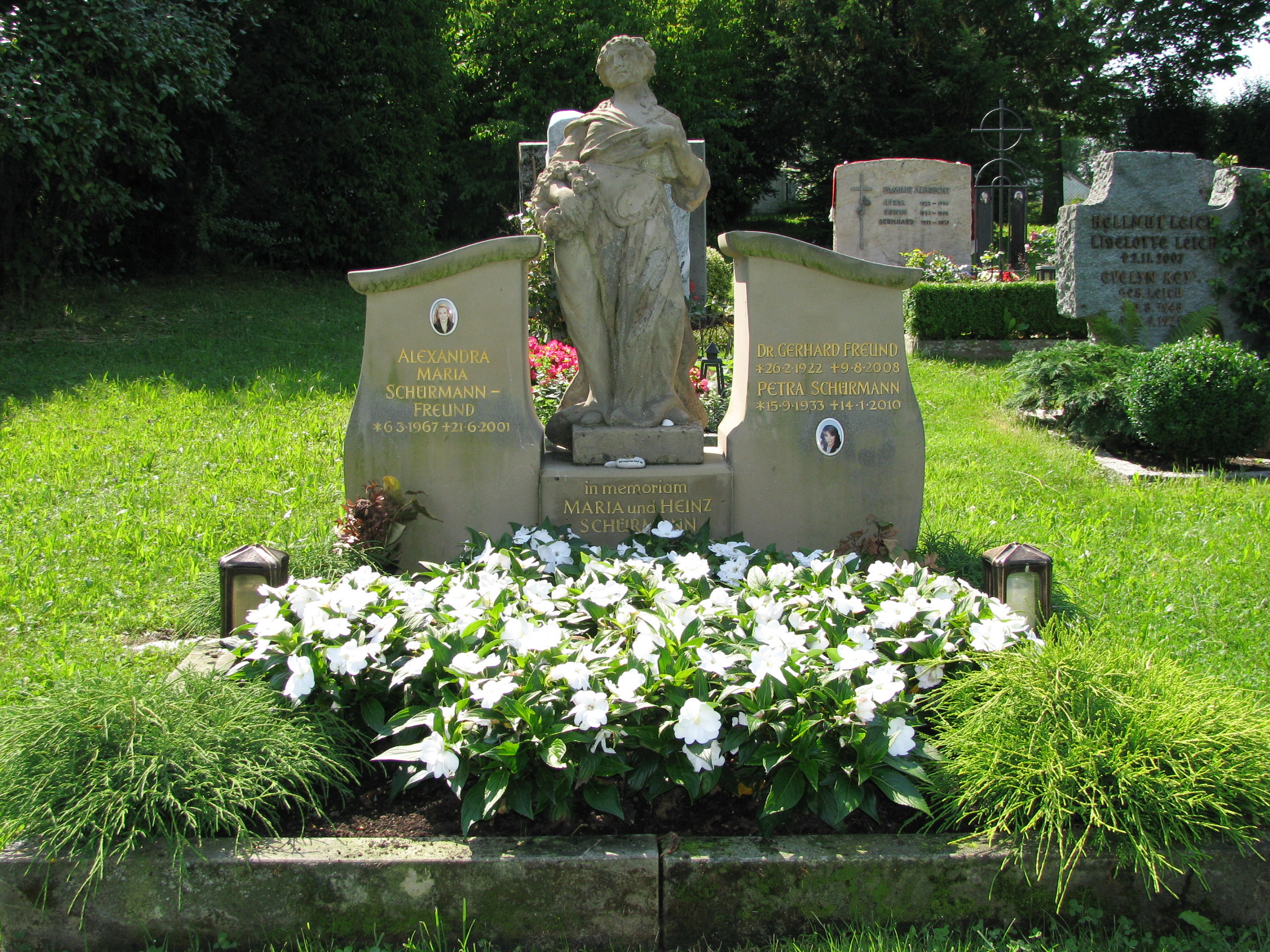
Schürmann grave in 2010

Schürmann won the 1956 Miss World contest, representing West Germany.

As of 2012 she is the only German to win this title, with the exception of Gabriella Brum who won the title in 1980 but resigned one day later. The pageant was held in London, United Kingdom. Schürmann finished only third in the Miss Germany pageant, but was chosen to represent her country in London because of her better knowledge of English.

At that time Schürmann was studying philosophy and history of the arts at the universities of Bonn and Cologne. After winning her Miss World title, she continued her studies in Munich. Beginning with the 1960s Schürmann entered an ongoing radio and television career, primarily with the Munich-based Bayerischer Rundfunk. She also did some acting and wrote several books. Schürmann returned to the Miss World contest in 1979, when she was one of the judging panel selecting that year's winner.

Schürmann in 1956

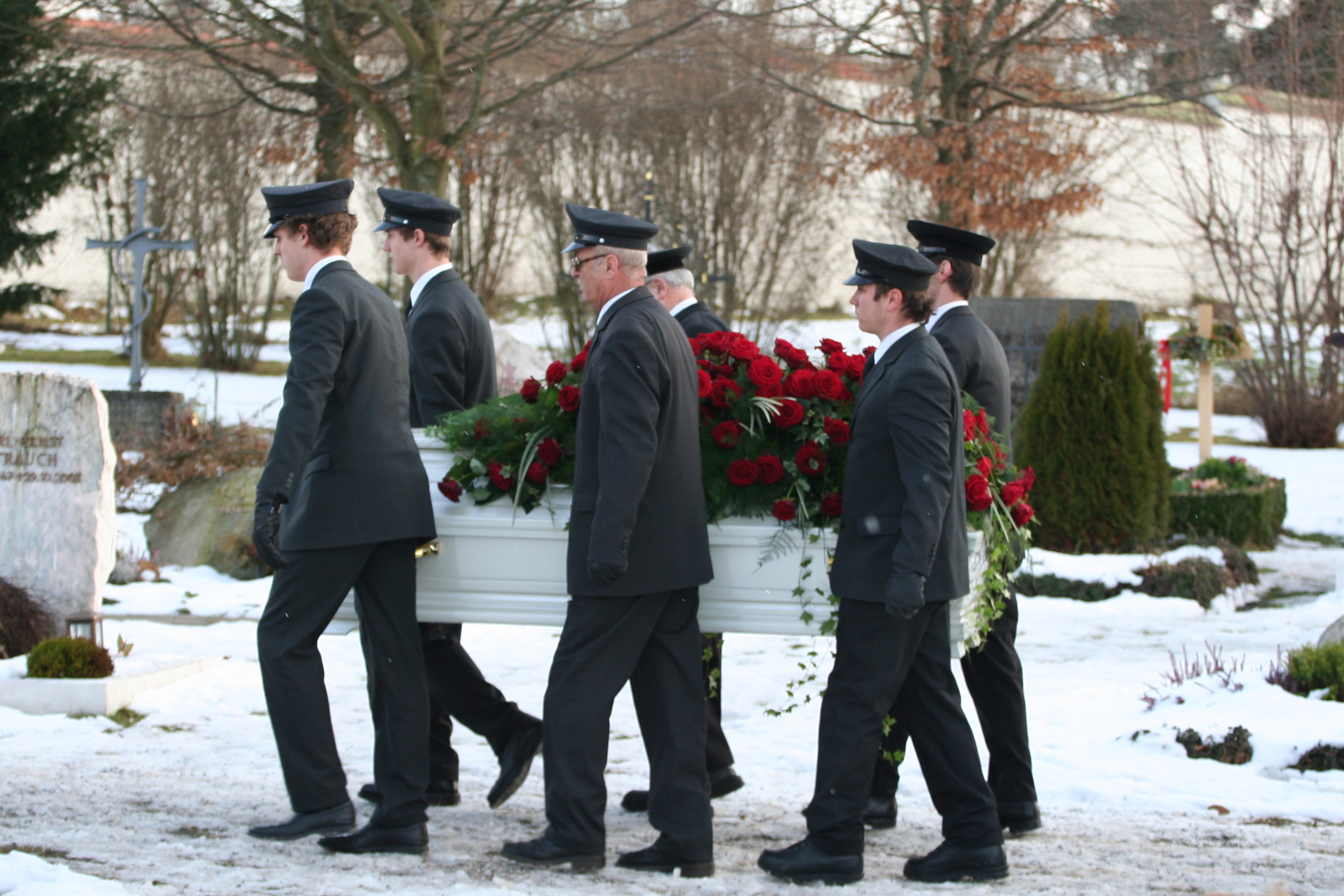
Schürmann last ceremony on 19 January 2010

== Personal life ==
In 1973, Schürmann married the physician Dr. Gerhard Freund, who under a veil of secrecy, had fathered their daughter Alexandra in 1967. This was at a time when he was still wed to German actress Marianne Koch. Alexandra Freund also had a successful career with the Munich broadcaster but died in 2001, aged 34, from an automobile accident when she collided with a wrong-way driver.

Schürmann never fully recovered from the loss of her daughter, with whom she was very close. From 2003 until her death, she was involved in an intimate relationship with Felix Raslag, CEO of a biotech company in Munich, who was 35 years her junior.

== Death ==
Schürmann retired in 2006 with her husband to their house on the shores of Lake Starnberg, south of Munich. When he died in August 2008, they had been married for 35 years. She died on 14 January 2010 in her home in Starnberg following a long illness. adda

== Selected filmography ==
- Hot Pavements of Cologne (1967)
- The Body in the Thames (1971)

Awards and achievements
Preceded by (Venezuela) Susana Duijm	Miss World; 1956	Succeeded by (Finland) Marita Lindahl
