= Lior =

Israeli-Australian singer-songwriter

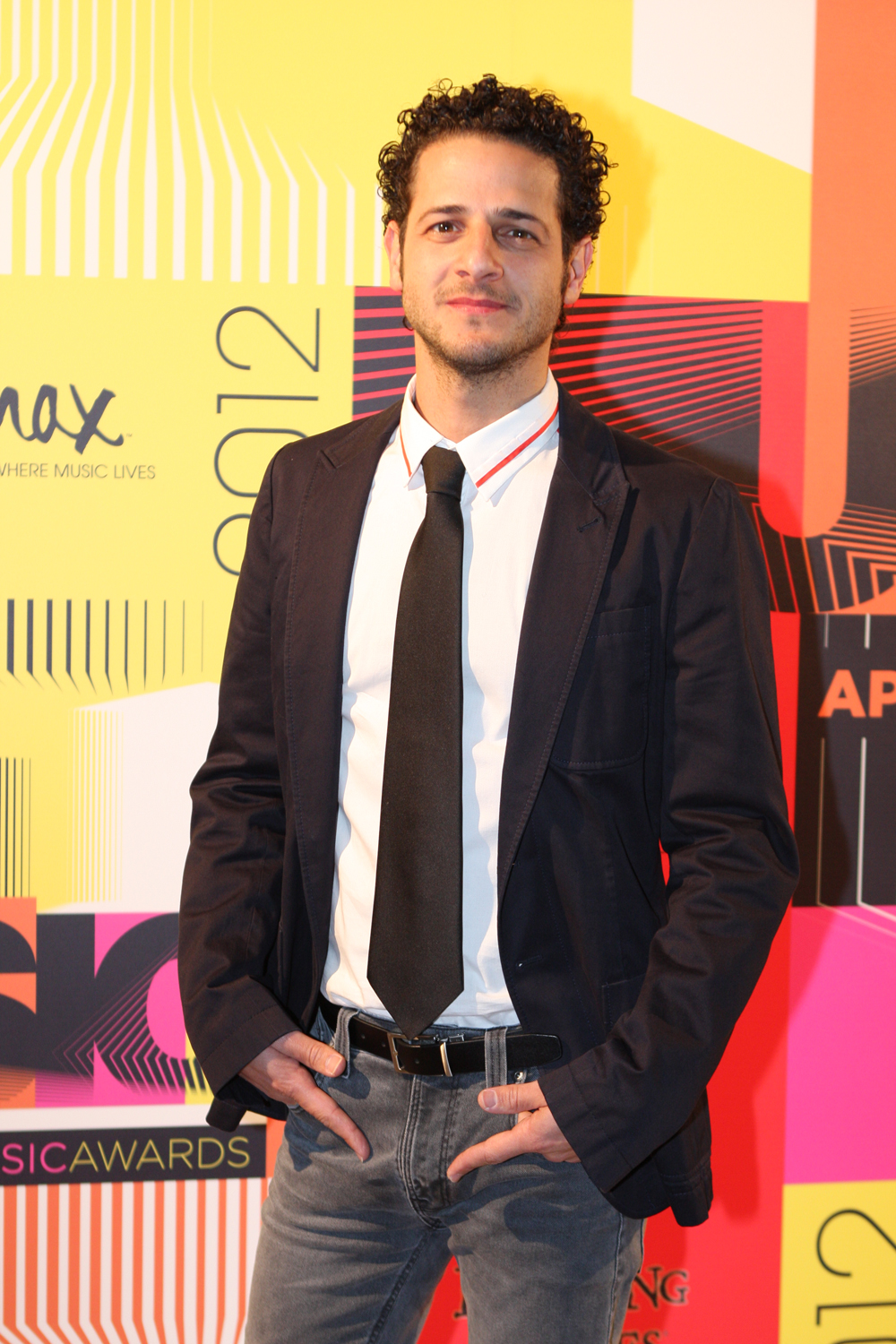

Background information
- Born: Lior Attar; Rishon LeZion, Israel
- Genre: Indie
- Occupation: Singer-songwriter
- Years active: 2000–present
- Labels: Senso Unico, ABC Classics
- Website: lior.com.au

Lior Attar, better known simply as Lior, is an independent Australian singer-songwriter based in Melbourne. He is best known for his 2005 debut studio album Autumn Flow, which featured singles such as "Daniel", the title track, and his signature song "This Old Love". In October 2024, his sixth studio album, The Blue Parade, was released.

== Early life and education ==
Lior Attar was born in Rishon LeZion, Israel. He and his family moved to Sydney when he was 10, making their first Australian home in Lane Cove.

Lior studied at Killara High School and the University of New South Wales.

== Career ==
=== 2000–2007: Early EP, Autumn Flow and Doorways of My Mind ===
In 2000, Lior released his debut extended play The Soul Suicide EP.

In October 2004, Lior released his debut studio album Autumn Flow. Autumn Flow made its ARIA chart debut in early 2005, peaking at number 45. Lior has toured with the WOMAD festival in 2005 to the UK, Singapore and Korea. At ARIA Music Awards of 2005, the album was nominated for three awards; Breakthrough Artist, Best Male Artist, and Best Independent Release. In 2005, the album was one of the fifteen nominees for radio station triple j's inaugural J Award, given to "an album of outstanding achievement as an Australian musical work of art – for its creativity, innovation, musicianship and contribution to Australian music." Autumn Flow was certified gold by ARIA in 2006.

In February 2006, Lior released a live album, Doorways of My Mind, recorded at the Northcote Social Club. The album consisted mostly of tracks from Autumn Flow as well as some new material such as "Diego and the Village Girl", "Burying Chances" and "Avinu Malkeinu" (a traditional prayer). At the ARIA Music Awards of 2006, the album was nominated for two awards; Best Independent Release and Best Blues and Roots Album.

Lior moved from Sydney to Melbourne in 2007.

=== 2008–2012: Corner of an Endless Road, Tumbling into the Dawn and Giggle and Hoot ===
Lior has collaborated extensively with François Tétaz, who produced and co-wrote his second studio album Corner of an Endless Road, arranging Lior's songs for various instruments and voices. The album was released in February 2008, and it debuted at number 13 on the ARIA charts. At the ARIA Music Awards of 2008, the album was nominated for the Best Independent Release.

In 2008, Lior toured extensively, both in his home country of Australia and abroad including feature performances at the Edinburgh Festival. In early 2009, he performed with the Adelaide Symphony Orchestra for a series of outdoor concerts. In 2009, Lior launched the Shadows and Light Tour, a collaboration with renowned shadow artists Stephen Mushin and Anna Parry; an interactive performance combining Lior's music with live shadow art performance and featured a season at the Sydney Opera House.

In 2009, Lior was approached by children's television show Giggle and Hoot series producer Clare Gerber, and was asked to write a song. He agreed thinking "this could be fun" and wrote "Hoot's Lullaby". The song played nightly on ABC 2 just before 7:00pm, and marked the end of children's programming on the channel for the day.

In October 2010, Lior released his third studio album Tumbling into the Dawn. The album peaked at number 26 on the ARIA charts.

In 2011 Lior wrote and recorded "Hey Hootabelle" for Giggle and Hoot. At the APRA Music Awards of 2012, the song won the APRA Award for Best Original Song Composed for Screen.

=== 2013–2018: Compassion, Scattered Reflections and Between You and Me ===
In September 2013, Lior and Nigel Westlake premiered Compassion at the Sydney Opera House. Compassion is an orchestral song cycle for voice and orchestra consisting of original melodies and orchestration set to ancient texts in Hebrew and Arabic, all centred around the wisdom of compassion. The performance was recorded and the album of Compassion was released in November 2013. At the ARIA Music Awards of 2014, it won the ARIA Award for Best Classical Album. Lior premiered Compassion in the US with the Austin Symphony Orchestra in 2016 and was subsequently awarded the Austin Table Critics' Award for Best Symphonic Performance of 2015-16 and in 2016 Lior also won the Melbourne Music Prize Civic Choice Award for Compassion.

In March 2014, Lior released his fourth studio album Scattered Reflections. The album peaked at number 23 on the ARIA charts.

In April 2015, Lior was invited as the sole Australian artist to perform at the prestigious 100 year anniversary of the landing at Gallipoli, performing his song "Safety of Distance" with the Gallipoli choir leading in to the dawn service. The song was produced in collaboration with François Tétaz.

In June 2015, Autumn Flow was re-released as a tenth anniversary edition.

From December 2015, Lior played the part of Motel Kamzoil in Fiddler on the Roof at Melbourne's Princess Theatre opposite musical theatre star Anthony Warlow.

In 2016, Lior worked with producer Tony Buchen to write an orchestral score for The Wider Earth, a Queensland theatre production based on Charles Darwin's journey on HMS Beagle. At the 2016 Matilda Theatre Awards, the music won Best Original Theatre Score.

In 2016 Lior co-wrote and recorded a children's album with The Idea of North and Elena Kats-Chernin for the HUSH Foundation. Created for the dual purpose of raising funds for the children's hospital as well as making original music to be played in the wards, the album A Piece of Quiet featured original music written to lyrics written by the children in the hospital wards and was released in October 2016. At the ARIA Music Awards of 2017, the album was nominated for Best Children's Album.

Throughout 2018 Lior toured with Australian pianist and composer Paul Grabowsky in performing a collection of Lior's songs adapted and reinterpreted for piano and voice. In 2019 Lior featured as the guest vocalist for the Australian Chamber Orchestra's 'Luminous' tour which toured nationally in Australia as well as performances in the Barbican in London.

In September 2018, Lior released his fifth studio album Between You and Me.

In 2018 Lior was awarded a Fellowship of the Australian Institute of Music in recognition of outstanding achievements and services to Australian music.

=== 2019–present: Air Land Sea and Animal in Hiding ===
In 2019, Lior formed the musical group Air Land Sea with Nadav Kahn and Tony Buchen. The group released four singles and a self-titled studio album across 2019.

In 2019 Lior was awarded the Sidney Myer Creative Fellowship, an award of A$160,000 over two years, given to mid-career creatives and thought leaders.

As part of the 2021 WOMADelaide concert series, Lior performed his symphony Compassion alongside composer Nigel Westlake and the Adelaide Symphony Orchestra.

In 2021, Lior collaborated with fellow singer-songwriter Domini Forster on Animal in Hiding. Lior said "She's been my support act for awhile now, after awhile, she became the backing vocalist in my band and then leading up to my last solo album, we decided we'd have a crack at writing a song together."

In October 2024, his sixth studio album, The Blue Parade, was released.

== Philanthropy ==
In a 2015 interview, Lior mentioned working for the charities Cambodian Children's Trust and Global Poverty Project as well as supporting Oscar's Law.

== Discography ==
=== Albums ===
==== Studio albums ====
List of studio albums, with selected chart positions and certifications
Title	Album details	Peak chart positions	Certifications
Title	Album details	AUS	Certifications
Autumn Flow	Released: October 2004; Label: Senso Unico (SENSOCD444); Format: CD, LP	45	ARIA: Gold
Corner of an Endless Road	Released: February 2008; Label: Senso Unico (SENSOCD888); Format: CD, DD	13	
Tumbling into the Dawn	Released: October 2010; Label: Senso Unico (SENSOCD111); Format: CD, DD	26	
Scattered Reflections	Released: March 2014; Label: Senso Unico (SENSOCD333); Format: CD, DD	23	
Between You and Me	Released: September 2018; Label: Senso Unico (SENSOCD369); Format: CD, DD, streaming		
The Blue Parade	Released: October 2024; Label: Senso Unico (SENSOCD999); Format: CD		

==== Live albums ====
List of live albums, with selected details
Title	Album details	Peak chart positions
Title	Album details	AUS
Doorways of My Mind	Released: February 2006; Label: Senso Unico (SENSOCD666); Format: CD; Recorded live at Northcote Social Club in November 2005	98
Compassion (with Nigel Westlake & Sydney Symphony Orchestra)	Released: November 2013; Label: ABC Classics (ABC0678); Format: CD, digital download; Recorded live at Sydney Opera House in September 2013	—

==== Other albums ====
List of other albums, with selected details
Title	Album details
A Piece of Quiet (The Hush Collection, Vol 16) (featuring Lior, The Idea of North & Elena Kats-Chernin )	Released: October 2016; Label: ABC Classics (4814581); Format: CD, digital download
Ali's Wedding (soundtrack) (Nigel Westlake & Sydney Symphony Orchestra with Joseph Tawadros, Slava Grigoryan & Lio)	Released: September 2017; Label: ABC Classics (4815738); Format: CD, digital download

==== Compilation albums ====
List of compilation albums, with selected details
Title	Album details
3-2-1	Released: 2011 (Europe only); Label: Rough Trade (SENSOCD999C); Format: CD

=== Extended plays ===
List of extended plays, with selected details
Title	Album details
The Soul Suicide EP	Released: 2000; Label: Senso Unico (SENSOCD101); Format: CD
Animal in Hiding	Released: 15 October 2021; Label: Lior & Domini; Format: DD, streaming

=== Certified singles ===
Year	Title	Certifications	Album
2004	"This Old Love"	ARIA: Gold	Autumn Flow

== Awards ==
=== AIR Awards ===
The Australian Independent Record Awards (commonly known informally as AIR Awards) is an annual awards night to recognise, promote and celebrate the success of Australia's Independent Music sector.

Year	Nominee / work	Award	Result
2006	Autumn Flow	Best Performing Independent Album	Nominated
2006	himself	Independent Artist of the Year	Nominated
2008	Corner of an Endless Road	Best Independent Album	Nominated
2008	Corner of an Endless Road	Best Independent Blues and Roots Album	Nominated
2008	himself	Best Independent Artist	Nominated

=== ARIA Music Awards ===
The ARIA Music Awards is an annual awards ceremony that recognises excellence, innovation, and achievement across all genres of Australian music. Lior has won two awards from nine nominations.

Year	Nominee / work	Award	Result
2005	Autumn Flow	Best Male Artist	Nominated
2005	Autumn Flow	Breakthrough Artist - Album	Nominated
2005	Autumn Flow	Best Independent Release	Nominated
2006	Doorways of My Mind	Best Blues & Roots Album	Nominated
2006	Doorways of My Mind	Best Independent Release	Nominated
2008	Corner of an Endless Road	Best Independent Release	Nominated
2014	Compassion (with Nigel Westlake & Sydney Symphony Orchestra)	Best Classical Album	Won
2017	Ali's Wedding (soundtrack) (with Nigel Westlake, Sydney Symphony Orchestra, Joseph Tawadros & Slava Grigoryan)	Best Original Soundtrack or Musical Theatre Cast Album	Won
2017	A Piece of Quiet (The Hush Collection, Vol 16) (with The Idea of North & Elena Kats-Chernin)	Best Children's Album	Nominated

=== APRA Awards ===
The APRA Awards are held in Australia and New Zealand by the Australasian Performing Right Association to recognise songwriting skills, sales and airplay performance by its members annually. Lior has won one award from five nominations.

Year	Nominee / work	Award	Result
2006	"Daniel"	Most Performed Blues & Roots Work	Nominated
2009	"Heal Me"	Most Performed Blues & Roots Work	Nominated
2012	"Hey Hootabelle" for Giggle and Hoot, written by Lior	Best Original Song Composed for the Screen	Won
2012	Hootabelle	Best Music for Children's Television	Nominated
2014	Compassion (with Nigel Westlake	Work of the Year – Orchestral	Nominated

=== J Award ===
The J Awards are an annual series of Australian music awards that were established by the Australian Broadcasting Corporation's youth-focused radio station Triple J. They commenced in 2005.

Year	Nominee / work	Award	Result
2005	Autumn Flow	Australian Album of the Year	Nominated
