= Scattered Reflections =

Studio album by Lior
- Released: 7 March 2014
- Length: 36:42
- Label: Senso Unico
- Producer: Lachlan Carrick

Lior chronology
Compassion (2013)	Scattered Reflections (2014)	A Piece of Quiet (The Hush Collection, Vol 16) (2016)

Scattered Reflections is the fourth studio album by Australian independent singer-songwriter, Lior. The album was released on 7 March 2014 and peaked at number 23 on the ARIA Charts.

Lior said "The making of this album had a sense of freedom and joy to it. Conceptually I feel that it's filled with reflections that only a richer life experience could provide, while musically, Lachlan (Carrick) and the new band members have brought a new and stylish sound to the arrangements. I'm really proud of this album and hope it connects, particularly with the people that were so generous in lending their support to crowd source this record."

== Reception ==
Cam Findlay from The Music AU said "The image of Lior leaning forlorn against a table on the cover should give you some indication: this is him looking deep into his past, from lost love ('Bells of Montreal') to childhood ('A Lift in the Morning Fog') to his grandfather ('My Grandfather'). It's sincere, sure, but comes across as too sincere to the point of cheesy."

Greg Phillips from Australian Music said the album "is a quality collection of beautiful melodies complemented perfectly by the talented artist's observational prose."

Cairns Post said "Scattered Reflections represents Lior at his most creative and inspired, effortlessly traversing between his trademark soft acoustic roots to deeper, more complex territory, without batting a proverbial eyelid."

== Track listing ==
1. "Soon" - 3:49
2. "I Remember Me" - 2:49
3. "A Lift in the Morning Fog" - 2:44
4. "Out in the Country" - 4:01
5. "Help Me Up" - 2:40
6. "My Grandfather" - 4:07
7. "Bells of Montreal" - 2:49
8. "Scattered Reflections" - 3:24
9. "Learn to Live" - 3:30
10. "Caught Up" - 3:35
11. "Days to Remember" - 3:04

== Charts ==
Chart (2014)	Peak position
Australian Albums (ARIA)	23

== Release history ==
Region	Date	Format	Label	Catalogue
Australia	7 March 2014	CD; digital download	Senso Unico	SENSOCD333
