= Frances Duca =

Maltese Australian actress

- Born: Fgura, Malta
- Beauty pageant titleholder
- Title: Miss World Malta 1980
- Major competitions: Miss World Malta 1980 (Winner); Miss World 1980 (Unplaced)

Frances Duca is a Maltese Australian actress and beauty pageant titleholder who was crowned Miss World Malta 1980 and represented her country at Miss World 1980 pageant but unplaced. She was nominated for the 2017 AACTA Award for Best Actress in a Supporting Role for her role in Ali's Wedding.
