= Tumbling into the Dawn =

Studio album by Lior
- Released: October 2010
- Recorded: 2010
- Studio: Oceanic Studio, Sheephouse Studios, Soundpark Studios; Australia.
- Label: Senso Unico
- Producer: François Tétaz, Lachlan Carrick

Lior chronology
Corner of an Endless Road (2008)	Tumbling into the Dawn (2010)	Compassion (2013)

Tumbling into the Dawn is the third studio album by Australian independent singer-songwriter, Lior. The album was released in October 2010 and peaked at number 26 on the ARIA Charts.

The album's lead single, titled, "I Thought I Could Sing On My Own", was released in July 2010.

Lior told Beat Magazine that unlike previous albums, where he wrote the song with a guitar, he wrote these songs on a piano which allowed him them to have "stronger melodies". "A lot of my songs are about everyday struggle, but I think this album is more direct and less about mood. I wanted to make the songs jump out and speak for themselves rather than hide their emotions."

== Reception ==
Michael Awosoga-Samuel from Readings said "The latest release starts with a chirpy 1970s Wings-sounding track called 'Shadow Man' and I thought I could sing on my own. The record is split into two parts – a rockier first half and a more introspective second. This arrangement works well, allowing you to settle into the rhythm of the piece. Again, Lior has not disappointed, and his many fans will approve."

== Track listing ==
1. "Shadow Man" - 4:08
2. "I Thought I Could Sing On My Own" - 3:58
3. "If I Lost Your Love" - 3:38
4. "Driftwood" - 3:05
5. "Stone Is Dead" - 2:40
6. "Tumbling into the Dawn" - 4:27
7. "Interlude" - 1:14
8. "Sulitha" - 3:31
9. "Everybody's Doing That" - 3:06
10. "Chewing Gum" - 2:49
11. "They Don't Know What's Going On" - 3:42
12. "Secret Little Garden" - 4:47

== Charts ==
Chart (2010)	Peak position
Australian Albums (ARIA)	26

== Release history ==
Region	Date	Format	Label	Catalogue
Australia	October 2010	CD; digital download	Senso Unico	SENSOCD111
