= Miss World 1980 =

Beauty pageant edition

- Miss World 1980 Titlecard
- Date: 13 November 1980
- Presenters: Peter Marshall, Judith Chalmers, Anthony Newley
- Venue: Royal Albert Hall, London, United Kingdom
- Broadcaster: Thames Television
- Entrants: 68
- Placements: 15
- Withdrawals: Chile; El Salvador; French Polynesia; Iceland; Nigeria; Portugal
- Returns: Curaçao; Papua New Guinea; Zimbabwe
- Winner: Gabriella Brum; Germany (resigned); Kimberley Santos; Guam (assumed)

Miss World 1980, the 30th anniversary of the Miss World pageant, was held on 13 November 1980 at the Royal Albert Hall in London, United Kingdom, televised for the first time by Thames Television for ITV. The winner was Gabriella Brum from West Germany. She was crowned by Miss World 1979, Gina Swainson of Bermuda. First runner-up was Kimberley Santos representing Guam, Patricia Barzyk from France finished second, while third place was awarded to Anat Zimmermann of Israel; and fourth was Kim Ashfield from the United Kingdom.

== Background ==
Gabriella Brum resigned after 18 hours of being crowned Miss World, and 14 days later, first runner-up, Kimberley Santos from Guam, was crowned by former Miss World 1977, Mary Stävin from Sweden.

=== Returns, and withdrawals ===
This edition marked the return of Curaçao, Papua New Guinea and Zimbabwe; Zimbabwe last competed (as Rhodesia) (Note: After the dissolution of the Federation of Rhodesia and Nyasaland on 31 December 1963, Rhodesia (later renamed Zimbabwe) continued to use the name 'Rhodesia' for some time. Zimbabwe first participated under the name 'Rhodesia' in Miss World 1965) in 1965, Papua New Guinea last competed in 1977 and Curaçao last competed in 1978. Chile, El Salvador, French Polynesia, Iceland, Nigeria and Portugal, withdrew from the competition for unknown reasons.

== Results ==
=== Placements ===
Placement	Contestant
Miss World 1980	West Germany – Gabriella Brum (resigned)
1st Runner-Up	Guam – Kimberley Santos (assumed)
2nd Runner-Up	France – Patricia Barzyk
3rd Runner-Up	Israel – Anat Zimmermann
4th Runner-Up	United Kingdom – Kim Ashfield
Top 7	New Zealand – Vicki Lee Hemi; United States – Brooke Alexander
Top 15	Austria – Sonya-Maria Schlepp; Bermuda – Zina Marie Minks; India – Elizabeth Anita Reddi; Jamaica – Michelle Ann Harris; Puerto Rico – Michelle Torres; Sweden – Kerstin Jenemark; Venezuela – Hilda Abrahamz; Zimbabwe – Shirley Nyanyiwa

== Judges ==
- Eric Morley – Chairman and CEO of Miss World Organization
- Peter Thompson
- Alan Minter
- Viviane Ventura
- Bruce Forsyth
- Dennis Waterman
- Sophia Mamba
- Wilnelia Merced – Miss World 1975 from Puerto Rico
- John McMenamin

== Contestants ==
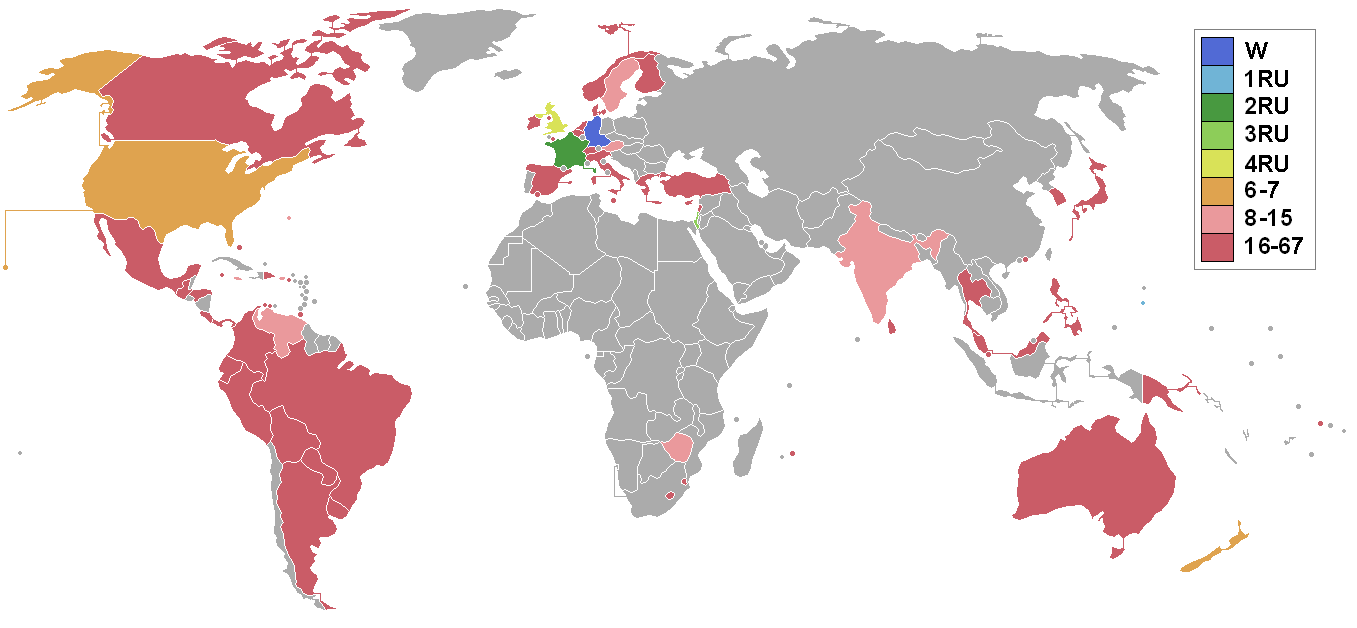
Countries and territories which sent delegates and results for Miss World 1980

67 contestants competed for the title.

Country/Territory	Contestant	Age (Note: Ages at the time of the pageant)	Hometown
Argentina	Elsa Galotti	20	Santa Fe
Aruba	Ethline Dekker	19	Oranjestad
Australia	Linda Shepherd	18	Wollongong
Austria	Sonya-Maria Schlepp	19	Graz
(The Bahamas) Bahamas	Bernadette Cash	20	Nassau
Belgium	Brigitte Billen	19	Limburg
Bermuda	Zina Minks	17	St. George's Parish
Bolivia	Sonia Malpartida	20	Sucre
Brazil	Loiane Aiache	18	Brasília
Canada	Annette Labrecque	19	Charlesbourg
Cayman Islands	Dealia Watler	21	George Town
Colombia	María Cristina Valencia	18	Armenia
Costa Rica	Marie Claire Tracy	20	San José
(Netherlands Antilles) Curaçao	Soraida de Windt	21	Willemstad
Cyprus	Parthenopi Vasiliadou	18	Limassol
Denmark	Jane Bill	18	Vejen
Dominican Republic	Patricia Polanco	18	Santo Domingo
Ecuador	Gabriela Ríos	19	Guayaquil
Finland	Ritva Tamio	19	Turku
France	Patricia Barzyk	17	Arbouans
Gibraltar	Yvette Domínguez	19	Gibraltar
Greece	Vera Zacharopoulou	19	Athens
Guam	Kimberley Santos	19	Toto
Guatemala	Lizabeth Martínez	19	Guatemala City
(Netherlands) Holland	Desiree Geelen	20	Amsterdam
Honduras	Etelvina Raudales	20	San Pedro Sula
(British Hong Kong) Hong Kong	Julia Chan	21	Hong Kong Island
India	Elizabeth Anita Reddi	21	Bombay
(Republic of Ireland) Ireland	Michelle Rocca	21	Dublin
Isle of Man	Voirrey Wallace	18	Douglas
Israel	Anat Zimmermann	18	Givatayim
Italy	Stefania de Pasquaci	17	Parma
Jamaica	Michelle Harris	21	Kingston
Japan	Kanako Ito	18	Tokyo
Jersey	Karen Poole	21	Saint Helier
Lebanon	Celeste El-Assal	19	Beirut
Lesotho	Lits'ila Lerotholi	18	Maseru
Malaysia	Callie Liew	23	Kuantan
Malta	Frances Duca	19	Fgura
Mauritius	Christiane Mackay	23	Grand Gaube
Mexico	Claudia Holley	18	Naucalpan
New Zealand	Vicki Lee Hemi	18	Hamilton
Norway	Maiken Nielsen	22	Oslo
Nicaragua	Kimberly Domínguez	19	Managua
Panama	Áurea Horta Torrijos	20	Panama City
Papua New Guinea	Mispah Alwyn	19	Port Moresby
Paraguay	Celia Schaerer	19	Asunción
Peru	Silvia Vega	21	Lima
Philippines	Milagros Nabor	20	Manila
Puerto Rico	Michelle Torres	19	Ponce
Singapore	Adda Pang	21	Singapore
South Korea (Note: Competed as Korea in the pageant)	Chang Sun-ja	21	Seoul
Spain	Francisca Ondiviela	17	Gran Canaria
Sri Lanka	Rosemarie Ramanayake	22	Colombo
(Eswatini) Swaziland	Nomagcisa Cawe	23	Manzini
Sweden	Kerstin Jenemark	21	Stenungsund
Switzerland	Jeannette Linkenheil	22	Basel
Thailand	Unchulee Chaisuwan	20	Bangkok
Trinidad and Tobago	Maria Octavia Chung	18	San Fernando
Turkey	Fahriye Ayloğlu	20	Istanbul
United Kingdom	Kim Ashfield	21	Buckley
United States	Brooke Alexander	16	Kailua
United States Virgin Islands	Palmira Frorup	24	Saint Croix
Uruguay	Ana Claudia Carriquiry	19	Montevideo
Venezuela	Hilda Abrahamz	21	Caracas
West Germany	Gabriella Brum	18	Berlin
Western Samoa	Liliu Tapuai	18	Apia
Zimbabwe	Shirley Nyanyiwa	22	Salisbury
