= Ali's Wedding =

- Theatrical film poster
- Directed by: Jeffrey Walker
- Written by: Andrew Knight; Osamah Sami
- Produced by: Helen Panckhurst; Sheila Jayadev
- Starring: Osamah Sami; Helana Sawires; Don Hany; Maha Wilson; Ryan Corr
- Cinematography: Donald McAlpine
- Edited by: Geoffrey Lamb
- Music by: Nigel Westlake
- Production company: Matchbox Pictures
- Release date: October 2016 (Adelaide)
- Running time: 110 minutes
- Country: Australia
- Languages: Arabic; English; Persian

Ali's Wedding is a 2016 Australian romantic comedy feature film from Matchbox Pictures. It is directed by Jeffrey Walker and written by Osamah Sami and stars Sami, Helana Sawires, Don Hany and Ryan Corr. Sami has been quoted as saying that the film is "history making, the first Muslim rom-com. This movie will hopefully pave the way for many other similar stories, not just from the Muslim community but from other communities and other minorities in our society." He said that the "affectionate and poignant story of love" was trying to cast a more positive light on Muslim-Australian life.

== Plot ==
Ali (Osamah Sami), the charming and musically-talented son of an Iraqi Shia cleric (Don Hany), struggles to make the right life choices despite the best of intentions. He wants to be with the girl, Dianne (Helana Sawires), he loves, but he's been promised to another girl at his father's mosque. He wants to be the great doctor that the community expects him to be, but he doesn't get the marks. Above all, he wants to make his father proud.

To live up to these impossible expectations, he lies about his academic achievements, and then his quest to please his father spirals out of control, with amusing and poignant consequences.

== Cast ==
- Osamah Sami as Ali Albasri
- Don Hany as Sheik Mahdi
- Helana Sawires as Dianne Mohsen
- Frances Duca as Zahra
- Khaled Khalafalla as Moe Greene
- Asal Shenavehzadeh as Ramona
- Majid Shokor as Seyyed Ghaffar
- Shayan Salehian as Luay
- Ghazi Alkinani as Abu Faisal
- Rodney Afif as Haj Karim
- Maha Wilson as Yomna
- Natalie Gamsu as Fatima
- Robert Rabiah as Mohsen
- Rahel Romahn as Ayoob
- Aljin Abella as Chris
- Ryan Corr as Wazza
- Jaafar Allamy as Jamal Al Hilfi
- Spencer McLaren as Tony
- Georgina Naidu as University Lecturer

== Release ==
Ali's Wedding premiered at the Adelaide Film Festival in October 2016. It also showed at the Sydney Film Festival on 8 June 2017.

== Reception ==
On review aggregator Rotten Tomatoes, the film holds an approval rating of 92% based on 26 reviews, with an average rating of 7/10, indicating critical acclaim. The website's critics consensus reads: "Ali's Wedding uses its very specific setting to explore universal ideas about relationships -- and in delightfully smart, funny fashion." On Metacritic, the film has a weighted average score of 64 out of 100, based on 4 critics, indicating "generally favorable reviews".

Critic of The Hollywood Reporter wrote in his glowing review "Walker's debut mines rapid-fire laughs and bountiful heart from a story of romantic misadventure set in train by a young man desperate to live up to his father's expectations."

In a commendatory review from The Sydney Morning Herald by critic Paul Byrnes, he wrote "It's a genuinely funny, sweetly human Australian comedy about one migrant's story. It needs no excuses: it's almost pitch-perfect for Australian tastes."

== Music ==
- see Ali's Wedding (soundtrack)

== Accolades ==
Award	Category	Subject	Result
AACTA Awards (7th)	Best Film	Sheila Jayadev	Nominated
AACTA Awards (7th)	Best Film	Helen Panckhurst	Nominated
AACTA Awards (7th)	Best Direction	Jeffrey Walker	Nominated
AACTA Awards (7th)	Best Original Screenplay	Andrew Knight	Won
AACTA Awards (7th)	Best Original Screenplay	Osamah Sami	Won
AACTA Awards (7th)	Best Actor	Osamah Sami	Nominated
AACTA Awards (7th)	Best Actress	Helana Sawires	Nominated
AACTA Awards (7th)	Best Supporting Actor	Don Hany	Nominated
AACTA Awards (7th)	Best Supporting Actress	Frances Duca	Nominated
AACTA Awards (7th)	Best Original Music Score	Nigel Westlake	Nominated
