= Brooke Alexander =

American actress

- Occupation: Actress
- Spouse: Marko Zelenovic (m. 2009)
- Children: 1
- Beauty pageant titleholder
- Title: Miss World America 1980
- Years active: 1987–present
- Major competitions: Miss World America 1980 (Winner); Miss World 1980 (Top 7)

Brooke Alexander is an American actress and beauty pageant titleholder who was crowned Miss World America 1980 and represented her country at Miss World 1980 in London where she placed Top 7. She is best known for her role as con-artist Samantha Markham in As the World Turns (1994–1996).

== Early years ==
Alexander grew up in Hawaii on the island of Oahu. She has a sister. After moving to New York when she was 18 years old, she became a model and an actress.

== Career ==
Alexander originated the role of con-artist Samantha Markham on As the World Turns in 1994 and played the role until 1996. She has had roles in Magnum, P.I., Island Son, P.S. I Luv U, Tattingers, and The Last Nightmaster and has also appeared on One Life to Live as Julia Michaels (2001).

From 2006 to 2007, she was a host of the "Real Simple" lifestyle television program based on Real Simple magazine.

== Personal life ==
Alexander gave birth to a son in 2004. On September 26, 2009, she married tennis player Marko Zelenovic in Water Mill, New York.

== Filmography ==
=== Film ===
Year	Title	Role	Notes
1987	I Love N.Y.	Model	
1988	Bum Rap	Pizza Girl	
1991	Cool as Ice	Reporter	
2011	Pearl Jam Twenty	Interviewer	

=== Television ===
Year	Title	Role	Notes
1989	Tattingers	Chastity	Episode: "Wall Street Blues"
1992	P.S. I Luv U	Cindy Davies	Episode: "The Chameleon"
1992	Blossom	Ms Quigly	Episode: "The Frat Party"
1993	Love & War	Woman In The Bar	Episode: "Opening Day"
1994–1996	As the World Turns	Samantha Markham	25 episodes
2010	Law & Order: Special Victims Unit	Beth Butler	Episode: "Ace"
2010	Law & Order: Criminal Intent	Carol Felix	Episode: "Love Sick"
2011	Hawaii Five-0	Diana Meachum	Episode: "Loa Aloha"
2012	Royal Pains	Mrs. Smythe	Episode: "About Face"
