= Anat Zamir =

Israeli model and actress

- ענת זמיר
- Born: Anat Zimmerman; 18 April 1962; Givatayim, Israel
- Died: 15 December 2018 (aged 56); Ramat Gan, Israel
- Occupations: Model; Actress
- Children: 1
- Beauty pageant titleholder
- Title: Miss Israel 1980
- Major competitions: Miss Israel 1980 (Winner); Miss World 1980 (3rd Runner-up)

Anat Zamir (Hebrew: ענת זמיר; 18 April 1962 – 15 December 2018) was an Israeli actress, model and beauty pageant titleholder. She was named Na'arat Israel at the Miss Israel contest of 1980 and went on to represent Israel at the Miss World 1980, contest where she was third runner-up. Zamir modelled for multiple companies and was in the 1990 film Kiss in the IDF and the 1991 film Shevet Choen.

== Early life ==
She was born Anat Zimmerman (Hebrew: ענת צימרמן) on 18 April 1962, in Givatayim, Israel where she was brought up. Zamir's parents were hard-of-hearing with her mother also mute, and was the youngest daughter with three elder brothers. Her father left her home when she was young, leaving Zamir and her siblings to be raised solely by her mother. She sang in the school choir and selected the surname Zamir. From the age of 13 until enrolling in the military, Zamir was sexually abused by a distant family member. She studied cosmetics and worked part-time for a while in such a role by opening a minor clinic. Zamir also worked in a jewellery store and then a clothing department.

== Career ==
She began a modelling career, being named Na’arat Israel (1st Runner-Up) at the Miss Israel contest at the Arad Sports Hall in Tel Aviv in 1980. That same year, Zamir represented Israel at the Miss World 1980 contest held in London. She was named the contest's third runner-up. She went on to model for companies such as Kodak and local firms like the swimwear brand Pepper, Jordosh, Polgat and George during the 1980s. In April 1990, Zamir began filming Kiss in the IDF in which she portrayed Yehuda Barkan's wife released later in the year. She also had a role as a model in the television series The Cohen Tribe. Zamir also had a role in the comedy film Shevet Cohen the year after. In 2016, she was a participant in the documentary The Lie of Beauty which is focused on the beauty world.

== Personal life ==
She was married four times. Zamir was married three times: first to Israeli businessperson Shuki Ben Porat, second marriage were to Israeli dentist Ami Vizhinsky, and last one to Israeli businessperson and restaurateur Rami Segs. She has a son from her only period of marriage with her second husband, Ami Vizhinsky.

== Death ==
Zamir had struggled with drug addiction during her whole adult life. On 14 December 2018, she collapsed on the pavement close to her small apartment in Tel Aviv. Zamir was transported to Sheba Medical Center, where she died the following day. She was buried in Yarkon Cemetery on 16 December with few attendees present and none from the fashion world.
