= Compassion (Nigel Westlake, Lior and Sydney Symphony Orchestra album) =

Live album by Nigel Westlake, Lior and Sydney Symphony Orchestra
- Released: November 2013
- Recorded: 6–7 September 2013
- Venue: Sydney Opera House
- Length: 40:40
- Label: ABC Music
- Producers: Bob Scott, Brooke Green, Lior, Nigel Westlake

Lior albums chronology
Tumbling into the Dawn (2010)	Compassion (2013)	Scattered Reflections (2014)

Compassion is a live album recorded at the Sydney Opera House in September 2013 by Nigel Westlake, Lior and Sydney Symphony Orchestra. Compassion is an orchestral song cycle for voice and orchestra consisting of original melodies and orchestration set to ancient texts in Hebrew and Arabic, all centred around the wisdom of compassion. The album was released in November 2013.

Nigel Westlake said "Compassion inhabits a vast array of emotions and colours, at times pulsating and riotous, at others reflective and textural, and draws upon the myriad of influences the two of us have been able to bring to the table from our incredibly diverse backgrounds. With the utmost respect, we have tried to imbue the ancient texts with a contemporary interpretation, adhering to the purity of a single voice and orchestra."

At the APRA Music Awards of 2014, the album was nominated for Work of the Year – Orchestral.

At the ARIA Music Awards of 2014, the album won Best Classical Album.

== Reception ==
Graham Strahle from The Australian said "Compassion is more than a film score. At the centre are Lior's easy flowing, luminous melodies of subtly exotic Middle Eastern inflection [and] Westlake's orchestrations exhibit fascinating stylistic touches."

Clive O'Connell from Sydney Morning Herald said "While not quoting traditional songs, apart from the moving prayer 'Avinu Malkeinu' that finishes the cycle, Westlake and Lior employ a range of modes, melismata and ornaments that suggest much Eastern Mediterranean music. The melody lines are wide-ranging, Lior using his microphone to telling effect, while Westlake's orchestrations surround the singer with muted ambient richness."

== Track listing ==
- all words and music by Nigel Westlake and Lior.
1. "Sim Shalom / Grant Peace" - 7:28
2. "Eize Hu Chacham? / Who is Wise?" - 5:25
3. "La Yu'minu / Until You Love Your Brother" - 4:18
4. "Inna Rifqa / The Beauty Within" - 4:55
5. "Al Takshu L'vavchem / Don't Harden Your Hearts" - 4:45
6. "Ma Wadani Ahudun / Until the End of Time" - 7:57
7. "Avinu Malkeinu / Hymn of Compassion" - 5:57

== Release history ==
Region	Date	Format	Label	Catalogue
Australia & New Zealand	15 November 2013	CD; digital download	ABC Classics	ABC0678
