= Sydney Symphony Orchestra =

Australian symphony orchestra

The Sydney Symphony Orchestra
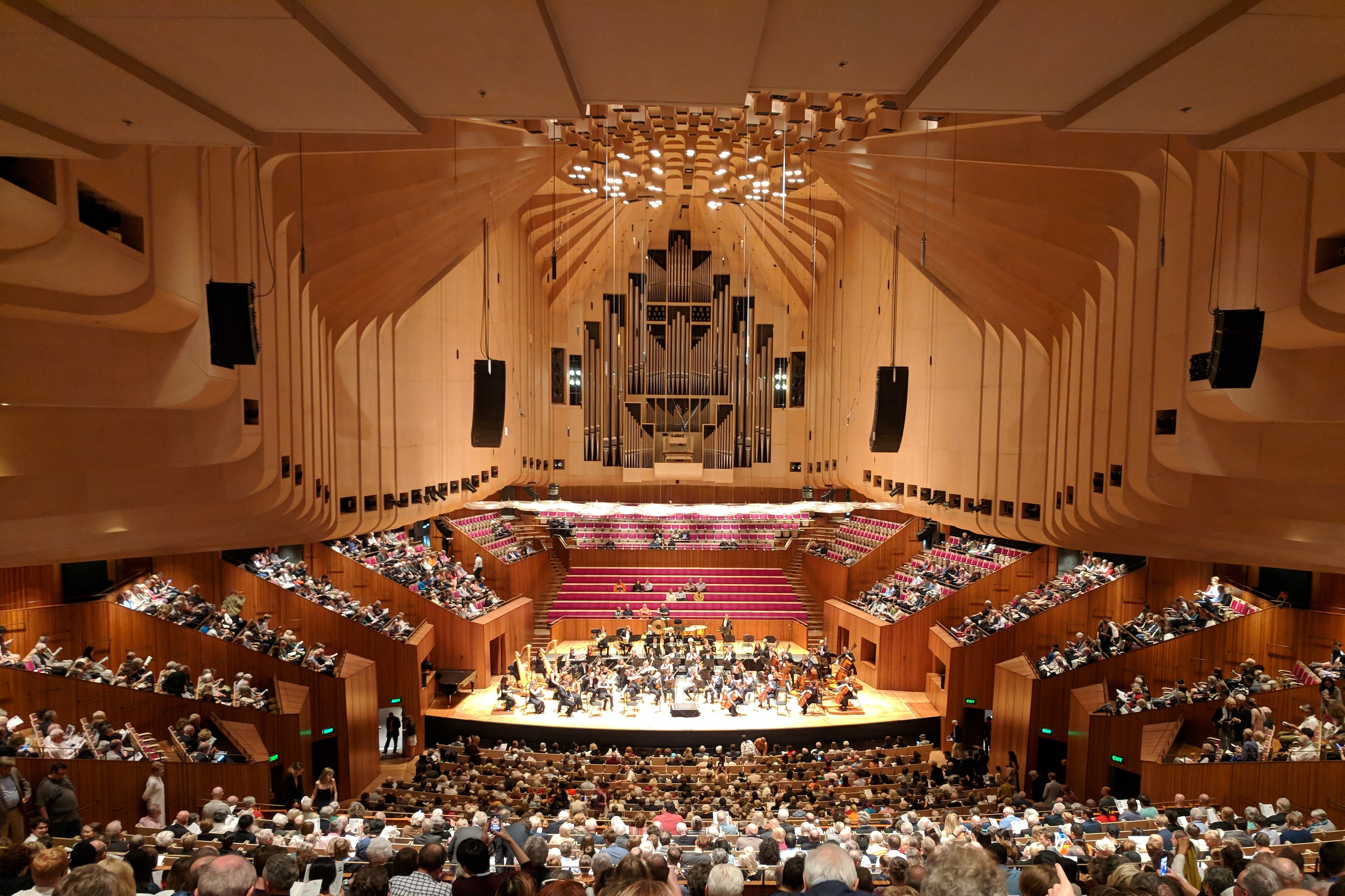
- The Sydney Symphony Orchestra in concert at the Sydney Opera House
- Former name: National Broadcasting Symphony Orchestra
- Founded: 1905; 121 years ago
- Concert hall: Sydney Opera House
- Principal conductor: Simone Young
- Website: www.sydneysymphony.com
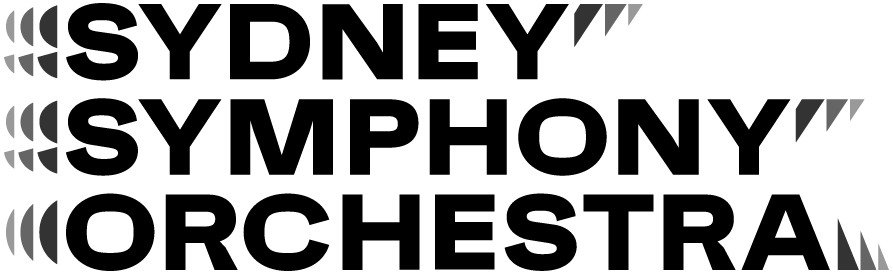

The Sydney Symphony Orchestra (SSO) is an Australian symphony orchestra based in Sydney. With roots going back to 1908, the orchestra was made a permanent professional orchestra on the formation of the Australian Broadcasting Commission in 1932. The orchestra has performed at the Sydney Opera House as its home concert hall, since the venue's opening in 1973. Simone Young is the orchestra's current chief conductor and the first female conductor in the post. The Symphony Chorus of Sydney Philharmonia Choirs has been the chorus of the orchestra since 1941.

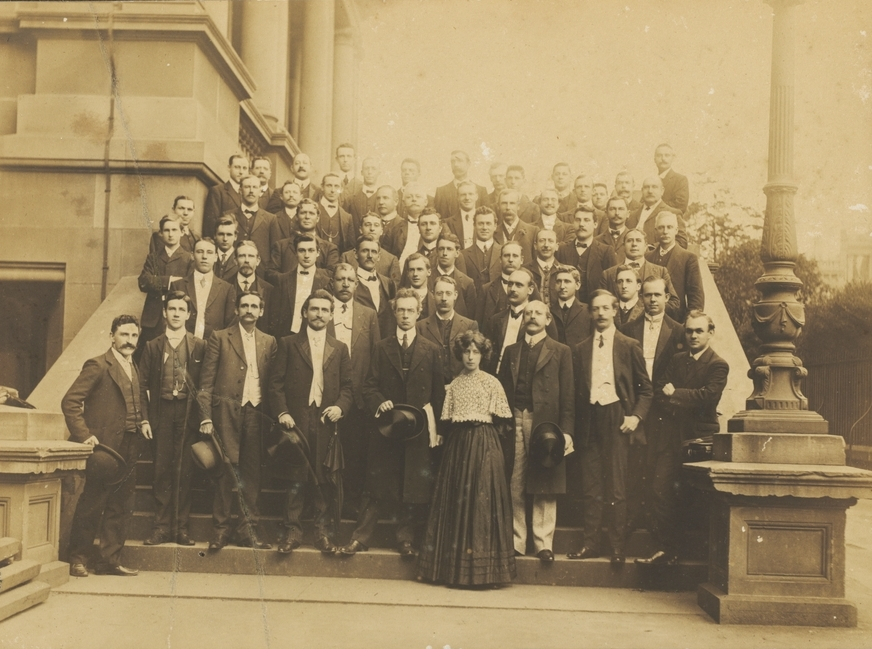
The Sydney Symphony Orchestra, pictured in 1908

The Sydney Symphony performs around 150 concerts a year to a combined annual audience of more than 350,000. The regular subscription concert series are mostly performed at the Sydney Opera House, but other venues around Sydney are used as well, including the City Recital Hall at Angel Place and the Sydney Town Hall. The Town Hall was the home of the orchestra until the opening of the Opera House in 1973. Since then, most concerts have been taking place in the Opera House's Concert Hall (capacity: 2,679 seats).

== History ==
The first concert by a group calling themselves the Sydney Symphony Orchestra was held on 30 September 1905. Sponsored by the Musicians Union, this group was formed from musicians who had come together to form an orchestra to accompany the pianist Ignacy Jan Paderewski's Sydney concerts when he toured Australia in 1904. A more sustained effort to establish an orchestra began in 1908 when an alliance between musicians, their union and leading business and legal figures organised regular subscription concerts. Between 1908 and 1917, a total of 47 concerts was held by a group calling themselves the Sydney Symphony Orchestra. These concerts included many Sydney premieres of key works of the classical repertoire including Schumann's Symphony No. 1 in B-flat, Brahms' Symphony No. 1 in C minor, and in 1910, Berlioz's Symphonie Fantastique as well as a number of quite recent, even modernist works including, in 1910, Richard Strauss's tone-poem Don Juan; in 1911, Debussy's Prélude à l'après-midi d'un faune; in 1912, Elgar's Enigma Variations; in 1913, Rimsky-Korsakov's Scheherazade; in 1914, Borodin's In the Steppes of Central Asia; and in 1917, Borodin's Symphony in B minor and Glazunov's Symphony in C minor. This initiative folded when most of the orchestra's members were recruited by the New South Wales State Conservatorium of Music's orchestra, then conducted by its founding director, Henri Verbrugghen.

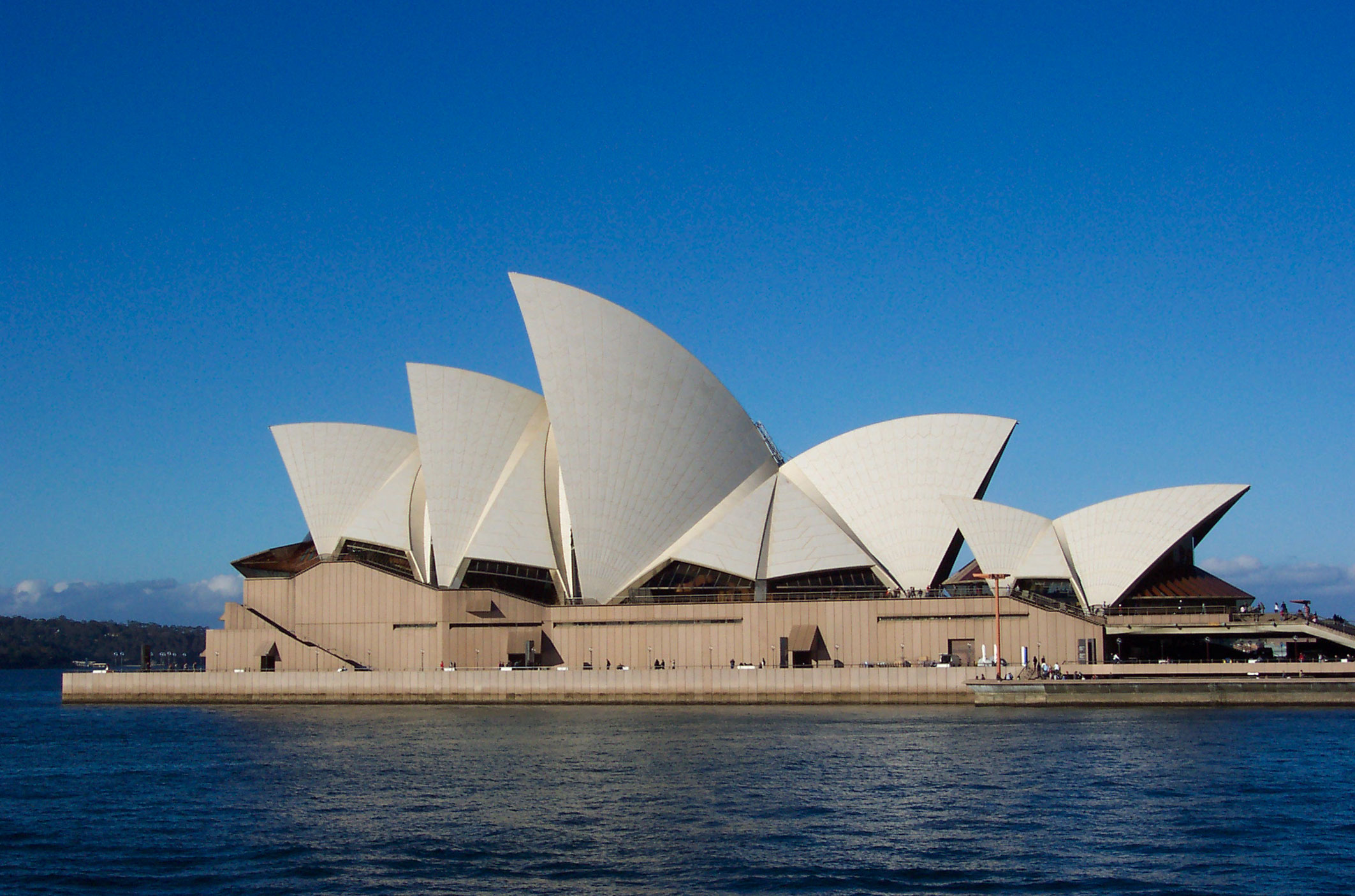
The Sydney Opera House, home of the Sydney Symphony Orchestra

Verbrugghen resigned from the Conservatorium in 1922 amidst controversy regarding funding for his orchestra. The Conservatorium student orchestra, supplemented by teachers continued to give concerts throughout the 1920s. Although there were regular calls for the government to provide funding for a permanent full-time professional orchestra, no such orchestra had been established in Sydney when the ABC began operation in 1932. Despite expectations, according to Fraser, the ABC's initial intervention was quite modest. It simply adopted the 20 piece orchestra already engaged in the Sydney studio by the ABC's predecessor, the privately run Australian Broadcasting Company. Within the year, this orchestra was expanded to a 24-player concert orchestra used primarily for the purposes of broadcasting. However it sometimes combined for concerts with the NSW State Conservatorium under different names including the ABC Symphony Orchestra and the NSW State Symphony Orchestra. It was not until 1936 that the ABC sponsored a new series of orchestra concerts in Sydney under the name of the "Sydney Symphony Orchestra". At this time the orchestra was increased to 45 players, and sometimes augmented to 70 players for public performances. It also again inaugurated annual concert seasons in that year. In 1937, the ABC purchased the name "Sydney Symphony Orchestra" from George Plummer who had been instrumental in establishing the initial Sydney Symphony Orchestra in 1908.

Because of the political instability in Europe in the 1930s, many leading artists spent large amounts of time in Australia. Performances were given under the direction of Antal Doráti and Sir Thomas Beecham. Soloists appearing with the orchestra included Arthur Rubinstein, Bronisław Huberman, Artur Schnabel and Jascha Spivakovsky.

At the end of World War II, the ABC reached agreement with the Sydney City Council and the New South Wales state government to jointly fund the orchestra. The new 80-member Sydney Symphony Orchestra gave its first concert in January 1946.

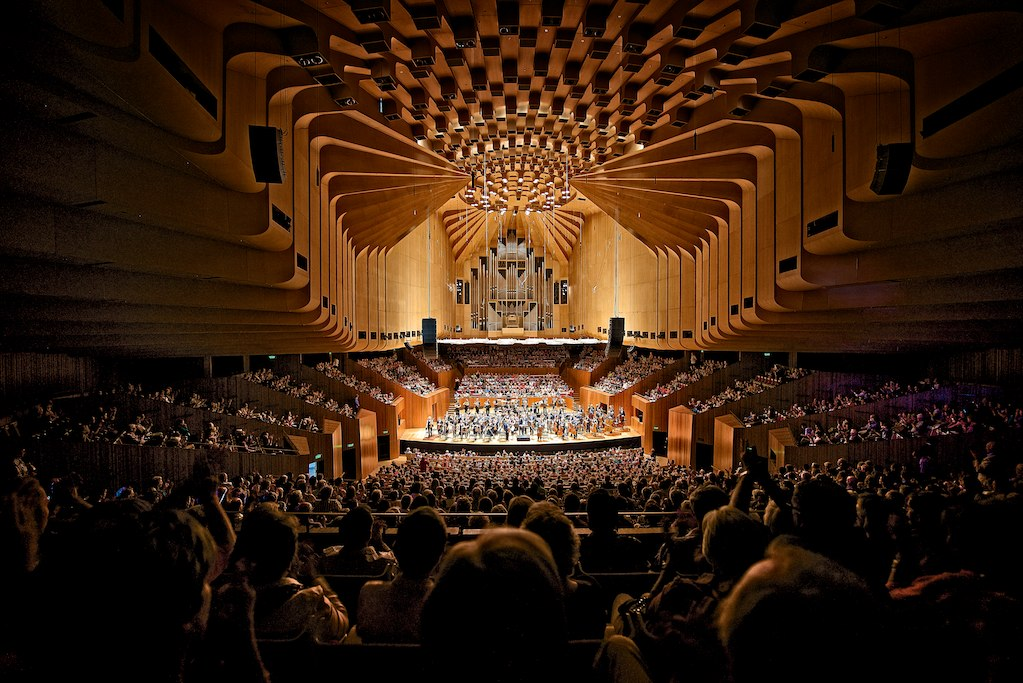
The Sydney Symphony Orchestra featuring James Ehnes playing a Violin Concerto by Prokofiev

Eugene Goossens joined the orchestra as its first chief conductor in 1947. Goossens introduced outdoor concerts and conducted Australian premieres of contemporary music. In 1948, he uttered the prophetic words, "Sydney must have an opera house!". Goossens was knighted in 1955, the year before his term was due to end. His tenure was abruptly cut short in March 1956 under personal circumstances deemed 'scandalous' at the time, and he was forced to return to England in disgrace.

Sir Eugene Goossens was succeeded by Nikolai Malko, Dean Dixon, Moshe Atzmon and Willem van Otterloo. Under van Otterloo, the orchestra made an eight-week European tour in 1974 which culminated in two concerts in Amsterdam and The Hague. Also under van Otterloo, the orchestra established the Concert Hall of the Sydney Opera House as its home base for most of its concerts.

In 1982, Sir Charles Mackerras, a former oboist with the orchestra, became the first Australian to be appointed its chief conductor. His term ended in 1985, although illness prevented him from conducting some later concerts. Zdeněk Mácal was initially appointed on a three-year contract from 1986 until 1988, which was reduced to one year, at his request; he nevertheless left abruptly in the first season. The young Australian conductor Stuart Challender, who had taken over some of Mackerras's commitments in 1985, became the orchestra's chief conductor in 1987. In Australia's bicentennial year (1988), Challender led the orchestra in a successful tour of the United States. He remained as chief conductor until his death in December 1991.

In 1994, the orchestra received increased support from the federal government, enabling it to raise the number of players to 110, increase touring and recording ventures, and improve orchestral salaries. That year, it also appointed Edo de Waart as the orchestra's chief conductor and artistic director. de Waart held the post until 2003.

Since de Waart's tenure, the Sydney Opera House has been the orchestra's full-time home, with all rehearsals taking place in the Opera House Concert Hall. Highlights of his tenure in Sydney included Wagner's Ring Cycle in concert, a focus on the works of his personal favourite Mahler and tours of Europe (1995), Japan (1996) and the United States (1998).

Gianluigi Gelmetti was chief conductor from 2004 to 2008, succeeded by Vladimir Ashkenazy (2009–2013). In May 2012, David Robertson was named as the SSO's next chief conductor, with an initial contract from 2014 to 2018. In July 2017, the SSO announced the extension of Robertson's contract by one year, through to the end of 2019. Robertson concluded his SSO chief conductorship in 2019.

In 2020, SSO launched a major project called 50 Fanfares to commission new works from fifty Australian composers. The first premiere was performed in February 2021 and some premieres took place outside Sydney in regional areas, while the Sydney Opera House Concert Hall was being renovated. CEO Emma Dunch said the goal of the program was to "renew the contemporary Australian repertoire".

Simone Young first guest-conducted the SSO in 1996. In December 2019, the SSO announced the appointment of Young as its next chief conductor, effective in 2022, with an initial contract of 3 years. Young is the first female conductor to be named chief conductor of the Sydney Symphony Orchestra. In February 2024, the SSO announced the extension of Young's contract as its chief conductor through the end of 2026.

== Financial structure ==
The SSO, like all the other major symphony orchestras in Australia, was funded by the federal government as a division of the Australian Broadcasting Corporation from the 1950s until the mid-2000s. A federal government review in 1994 severed the day-to-day management of the orchestra from the ABC and full independence was achieved on 1 January 2007. The orchestra now operates as a public company with a board of directors. Funding is provided by federal and state governments, corporate and private sponsorships and commercial activities as well as ticketing income.

== The SSO and the Sydney Opera House ==
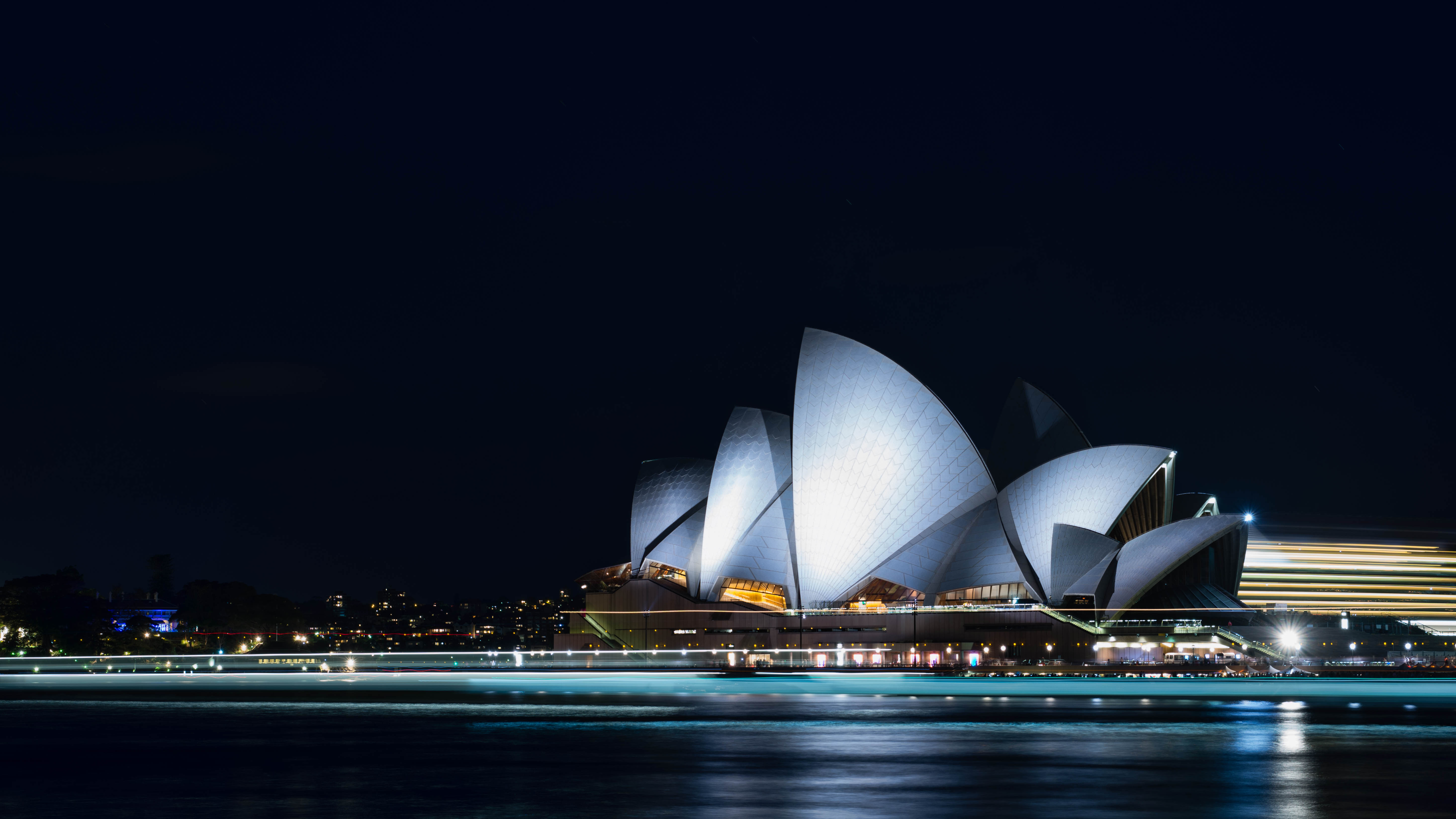
The iconic status of the building has opened up discussions over its orchestral potential.

The Sydney Opera House, while among the most famous buildings of the 20th century, is problematic for the orchestra. The SSO was instrumental in calling for a new Opera House to be built and it was always intended to be their home venue. However, control of the Opera House has always rested with a separate body, the Sydney Opera House Trust, and the two institutions have had conflicts.

The longest running point of contention is the refusal by the Opera House Trust to allow the orchestra to drill small holes into the concert hall stage to allow proper seating of the endpins (spikes on the bottom) of their cellos and double basses, which is believed to give a better resonance to these instruments. The orchestra seats their endpins in planks of wood placed on the stage, as the Opera House Trust maintains that the entire building is heritage-listed under Australian law and that such work would therefore be illegal. Edo de Waart was particularly critical of this during his tenure as Chief Conductor in the 1990s, arguing in the press that the building had been specifically constructed for the orchestra and that it was a scandal that the orchestra was being forced to accept a reduced sound quality. However, the Opera House Trust has refused to bend and as of 2012 the orchestra was still using the planks of wood.

In November 2016, temporary sound reflectors were installed in the concert hall of the Opera House, to assist in amelioration of the acoustics. Renovations were completed in 2022.

== Chief conductors ==
- Eugene Goossens (1947–1956)
- Nikolai Malko (1957–1961)
- Dean Dixon (1964–1967)
- Moshe Atzmon (1967–1971)
- Willem van Otterloo (1971–1978)
- Louis Frémaux (1979–1982)
- Sir Charles Mackerras (1982–1985)
- Zdeněk Mácal (1986)
- Stuart Challender (1987–1991)
- Edo de Waart (1993–2003)
- Gianluigi Gelmetti (2004–2008)
- Vladimir Ashkenazy (2009–2013)
- David Robertson (2014–2019)
- Simone Young (2022–present)

== Awards and nominations ==
=== APRA Classical Music Awards ===
The APRA Classical Music Awards are presented annually by Australasian Performing Right Association (APRA) and Australian Music Centre (AMC).

Year	Nominee / work	Award	Result
2003	Guyuhmgan (Georges Lentz) – Sydney Symphony	Orchestral Work of the Year	Nominated
2003	Ngangkar (Georges Lentz) – Sydney Symphony	Orchestral Work of the Year	Nominated
2003	Three Miró Pieces (Richard Meale) – Sydney Symphony	Orchestral Work of the Year	Won
2003	Adult Themes (2002) – Sydney Symphony Education Program – Sydney Symphony	Most Distinguished Contribution to the Presentation of Australian Composition by an Organisation	Won
2005	Concerto for Cello and Orchestra (Carl Vine) – Steven Isserlis, Sydney Symphony	Best Performance of an Australian Composition	Won
2005	Inflight Entertainment (Graeme Koehne) – Diana Doherty, Sydney Symphony, Takuo Yuasa (conductor)	Orchestral Work of the Year	Nominated
2005	2004 Education Program – Sydney Symphony	Outstanding Contribution to Australian Music in Education	Nominated
2006	Mysterium Cosmographicum (Michael Smetanin) – Lisa Moore, Sydney Symphony	Best Performance of an Australian Composition	Nominated
2006	Journey to the Horseshoe Bend (Andrew Shultz, Gordon Williams) – Ntaria Ladies Choir, Sydney Philharmonia Motet Choir, Sydney Symphony	Vocal or Choral Work of the Year	Nominated
2007	When the Clock Strikes Me (Nigel Westlake) – Rebecca Lagos (soloist), Sydney Symphony	Best Performance of an Australian Composition	Won
2007	Flying Banner (After Wang To) (Liza Lim) – Sydney Symphony, Gianluigi Gelmetti (conductor)	Orchestral Work of the Year	Won
2007	Liza Lim – Sydney Symphony Composer Residency	Outstanding Contribution by an Individual	Nominated
2007	Sydney Symphony Education Program – Sinfonietta Composition project	Outstanding Contribution to Australian Music in Education	Nominated
2008	Sydney Symphony Education Program – 2007 Sinfonietta Project	Outstanding Contribution to Australian Music in Education	Nominated
2009	Monh (Georges Lentz) – Tabea Zimmermann, Sydney Symphony, Steven Sloane (conductor)	Best Composition by an Australian Composer	Won

=== ARIA Music Awards ===
The ARIA Music Awards is an annual awards ceremony that recognises excellence, innovation, and achievement across all genres of Australian music. They commenced in 1987.

Year	Nominee / work	Award	Result	Ref.
1989	Australia Day / Child of Australia (with Australian Youth Orchestra, Joan Carden & John Howard)	Best Classical Album	Nominated	
1990	Peter and the Wolf/Carnival of the Animals (with Noni Hazlehurst)	Best Children's Album	Nominated	
1991	Sculthorpe: Orchestral Works (with Stuart Challender)	Best Classical Album	Won	
1992	Vine: 3 Symphonies (with Stuart Challender)	Best Classical Album	Won	
1994	Ross Edwards Orchestral Works (with Dene Olding, Stuart Challender & David Porcelijn)	Best Classical Album	Won	
2008	Brett Dean (with Brett Dean)	Best Classical Album	Nominated	
2011	Don John of Austria (with Alexander Briger)	Best Original Soundtrack, Cast or Show Album	Nominated	
2012	Elgar: The Dream of Gerontius (with Vladimir Ashkenazy)	Best Classical Album	Nominated	
2014	Compassion (with Nigel Westlake & Lior)	Best Classical Album	Won	
2014	Gurrumul: His Life And Music (with Geoffrey Gurrumul Yunupingu)	Best Original Soundtrack, Cast or Show Album	Won	
2016	Live at the Sydney Opera House (with Josh Pyke)	Best Original Soundtrack, Cast or Show Album	Won	
2017	Ali's Wedding (soundtrack) (with Nigel Westlake & Joseph Tawadros, Slava Grigoryan & Lior)	Best Original Soundtrack, Cast or Show Album	Won	
2017	Live at the Sydney Opera House (with Kate Miller-Heidke)	Best Classical Album	Nominated	
2019	Nigel Westlake: Spirit of the Wild / Steve Reich: The Desert Music (with Diana Doherty, Nigel Westlake, David Robertson & Synergy Vocals)	Best Classical Album	Nominated	
2022	Ross Edwards: Frog and Star Cycle / Symphonies 2 & 3 (with Amy Dickson, Colin Currie, Lothar Koenigs, Yvonne Kenny, David Zinman & Markus Stenz & Melbourne Symphony Orchestra)	Best Classical Album	Nominated	
2025	Mahler: Symphony No. 2 / Barton: Of the Earth (with Simone Young)	Best Classical Album	Nominated	
2026	Mahler: Symphony No. 3 (with Simone Young)	Best Classical Album	Nominated	

=== Mo Awards ===
The Australian Entertainment Mo Awards (commonly known informally as the Mo Awards), were annual Australian entertainment industry awards. They recognise achievements in live entertainment in Australia from 1975 to 2016. Sydney Symphony Orchestra won one awards in that time.

Year	Nominee / work	Award	Result (wins only)
1989	Sydney Symphony Orchestra	Classical Performance of the Year	Won

=== National Live Music Awards ===
The National Live Music Awards (NLMAs) commenced in 2016 to recognise contributions to the live music industry in Australia.

Year	Nominee / work	Award	Result	Ref.
2023	Sydney Symphony Orchestra	Best Classical Act	Nominated	

== See also ==
- Symphony Services International
