= Daniel (Lior song) =

Single by Lior

from the album Autumn Flow
- Released: 2004
- Recorded: 2004
- Length: 3:50
- Label: Senso Unico
- Songwriter: Alex Laska
- Producer: François Tétaz

Lior singles chronology
"This Old Love" (2004)	"Daniel" (2004)	"Autumn Flow" (2005)

"Daniel" is a song written and recorded by Australian singer-songwriter Lior. It was released in 2004 as the second single from Lior's debut studio album Autumn Flow. The song is one of Lior's "signature songs".

At the APRA Music Awards of 2006, the song was nominated for Most Performed Blues & Roots Work.

== Track listing ==
Australian CD single (SENSOCD555)

1. "Daniel"
2. "This Old Love"
3. "Bedouin Song"
4. "Daniel" (Alt. Mix)

Dutch CD single

1. "Daniel" — 3:50
2. "Daniel" (Triple J Edit) — 3:11

== Release history ==
Region	Date	Format	Label
Australia	2004	CD	Senso Unico
Netherlands	2011	CD	Rough Trade
