= This Old Love =

- British 2006 CD single cover

Single by Lior

from the album Autumn Flow
- Released: 2004
- Recorded: 2004
- Length: 3:03
- Label: Senso Unico
- Songwriter: Alex Laska
- Producer: François Tétaz

Lior singles chronology
"Burying Chances" (2002)	"This Old Love" (2004)	"Daniel" (2004)

"This Old Love" is a song written and recorded by Australian singer-songwriter Lior. It was released in 2004 as the lead single from Lior's debut studio album Autumn Flow. The song was voted number 42 in the Triple J Hottest 100, 2004. the song is Lior's "signature song".

In April 2009, Jason Whittaker from Australian Stage described the song as a "chingly romantic single" and an "instant bridal waltz classic".

In 2011, the song was released in The Netherlands, where it peaked at number 53.

In 2018, HappyMag asked if he gets tired of singing it, with Lior responding "I only finish writing and record a song if I feel truly connected with it and love the lyric and music. Because my songs represent something real in my life, I don't tire of performing them because it is like revisiting a memory, or a person, and every time you perform it you look at it in a slightly different way or focus on a specific section and its meaning. Further to that, the way the audience connects and responds to it is always different. No two waves are the same."

The song was certified gold in Australia in 2025.

== Track listing ==
UK CD single

1. "This Old Love"
2. "Autumn Flow" (Acoustic Version)

Dutch CD single

1. "This Old Love" (edit) — 2:58
2. "This Old Love" (live version) — 3:25

== Charts ==
Weekly chart performance of "This Old Love"
Chart (2011)	Peak position
Netherlands (Single Top 100)	53

== Certifications ==
Region	Certification	Certified units/sales
Australia (ARIA)	Gold	35,000^{‡}
^{‡} Sales+streaming figures based on certification alone.

== Release history ==
Region	Date	Format	Label
Australia	2004	Radio	Senso Unico
United Kingdom	2006	CD	Red Ink
Netherlands	2011	CD, CD_ROM	Rough Trade
