= Miss World Malta =

Beauty pageant

- Formation: 1965; 61 years ago
- Purpose: Beauty pageant
- Headquarters: Valletta
- Location: Malta
- Official language: Maltese
- Affiliations: Miss World
- Website: www.missworldmalta.com

Miss World Malta is a national Beauty pageant for selecting a delegate to represent Malta at the Miss World pageant. This pageant is not related to Miss Malta pageant.

== History ==
The winners of the national pageant are selected at different competitions as each is owned by a different organization. Usually, the Miss World Malta is held by midsummer every year, and sends the winner of this contest to Miss World to be happened in the later months of the year. The current winner of this pageant is Joanna Galea from Zejtun, 23 years old, who also represented Malta in Miss Italia Nel Mondo 2011 Edition. As of 2009, Malta has claimed only one semi-finalist in Miss World.

From 1965 to 2001, representatives were sent to Miss World under the national pageant, Miss Malta. A new organization had launched in 2002 to send its delegates to the Miss World pageant, under the name, Miss World Malta.

== Titleholders ==
Color key

- Declared the Winner
- Finished as a runner-up
- Finished as one of the finalists or semifinalists

Year	Miss World Malta	Represented	Placement
1965	Wilhelmina Mallia	Paola	
1966	Monica Sunnura	Santa Venera	
1968	Ursulina Grech	Gozo	
1969	Mary Brincat	Sliema	Top 15
1970	Tessa Marthese Galea	Sliema	
1971	Doris Abdilla	Paola	
1972	Jane Attard	Gozo	
1973	Carmen Farrugia	Żebbuġ	
1974	Mary Louise Ellul	Sliema	
1975	Marie Grace Ciantar	Kalkara	
1976	Jane Benedicta Saliba	Żurrieq	
1977	Pauline Lewise Farrugia	Żebbuġ	
1978	Mary Cumbo	Birkirkara	
1979	Elena Christine Abela	Sliema	
1980	Frances Duca	Fgura	
1981	Elizabeth Mary Fenech	Żebbuġ	
1982	Adelina Camilleri	Mosta	
1983	Odette Balzan	Rabat	
1984	Graziella Attard Previ	Gżira	
1985	Kristina Apap Bologna	Mdina	
1986	Andrea Josephine Licari	Floriana	
1987	Michelle Sciberras	Paola	
1988	Josette Camilleri	Marsa	
1989	Marika Micallef	Għargħur	
1990	Karen Demicoli	Żejtun	
1991	Romina Genuis	Gżira	
1992	Noelene Micallef	Fgura	
1993	Susanne Mary Borg	Valletta	
1997	Sarah Vella	Kerċem	
1998	Rebecca Camilleri	Pembroke	
1999	Catharine Attard	Żejtun	
2000	Katia Grima	Qormi	
2001	Christine Camilleri	Fgura	
2002	Joyce Gatt	Balzan	
2003	Rachel Xuereb	St. Paul's Bay	
2004	Antonella Vella	Mosta	
2005	Ferdine Fava	St. Julian's	
2006	Janice Gauci	Żabbar	Did not compete
2007	Stephanie Zammit	Żejtun	
2008	Martha Fenech	St. Julian's	
2009	Shanel Debattista	Pieta	
2010	Francesca Gaspar	Iklin	
2011	Claire-Marie Busuttil	Ħaż-Żabbar	
2012	Daniela Darmanin	Mġarr	
2013	Donna Borg Leyland	Attard	
2014	Joanna Galea	Valletta	
2015	Katrina Pavia	Victoria	
2016	Anthea Zammit	Żebbuġ	Miss World Talent (Top 10); Miss World Sport (3rd Place)
2017	Michela Galea	Mġarr	Top 40; Miss World Talent
2018	Maria Ellul	Valletta	
2019	Nicole Vella	Rabat	Miss World Talent (Top 5)
2020	Due to the impact of COVID-19 pandemic, no pageant in 2020		
2021	Naomi Dingli	Valletta	Miss World Sport (Top 32)
2022	Miss World 2021 was rescheduled to 16 March 2022 due to the COVID-19 pandemic outbreak in Puerto Rico, no edition started in 2022		
2023	Natalia Galea	Valletta	Unplaced
2024	No competition held		
2025	Martine Cutajar	Attard	Unplaced
2026	Nicole Spiteri	Marsa	TBA
2027	Suwaida Bugeja	Żejtun	TBA

== See also ==
- Miss Malta
