= Slava Grigoryan =

Australian musician

- Born: Kazakh SSR, Soviet Union
- Occupations: classical guitarist and recording artist
- Known for: Grigoryan Brothers
- Spouses: Sharon Draper (m. 2016)
- Children: 3

Slava Grigoryan (born 21 January 1976 in Soviet Kazakhstan) is an Australian classical guitarist and recording artist. He frequently collaborates and performs with his younger brother, fellow guitarist Leonard Grigoryan, performing as the Grigoryan Brothers.

== Early life and career ==
Slava Grigoryan was born in the Kazakh Soviet Socialist Republic to violinists Eduard and Irina Grigoryan. The Armenian family emigrated to Melbourne, Australia, when he was 4 years old. Eduard Grigoryan gave his sons Slava and Leonard early guitar lessons. At the age of 12, Slava Grigoryan played the instrument professionally. He pursued classical music and studied at the Victorian College of the Arts in Melbourne. In 1993, he won the Tokyo International Classical Guitar Competition. Grigoryan signed with Sony Music Entertainment in 1995 for whom he released four solo albums.

He changed labels to ABC Classics in 2001 and subsequently released another solo album and an album recorded with his younger brother, Leonard. Frequent collaborators, the pair perform as Grigoryan Brothers and have released five albums, all of which have been nominated for ARIA Awards. In 2014 Grigoryan Brothers released This Time which has been well reviewed. Some of their previous releases include The Seasons and Distance.

Grigoryan also joined with fellow Australian musicians Anthony Field, Karin Schaupp and Gareth Koch to release albums under the group name Saffire. Field was later replaced by Leonard (see Saffire article).

He has been artistic director of the Adelaide Guitar Festival since 2010.

== Personal life ==
Grigoryan has two children Isabella and Paolo from his first marriage. He married cellist Sharon Draper in December 2016 and their son Sebastian was born in July 2018.

== Discography ==
List of albums, with Australian chart positions
Title	Album details	Peak chart positions
Title	Album details	AUS
Spirit of Spain	Released: June 1995; Label: Sony Masterworks (SMK68351); Format: CD	93
Dance of the Angel	Released: August 1997; Label: Sony Classic (SK63011); Format: CD	35
Another Night in London	Released: June 1999; Label: Sony Classic (SK61871); Format: CD	90
Live In Recital	Released: 2000; Label: Sony Classic (SK89447); Format: CD; Recorded live in 1996/97	—
Sonatas & Fantasies	Released: April 2002; Label: ABC Classics (472 2242); Format: CD	54
Play (with Leonard Grigoryan)	Released: May 2003; Label: ABC Classics (472 8242); Format: CD, digital download	58
Brazil (with Jane Rutter)	Released: February 2004; Label: ABC Classics (476 1560); Format: CD, digital download	66
Afterimage	Released: 2004; Label: ABC Classics (476 2271); Format: CD, digital download	—
Rodrigo Guitar Concertos (with Leonard Grigoryan)	Released: 2005; Label: ABC Classics (476 8072); Format: CD, digital download	—
Shadow Dances: Music for Guitar By Nigel Westlake (with Nigel Westlake)	Released: 2006; Label: ABC Classics (476 5744); Format: CD, digital download	—
Impressions (with Leonard Grigoryan)	Released: 2007; Label: ABC Classics (476 6088); Format: CD, digital download	—
From a Dream (As MGT, Muthspiel, Grigoryan, Towner)	Released: 2008; Label: Which Way Music (WWM004); Format: CD, digital download	—
Baroque Guitar Concertos (As The Grigoryan Brothers)	Released: 2008; Label: ABC Classics (476 5948); Format: CD, digital download	—
Distance (As The Grigoryan Brothers)	Released: 2009; Label: Which Way Music (WWM 006); Format: CD, digital download	—
Band of Brothers (As Slava & Leonard Grigoryan and Joseph & James Tawadros)	Released: 2011; Label: ABC Classics (476 4316); Format: CD, digital download	
My Latin Heart (By José Carbó with Slava and Leonard Grigoryan)	Released: 2012; Label: ABC Classics; Format: CD, digital download	
Travel Guide (with Ralph Towner & Wolfgang Muthspiel)	Released: 2013; Label: ECM Records (ECM 2310); Format: CD, digital download	
This Time (As The Grigoryan Brothers)	Released: March 2014; Label: Which Way Music; Format: CD, digital download	
The Seasons (As The Grigoryan Brothers with Pyotr Ilyich Tchaikovsky)	Released: 2014; Label: Material Records (MRE 041); Format: CD, digital download	
Bach Cello Suites, Volume I	Released: November 2016; Label: ABC Classics (481 4553); Format: CD, digital download	
Songs Without Words (As The Grigoryan Brothers)	Released: April 2017; Label: ABC Classics (481 5101); Format: CD, digital download	
Migration (with The Australian String Quartet )	Released: May 2017; Label: ABC Classics (481 5428); Format: CD, digital download	
Ali's Wedding (soundtrack) (with Nigel Westlake, Sydney Symphony Orchestra, Joseph Tawadros and Lior)	Released: September 2017; Label: ABC Classics (481 5738); Format: CD, digital download	
Bach Cello Suites, Volume II	Released: November 2017; Label: ABC Classics (481 6472); Format: CD, digital download	
Bach Concertos (As The Grigoryan Brothers with Adelaide Symphony Orchestra and Benjamin Northey)	Released: 2018; Label: ABC Classics (481 6926); Format: CD, digital download	
The Thee Cornered Hat: Music of Falla, Rodrigo and Granados (with Southern Cross Soloists)	Released: 2018; Label: ABC Classics; Format: CD, digital download	
A Boy Called Sailboat (soundtrack) (As The Grigoryan Brothers)	Released: 2019; Label: ABC Classics (481 8406); Format: CD, digital download	
Our Place (with Sharon Grigoryan)	Released: 2019; Label: ABC Classics (481 8406); Format: CD, digital download	
This Is Us (A Musical Reflection of Australia) (As The Grigoryan Brothers)	Released: March 2021; Label: ABC Classics (485 5753); Format: CD, digital download	
Gratitudes	Released: May 2023; Label: Hush Foundation; Format: CD, digital download	

== Awards and recognition ==
In addition to his achievement in the Tokyo International Classical Guitar Competition, he has won a number of awards including Young Australian of the Year for the Arts in 1998, the Mo award for Instrumentalist of the Year in 2001.

In 2000 he appeared as a soloist with the Australian Chamber Orchestra and was part of the 2000 Sydney Olympics Arts Festival.

=== AIR Awards ===
The Australian Independent Record Awards (commonly known informally as AIR Awards) is an annual awards night to recognise, promote and celebrate the success of Australia's Independent Music sector.

Year	Nominee / work	Award	Result
2017	Bach Cello Suites Vol 1	Best Independent Classical Album	Won
2018	Bach: Cello Suites Volume II	Best Independent Classical Album	Nominated
2019	Bach Concertos (as Grigoryan Brothers with Adelaide Symphony Orchestra and Benjamin Northey)	Best Independent Classical Album	Won
2022	This Is Us: A Musical Reflection of Australia (as Grigoryan Brothers)	Best Independent Classical Album or EP	Nominated
2024	Gratitudes	Best Independent Classical Album or EP	Nominated

=== ARIA Awards ===
The ARIA Music Awards are presented annually from 1987 by the Australian Recording Industry Association (ARIA). Slava Grigoryan won his first ARIA Music Award for Sonatas & Fantasies in 2002. In total, he has won four.

Year	Nominee / work	Award	Result
1995	Spirit of Spain	Best Classical Album	Nominated
1998	Dance of the Angels	Best Classical Album	Nominated
2002	Sonatas & Fantasies	Best Classical Album	Won
2003	Play (Slava Grigoryan and Leonard Grigoryan)	Best Classical Album	Nominated
2004	Brazil (Slava Grigoryan and Jane Rutter)	Best World Music Album	Nominated
2005	Afterimage	Best Classical Album	Nominated
2006	Rodrigo Guitar Concertos (Slava Grigoryan, Leonard Grigoryan, Queensland Orchestra, Brett Kelly)	Best Classical Album	Nominated
2007	Impressions (Slava Grigoryan and Leonard Grigoryan)	Best Classical Album	Nominated
2008	Baroque Guitar Concertos (Slava Grigoryan, Tasmanian Symphony Orchestra, Benjamin Northey)	Best Classical Album	Nominated
2009	Distance (Slava Grigoryan and Leonard Grigoryan)	Best Classical Album	Nominated
2011	Band of Brothers (Slava Grigoryan, Leonard Grigoryan, Joseph Tawadros, James Tawadros)	Best World Music Album	Nominated
2012	My Latin Heart (Jose Carbo with Slava Grigoryan and Leonard Grigoryan)	Best Classical Album	Nominated
2015	This Time (Grigoryan Brothers)	Best Classical Album	Nominated
2017	Bach: Cello Suites Volume I	Best Classical Album	Won
2017	Songs Without Words (Grigoryan Brothers)	Best Classical Album	Nominated
2017	Ali's Wedding (soundtrack) (Nigel Westlake & Sydney Symphony Orchestra, with Joseph Tawadros, Slava Grigoryan & Lior)	Best Original Soundtrack or Musical Theatre Cast Album	Won
2018	Bach: Cello Suites Volume II	Best Classical Album	Won
2019	Bach Concertos (Grigoryan Brothers, Adelaide Symphony Orchestra & Benjamin Northey)	Best Classical Album	Nominated
2020	Our Place: Duets for Cello and Guitar	Best Classical Album	Nominated
2020	A Boy Called Sailboat (Grigoryan Brothers)	Best Original Soundtrack or Musical Theatre Cast Album	Nominated
2021	This Is Us (A Musical Reflection of Australia) (Grigoryan Brothers)	Best Classical Album	Nominated
2024	Amistad - Music For Two Guitars (Grigoryan Brothers)	Best Classical Album	Nominated

=== Mo Awards ===
The Australian Entertainment Mo Awards (commonly known informally as the Mo Awards), were annual Australian entertainment industry awards. They recognise achievements in live entertainment in Australia from 1975 to 2016. Slava Grigoryan won two awards in that time.

Year	Nominee / work	Award	Result (wins only)
2000	Slava Grigoryan	Instrumental Performer of the Year	Won
2004	Slava Grigoryan	Instrumental Performer of the Year	Won

=== South Australian Music Awards ===
The South Australian Music Awards (previously known as the Fowler's Live Music Awards) are annual awards that exist to recognise, promote and celebrate excellence in the South Australian contemporary music industry. They commenced in 2012.

Year	Nominee / work	Award	Result (wins only)
2019	Slava and Leonard Grigoryan with Beijing Duo	Best International Collaboration	Won
