= Brett Kelly (businessman) =

Australian businessman, author, and entrepreneur

Brett Kelly is an Australian businessman, author, and entrepreneur. Brett is the founder and CEO of Kelly Partners Group Holdings Ltd (ASX: KPG).

== Biography ==
Brett Kelly holds a bachelor's degree in business from University of Technology Sydney and a master's degree in taxation from the University of New South Wales. He is also qualified as a chartered accountant and registered tax agent.

Brett Kelly wrote his first book, Collective Wisdom: Prominent Australians On Success and the Future, which ended up being a bestseller.

In 2006 Brett Kelly founded Kelly Partners Group Holdings. In 2017, he listed his accounting firm on the Australian Stock Exchange (ASX) with the backing of Ellerston Capital.

Brett Kelly also founded Kelly+Partners Scholars Foundation, which is pioneered with Moriah College in a 10-year agreement.

== Books ==
- Kelly, Brett. (1998). Collective Wisdom: Prominent Australians On Success and the Future (1st ed). Clown Publishing. ISBN 978-0646349992.
- Kelly, Brett. (2005). Universal Wisdom: Finding Answers to Life's Ultimate Questions. Clown Publishing. ISBN 978-0646451848.
- Kelly, Brett. (2012). Business Owners Wisdom: Great Business Owners Speak Their Minds. Clown Publishing. ISBN 978-0980776539.
- Kelly, Brett. (2020). Your Money, Your Choice: 20 Steps to Organise, Plan and Achieve Your Financial Goals. Clown Publishing. ASIN B085QG76CW.
- Kelly, Brett. (2021). Investment Wisdom: Great Australian investors share their stories. Clown Publishing. ISBN 978-0980776553.

== Personal life ==
Brett Kelly is a father of three children.
