= Leonard Grigoryan =

- Instrument: guitar

Leonard Grigoryan is an Australian classical guitarist and recording artist of Armenian heritage. He is the younger brother of fellow guitarist Slava Grigoryan, with whom he often plays in a duo as the Grigoryan Brothers.

== Life and career ==
Of Armenian heritage, Leonard and his elder brother Slava often play in a duo as the Grigoryan Brothers.

Leonard's first solo album, entitled Solo, was released through Which Way Music in 2012.

== Discography ==
=== Albums ===
Title	Details
Play (with Slava Grigoryan)	Released: 2003; Label: ABC Classics (472 8242); Format: CD, digital download
Rodrigo Guitar Concertos (with Slava Grigoryan, Queensland Orchestra & Brett Kelly)	Released: 2005; Label: ABC Classics (476 8072); Format: CD, digital download
Impressions (with Slava Grigoryan)	Released: 2007; Label: ABC Classics (476 6088); Format: CD, digital download
Distance (As The Grigoryan Brothers)	Released: 2009; Label: Which Way Music (WWM 006); Format: CD, digital download
Band of Brothers (As Slava & Leonard Grigoryan and Joseph & James Tawadros)	Released: 2011; Label: ABC Classics (476 4316); Format: CD, digital download
My Latin Heart (By José Carbó with Slava and Leonard Grigoryan)	Released: 2012; Label: ABC Classics; Format: CD, digital download
Solo	Released: 2012; Label: Which Way Music (WWM017); Format: CD, digital download
This Time (As The Grigoryan Brothers)	Released: March 2014; Label: Which Way Music; Format: CD, digital download
The Seasons (As The Grigoryan Brothers with Pyotr Ilyich Tchaikovsky)	Released: 2014; Label: Material Records (MRE 041); Format: CD, digital download
Songs Without Words (As The Grigoryan Brothers)	Released: April 2017; Label: ABC Classics (481 5101); Format: CD, digital download
Bach Concertos (As The Grigoryan Brothers with Adelaide Symphony Orchestra and Benjamin Northey)	Released: 2018; Label: ABC Classics (481 6926); Format: CD, digital download
A Boy Called Sailboat (soundtrack) (As The Grigoryan Brothers)	Released: 2019; Label: ABC Classics (481 8406); Format: CD, digital download
This Is Us (A Musical Reflection of Australia) (As The Grigoryan Brothers)	Released: March 2021; Label: ABC Classics (485 5753); Format: CD, digital download

== Awards ==
=== ARIA Awards ===
The ARIA Music Awards are presented annually from 1987 by the Australian Recording Industry Association (ARIA). Grigoryan has received 8 nominations, either as a member of Grigoryan Brothers, or shared with other artists (including his brother Slava).

Year	Nominee / work	Award	Result
2003	Play (Slava Grigoryan and Leonard Grigoryan)	Best Classical Album	Nominated
2006	Rodrigo Guitar Concertos (Slava Grigoryan, Leonard Grigoryan, Queensland Orchestra, Brett Kelly)	Best Classical Album	Nominated
2007	Impressions (Slava Grigoryan and Leonard Grigoryan)	Best Classical Album	Nominated
2009	Distance (Slava Grigoryan and Leonard Grigoryan)	Best Classical Album	Nominated
2011	Band of Brothers (Slava Grigoryan, Leonard Grigoryan, Joseph Tawadros, James Tawadros)	Best World Music Album	Nominated
2012	My Latin Heart (Jose Carbo with Slava Grigoryan and Leonard Grigoryan)	Best Classical Album	Nominated
2015	This Time (Grigoryan Brothers)	Best Classical Album	Nominated
2020	A Boy Called Sailboat (Grigoryan Brothers)	Best Original Soundtrack, Cast or Show Album	Nominated

=== AIR Awards ===
The Australian Independent Record Awards (commonly known informally as AIR Awards) is an annual awards night to recognise, promote and celebrate the success of Australia's Independent Music sector.

Year	Nominee / work	Award	Result
2019	Bach Concertos (as Grigoryan Brothers with Adelaide Symphony Orchestra and Benjamin Northey)	Best Independent Classical Album	Won

=== South Australian Music Awards ===
The South Australian Music Awards (previously known as the Fowler's Live Music Awards) are annual awards that exist to recognise, promote and celebrate excellence in the South Australian contemporary music industry. They commenced in 2012.

Year	Nominee / work	Award	Result (wins only)
2019	Slava Grigoryan and Leonard with Beijing Duo	Best International Collaboration	Won
