= Songs of the Latin Skies =

Studio album by Katie Noonan and Karin Schaupp
- Released: 17 February 2017
- Genre: Jazz, classical music, pop
- Label: Kin Music
- Producer: Katie Noonan and Karin Schaupp

Katie Noonan chronology
With Love and Fury (2016)	Songs of the Latin Skies (2017)	Gratitude and Grief (2018)

Karin Schaupp chronology
Mosaic (2014)	Songs of the Latin Skies (2017)	Wayfaring (2018)

Songs of the Latin Skies is a collobrative studio album by Australian singer and songwriter Katie Noonan and classical guitarist Karin Schaupp. The album was released in February 2017 and is the third time the duo have collaborated, following Songs from the British Isles in 2011 and the ARIA nominated album Songs of the Southern Skies in 2012.

The album is described as a "journey through the great South American songbook of bossa nova, samba, salsa and tango, interpreting work by Heitor Villa-Lobos, Luis Bonfá, Antônio Carlos Jobim and more." Noonan and Schaupp toured the album across Australia between March–June 2017.

At the ARIA Music Awards of 2017, the album won ARIA Award for Best World Music Album.

== Reception ==
Jo Litson from LimeLight magazine gave the album 4 ½ out of 5 saying; "The duo bring a fresh, distinctive, original take to the repertoire, with Noonan’s exquisite vocals soaring delicately over Schaupp’s virtuosic, equally expressive playing, as they caress the melodies to create a meltingly laid-back album with a spare, minimal beauty that would soothe the most furrowed brow." adding it's "Divine".

== Track listing ==
1. "Segurança" (Maxwell) – 4:00
2. "Desafinado" (Antônio Carlos Jobim) – 4:34
3. "Oblivion" (Ástor Piazzolla) – 5:53
4. "Wave" (Antônio Carlos Jobim) – 3:38
5. "Boiou" (Joyce Moreno) – 2:38
6. "Retrato Brasileiro" (Baden Powell) – 4:05
7. "No More Blues" (Antônio Carlos Jobim) – 3:47
8. "Canta Mais" (Antônio Carlos Jobim) – 4:39
9. "La Muerte del Angel" (Ástor Piazzolla) – 4:03
10. "Manhã de Carnaval" (Luiz Bonfá) – 4:54
11. "Sentimental Melody from Forest of the Amazon" (Heitor Villa-Lobos) – 4:10
12. "El Marino" (Antonio Lauro) – 1:22
13. "Tikata Tarpuinikichu" (Traditional) – 4:48

== Release history ==
Region	Date	Format	Label	Catalogue
Australia	17 February 2017	CD; digital download	Kin Music	5743174
