= With Love and Fury =

Studio album by Brodsky Quartet and Katie Noonan
- Released: 19 April 2016
- Recorded: London
- Label: Kin Music Australia

Katie Noonan chronology
Transmutant (2015)	With Love and Fury (2016)	Songs of the Latin Skies (2017)

With Love and Fury is a collaborative studio album by British string quartet the Brodsky Quartet and Australian singer songwriter Katie Noonan. The album has been described as a fusion of their styles into an incredibly composed and creative collaboration.

The album is a reimagining of the words of Australian poet Judith Wright and features compositions from contemporary Australian composers including Carl Vine, Elena Kats-Chernin, Richard Tognetti, Iain Grandage, Andrew Ford, David Hirschfelder, Paul Grabowsky, Paul Dean and John Rodgers.

The project combines several of Noonan's passions; contemporary Australian composition and the work of iconic Queensland poet Judith Wright. The title, With Love and Fury, is named after the manner in which Wright habitually signed off her letters. Noonan said that "The idea was born from a love and deep appreciation of Judith Wright's writing and the legacy she left for Australia that seems so pertinent today" ... "She was such an advocate for the environment and also such a fierce supporter of reconciliation between Indigenous and non-Indigenous Australians."

The Brodsky Quartet and Noonan toured the album around Australia from 28 April until 5 May 2016.

At the ARIA Music Awards of 2016, the album was nominated for Best Classical album, losing to Live with the Melbourne Symphony Orchestra by Flight Facilities.

== Background and release ==
Noonan had met Paul Cassidy of the quartet in Brisbane in 2011, while both were performing at the Queensland Music Festival. Noonan's original idea was to create a project celebrating the work of Australian poet and cartoonist Michael Leunig but distance made writing together difficult.

In 2013, Noonan found herself in Fortitude Valley, Brisbane, at the Judith Wright Centre: "I realised with great embarrassment that I didn’t actually know who Wright was. So I went inside, found an anthology of her poetry and read it cover to cover. Her work just blew me away." With financial support from the Australia Council, Noonan set about choosing the project's composers and poems. She got in touch with Cassidy again and then flew to London to record the album with the quartet.

Noonan said of the collaboration that "I am so thrilled with the outcome of this project and believe we have created a truly beautiful and significant body of uniquely Australian work and I can't wait to share this new music with you on our World Premiere Australia tour in April/May. Ever since I first heard the Brodsky Quartet with Elvis Costello on the seminal album The Juliet Letters and ... with one of my musical idols Bjork, it has been a dream of mine to sing with this incredible string ensemble." Paul Cassidy of the quartet said that "We are so happy to be working with Katie Noonan, and are proud to be involved in this wonderful new Australian song cycle in memory of the inspirational Judith Wright."

== Critical reception ==
A reviewer from Australian Stage said that "Poetry has often been the inspiration for Noonan’s work. In 2011, with her trio Elixir, she recorded Australian Thomas Shapcott's poems ... This time it is Wright’s poetry that has been set to music. [They] all capture the sunlight and shadow of Wright's poetry, its joy and despair, with Noonan’s voice swooping and soaring within a web of finely balanced delicate string parts."

A reviewer from Sounds of Oz said that Noonan has "created what is arguably one of her most ambitious albums to date with her new release With Love and Fury ... I'm still not sure this is the kind of music I'll reach for time and time again. It's just so different, with songs that veer wildly from the classic structure of verses and choruses. While that meant I struggled to get into some songs, others really moved me. This album is brave and creative. And in a musical landscape that has a little too much beige, those virtues count for something."

== Track listing ==
1. "Late Spring" - 4:08
2. "To a Child" - 4:57
3. "Sonnet for Christmas" - 9:01
4. "After the Visitors" - 3:27
5. "The Surfer" - 6:16
6. "Night after Bushfire" - 6:59
7. "The Company of Lovers" - 4:25
8. "Failure of Communication" - 4:46
9. "The Slope" - 6:22
10. "Metho Drinker" - 5:37

== Release history ==
Region	Date	Format	Label	Catalogue
Australia	19 April 2016	CD; digital download	Kin Music Australia	4784979
