= Melody Pool =

Australian country-folk musician

- Melody Pool at the Murwillumbah Citadel, 2026

Background information
- Born: Melody Jane Pool; 1991 or 1992 (age 34–35)
- Origin: Kurri Kurri, New South Wales, Australia
- Genres: Country, folk
- Instruments: Vocal, acoustic guitar, guitar
- Labels: Liberation/Universal, Bloodlines
- Website: melodypool.com.au

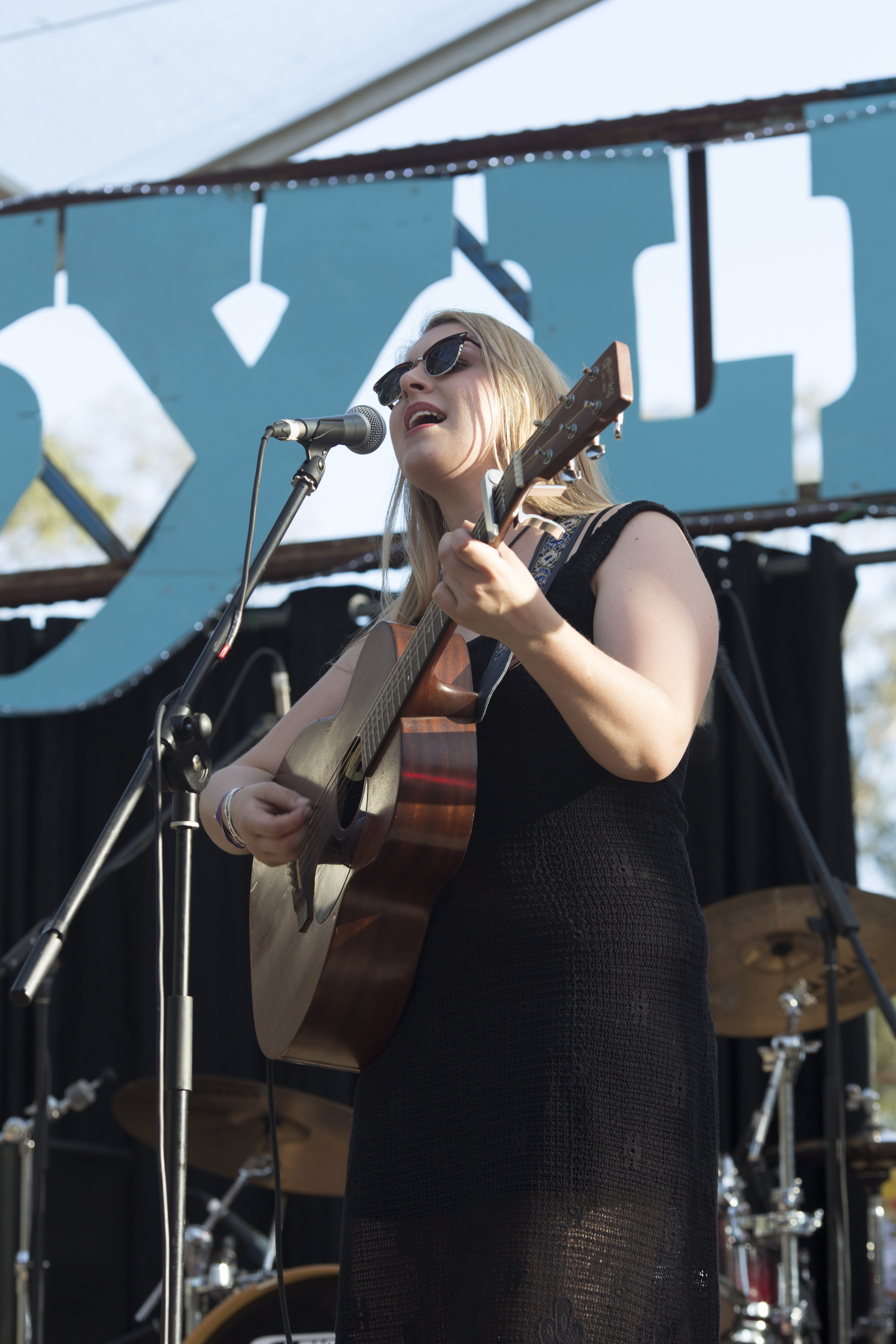
Melody Pool at the Dashville Skyline, 2015

Melody Jane Pool (born 1991 or 1992), is an Australian country-folk musician from Kurri Kurri, New South Wales. Her second studio album, Deep Dark Savage Heart (2016) reached the ARIA albums chart top 50. Pool has issued two other studio albums, The Hurting Scene (2013) and Our Eternal Garden (2025).

== Biography ==
Melody Jane Pool, was born in 1991 or 1992 and raised in Kurri Kurri by her mother, Annie and father, Alby Pool. She first performed on stage with her father when she was 8 years old. Her first solo show was at age 9. During her teens Pool toured Australia as a member of her father's country music band. She made her debut recording on the bonus track, "Bridle Hanging on the Wall" for her father's fourth album, Back in the Swing (2004). Keith Glass of Country Music Capital News felt, "[she] does a delightful job on it and you can add her to a growing list of young country singers obviously entranced by old time country."

Pool independently released her debut extended play (EP), Heart to Heart Talk, in 2008. This was followed by another EP Awake, You’re All Around Me in 2011, before she crowdfunded money to travel to Nashville in September 2012 to record her debut album The Hurting Scene. Produced by Brad Jones and Jace Everett, the album was recorded in six days and was issued by March 2013. It reached No. 40 on the ARIA Digital Albums and No. 5 on ARIA Hitseekers Albums charts in that month. Initially released independently, Pool was then signed to Liberation Music and Mushroom Music Publishing, which reissued the album in July 2013.

In 2014 she covered Joni Mitchell's "River" for Katie Noonan's collaborative album Songs That Made Me. The album reached No. 7 on the ARIA Compilation Chart in October 2014. Also in that year, Pool undertook a co-headline tour with New Zealand-born artist Marlon Williams, playing 26 shows around Australia and New Zealand. After moving to Coburg, Victoria, Pool began writing her next album Deep Dark Savage Heart, which was released in April 2016. The album peaked at No. 49 on ARIA Albums chart in the following month. It was listed at No. 50 on Rolling Stone Australia's 50 Best Albums of 2016, which "plummeted the deepest and darkest of emotions... As blunt lyrically as she is poetic, [her] alt-country-leaning songs and heavenly voice remain a thing of deep, dark beauty."

Following its release and subsequent tour, Pool announced a pause in her music career to address her mental health. She described her anxiety and depression on ABC's Australian Story in a 2017 episode, "Unchained Melody". In 2020 Pool revealed she was recording a new album on a farm in regional NSW, and began playing new songs live in 2021. Six years after her last release, her next EP, Lost in Time, appeared in 2023 and was followed by her third studio album, Our Eternal Garden, in July 2025. The latter peaked at No. 4 on the ARIA Australian Country Albums chart.

== Discography ==
=== Albums ===
List of albums, with selected details and selected chart positions
Title	Album details	Peak chart positions
Title	Album details	AUS
The Hurting Scene	Released: March 2013; Format: CD, LP, digital; Label: Weston Boys Entertainment, Independent (859709575391)	— (Note: The Hurting Scene did not reach the ARIA Albums chart top 100, but peaked at No. 40 on the ARIA Digital Albums and No. 5 on ARIA Hitseekers Albums charts.)
Deep Dark Savage Heart	Released: April 2016; Format: CD, digital; Label: Liberation Music/Universal (LMCD0287)	49
Our Eternal Garden	Released: 31 July 2025; Format: CD, digital; Label: Melody Pool	— (Note: Our Eternal Garden did not reach the ARIA Albums chart top 100, but peaked at No. 4 on the ARIA Australian Country Albums chart.)

=== Extended plays ===
List of EPs, with selected details
Title	Details
Heart to Heart Talk	Released: 2008; Format: CD, digital; Label: Melody Pool
You’re All Around Me	Released: 2011; Format: CD, digital; Label: Melody Pool
Lost in Time	Released: 2023; Format: CD, digital; Label: Melody Pool

== Awards and nominations ==
=== National Live Music Awards ===
The National Live Music Awards (NLMAs) commenced in 2016 to recognise contributions to the live music industry in Australia.

Year	Nominee / work	Award	Result	Ref.
2023	Melody Pool	Best Folk Act	Nominated	

=== Telstra Road to Discovery ===
- 2013 - Songwriter of the Year
