= Songbook (Katie Noonan album) =

Studio album by Katie Noonan
- Released: 13 January 2013
- Recorded: September–October 2012
- Label: Kin Music

Katie Noonan chronology
Songs of the Southern Skies (2012)	Songbook (2013)	Fierce Hearts (2014)

Songbook is a studio album by Australian musician, Katie Noonan, released in January 2013. Songbook sees Katie exploring material from throughout her career including songs from george, Elixir and her solo albums as well as five new tracks.

In a statement Noonan said; "This is a selection of songs from the last 15 years of my life. It has been really interesting going through these works and seeing my evolution as a musician and my journey from a girl to a young woman through to a wife and mother." "Spawn" was written by 'a 19-year-old girl facing the world and confronting the loss of innocence', elsewhere, "Special Ones" speaks of 'self-respect and empowerment' while "Love's My Song For You" is a tribute to 'then boyfriend, now husband and soul mate Zac,' father of Katie's sons.

"Then there are five new songs that hadn't really found a home until this particular record," including a short piano piece. "I couldn't come up with a title, so I just called it "Untitled".. It's nice to have a little instrumental moment that was something different and a break from the vocals as well."

An accompanying book of sheet music Songbook – The Book was also released. It features sheet music, anecdotes and rare photos. "That's something I've been meaning to do for years, because people often ask me for music, so with that I went even more into the songs and where I was and what they were about when I wrote them."

Noonan toured the album nationally from March–May 2013.

== Reviews ==
Bree Cohen from the Music Au gave the album 9.2 out of 10 saying, "The album opens with the stunning “Quiet Day” which immediately summarizes the tone that this album will take. It is simply stated with piano accompaniment and sparse strings in the climax points." adding "What makes this album something truly special is how effortless these sparse yet lush arrangements are for the singer. They showcase her voice to its fullest and best."

Carley Hall of The Music said "Some tracks delight in their new setting, while others come off sounding oddly hamstrung by some of the orchestration that, really, should augment them to greater heights, and it's particularly and sadly true of the older hits. For instance, the George inclusions like "Special Ones", "Breathe In Now" and "Spawn" lack that edgy, feisty attitude they debuted with. But the dramatic strings that haunt "Quiet Day" and "Bluebird" fit extremely well beside Katie's piano and pitch-perfect vocal."

== Track listing ==
1. "Quiet Day" - 2:56
2. "Sweet One" - 4:48
3. "Breathe In Now" - 3:56
4. "Bluebird" - 3:54
5. "Special Ones" - 4:03
6. "Tip Of Memory" - 5:08
7. "Slowly" - 3:31
8. "Love’s My Song For You" 4:40
9. "Emperor’s Box" - 4:07
10. "Spawn" - 4:15
11. "Untitled" - 2:04
12. "My Own Time" - 4:11
13. "Time" - 4:54
14. "Janet" - 3:45
15. "Let You In" - 4:27
