= Transmutant =

Studio album by Katie Noonan
- Released: 24 July 2015
- Label: Kin Music Australia / Universal Music Australia

Katie Noonan chronology
Songs That Made Me (2014)	Transmutant (2015)	With Love and Fury (2015)

Transmutant is a studio album by Australian singer songwriter Katie Noonan and the Vanguard. It is her sixth solo album and seventeenth album she's been involved with in total. The album peaked at number 33 in Australia.

Transmutant is Katie's first contemporary release since 2010's Katie Noonan and the Captains and features a cast of musicians including Stu Hunter, Declan Kelly, Bree Van Reyk, Cameron Deyell, Miro Lauritz, Manu Delago and more.

The album was funded through an online Pledge campaign, in which her fans demonstrated their faith oversubscribing it in two days. No doubt aided by a post from Sia directing her fans to Noonan's SoundCloud page and saying "My friend Katie sure can sing!".

Noonan toured the album nationally throughout October and November 2015.

== Background and release ==
Noonan explained the title "it’s about transformation and change and it feels like a lot of people have been feeling the same things that I’ve been feeling. A lot of growth, necessary growth and not particularly easy growth, but good growth; I’ve observed it in my life and my friends life and lots of people. It seems to be a common thing which seems to connect with people, which is awesome."

Noonan said the songs on the album are the most personal in her long career and said age and experience has made her less inclined to hide behind her lyrics. "It has been a pretty tough few years for me and my girlfriends, a very tumultuous, emotional time. Fortunately, everyone has come through the other side now," she says. Many of the songs on Transmutant were inspired by the pain of others — her husband Zac after his mentor died ("Gratitude"), her best friend Nina ("Broken") and a man crying as he farewelled his daughters at the airport ("Goodbyes"). But "The last song on the album, "Cloud Of Home" is one of the happiest songs I’ve ever written. That song is for my boys," Noonan says.

== Reception ==
Professional ratings
Review scores
Source	Rating
Rolling Stone Australia	4/5 stars
Sydney Morning Herald	3/5 stars
The Music AU	1.5/5 stars

Michael Wilton of Rolling Stone AUS gave the album 4 out of 5 saying; "Noonan's voice is an exquisite instrument – especially on "An Unwinnable Race" – and while her hymnal ballads can become a little too even-tempered, she confidently experiments with off-kilter rhythms and whimsical pop. And on "In the Name Of the Father", a duet with Jordan White, she produces one of the most haunting moments of her career."

Bernard Zuel from Sydney Morning Herald gave the album 3 out of 5 saying; Despite the inclusion of a band "...most of the tracks here fail to have a band feeling about them. It is as if they are afraid to compete in any way with Noonan's undeniably ethereal voice – which displays both vulnerability and power as it hovers and soars – their gentle electronic sounds merely politely jostle around behind it." He added, "With the feel of a soundtrack with its intricate yet random textures this is not the best recording to show off Noonan's real talent."

Mac McNaughton of The Music Au gave the album 1 1/2 out of 5 saying; "Transmutant is so minimalist in sonic structure, you'd be buggered to know where [the band] actually are. If this album were a drink, it would be offensively overpriced with no discernable flavour whatsover. It's like Kate Miller-Heidke without the quirk, charm or lyrical playfulness, taking itself so painfully seriously. "

== Track listing ==
1. "Falling Into A Lie"
2. "Silence Speaks To The Lucky One"
3. "Quicksand"
4. "Gratitude"
5. "An Unwinnable Race"
6. "Running"
7. "Goodbyes"
8. "Broken"
9. "Island"
10. "In The Name Of The Father" (feat Jordan White)
11. "Peace is My Drug"
12. "Cloud Of Home"

== Weekly charts ==
Chart (2015)	Peak position
Australian Albums (ARIA)	33
Australian Artist Albums Chart	10

== Release history ==
Region	Date	Format	Label	Catalogue
Australia	24 July 2015	CD; digital download	Kin Music Australia / Universal Music Australia	4747192
