= Page One =

Page One may refer to:

- One-card, a card game with a variant known as Page One
- Page One (bookstore), a bookstore chain and publisher founded in Singapore
- Page One (Joe Henderson album), a 1963 album by Joe Henderson
- Page One (Steven Page album), a 2010 album by Steven Page
- Page One Records, a 1960s UK record label
- Page One: Inside the New York Times, a 2011 documentary film about The New York Times
- "Page One" (song) by Katie Noonan, 2010
- "Page One" (Press Gang), a 1989 television episode
