= Tim Dudfield =

Australian dance music producer and DJ

Mr. Timothy (a.k.a. 'T-Funk', real name Tim John Dudfield) is an Australian dance music producer and DJ. Over the years, he has worked on projects by a wide variety of artists including Madonna, INXS, Felix da Housecat, E Smoove, Inaya Day, Slinkee Minx, Brandy, Cher, Craig David, and Steve Silk Hurley.

== Career ==
In 2002, he released his debut single "Keep Rockin", which failed to chart. In 2004, he recorded "I Am tha 1" with American singer Inaya Day. The song reached peaked at number 28 on the ARIA charts on 12 July 2004. At the ARIA Music Awards of 2004, the song was nominated for Best Dance Release.

On 18 October 2004, MrTimothy released "Stand By Me" also featuring Inaya Day. The song peaked at number 59 on the ARIA charts. charted. In November 2004, MrTimothy released his debut studio album This Is Tha 1. Two further singles were released from the album; "4 Ever" and "I'm On My Way".

In 2005, MrTimothy changed his name to T-Funk and released a cover of "The Glamorous Life", again with Inaya Day. The song peaked at number 31 on the ARIA charts. In 2006, he released "Be Together" with Katie Underwood which also peaked at number 31 on the ARIA charts. In 2007, T-Funk returned to MrTimothy and released "I Don't Think That You Know" with Nat Dunn.

In April 2008, mrTimothy released a remix album of Katie Noonan's studio album Skin, titled Second Skin. The album debuted and peaked at number 19 on ARIA Dance Chart on 28 April 2008.

== Discography ==
=== Albums ===
Title	Album details
This Is Tha 1	Released: 22 November 2004; Label: Vicious Grooves (VGLP003CD); Format: CD
[[Second Skin (John Course and mrTimothy album)|Second Skin]] (credited as John Course and mrTimothy presented Katie Noonan)	Released: 21 April 2008; Label: Warner Music Australia (5144275012); Format: CD

=== Singles ===
List of singles, with selected chart positions
Title	Year	Peak chart positions	Album
Title	Year	AUS	Album
Credited as Mr Timothy
"Keep Rockin"	2002	—	
"I Am tha 1" (featuring Inaya Day)	2004	28	This Is Tha 1
"Stand By Me" (featuring Inaya Day)	2004	59	This Is Tha 1
"4Ever" (featuring Rahsaan Patterson)	2004	—	This Is Tha 1
"I'm On My Way" (featuring Sharon Pass)	2005	89	This Is Tha 1
Credited as T-Funk
"The Glamorous Life" (featuring Inaya Day)	2005	31	non-album single
"Be Together" (featuring Katie Underwood)	2006	31	non-album single
Credited as Mr Timothy
"I Don't Think That You Know" (featuring Nat Dunn)	2007	—	non-album single
"—" denotes items which were not released in that country or failed to chart.

== Awards ==
=== ARIA Music Awards ===
The ARIA Music Awards is an annual awards ceremony that recognises excellence, innovation, and achievement across all genres of Australian music. They commenced in 1987. CMr Timothy was nominated for one award.

Year	Nominee / work	Award	Result
2004	"I Am Tha 1"	Best Dance Release	Nominated
