= Before Time Could Change Us =

Studio album by Paul Grabowsky and Katie Noonan
- Released: 15 August 2005
- Recorded: 2003–2004
- Genre: Jazz
- Length: 76:45
- Label: Paul Grabowsky, Katie Noonan

Katie Noonan chronology
Two of a Kind (2004)	Before Time Could Change Us (2005)	Skin (2007)

Before Time Could Change Us is the collaborative studio album by Australian jazz writer/singer and composer Paul Grabowsky and singer-songwriter Katie Noonan. The album was released in August 2005. and peaked at number 65 on the ARIA Charts for the week commencing 22 August 2005.

The songs on the album are set to love lyrics by the late poet, Dorothy Porter. Grabowsky said; "Dot’s words are magnificent: she always had the power to compress complex ideas into a few well chosen – and musical – lines, or even just single explosive words. The music runs the gamut from jazz and latin-informed structures to something more approaching art-song. Katie Noonan, who possesses rare and exquisite vocal talents, sings them beautifully, and the band, in which I am joined by Scott Tinkler, trumpet, Philip Rex, bass and Simon Barker on drums, play up a storm."

At the ARIA Music Awards of 2005, it won the ARIA Award for Best Jazz Album.

The two toured the album nationally.

== Background ==
Noonan meet Paul Grabowsky dressed in a garbage bag at the Woodford Folk Festival sometime in the early noughties. Paul came and heard Elixir sing and soon after asked Noonan to join the Australian Art Orchestra on a European tour.

Shortly after this, Lyndon Terracini commissioned Paul to write a song cycle for the Queensland Music Festival with the late poet Dorothy Porter. Written for Noonan and a quartet featuring some of Australia's most fearless jazz musicians (namely Scott Tinkler – trumpet, Philip Rex – double bass and Simon Barker – drums/cymbals), the two recorded the album. Noonan said; "This album was one of the hardest albums I have ever made! Not only musically challenging but I was babe in the woods with this intense band!! I remember doing one of our first live takes and going outside and have a good cry in the gutter, nevertheless, I came out the other side relatively unscathed and am extremely proud of this album and we had a great time touring Australia with this music".

Comprising sixteen songs, the cycle explores the trajectory of a single relationship. "Before Time Could Change Us" is the final song in the cycle, and expresses what Porter referred to as the 'We'll always have Paris' effect – the mature realisation that the breakup had made both parties stronger.

== Reviews ==
Bridland said; "Paul Grabowsky, Katie Noonan and Dorothy Porter are three of Australia's finest artists - each unique, extremely talented and famous in their own particular field of endeavour. On this exciting new CD, the jazz musician, the singer and the poet have spun a magic piece of music. Before Time Could Change Us is a work of extraordinary breadth and delicacy. Not simply a work of jazz, it borrows from all manner of genre and art to create something unique, a fluid work of breathtaking beauty and emotion. You've never heard Katie Noonan sing like this before. In fact, you will never have heard anything quite like Before Time Could Change Us, full stop."

== Track listing ==
- All songs written by Paul Grabowsky and Dorothy Porter and feature Grabowsky and Katie Noonan on vocals.

Disc 2

1. "Not My Type" - 5:02
2. "Incapable of Caution" - 3:21
3. "Amazing Possibility" - 4:57
4. "You're Here" - 6:04
5. "Taking You On" - 7:00
6. "Tip to Toe" - 6:14
7. "Hot & Cold" - 4:35
8. "Nothing to Say" - 4:19
9. "Lucky Escape" - 4:04

Disc 2

1. "So Hard" - 6:34
2. "The Most Beautiful Thing" - 7:11
3. "Haunted" - 4:37
4. "If Snakes Could Fly" - 4:40
5. "Back in My World" - 5:18
6. "Just a Con" - 7:20
7. "Before Time Could Change Us" - 5:29

== Weekly charts ==
Chart (2005)	Peak position
Australian Albums Chart	65
Australian Jazz and Blues Albums Chart	3

== Release history ==
Region	Date	Format	Label	Catalogue
Australia	15 August 2005	CD; digital download	Paul Grabowsky & Katie Noonan	
