= Second Skin (John Course and mrTimothy album) =

Remix album by John Course & mrTimothy present Katie Noonan
- Released: 21 April 2008
- Genre: House, electronic
- Label: Warner Music Australia
- Producer: John Course, mrTimothy

Katie Noonan chronology
Skin (2007)	Second Skin (2008)	Blackbird: The Music of Lennon and McCartney (2008)

Second Skin is a remix album by Australian musicians John Course & mrTimothy, best known for their Ministry Of Sound compilations. The album, featuring Katie Noonan's vocals, is a remix project from her 2007 album Skin.

Noonan says: "The dance album project Second Skin was another fun element to this album – the chance to explore these tunes well and truly out of their comfort zone in the dance world – and for me to re-record all the lead vocals (in a day!)"

The album debuted and peaked at number 19 on ARIA Dance Chart on 28 April 2008.

== Reviews ==
Pete Dillon of SameSame said; "With programming/mixing from Mr Timothy and John Course, Noonan’s beautifully feminine voice sits fabulously over some acoustic and electric guitar sounds and some wicked dance beats. With a sound similar to Morcheeba and Moloko, this is the music you want on when you are zipping around the house with a dust cloth or mop. It has been spinning while I have entertained dinner guests and works just as nicely." Adding "This is a highly recommended disc and one that should be in all those collections that have some great vocally based funky electro sounds."

Waterfront said: "John Course and MrTimothy have captured the sensual and uplifting essence of Skin while introducing a house, funk beat - and the result is the refreshingly ambient remixed album."

== Track listing ==
1. "Who Are You?" (Electro Funk Lovers Mix) - 5:36
2. "Logic" (Electro Funk Lovers Mix) - 5:20
3. "Time to Begin" (Electro Funk Lovers Mix) - 5:19
4. "One Step" (Electro Funk Lovers Mix) - 4:11
5. "Love's My Song for You" (Electro Funk Lovers Mix) - 4:20
6. "Return" (Electro Funk Lovers Mix) - 3:58
7. "A Little Smile" (Electro Funk Lovers Mix) - 4:23
8. "Bluebird" (Electro Funk Lovers Mix) - 6:05
9. "Little Boy Man" (Electro Funk Lovers Mix) - 3:04
10. "Sunshine" (Electro Funk Lovers Mix) - 4:44
11. "Home" (Electro Funk Lovers Mix) - 4:57
12. "Send Out a Little Man" (Electro Funk Lovers Mix) - 3:50

== Charts ==
Chart performance for Second Skin
Chart (2008)	Peak position
Australia (ARIA Charts)	156

== Release history ==
Region	Date	Format	Label	Catalogue
Australia	21 April 2008	CD; digital download	Warner Music Australia	5144275012
