= Emperor's Box =

Studio album by Katie Noonan and the Captains
- Released: 9 April 2010
- Recorded: The Grove, Sydney
- Genre: Pop, jazz, alternative rock
- Label: Sony Music Australia
- Producer: Katie Noonan, Nick Didia

Katie Noonan chronology
Blackbird: The Music of Lennon and McCartney (2008)	Emperor's Box (2010)	First Seed Ripening (2011)

Emperor's Box is a studio album credited to Australian musician, Katie Noonan and the Captains. It was released in April 2010 and peaked at number 21 on the Australian ARIA Charts.

Speaking about the album, Noonan said; "Blackbird was definitely a musical departure for me [but] This new album is more my true path. My main motivation has always been to create an original sound and an original concept, and this really sounds like me." She added, "It's the best thing I've ever done, music is about freedom for me, I've always followed my muse and been very lucky to be able go on and make different records. This is definitely the album I’m most proud of." This was Noonan's last album with Sony Music Australia. "Page One" was released as the lead single on 19 February 2010.

== Reviews ==
Bernard Zuel from Sydney Morning Herald gave the album 3 out of 5 saying, "Noonan returns in some ways to where we first encountered her in George, in so far as several songs begin from pop-rock roots and a forceful backbeat and then pile on strings or electronics or vaulting vocalising (and sometimes all three) as they take left turns." adding "That's a lot of ideas on one record, which is as admirable as Noonan's refusal to play safe."

Jenny Meagher from the Music Feeds said; "The pleasant thing about Katie’s compositions is that they are all interesting and substantially individualistic. You never feel like you’ve hit the repeat button from a previous track. She can play it soft like a coo, or loud like an opera singer depending on the intention of the track. I advise if you are a fan of her already, then this won’t disappoint, just be prepared for the mixed bag of music that will bellow out of your headphones."

== Track listing ==
1. "Radar" (Adam Reily, Andy Stochansky, Cameron Deyell, Declan Kelly, Stuart Hunter, Katie Noonan) - 4:41
2. "Half in Water" (Stuart Hunter, Thomas Shapcott, Katie Noonan) - 3:37
3. "Page One" (Cameron Deyell, Don Walker, Katie Noonan) - 4:48
4. "Emperor's Box" (Katie Noonan)- 4:22
5. "Sweet One" (featuring Sia) (Lester Mendez, Sia Furler, Katie Noonan) - 4:08
6. "Time" (Katie Noonan) - 4:55
7. "I Had a Drink Today" (Cameron Deyell, Don Walker, Katie Noonan)- 2:25
8. "After The Rain" (Blair Mackichan, Stuart Crichton, Katie Noonan) - 4:21
9. "Never Know Your Luck" (Tim Finn, Katie Noonan)- 3:50
10. "Golden" (Katie Noonan)- 4:38
11. "Space Between" (Andrew Guirguis, Katie Noonan) - 3:00
12. "Cotton Wool" (Josh Pyke, Katie Noonan)- 4:21
13. "Little Boys" (Cameron Deyell, Thomas Shapcott, Katie Noonan)- 3:54

== Weekly charts ==
Chart (2010)	Peak position
Australian Albums (ARIA)	21
Australian Artist Albums Chart	5

== Release history ==
Region	Date	Format	Label	Catalogue
Australia	9 April 2010	CD; digital download	Sony Music Australia	88697682642

== Credits ==
- Arranged By [Horns]/ [Strings] – Katie Noonan, Steve Newcomb
- Backing Vocals – Josh Pyke
- Bass – Stu Hunter
- Bass Guitar – Phil Stack
- Drums – Declan Kelly
- Guitar – Cameron Deyell
- Keyboards – Katie Noonan, Stu Hunter
- Noises – Stu Hunter
- Percussion – Declan Kelly
