= Songs That Made Me =

Studio album by Katie Noonan
- Released: 17 October 2014
- Genre: Pop
- Label: Kin Music Australia

Katie Noonan chronology
Fierce Hearts (2014)	Songs That Made Me (2014)	Transmutant (2015)

Songs That Made Me is a collaborative studio album by Australian singer songwriter Katie Noonan and various female artists.

The album features Katie and some of her favourite female artists interpreting the songs that influenced their lives with 100% of profits from the album go to Cancer Council's Pink Ribbon.

The album grew from a successful tour in 2013, into a full-length album followed by an extensive national tour throughout October and November 2014.

== Background and release ==
"The initial idea for Songs That Made Me came from the desire to share the stage with other women and, to make it an exclusively female thing, because it's very rare, it doesn't happen often," Noonan says.

Noonan lead the way for the album's eclectic song choices which include covering Radiohead, The Pretenders and Fleetwood Mac. The only guide Noonan gave the musicians was to choose a song that "made them". "It could be a song you saw at your first gig or sang at your first gig, or the track you practised your routines to in your bedroom," Noonan says. Noonan envisages more of these groups, tours and albums and has even drawn up a wishlist of about 80 more female artists she wants to include in the next one. Ultimately, for Noonan, it's about creating that support and fostering female relationships - as musicians and in the industry.

== Track listing ==
1. "Let It Die" (Feist) performed by Ainslie Wills – 3:49
2. "Hymn to Her" (The Pretenders) performed by Kylie Auldist, Deborah Conway, Angie Hart, Katie Noonan and Ainslie Wills – 4:15
3. "River" (Joni Mitchell) performed by Melody Pool – 3:50
4. "When You Were Mine" (Cyndi Lauper) performed by Angie Hart - 4:04
5. "Fruits Of My Labor" (Lucinda Williams) performed by Mia Dyson – 3:40
6. "Another Day in Paradise" (Phil Collins) performed by Sam Buckingham – 3:56
7. "Mr. Sandman" (The Chordettes) performed by Sahara Beck – 2:09
8. "Ooh Child" (Nina Simone) performed by Kylie Auldist – 3:32
9. "Last Goodbye" (Jeff Buckley) by Katie Noonan – 4:23
10. "Street Spirit" (Radiohead) performed by Maples – 3:55
11. "Court and Spark" (Joni Mitchell) performed by Deborah Conway – 2:35
12. "The Chain" (Fleetwood Mac) by Stonefield – 4:16
13. "Sign Your Name" (Terence Trent D'Arby) by Anna Coddington and Katie Noonan – 4:20
14. "Still Crazy After All These Years" (Paul Simon) by Jo Lawry – 2:55
15. "It's a Man's Man's Man's World" (James Brown) by Renée Geyer – 5:00

== Weekly charts ==
Chart (2015)	Peak position
Australian Compilation Chart	7

== Release history ==
Region	Date	Format	Label	Catalogue
Australia	17 October 2014	CD; digital download	Kin Music Australia	4706498
