= Two of a Kind (Katie and Maggie Noonan album) =

Studio album by Katie Noonan and Maggie Noonan
- Released: 5 April 2004
- Recorded: Ferry Road Studios, Brisbane (2003)
- Label: ABC Music

Katie Noonan chronology
Two of a Kind (2004)	Before Time Could Change Us (2005)

Two of a Kind is the debut studio album by Australian jazz singer Katie Noonan, alongside her mother Maggie Noonan as well as The Red Fish Blue jazz trio and The Queensland Orchestra conducted by Guy Noble. The album was released in April 2004 and peaked at number 61 on the ARIA Charts and number 2 on the ARIA Classical chart on 10 May 2004.

Katie explained:

After being asked to do the 10th annual Brisbane concert series ‘Woman in Voice’ with my mother, Martin Buzacott from The Queensland Symphony Orchestra suggested we make an album with the orchestra under the baton of conductor Guy Noble. We were joined by some of the finest jazz musicians, the wonderful orchestra and a great jazz horn section led by the beautiful trumpeter John Hoffman, and making this album was a pure joy. With the wonderful guidance of Lyle Chan and the recording prowess of Virginia Read we made this album live. Post release Mum and I had the great honour of touring Australia playing with our finest orchestras.

== Reviews ==
Heather Bloom of Australian Stage said "These two voices, both so incredible in their own right are stunning when joined in a duet. Both in perfect harmony as only a mother and daughter can, Katie’s clear voice and extensive range is astounding, while Maggie brings the operatic edge."

== Track listing ==
1. "Too Marvelous for Words" (Richard Whiting) – 2:53
2. "Summertime" (George Gershwin) – 5:55
3. "Un bel dì (One fine day)" (Giacomo Puccini) – 4:42
4. "Cio cio San Dreaming" (Sam Keevers) – 1:47
5. "Poor Butterfly" (Raymond Hubbell) – 4:53
6. "Ebben? Ne andrò lontana" (Alfredo Catalani) – 4:05
7. "Flower Duet" (Léo Delibes) – 5:21
8. "Lush Life" (Billy Strayhorn) – 8:22
9. "Letter Duet" (Wolfgang Amadeus Mozart) – 2:57
10. "Song to the Moon" (Antonín Dvořák) – 6:38
11. "Les Feuilles Mortes" (Joseph Kosma) – 5:17
12. "Pleurez! Pleurez mes yeuxi!" (Jules Massenet) – 6:28
13. "I Have a Love" (Leonard Bernstein) – 3:11

== Weekly charts ==
Chart (2004)	Peak position
Australian Albums Chart	61
Australian Classical Albums Chart	2

== Release history ==
Region	Date	Format	Label	Catalogue
Australia	5 April 2004	CD; digital download	ABC Music	ABC 4761618
