= Page One (song) =

- CD single cover

Single by Katie Noonan and the Captains

from the album Emperor's Box
- B-side: "Time"
- Released: 19 February 2010
- Length: 4:48
- Label: Sony Music Australia
- Songwriter(s): Don Walker, Cameron Deyell, Katie Noonan
- Producer(s): Katie Noonan, Nick Didia

"Page One" is a song by Australian singer songwriter Katie Noonan and the Captains. It was released on 19 February 2010 and is included on the album Emperor's Box.

"Page One" was a wedding present to Captain’s keyboardist Stu and his wife Ashlie. A music video was released to promote the song.

== Track listings ==
1. "Page One" (Don Walker, Cameron Deyell, Katie Noonan)
2. "Time" (Noonan)
3. "Radar" (Andy Stochansky, Declan Kelly, Stu Hunter, Cameron Deyell, Katie Noonan)
4. "Jóga" (Björk Gudmundsdottir, Sigurjon B. Sigurdsson)
5. "Page One" (Walker, Deyell, Noonan)
- Tracks 3 to 5 are recorded live at Electric Avenue.

== Charts ==
| Chart (2010) | Peak position |
|---|---|
| Australia Physical Singles Chart (ARIA) | 5 |
