= I Am tha 1 =

- Australian CD single cover art

Single by Mr Timothy featuring Inaya Day

from the album This Is tha 1
- Released: July 2004
- Length: 3:20
- Label: Vicious Grooves
- Songwriter(s): Brad Pinto; Gary Pinto; Inaya Davis; Tim Dudfield
- Producer(s): Mr Timothy

Mr Timothy singles chronology
"Keep Rockin" (2002)	"I Am tha 1" (2004)	"Stand By Me" (2004)

"I Am tha 1" is a song credited to Mr Timothy featuring Inaya Day. The song was released in July 2004 as the lead single from Mr Timothy's debut studio album This Is Tha 1. The song peaked at number 28 on the ARIA Charts.

At the ARIA Music Awards of 2004, the song was nominated for ARIA Award for Best Dance Release.

== Track listings ==
Australian CD single (Vicious Grooves – VG12025CD)
No.	Title	Length
1.	"I Am tha 1" (T-Funk Radio Edit)	3:28
2.	"I Am tha 1" (E-Funk 12")	7:51
3.	"Keep Rockin" (mrT & E Radio Edit)	3:24
4.	"I Am tha 1" (Original 12")	7:12
5.	"I Am tha 1" (T-Funk 12")	8:32

== Charts ==
Chart (2004)	Peak position
Australia (ARIA)	28
