= Karin Schaupp =

Australian classical guitarist

- Born: 1972 (age 53–54); Hofheim am Taunus, Germany
- Instrument: Classical guitar
- Years active: 1990–present
- Website: karinschaupp.com

Karin Schaupp (born 1972) is a German-born Australian classical guitarist. She has won APRA Music Awards and ARIA Music Awards.

== Early life ==
Karin Schaupp was born in Hofheim am Taunus, Germany, in 1972. Her mother, Isolde Schaupp, was a teacher of guitar at the conservatorium of Wiesbaden. Her father, a doctor, was an amateur pianist, and her aunt and grandmother were opera singers. Karin was given a half-size guitar by her grandmother when she was aged three. She started her guitar studies with her mother when she was five, and performed in public at age six. Her family, including both sets of grandparents, migrated from Germany to Australia when she was aged eight, and they have been based in Brisbane, Queensland, where Isolde Schaupp continues to teach at the University of Queensland and the University of Southern Queensland. Karen was dux of Clayfield College and she completed her tertiary education with bachelor's and master's degrees in music at the University of Queensland. Schaupp also trained at the National Institute of Dramatic Art (NIDA).

== Career ==
While in her teens, Karin Schaupp won prizes at competitions at Lagonegro in Italy and Madrid in Spain. At the Madrid competition she won the special competition prize for the Best Interpretation of Spanish Music. She performed Joaquín Rodrigo's Concierto de Aranjuez with the Queensland Philharmonic Orchestra when she was aged 18.

She is a member of Saffire, also known as the Australian Guitar Quartet, along with Slava Grigoryan, Gareth Koch, and Anthony Field (replaced by Leonard Grigoryan).

In 1995, Schaupp performed Philip Bračanin's Guitar Concerto, which she had premiered in 1992, with the Queensland Symphony Orchestra. The recording won an APRA Award at the APRA Awards of 1995.

Schaupp's solo debut album, Soliloquy, released in 1997, was praised by UK Classical Guitar Magazine as "a pace-setting performance in all respects".

In 2003 Schaupp was awarded the Music Council of Australia Freedman Fellowship in recognition of her achievements.

In 2004, Schaupp performed with Ross Edwards' Concerto for Guitar and Strings with the Tasmanian Symphony Orchestra.

In 2007, David Williamson wrote the one-woman play Lotte's Gift for her; it is based on her own life and that of her mother and grandmother (the Lotte of the title). The performance includes both acting and playing the guitar and is regularly toured by Schaupp. Schaupp says she was initially nervous about airing the family history. "I took quite a bit of convincing, but David made me realise if we were going to tell the story, we had to tell the whole story. There are many layers: a love story, a war story, a musical story." Williamson said that despite Lotte's thwarted ambition, her story was a happy one. "One of the terrific things is that Karin's grandmother's need to perform has finally come out." Schaupp starred in some 150 performances of Lotte's Gift, including a four-week season at the Edinburgh Festival Fringe in 2009.

Schaupp released Spain in 2009 which features works by Rodrigo, Salvador Bacarisse and Mario Castelnuovo-Tedesco. It was recorded with the Tasmanian Symphony Orchestra and the choir Cantillation.

In 2010, Schaupp recorded Cradle Songs, inspired by the birth of her daughter Alexa.

In 2013, Schaupp won the Music Fellowship from the Australia Council for the Arts.

In 2016, she and actor Tama Matheson co-created the theatre work titled Don Juan, based on Lord Byron's poem.

In March 2018, ABC Classics released Schaupp's album titled Wayfaring, with cellist Umberto Clerici.

Schaupp performed at the 2018 Commonwealth Games closing ceremony.

== Personal life ==
She was divorced in 2026 from her former husband, Giac Giacomantonio, a psychotherapist and former guitar student of her mother Isolde. They have a daughter and a son.

== Discography ==
Title	Details
Soliloquy	Released: 1997; Label: Warner (63018157); Format: CD
Leyenda	Released: 1998; Label: Warner (84233062); Format: CD
Evocation	Released: 2000; Label: Warner (85738331); Format: CD
Dreams	Released: 2004; Label: ABC Classics (4762269); Format: CD
Songs without Words (with Genevieve Lacey)	Released: 2006; Label: ABC Classics (ABC 4765249); Format: CD
Lotte's Gift	Released: 2007; Label: ABC Classics (4765917); Format: CD; Music from play Lotte's Gift by David Williamson
Spain: The Great Guitar Concertos	Released: January 2009; Label: ABC Music; Format: CD, Digital download
Cradle Songs	Released: 2010; Label: ABC Music (2736981); Format: CD, Digital download
Fandango (with Flinders Quartet)	Released: 13 March 2011; Label: Karin Schaupp and the Flinders Quartet; Format: Digital download
Songs from the British Isles (with Katie Noonan)	Released: 2011; Label: Katie Noonan and Karin Schaupp; Format: CD, Digital download
Songs of the Southern Skies (with Katie Noonan)	Released: 17 August 2012; Label: Katie Noonan and Karin Schaupp (3713279); Format: CD, Digital download
Mosaic: Australian Guitar Concertos	Released: 16 May 2014; Label: ABC Music; Format: CD, Digital download
Songs of the Latin Skies (with Katie Noonan)	Released: 17 February 2017; Label: Kin Music (5743174); Format: CD, Digital download
Wayfaring (with Umberto Clerici)	Released: 2 March 2018; Label: ABC Music; Format: CD, Digital download
Songs of the Southern Skies Vol 2 (with Katie Noonan)	Released: 18 October 2024; Label: Katie Noonan and Karin Schaupp; Formats: CD, digital download

== Awards ==
=== AIR Awards ===
The Australian Independent Record Awards (commonly known informally as AIR Awards) is an annual awards night to recognise, promote and celebrate the success of Australia's Independent Music sector.

Year	Nominee / work	Award	Result	Ref.
2025	Songs of the Southern Skies Vol 2 (with Katie Noonan)	Best Independent Classical Album or EP	Nominated	

=== APRA Awards ===
The APRA Awards are held in Australia and New Zealand by the Australasian Performing Right Association to recognise songwriting skills, sales and airplay performance by its members annually. Schaupp has won two awards.

Year	Nominee / work	Award	Result
1995	"Concerto for Guitar and Chamber Orchestra" (Philip Bracanin with Karin Schaupp)	Most Performed Contemporary Classical Compesition	Won
2005	"Concerto for Guitar and Strings" (Tasmanian Symphony Orchestra and Karin Schaupp)	Orchestral Work of the Year	Won

=== ARIA Music Awards ===
The ARIA Music Awards is an annual awards ceremony that recognises excellence, innovation, and achievement across all genres of Australian music. Schaupp has won 1 award from 5 nominations.

Year	Nominee / work	Award	Result
1998	Leyenda	Best Classical Album	Nominated
2011	Fandango (with the Flinders Quartet)	Best Classical Album	Nominated
2012	Songs of the Southern Skies (with Katie Noonan)	Best Adult Contemporary Album	Nominated
2012	Songs of the Southern Skies (with Katie Noonan)	Best Independent Release	Nominated
2017	Songs of the Latin Skies (with Katie Noonan)	Best World Music Album	Won

=== Australian Women in Music Awards ===
The Australian Women in Music Awards is an annual event that celebrates outstanding women in the Australian Music Industry who have made significant and lasting contributions in their chosen field. They commenced in 2018.

Year	Nominee / work	Award	Result	Ref.
2024	Karin Schaupp	Excellence in Classical Music Award	Nominated	

=== Queensland Music Awards ===
The Queensland Music Awards (previously known as Q Song Awards) are annual awards celebrating Queensland, Australia's brightest emerging artists and established legends. They commenced in 2006.

Year	Nominee / work	Award	Result (wins only)	Ref.
2024	"Cybernylon"	Contemporary Classical and Music for Stage Award	Won	
