= Lotte's Gift =

- Original language: English
- Written by: David Williamson
- Characters: Karin Schaupp
- Genre: musical

Premiere
- Date: February 2007
- Place: Ensemble Theatre, Sydney

Lotte's Gift is a play by David Williamson. It was written as a deliberate attempt by Williamson to try something in a different style and was written as a vehicle for guitarist Karin Schaupp.

== Background ==
Karin Schaupp approached Williamson in 2002 to write the project. She wanted to act in a production that combined drama with her musical skills. Williamson was enthusiastic and started asking Schaupp about her family history. When the guitarist told her about her grandmother Lotte, Williamson decided to structure the story around three generations of women in her family.

The play premiered at the 2006 Noosa Festival as Strings Under Her Fingers. It was subsequently reworked as Lotte's Gift.
