= Sam Buckingham =

Australian roots and Americana musician

- Born: Sydney, Australia
- Origin: Byron Bay, Australia
- Genres: blues and roots; Americana music
- Occupations: Musician; singer-songwriter
- Instrument: Vocals
- Website: www.sambuckingham.com

Sam Buckingham is an Australian singer-songwriter from Byron Bay, Australia.

Buckingham has toured alongside iOTA, Abby Dobson, Lior, Kasey Chambers, Felix Riebl, Angus & Julia Stone, Washington and Katie Noonan and has been long-listed for the Australian Music Prize and is a seven-time finalist in the International Songwriting Competition.

Buckingham's fourth studio album Beautiful Machine (March 2026) debuted at number 35 on the ARIA Charts.

== Early life ==
In a 2022 interview with Music Festivals Australia, Buckingham said, "I've been singing for as long as I can remember… There are recordings of me at five years old, making albums with my Granddad, who was a singer and actor... My uncle gave me a hand-me-down guitar for Christmas when I was 14 and it suddenly just made sense for me to put music to the words I’ve been writing. It’s always felt natural to me, even when I began performing and was terrified to be in front of an audience."

== Career ==
Between 2005 and 2009, Buckingham released three extended plays, Daydreamer (2005), My Own Horse (2008) and Gravity (2009) and was a finalist in the International Songwriting Competition. the EP Fragile Heart was released in 2012.

In July 2013, Buckingham released I'm a Bird. This was followed in 2017 with The Water; a collection of songs that confront fear, convey heartache and celebrate adventure, desire and devotion.

Buckingham released Dear John in April 2022

Buckingham released her fourth studio album Beautiful Machine in March 2026. It debuted at number 35 on the ARIA Charts.

== Discography ==
=== Studio albums ===
List of albums, with selected details and chart positions
Title	Album details	Peak chart positions
Title	Album details	AUS
I'm a Bird	Released: July 2013; Format: CD, digital; Label: Sam Buckingham (BUCK03)	—
The Water	Released: June 2017; Format: CD, digital; Label: Sam Buckingham (BUCK04)	—
Dear John	Released: 8 April 2022; Format: CD, digital; Label: Sam Buckingham (BUCK05)	—
Beautiful Machine	Released: 6 March 2026; Format: CD, LP, digital; Label: Sam Buckingham (BUCK06)	35

=== Extended plays ===
List of EPs, with selected details
Title	Details
Daydreamer	Released: 2006; Format: CD; Label:
My Own Horse	Released: 2008; Format: CD; Label: Yellow Brick Records (YB003)
Gravity	Released: 2009; Format: CD, digital; Label: Sam Buckingham (BUCK01)
Fragile Heart	Released: October 2012; Format: CD, digital; Label: Sam Buckingham (BUCK02)
Stories from the Road (with Timothy James Bowen)	Released: May 2018; Format: digital; Label: Sam Buckingham & Timothy James Bowen
Woman (with Sarah Humphries)	Released: November 2020; Format: digital; Label: Sam Buckingham & Sarah Humphries
