= Elixir (Elixir album) =

Studio album by Elixir
- Released: 19 May 2003
- Recorded: Rockinghorse Studios, Byron Bay, Australia
- Label: Kin Music Australia / Festival Mushroom Records
- Producer: Jonathan Shakhovsky, Katie Noonan

Elixir chronology
Elixir (2003)	First Seed Ripening (2011)

Elixir is the debut studio album by Australian jazz band Elixir, released in May 2003 and peaked at number 24 on the ARIA Charts. The band was formed in Brisbane in 1997 by Katie Noonan and Nick Stewart from ARIA award winning, double-platinum selling band george and River Petein.

== Track listing ==
1. "Tip of Memory" (Katie Noonan, Nick Stewart, Martin Challis) – 5:16
2. "River Man" (Nick Drake) – 5:00
3. "Before You Sleep" (Katie Noonan, Nick Stewart, Martin Challis) – 3:33
4. "Raspberry Tea" (Katie Noonan, Martin Challis) – 3:54
5. "Breath of Grace" (Katie Noonan, Nick Stewart, Martin Challis) – 5:51
6. "Blue" (Vince Jones) – 4:07
7. "Essence of My Love" (Katie Noonan, Martin Challis) – 3:57
8. "Saigon Battle Children 1972" (Katie Noonan, Nick Stewart, Martin Challis) – 7:44
9. "Goodbye Yellow Brick Road" (Elton John) – 4:27
10. "Harvest of Rain" (Katie Noonan, Nick Stewart, Martin Challis) – 2:25
11. "String Interlude" (Paul Grabowsky) – 1:02
12. "Mists of Ruse" (Katie Noonan, Martin Challis) – 2:50
13. "Overlap" (Ani DiFranco) – 3:33
14. "Second Sight" (Jamie Clark, Leah Cotterell, Meg Kanowsli) – 3:44
15. "Drunk on Her Taste" (Katie Noonan) – 4:11
16. "River and Moon" (Katie Noonan, Martin Challis) – 4:03
17. "River of She" (Isaac Hurren, Martin Challis) – 2:13

=== Weekly charts ===
Chart (2003)	Peak position
Australian Albums (ARIA)	24
Australian Artist Albums Chart	2

== Credits ==
- Artwork – Benjamin Portas
- Cello [string quartet] – Dan Curro
- Co-producer – Isaac Hurren, Nick Stewart
- Composed by [horns], arranged by [horns] – Isaac Hurren
- Composed by [strings], arranged by [strings] – Paul Grabowsky
- Euphonium [horn trio] – Thomas Humphrey
- Flugelhorn [horn trio] – Dale Richardson, John Hoffman
- Mastered by – Oscar Gaona
- Photography by [band and road] – Nina
- Recorded by [strings and horns] – Jonathan Shakhovsky, Justin Tresidder
- Viola [string quartet] – Brett Dean
- Violin [string quartet] – John Rodgers, Sarah Curro

== Release history ==
Region	Date	Format	Label	Catalogue
Australia	19 May 2013	CD; digital download	Kin Music Australia / Festival Mushroom Records	336362
