= Inaya Day =

American singer

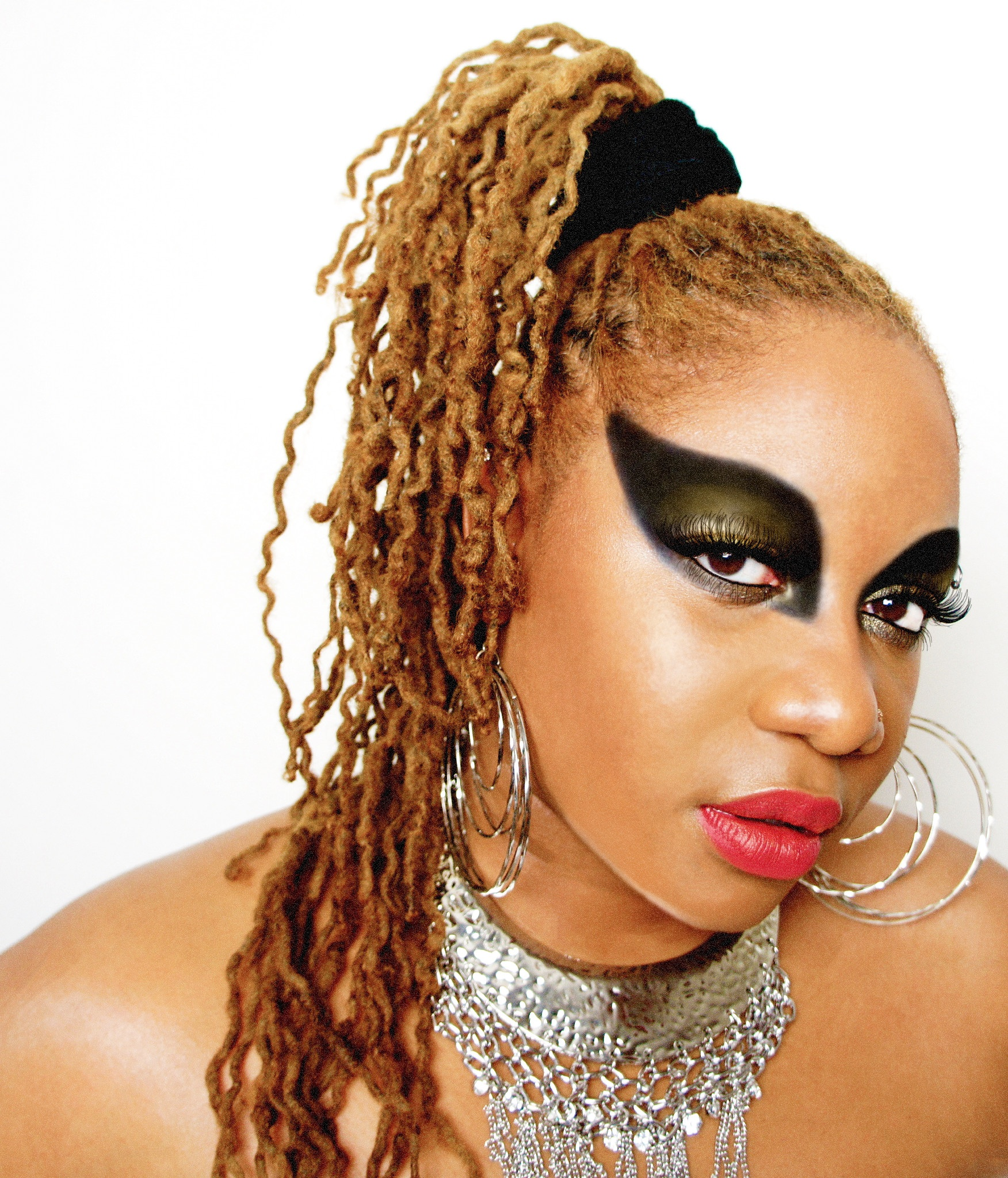
- Inaya Day in 2012

Background information
- Born: Inaya Davis; January 17, 1977 (age 49); Brooklyn, New York, U.S.
- Genres: House; dance
- Occupation: Singer-songwriter

Inaya Day (born Inaya Davis, January 17, 1977) is an American singer, best known for her vocal work on house music tracks such as "Horny '98" by Mousse T, and her cover version of "Nasty Girl" by Prince protégées Vanity 6.

== Biography ==
=== Early career ===
Day started singing in church in Brooklyn, New York. She attended the prestigious High School of Music and the Performing Arts, and went on to study musical theater at the University of Bridgeport. She also appeared on Broadway, notably as understudy to Stephanie Mills as "Dorothy" in The Wiz, and stepped into the lead role in Washington, D.C., and St. Louis, Missouri.

She has had extensive experience as a session musician, having appeared on tracks by Michael Jackson, Al Green, Puff Daddy, MC Lyte, Queen Latifah, Monie Love, Big Daddy Kane and Jonathan Butler. Day has also written songs for Randy Crawford and Bootsy Collins, and has writing credits on Missy Elliott's "Gossip Folks" (the second single from her Under Construction album), on which Day co-wrote the hook and provided backing vocals.

=== House music ===
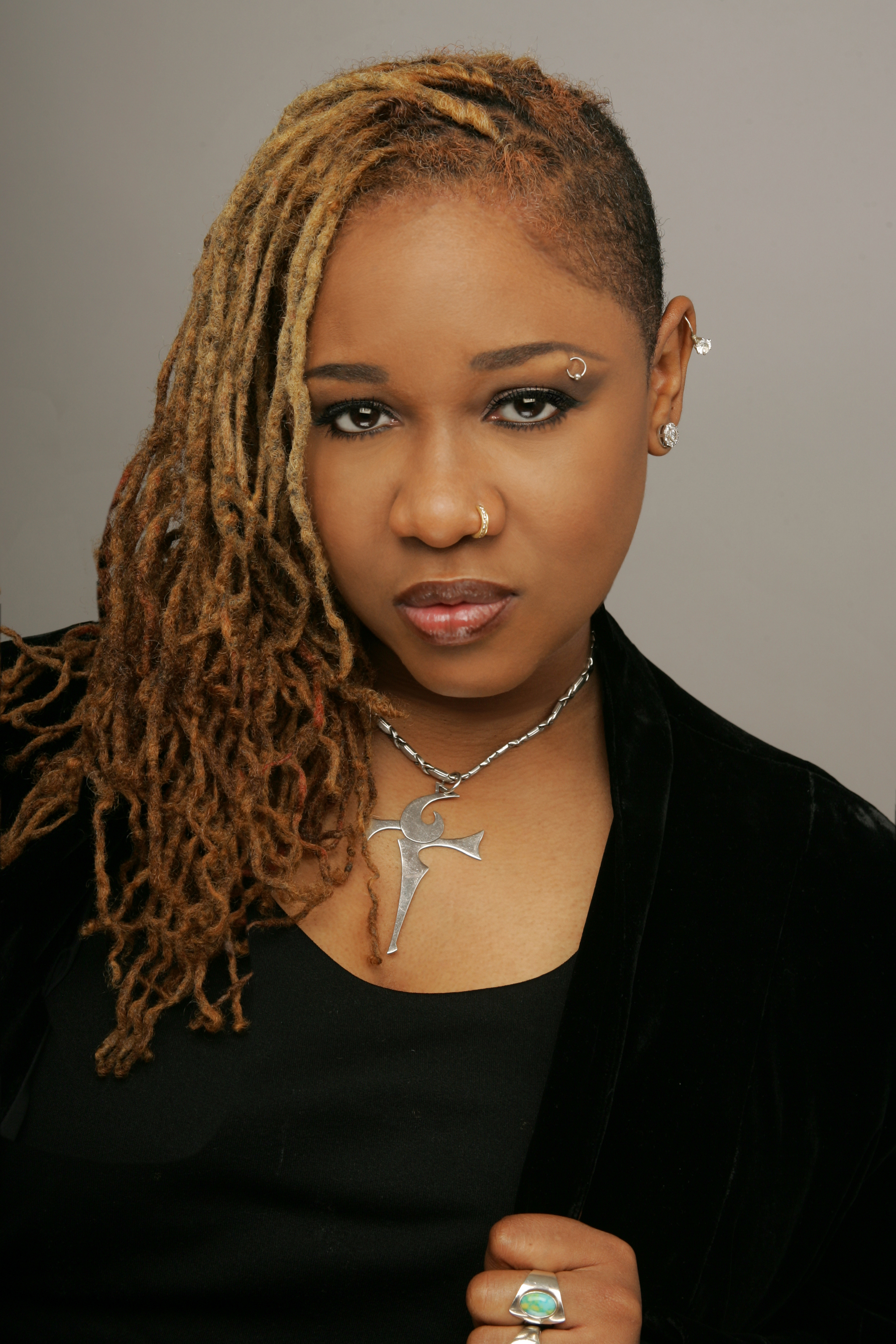

Day was introduced to house music in 1996 when she was asked to do a demo. She met German record producers Boris Dlugosch and Mousse T, who produced a dance single "Keep Pushin", which went on to reach No. 2 on the Billboard dance charts. She then sang chorus for Mousse T's track "Horny", which later gained in popularity when additional vocals from the duo Hot 'N' Juicy were added to the song. "Horny" reached No. 1 on the Billboard dance chart. The follow-up song "Hold Your Head Up High", with Booom!, reached No. 6 on the Billboard dance chart.

In 1997, she released the club anthem "Movin' Up", credited as DJ Mike Cruz Presents Inaya Day and Chyna Ro. For this record, long time friend and actress Tichina Arnold lent her vocals but chose to use the moniker Chyna Ro for the project. She again teamed up with Cruz for "Can't Stop Dancing" which reached No. 1 on the Billboard club play chart.

In 2004 she sang on a track by the Australian dance producer mrTimothy called "I Am Tha 1", credited to Mr Timothy featuring Inaya Day, which went to the top of the Australian dance charts and top 30 in the Australian pop charts. She also sang on his next single "Stand By Me" later that year. "Nasty Girl" was first released in Australia, reaching the top 20, and it was then released in the UK in July 2005, and reached No. 9 there. Later that year, she also guest featured on "The Glamorous Life", a single by T-Funk, an alternate alias of mrTimothy. In June 2007, Day released a cover version of the 1988 Big Pig song, "Breakaway", which itself was a cover of the song "I Can't Break Away" by Chuck Jackson.

== Discography ==
- 1996 – "Can't Stop Dancin'" – Cruz and Bugz – No. 1 Billboard dance chart
- 1997 – "Movin' Up (Take My Problems to the Dance Floor)" – Mike Cruz featuring Inaya Day and Tichina Arnold China Ro – No. 2 Billboard dance chart
- 2000 – "Feel It" – with DJ Dome – UK No. 51
- "I'm Touched" – DJ Dove featuring Inaya Day
- "Shout It Out" – Inaya Day meets Louis Benedetti
- 1999 – "Just Can't Get Enough" – Harry "Choo Choo" Romero Presents Inaya Day – No. 39 UK
- "I Will" – Mongobonix featuring Inaya Day
- "Hold Your Head Up High" – Boris Dlugosch Presents Booom!
- "Keep Pushin' On" – Boris Dlugosch remix
- 2004 – "Better Things" – Afropeans
- 2004 – "I Am tha 1" – Mr Timothy featuring Inaya Day
- 2005 – "Nasty Girl" – produced by Mousse T. and So Phat! (cover of the Vanity 6 song)
- 2005 – "The Glamorous Life" – by T-Funk featuring Inaya Day
- 2006 – "Stand By Me" – Mr Timothy featuring Inaya Day
- 2007 – "Breakaway"
- 2008 – "Say You Will"
- 2008 – "Natural High" – Michael Woods Feat. Inaya Day
- 2009 – "Take Me Up" – Inaya Day vs. Leggz & Femi B
- 2009 – "Got 2 Get Up" – Mr Timothy featuring Inaya Day
- 2009 – "Let There Be" – Inaya Day and Antoine Dessante
- 2010 – "Superstar" – Inaya Day and DJ Eako
- 2010 – "Never Had Another Love" – Mike Cruz presents Inaya Day
- 2010 – "Better Days" – Inaya Day and Native Sons
- 2010 – "All I'm Sayin' (Just Hold On)'" – Inaya Day and Nick J
- 2010 – "Joy" – Inaya Day and Antoine Dessante
- 2010 – "Til The Morning Comes" – Inaya Day vs Diego Ray & Nick Corline
- 2010 – "Do The Right Thing" – Quentin Harris and Inaya Day
- 2011 – "Chase me" – Inaya Day
- 2011 – "Rapid Fire (Rapido)" – Inaya Day & Giangi
- 2011 – "Where Are They Now" – Inaya Day & Dmitry Filatov
- 2011 – "Sweet Lover" – Inaya Day vs Menini & Viani
- 2011 – "Next To You" – Inaya Day
- 2011 – "Time Is Now" – Inaya Day and Mangesto
- 2011 – "Lose My Worries" – Inaya Day & Ralf Gum
- 2011 – "My Love" – Inaya Day vs Sem Thomasson & Siege
- 2011 – "One Way" – Inaya Day
- 2012 – "That Place" – Dunk N' Aliens feat Mia & Inaya Day
- 2012 – "Redemption" – DeVonde & Mangesto feat Inaya Day
- 2012 – "Jump Up & Down" – Mike Cruz produces Inaya Day & Mark Shine
- 2012 – "Long Day" – Inaya Day Allstars featuring Crystal Waters
- 2013 – "Like You" – Ridney & Inaya Day
- 2013 – "Make Some Noise" – Inaya Day & DJ Escape
- 2014 – "Shelter Me" – Lee Dagger, featuring Inaya Day
- 2015 – "Stranded" – Dirty Disco, featuring Inaya Day
- 2016 – "Do What We Do" – Bit Error & Country Club Martini Crew feat. Inaya Day
- 2016 – "Keep Pushin'" – Tujamo, featuring Inaya Day
- 2016 – "One Night In Heaven" – Toy Armada and DJ Grind feat. Inaya Day
- 2020 – "Love Like This" – (Greg Gould feat. Inaya Day) on the album 1998
- 2025 - ''Our Revival'' - Ewan McVicar & Inaya Day

== See also ==
- List of number-one dance hits (United States)
- List of artists who reached number one on the US Dance chart
