= Flinders Quartet =

Australian string quartet

- Origin: Melbourne, Australia
- Years active: 2000 -
- Members: Helen Ireland; Zoe Knighton; Thibaud Pavlovic-Hobba; Wilma Smith
- Past members: Matthew Tomkins; Erica Kennedy; Shane Chen; Helen Ayres; Nicolas Waters

Flinders Quartet is an Australian string quartet. They were formed in 2000 by Helen Ireland, Zoe Knighton, Matthew Tomkins and Erica Kennedy. In 2012 Helen Ayres and Shane Chen replaced Tomkins and Kennedy. Ayres was in turn replaced by Nicholas Waters in 2015.

Karin Schaupp & Flinders Quartet's album Fandango received a nomination for the 2011 ARIA Award for Best Classical Album.

== Current members ==
- Elizabeth Sellars - violin
- Wilma Smith - violin
- Helen Ireland - viola
- Zoe Knighton - cello

== Past members ==
- Thibaud Pavlovic-Hobba - violin
- Nicholas Waters - violin
- Shane Chen - violin
- Helen Ayres - violin
- Erica Kennedy - violin
- Matthew Tomkins - violin

== Discography ==
=== Albums ===
List of albums, with selected details
Title	Details
Live	Released: 2004; Format: CD; Label: Flinders Quartet
Fandango (with Karin Schaupp)	Released: 2011; Format: CD; Label: ABC Classics
Reinventions (with Genevieve Lacey)	Released: March 2015; Format: CD; Label: ABC Classics
Intimate Voices: Sibelius String Quartets	Released: September 2015; Format: CD; Label: ABC Classics

== Awards and nominations ==
=== ARIA Music Awards ===
The ARIA Music Awards is an annual awards ceremony that recognises excellence, innovation, and achievement across all genres of Australian music. They commenced in 1987.

Year	Nominee / work	Award	Result	Ref.
2011	Fandango (with Karin Schaupp )	Best Classical Album	Nominated	
