= Blackbird: The Music of Lennon and McCartney =

Studio album by Katie Noonan
- Released: 27 October 2008
- Recorded: Legacy Studios, New York City
- Genre: Jazz
- Label: Sony Music Australia
- Producer: Joe Lovano and Katie Noonan

Katie Noonan chronology
Second Skin (2008)	Blackbird: The Music of Lennon and McCartney (2008)	Emperor's Box (2010)

Blackbird: The Music of Lennon and McCartney is a studio album by Australian singer songwriter Katie Noonan. The album was released in October 2008 and peaked at number 43 on the ARIA album chart. Blackbird is a set of cover versions of John Lennon and Paul McCartney tracks. The album includes performances from Ron Carter, Lewis Nash, Joe Lovano, John Scofield and Sam Keevers. At the ARIA Music Awards of 2009 the album won Best Jazz Album.

== Background ==
In early 2005 Noonan heard Joe Lovano playing saxophone at Sydney's Angel Place. A couple of years later Noonan was dreaming up a project where she could combine her two main loves – pop music and the freedom of jazz improvisation. It was then that the seeds of the album were sewn. Noonan spoke to Lovano and flew to New York City to make a record with local jazz musicians.

== Track listing ==
1. "In My Life" - 4:25
2. "Yesterday" - 5:14
3. "For No One" - 3:07
4. "Blackbird" - 3:04
5. "If I Fell" - 4:15
6. "Here, There and Everywhere" - 2:38
7. "Norwegian Wood" - 3:31
8. "Across the Universe" - 6:08
9. "Eleanor Rigby" - 5:05
10. "Michelle" - 3:58
11. "Because" - 2:40
12. "The Long and Winding Road" - 3:56
13. "And I Love Her" - 4:06
14. "Fool on the Hill" - 7:47
15. "I Will" - 2:11

== Charts ==
=== Weekly charts ===
Chart (2008)	Peak position
Australian Albums (ARIA)	43
Australian Jazz and Blues Chart	1

=== Year-end charts ===
Chart (2008)	Rank
Australian Jazz Albums Chart	7
Chart (2009)	Rank
Australian Jazz Albums Chart	11
Chart (2009)	Rank
Australian Jazz Albums Chart	32

== Release history ==
Region	Date	Format	Label	Catalogue
Australia	27 October 2008	CD; digital download	Sony Music Australia	88697394382
