= The Sweetest Taboo (album) =

Studio album by Katie Noonan
- Released: 8 May 2020
- Genres: Jazz, pop
- Length: 61:57
- Label: ABC Music

Katie Noonan chronology
Late Night Tunes with Noons (2020)	The Sweetest Taboo (2020)

The Sweetest Taboo is a twentieth album by Australian singer and songwriter Katie Noonan. The album is described as a jazz collection of reimagined 80s classics and was released in May 2020. The album peaked at number 70 on the ARIA Charts.

Noonan said "For my twentieth album, I wanted to go back to the magic, the joy, the spark that first started my love affair with pop music. This was in suburban Brisbane, Ashgrove, in the mid-eighties. I decided to focus on a particular period of time, aged seven to eleven, from my first single to my first album, to albums that really changed our lives like The Joshua Tree. I picked bunch of tunes and reimagined them with my favourite Aussie jazz musicians, so, it's feels awesome."

At the AIR Awards of 2021, the album won Best Independent Jazz Album or EP.

== Track listing ==
1. "Don't Dream It's Over (Neil Finn) - 4:59
2. "Blue" (Vince Jones) - 4:22
3. "If I Could" (Garry Frost) - 6:03
4. "Just the Way You Are" (Billy Joel) - 4:45
5. "True Colors" (Tom Kelly, Billy Steinberg) - 5:23
6. "Electric Blue" (Iva Davies, John Oates) - 4:33
7. "I Wanna Dance with Somebody (Who Loves Me)" (George Merrill, Shannon Rubicam) - 5:18
8. "When Tomorrow Comes" (Annie Lennox, Patrick Seymour, David A. Stewart) - 5:24
9. "Russians" (Sergey Prokofiev, Sting) - 4:41
10. "Sign Your Name" (Terence Trent D'Arby) - 6:08
11. "Take On Me" (Magne Furuholmen, Morten Harket, Pål Waaktaar) - 3:54
12. "Running to Stand Still" (Bono, Adam Clayton, The Edge, Larry Mullen Jr.) - 6:27

== Charts ==
=== Weekly charts ===
Chart (2020)	Peak position
Australia (ARIA Chart)	70
Australia (ARIA) Jazz and Blues Chart	1

=== Year-end charts ===
Chart (2020)	Position
Australian Top Jazz & Blues Albums (ARIA)	7

== Musicians ==
- Zac Hurren (saxophones)
- Sam Keevers (piano)
- Phil Stack (double bass)
- Evan Mannell (drums)

== Release history ==
Region	Date	Format	Label	Catalogue
Australia	8 May 2020	CD; digital download; streaming	ABC Music	0878447
