= First Seed Ripening =

Studio album by Elixir featuring Katie Noonan
- Released: 8 August 2011
- Recorded: ABC studios, Sydney
- Label: ABC Music
- Producer: Katie Noonan

Elixir chronology
Elixir (2003)	First Seed Ripening (2011)

Katie Noonan chronology
Emperor's Box (2010)	First Seed Ripening (2011)	Songs from the British Isles (2011)

First Seed Ripening is the second studio album by Australian jazz band Elixir. The album is credited as featuring Katie Noonan. The album was released in August 2011 and peaked at number 64 on the ARIA Charts and number 1 on the Jazz and Blues chart, where it remained for 9 weeks.

Katie says of the album, "Our aim was to make gentle, intimate music, and it was all about freedom and spontaneity." The album is described as "improvised folk and jazz-inspired blend of music".

The album is inspired by the words of Australian poet Thomas Shapcott.

At the ARIA Music Awards of 2011 it won the ARIA Award for Best Jazz Album.

== Reviews ==
Border mail gave the album 3 1/2 out of 5 saying the album is "Intriguing".

The Mercury; "like a samurai sword through silk….this enchanting, honest, intimate album can’t fail".

The Australian; "Serenely ethereal".

Rave Magazine; "The album’s 14 songs have a seductive pull, helped along by a Nick Drake-level tranquility and, naturally, our heroine’s effortless vocal style".

Sunday Herald Sun; "filled with enchantment…Noonan’s voice, bare and beautiful against husband Zac Hurren’s intimate soprano sax and Stephen Magnusson’s expert jazz guitar, shines like a midnight star".

== Track listing ==
1. "First Seed Ripening" - 5:44
2. "My Skin is a Glove" - 5:56
3. "Stuff of Myths" - 3:51
4. "Pierrot" - 5:33
5. "Traditional Song" - 6:23
6. "Last Flowers to the Hospital" (C Greenwood, E O'Brien, J Greenwood, P Selway, Radiohead, T Yorke) - 5:29
7. "Circle of Moonlight" - 4:14
8. "My Old Man" (Joni Mitchell) - 3:22
9. "Sleep Soundly, Peacefully" - 5:13
10. "Hemispheres" - 6:21
11. "Nocturne" - 6:17
12. "Last Night's Comfort" - 3:44
13. "Snapshot" - 5:13
14. "I Hope I Never" (Tim Finn) - 7:54
- Written-By – I Hurren (tracks: 1, 2, 4, 5, 7, 9 to 11, 13), K Noonan (tracks: 1 to 4, 5, 7, 9 to 13), N Stewart (tracks: 3), S Magnusson (tracks: 1, 2, 4, 5, 7, 10, 11, 13), T Shapcott (tracks: 1 to 4, 5, 7, 9 to 13)

== Weekly charts ==
Chart (2003)	Peak position
Australian Albums (ARIA)	64
Australian Jazz and Blues Albums Chart	1

== Credits ==
- Arranged By [Strings] – Stephen Newcomb
- Artwork, Design, Layout – Kidsincloaks.com
- Cello [The Elixir String Quartet] – Julian Thompson (tracks: 1, 2, 4, 10, 11, 13)
- Double Bass – Jonathan Zwartz (tracks: 1, 4, 7)
- Drums, Cymbal – Simon Barker (tracks: 1, 3, 7)
- Electric Guitar, Steel Guitar, Classical Guitar [Nylon String Guitar] – Stephen Magnusson
- Engineer, Mixed By – Lachlan Carrick
- Mastered By – Oscar Gaona
- Photography By – Will
- Soprano Saxophone, Tenor Saxophone – Zac Hurren
- Strings – The Elixir String Quartet (tracks: 1, 2, 4, 10, 11, 13)
- Viola [The Elixir String Quartet] – Stephen King (tracks: 1, 2, 4, 10, 11, 13)
- Violin [The Elixir String Quartet] – Aiko Goto (tracks: 1, 2, 4, 10, 11, 13), Helena Rathbone (tracks: 1, 2, 4, 10, 11, 13)

== Release history ==
Region	Date	Format	Label	Catalogue
Australia	8 August 2011	CD; digital download	ABC Music	ABC 476 4544
