= Yaron Lifschitz =

Australian director

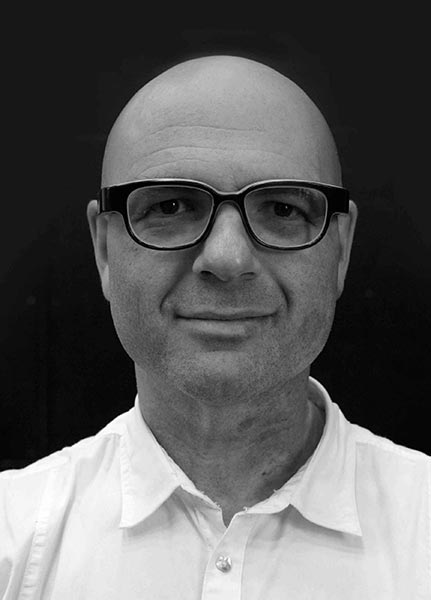
- Lifschitz in 2015
- Born: 30 March 1970 (age 55); Cape Town, South Africa
- Occupations: Artistic Director and CEO
- Children: 2

Yaron Lifschitz (born 30 March 1970) is an Australian director most notable for his involvement in the circus arts. He has directed more than 80 productions over circus, opera, physical theatre, theatre, and large-scale live events. His work has been seen in forty countries, across six continents by over 1 million people. He was the founding Artistic Director of the Australian Museum's theatre unit, Head Tutor in Directing at Australian Theatre for Young People, and has been a regular guest tutor in directing at the National Institute for Dramatic Arts (NIDA) in Sydney since 1995. Lifschitz is currently the artistic director and CEO of Australian contemporary circus company, Circa. He was born in South Africa to a family of Eastern European origin.

== Life ==
Lifschitz was born on 30 March 1970 in Cape Town, South Africa to Jewish parents. In 1981 his family relocated to Australia, settling in the suburbs of Sydney, New South Wales. Of his family's time in Cape Town, Lifschitz is quoted as saying “It was an interesting enclave ... We weren’t observant. There was cooking and Yiddish and community in a way that I haven’t really experienced since.” Lifschitz's father took a position as principal of Masada College on Sydney's upper north shore, where Lifschitz was in the school's first graduating class. He studied history and English at the University of New South Wales, graduating in 1990 with a Bachelor of Arts. He then applied to the prestigious Graduate Directing Program at the National Institute of Dramatic Art in Kensington, Sydney.
