= Circa (contemporary circus) =

Australian contemporary circus company

Circa Contemporary Circus
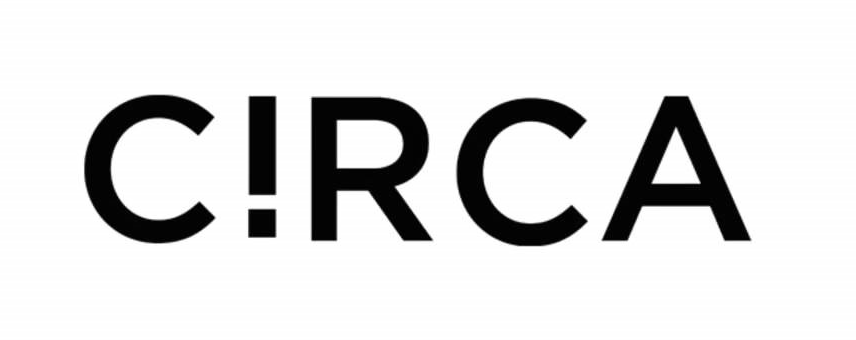
- Industry: Circus
- Founded: 1986
- Founder: Derek Ives and Antonella Casella (Rock n' Roll Circus); Yaron Lifschitz (Circa)
- Headquarters: Brisbane, Queensland, Australia
- Area served: Worldwide
- Key people: Yaron Lifschitz, artistic director & CEO
- Website: circa.org.au

Circa Contemporary Circus, founded as Rock n' Roll Circus in 1986 and now usually referred to as Circa, is an Australian contemporary circus company based in Brisbane, Queensland. Formerly an ensemble-based company, it has changed formation to be director-led under artistic director Yaron Lifschitz since 1999. Its circus productions draw on acrobatics, movement, dance, music, and theatre, and they have toured widely in Australia and internationally.

== History ==
=== Rock n' Roll Circus ===
Originally called Rock n' Roll Circus, Circa's inception was in 1986, when Street Arts Community Theatre commissioned a circus-theatre fused production called 'The Rock & Roll Circus' which performed at The Rialto Theatre. At the conclusion of the project the core group of performers including Antonella Casella, Chris Sleight, Lisa Small, Ceri McCoy, Chantal Eastwell, Robbie McNamara, Richard Teatro, Sally Herbert, and later Derek Ives, expressed interest in continuing as an independent faction to exclusively perform circus. In 1987, led by Ives and Casella, the collective formally splintered off into a new troupe, taking the name of the production and going by "Rock & Roll Circus". Originally an ancillary activity by Street Arts, the troupe evolved to performing their own unique brand of circus fused with music and theatre. Gaining its independence, Street Arts discontinued their presentation of circus, leaving Rock & Roll Circus to be one of the leading forces of circus in Brisbane.

It was an ensemble-based contemporary circus company that focused on performing the voice of the people (particularly the youth of the time) during a politically turbulent time in Queensland during the Joh Bjelke-Petersen era.

With a mission statement of "high energy physical theatre for thrill-starved audiences", the following decade of Rock n Roll's operation was met with much a resounding success, continuing the nouveau cirque movement of combining narrative and thematic elements through physical display. The troupe embarked on its inaugural regional Queensland tour in 1988, and as with the trend of contemporary performance of the time, showcasing productions with a strong political focus on contemporary issues, including disenfranchisement, AIDS education, and youth detention.

=== Transition to "Circa" (1999) ===
While the company enjoyed artistic success nationally and also overseas, the appointment of Yaron Lifschitz as artistic director in 1999 marked a significant shift of focus in the company's repertoire and moved to a more commercial, multi-show model. Lifschitz, the youngest graduate from NIDA's prestigious directing course, made the controversial move to rename the company "Circa" in 2004, rendering Rock n' Roll Circus' history and legacy into obscurity. Circa also relates to the same word as circus‚ "in around, about" which "captures [the company's] questing, questioning attitude" and noting its linguistic similarity in many languages. It changed its structure to more of a director-led company, and was renamed "Circa" in 2004.

With a strong emphasis on dramaturgical, musical, and choreographic consideration when devising productions, and losing the ensemble-based form of creation, Lifschitz's creations have earned Circa both international acclaim and financial success.

== Productions ==
Circa produces circus productions drawing on acrobatics, movement, dance, music, and theatre that tour in Australia and internationally. Its touring shows span diverse contexts from works for families in traditional arts centres to European contemporary arts festivals. In 2014, Circa performed over 360 performances to over 130,000 audience members locally, nationally and internationally. By 2016, Circa had toured to 39 countries across six continents, and been seen by over one million people worldwide.

A diverse palette of music is used in each Circa production, with Lifschitz citing his passion for operatic music as a staple in the company's body of work. The company has performed with both pre-recorded and live music, but unlike its gritty, raw, rock n' roll origin, Circa tends to feature the score of Mozart, Monteverdi, and Shostakovitch.

Many of Circa's works are created either by commission or in collaboration with other global arts organisations. Circa has collaborated with a number of major Australian arts organisations, including Brisbane Festival, La Boite Theatre Company, and Australian Brandenburg Orchestra.

== Awards ==
Circa has received several Helpmann Awards and nominations, including the Helpmann Award for Best Visual or Physical Theatre Production for Il Ritorno in 2016, S in 2013, and CIRCA in 2012, as well as numerous other nominations in the category. CIRCA also won the Helpmann Award for Best Regional Touring Production in 2013, again for Festival of Circa in 2015, and an additional commendation of Helpmann Award for Best Chamber and/or Instrumental Ensemble Concert for the collaboration with Australian Brandenburg Orchestra for French Baroque in 2016.

Outside the Helpmann Awards, Circa has received commendations from the Sidney Myer Performing Arts Group Award in 2013, a Queensland Export Award for Arts & Entertainment in 2012, and a Herald Angel Awards for Best Production for Wunderkammer in 2012.

Following the 2012 collaboration of Love-Song-Circus at Adelaide Cabaret Festival, Katie Noonan released the album Fierce Hearts which contained the musical score and songs which accompanied the show. The highly acclaimed album garnered a nomination for the Best Original Soundtrack/Cast/Show Album at the ARIA Music Awards of 2014

== Selected works ==
=== As Circa ===
- Peepshow (2018)
- Rite (2018)
- Aura (2018)
- Humans (2017)
- One Beautiful Thing (2017)
- Reclaimed Pianos (2016)
- Il Ritorno (2015)
- What Will Have Been (2015)
- Carnival of the Animals (2014)
- Opus (2013)
- Landscape with Monsters (2016)
- Troppo (2016)
- When One Door Closes (2016)
- Close Up (2015)
- French Baroque (2015)
- The Physical Impossibility of Disappearing (2014)
- Beyond (2013)
- "S" (2012)
- How Like an Angel (2012)
- Azure (2012)
- Love Song Circus (2012)
- Wings of Desire (2012)
- Wunderacts (2012)
- Love-Song-Circus (2012)
- Nocturne (2011)
- Wunderkamer (2010)
- On Air (2010)
- Regarding the Joy of Others (2009)
- Circa (2009)
- By the light of the stars that are no longer ... (2008)
- Chroma (2008)
- Furioso (2008)
- Timepieces I-IV (2006)
- 61 Circus Acts in 60 Minutes (2006)
- Cirque du Surreal (2005)
- This Text Has Legs (2005)
- The Space Between (2004)

=== As Rock n' Roll Circus ===
- A Man in a Room (2004)
- Naked (2003)
- Inferno (2003)
- Ficklegravity (2003)
- Anyway I’m Not Alone (2003)
- Figaro Variations (2002)
- Tango (2001)
- Sonata for 10 Hands (2000)
- Jenny and the Tennis Nut (1999)
- Sweetmeets (1998)
- The Labours of Hercules (1998)
- The Dark (1995)
- On Parade / Jabula (1995)
- Circus Under the Tin Top (1993)
- Body Slam (1993)
- Blood on the Butter (1991)
- P.S.S.T. (Practise Safe Sex Today) (1989)
- Rock 'n' Roll Circus (1988)

== See also ==
- List of circuses and circus owners
