= Fierce Hearts =

Soundtrack album by Katie Noonan
- Released: 28 February 2014
- Recorded: Sing Sing Studios
- Genres: Rock music, pop, acoustic, folk rock, jazz
- Label: Kin Music Australia / Universal Music Australia

Katie Noonan chronology
Songbook (2013)	Fierce Hearts (2014)	Songs That Made Me (2014)

Fierce Hearts, or Fierce Hearts: the Music of Love-Song-Circus, is a soundtrack/studio album by Australian singer songwriter Katie Noonan, produced as the soundtrack to contemporary circus Circa's show Love-Song-Circus.

At the ARIA Music Awards of 2014, the album was nominated for Best Original Soundtrack/Cast/Show Album, but lost to Gurrumul: His Life and Music by Geoffrey Gurrumul Yunupingu.

== Background and release ==
Love-Song-Circus is based on the stories of Australia’s first convict women. It combines folk instrumentation, string quartet, piano and Noonan’s voice with the three of Circa’s acrobats/aerialists.

Noonan was inspired by an exhibition at the National Museum of Australia called "Love Tokens". This collection contains 307 tokens dating from 1762-1856, most of them fashioned from the 1797 Cartwheel penny. These pennies proved perfect as tokens – they were cheap, made of a soft copper and were quite large – providing plenty of space for inscriptions. Convicts would engrave them with messages and images for the loved ones they had to leave behind.

Noonan said, "As a woman and mother I felt deeply compelled to explore these stories. I soon discovered that the lives of the first female convicts is a part of our history that has been explored by few".

Love-Song-Circus premiered at the 2012 Adelaide Cabaret Festival. It played again in Melbourne in 2013 and again in 2014 in Brisbane, Adelaide, Melbourne and Sydney.

== Reception ==
Ali Burnie of Beat Music gave the album a positive review saying; "Fierce Hearts – The Music of Love-Song-Circus is folk music at its best. Noonan’s sublime vocals, piano and heartfelt songwriting combines seamlessly with The Gossamer String Quartet, ensuring that this album is a joy to listen to. Drawing us in from the very first track, this beautiful, yet at times very sad album is flawless from start to finish"

== Track listing ==
1. "Fierce Hearts Interlude 1" - 3:40
2. "Esther" - 4:26
3. "Leaden Hearts" - 6:33
4. "Fierce Hearts Interlude 2" - 1:33
5. "Jane" - 2:43
6. "Female Transport" - 4:00
7. "Fierce Hearts Interlude 3" - 3:32
8. "Janet" - 3:44
9. "Space Between Us" - 3:10
10. "Fierce Hearts Interlude 4" - 3:36
11. "Sweet One" - 4:46
12. "Louisa" - 3:55
13. "Leaden Hearts Reprise" - 2:03
14. "Ellen" - 3:26
15. "Mary" - 4:18
16. "Finale" - 4:46

== Credits ==
- Banjo, Acoustic Guitar, Electric Guitar, Resonator Guitar, Mandolin – Benjamin Hauptman
- Cello – Josephine Vains
- Double Bass – Zoe Hauptmann
- Engineer [Assistant] – Aaron Dobos
- Engineer, Mixed By – David Nicholas
- Performer – The Gossamer String Quartet
- Producer, Vocals, Piano – Katie Noonan
- Viola – Caleb Wright
- Violin [1st] – Sarah Curro
- Violin [2nd] – Monica Curro
- Written-By [Strings], Arranged By [Strings] – Stephen Newcomb

== Release history ==
Region	Date	Format	Label	Catalogue
Australia	28 February 2014	CD; digital download	Kin Music Australia / Universal Music Australia	3775715
