= Songs from the British Isles =

EP by Katie Noonan and Karin Schaupp
- Released: 2011
- Recorded: 25–26 March 2011
- Studio: Studio 180, Brisbane
- Genres: Jazz, classical music, pop
- Labels: Katie Noonan and Karin Schaupp
- Producers: Katie Noonan and Karin Schaupp

Katie Noonan chronology
First Seed Ripening (2011)	Songs from the British Isles (2011)	Songs of the Southern Skies (2012)

Karin Schaupp chronology
Cradle Songs (2010)	Songs from the British Isles (2011)	Songs of the Southern Skies (2012)

Songs from the British Isles is a collobrative extended play by Australian singer songwriter Katie Noonan and Australian classical guitarist Karin Schaupp, available only from Katie Noonan webshop. It was released to support the tour 'Songs from the British Isles'.

Katie said; "[it's] a chance to rediscover the Celtic music I grew up around, the classical music I fell in love with and the pop music that has informed my voice as a songwriter in more recent years."

Karin Schaupp said; "For years we’ve been saying ‘We must do something together one day…’ and finally we found the time to make it happen! I am delighted to be collaborating with Katie - her voice is absolutely unique and she is a brilliant musician. The combination of voice and guitar is very intimate but also very versatile. We’ve had a wonderful time putting together this British programme drawn from so many different styles of music, and we’ve become great friends in the process!"

== Background ==
Karin and Katie first performed together at a music festival in 2006. This impromptu performance of a few songs led to a firm friendship and the musical collaboration. The two found they had plenty of similarities; with both performers taught by their mothers, and now mothers themselves, there is a personal understanding that finds its way into the music they make together. Katie added "Both of us in our music making focus on a really pure sound, her on the guitar and me on the voice, We really like to get into the minutiae of dynamics. That's a big part of our approach." The two continued to cross paths until they decided to tour singing songs from the British Isles

== Track listing ==
1. "Last Flowers To The Hospital" (C Greenwood, E O'Brien, J Greenwood, P Selway, Radiohead, T Yorke)
2. "Auld Lang Syne" (Robert Burns)
3. "Favourite Hour" (Elvis Costello)
4. "Roxanne" (Sting)
5. "The Man With The Child In His Eyes" (Kate Bush)
6. "I Will Give my Love an Apple" (Benjamin Britten)
7. "The Fields of Athenry" (Pete St. John)
8. "Solsbury Hill" (Peter Gabriel)

== Katie Noonan and Karin Schaupp 2011 Tour ==
- Wednesday 27 April, Boonah Cultural Centre, Boonah, QLD
- Friday 29 April, Brisbane Powerhouse Theatre, Brisbane, QLD
- Saturday 30 April, Brisbane Powerhouse Theatre, Brisbane, QLD
- Friday 6 May, The Street Theatre, Canberra, ACT
- Saturday 7 May, City Recital Hall Angel Place, Sydney, NSW
- Sunday 8 May, Mother’s Day Lunch @ Lizottes, Newcastle, NSW
- Tuesday 10 May, Camden Haven Music Festival, Camden Haven, NSW
- Thursday 12 May, Melbourne Recital Centre Salon, Melbourne, NSW
- Friday 13 May, Melbourne Recital Centre Salon, Melbourne NSW
- Saturday 14 May, Melbourne Recital Centre Salon, Melbourne NSW
- Wednesday 18 May, Illawarra Performing Arts Centre, Wollongong, NSW
- Friday 20 May, The Boat House, Launceston, TAS
- Saturday 21 May, Wrest Point Show Room, Hobart, TAS
- Friday 27 May, Adelaide Festival Centre, Adelaide, SA
- Saturday 28 May, Adelaide Festival Centre, Adelaide, SA
- Wednesday 1 June, Orange Civic Theatre, Orange, NSW
- Thursday 2 June, St Brigid’s Church, Dubbo, NSW
- Saturday 4 June, Joan Sutherland Performing Arts Centre, Penrith NSW
- Saturday 25 June, Noosa Long Weekend Festival, Noosa, QLD
