= Songs of the Southern Skies =

Studio album by Katie Noonan and Karin Schaupp
- Released: 17 August 2012
- Recorded: Brisbane, Australia
- Genre: Jazz, classical music, pop
- Label: Katie Noonan and Karin Schaupp
- Producer: Katie Noonan and Karin Schaupp

Katie Noonan chronology
Songs from the British Isles (2011)	Songs of the Southern Skies (2012)	Songbook (2013)

Karin Schaupp chronology
Songs from the British Isles (2011)	Songs of the Southern Skies (2012)	Mosaic (2014)

Songs of the Southern Skies is a collobrative studio album by Australian singer songwriter Katie Noonan and Australian classical guitarist Karin Schaupp. The album was released in August 2012 and peaked at number 97 on the ARIA physical albums chart and number 3 on the classical chart.

The album explores music from some of Australia and New Zealand's best classical, folk, jazz and pop songs. The album was recorded in Brisbane, with special guest collaborations including Iva Davies, Gurrumul, Whirimako Black, Diana Doherty, Clare Bowditch and Chris Cheney.

Noonan said; "this project brings together my two main musical loves – classical and pop music. As an artist I love blurring the boundaries of genre and hearing musical worlds collide. This project is a wonderful opportunity for Karin and I to do exactly that!"

The album was toured throughout 2013.

At the ARIA Music Awards of 2012, Songs of the Southern Skies was nominated for 'Best Adult Contemporary' album but lost out to The Ol' Razzle Dazzle by Missy Higgins and 'Best Independent Release' but lost out to Prisoner by The Jezabels.

== Reviews ==
Arts Hub said; "I believe it’s the huge dose of heart which is key to moving this album from ‘just a compilation’ to something else entirely – perhaps I even dare say slightly spiritual. Noonan and Schaupp are masters of their craft; together they create magic"

The Australian said; "Katie Noonan has a voice like warm honey being decanted into melting snow. It is such a thing of beauty that finding a vessel to hold it can be difficult…Happily, in the music of acclaimed German-born classical guitarist Karin Schaupp, Noonan has found the perfect companion"

themusic.com.au said; "This pairing of two like-minded musicians is fortunately a union made in recording heaven on this collaboration…These songs were obviously chosen for their intimacy and melodic depth, as there isn’t one weak moment on the album"

== Track listing ==
1. "Into My Arms" (Originally by Nick Cave) - 4:39
2. "Into Temptation" (Originally by Crowded House) - 4:26
3. "Hearts a Mess" (Originally by Gotye) - 5:21
4. "Man of Colours" (Originally by Icehouse) with special guest Iva Davies & Diana Doherty - 4:53
5. "I Hope I Never" (Originally By Split Enz) - 3:31
6. "Emperor's Box" (Originally by Katie Noonan and The Captains) with special guest Clare Bowditch and Dan Curro - 4:18
7. "Saturday Night" (Originally By Cold Chisel) - 3:04
8. "Rainbow Cake" (Originally by Vince Jones) - 3:22
9. "When I See You Smile" (Originally by Bic Runga) - 3:06
10. "Baywarra" (Originally by Gurrumul) with special guests Gurrumul and Chris Cheney - 3:19
11. "Blue Smoke" (Originally by Ruru Karaitiana) with special guest Whirimako Black - 4:01
12. "Bless This House" (Originally by Mae Brahe) - 2:56
13. "All Things Conspire" - 3:07
14. "Hine E Hine" (Princess Te Rangi Pai) - 3:08
15. "Southern Cross Dreaming" (Originally by Richard Charlton) - 4:14
16. "Bora Ring" - 2:49
17. "Friday on My Mind" (Originally by The Easybeats) - 2:49 [iTunes Bonus track]

== Weekly charts ==
Chart (2003)	Peak position
Australian Physical Albums Chart	97
Australian Classical Albums Chart	3

== Release history ==
Region	Date	Format	Label	Catalogue
Australia	17 August 2012	CD; digital download	Katie Noonan and Karin Schaupp	3713279
