= Time to Begin =

- CD single cover

Single by Katie Noonan

from the album Skin
- B-side: "Love's My Song for You"/"Black Hole Sun"
- Released: 2007
- Length: 3:40
- Label: Mushroom; Warner Music Australia
- Songwriter(s): Andrew Klippel; Katie Noonan
- Producer(s): Andrew Klippel

"Time to Begin" is a song by Australian singer songwriter Katie Noonan. It is included on her 2007 album, Skin. The song peaked at number 30 in Australia, becoming Noonan's highest charting single to date.

The song earned Noonan a nomination for Best Female Artist at the ARIA Music Awards of 2007, but lost to On a Clear Night by Missy Higgins.

A black and white music video was released to promote the song. It was directed by fifty fifty films.

== Track listings ==
Digital download (1-track)

1. "Time to Begin" – 3:40

CD single/Digital download (5144212092)

1. "Time to Begin" – 3:40
2. "Love's My Song for You" (Orchestral Version) – 4:30
3. "Black Hole Sun" – 3:27
4. "Time to Begin" (Future Jazz Force Remix) – 6:21

== Charts ==
Weekly chart performance for "Time to Begin"
| Chart (2007) | Peak position |
|---|---|
| Australia (ARIA) | 30 |
