= Skin (Katie Noonan album) =

Studio album by Katie Noonan
- Released: 13 August 2007
- Genres: Pop, jazz
- Length: 67:25
- Labels: Festival Mushroom Records; Warner Bros. Records
- Producer: Andrew Klippel

Katie Noonan chronology
Before Time Could Change Us (2005)	Skin (2007)	Second Skin (2008)

Skin is a studio album by Australian musician Katie Noonan. It was released in August 2007 and peaked at number 6 on the Australian ARIA Charts. Skin was the first album released by Noonan as a solo artist and recorded between the time of 3 and 8 months pregnant. Noonan says: "I love the themes I explored on this album – I was a madly in love newlywed, experiencing the miracle of pregnancy – it was quite a trip to document! Inspired by Donny Hathaway, Aretha Franklin, Stevie Wonder and Vince Jones, this album was all about exploring groove for me. I learn’t a huge amount making this album and I am really grateful for the arduous journey I took with this process, as since then, it has confirmed my instinct to listen to and trust my inner voice."

== Reviews ==
Bernard Zuel from Sydney Morning Herald said "Her first solo album finds her mostly dabbling in a kind of fluttering, '70s soul jazz reminiscent of, among others, Minnie Riperton." adding "The songs have a basement soul feel. That is, as with any number of competent jazz funk bands you may see at the Sydney venue on a Friday night, there's a groove, but apart from "Return", it never sinks in beneath the skin. Across them Noonan's lyrics are not awful but they rarely say something that couldn't have been done by a committee."

== Track listing ==
1. "Logic" - 2:47
2. "Return" - 3:32
3. "Time to Begin" - 4:25
4. "Love's My Song for You" - 4:06
5. "Little Boy Man" - 3:22
6. "Sunshine" - 3:31
7. "One Step" - 3:48
8. "Home" - 4:19
9. "Send Out a Little Love" - 3:51
10. "Who Are You?" - 4:30
11. "Bluebird" - 4:43
12. "A Little Smile" - 3:05

=== Bonus disc ===
1. "Special Ones"
2. "Crazy"
3. "I Think I Am"
4. "Choir Girl"
5. "Breathe In Now"

== Charts ==
=== Weekly charts ===
Chart (2007)	Peak position
Australian Albums (ARIA)	6
Australian Artist Albums Chart	1

=== Year-end charts ===
Chart (2007)	Rank
Australian Artist Albums Chart	48
