= Katie Noonan =

Australian singer and songwriter

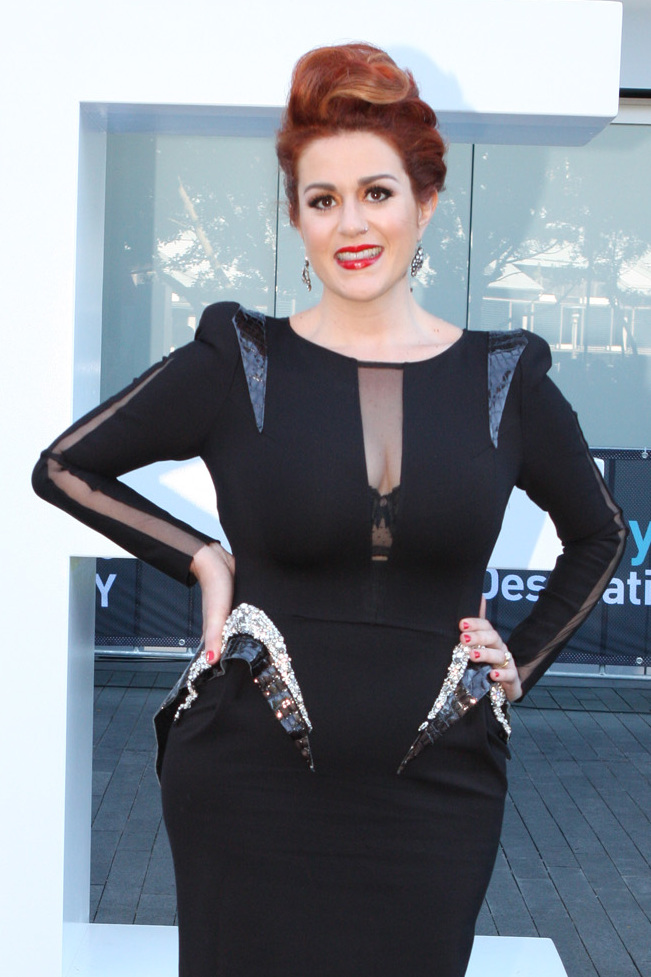
- Noonan in 2013

Background information
- Born: Katie Anne Noonan; Brisbane, Queensland, Australia
- Genres: Alternative rock, jazz, opera
- Occupation: Singer songwriter
- Instruments: Vocals, keyboards
- Years active: 1996–present
- Label: Festival Mushroom
- Formerly of: George, Elixir
- Website: katienoonan.com.au

Katie Anne Noonan is an Australian singer and songwriter. After an early career as the singer in the bands George and Elixir, she forged a successful solo career, becoming known mainly for her jazz style, but also encompassing, pop, rock, and dance music. She has also performed with her mother Maggie Noonan and her band the Captains. Noonan's 30th career album (24 solo, 2 with George and 6 with Elixir) Alone But All One was released in June 2026.

== Early life and education ==
Katie Anne Noonan grew up with a strong background in classical music, with her mother Maggie being a well-known opera singer.

She studied first opera, and then jazz, at the Queensland Conservatorium.

== Career ==
=== George ===
After graduation, Noonan began fronting the pop-rock group George, along with her brother Tyrone Noonan. Noonan founded George with her brother, with whom she shared lead vocals, in 1996 to enter a university music competition. After a series of successful independently released EPs, they signed to Festival Mushroom Records and released the debut album Polyserena in 2002. It debuted at the number 1 position on the Australian Recording Industry Association (ARIA) albums chart. George won the Breakthrough Artist ARIA award in 2002 and performed the song "Breathe in Now" at the award ceremony.

=== Elixir ===
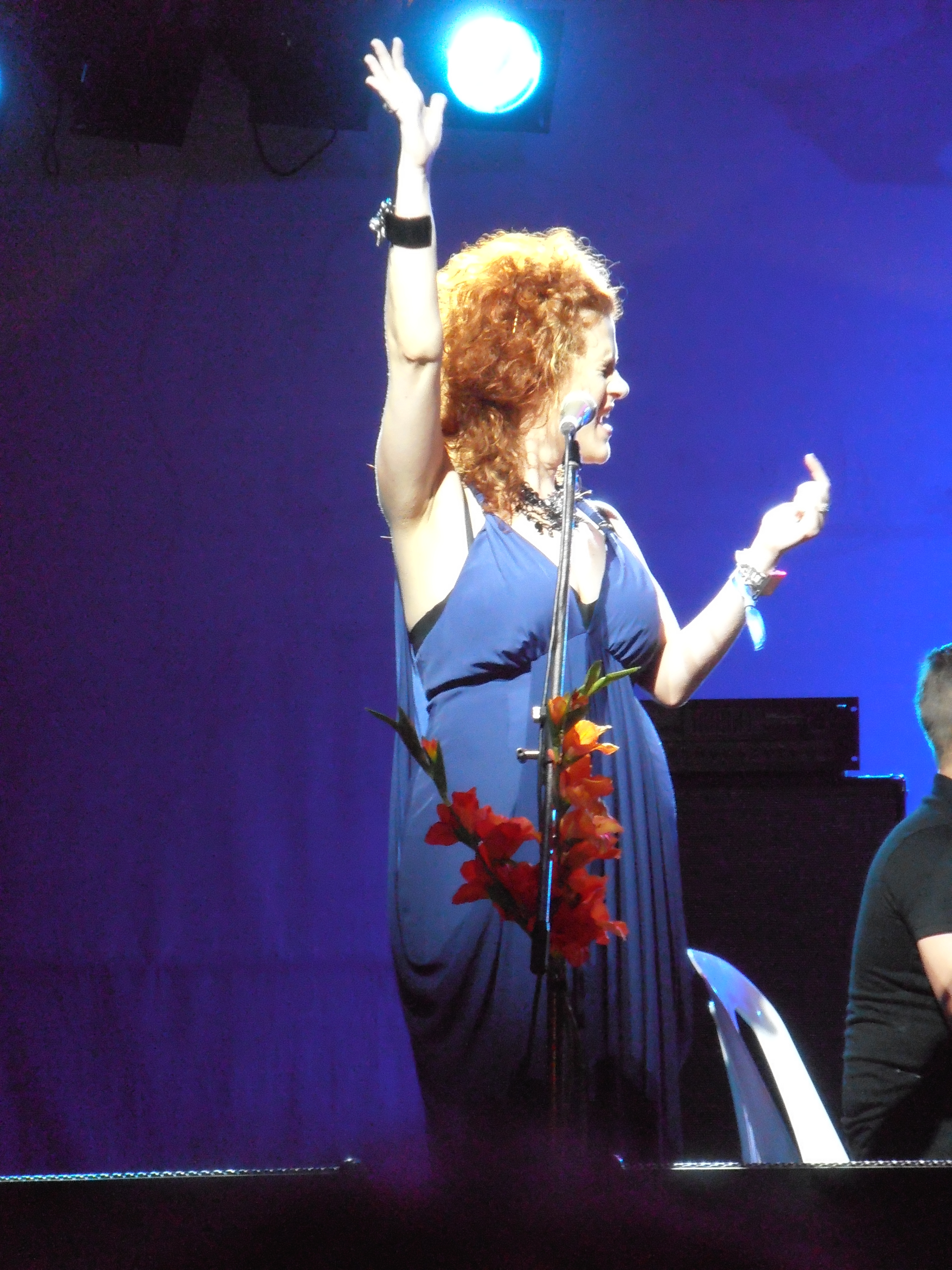
Noonan performing with Elixir at the Woodford Folk Festival, 29 December 2011

Noonan founded the jazz trio Elixir in 1997, which released their debut self-titled album in 2003. Elixir's second album, First Seed Ripening, was released on 5 August 2011. It won the 2011 ARIA Award for Best Jazz Album.

=== 2004: Two of a Kind ===
Noonan released an album of jazz and operatic duets with her mother in 2004. Entitled Two of a Kind, the album was released by the ABC Classics label.

In 2004, Noonan guest appeared at the Lord Of The Rings Symphony performances. The reviewer Murray Black said that "The undoubted highlight of the evening was guest vocalist Katie Noonan. Here is a rare talent with a voice of extraordinary beauty and versatility. In most of her solos, she sounded like a classical soprano as she soared over the orchestra with a spine-tingling, vibrato-less angelic purity. Then, in Gollum's Song and the Oscar-winning Into the West, she revealed her pop diva credentials with her strong, clear voice projecting effortlessly out in the audience."

=== 2005: Before Time Could Change Us and the Broad Festival ===
Paul Grabowsky and Noonan teamed up for the jazz cycle Before Time Could Change Us. Consisting of words written by Dorothy Porter, the album tracks "the mysterious shifts and changes of a relationship". The album won the 2005 ARIA Award for Best Jazz Album.

Later in 2005, Noonan was invited by Deborah Conway to take part in the Broad Festival project—together with three other Australian female artists they performed their own and each other's songs. Sara Storer, Ruby Hunter and Clare Bowditch were the other female artists.

=== 2007: Skin and Second Skin ===
Noonan recorded a solo album entitled Skin at Sydney's Linear Recording in 2006. Produced by Andrew Klippel, Skin was released on 11 August 2007 and debuted at number 6 on the ARIA Top 50 album charts and number 1 on the Australian ARIA Top 20 album chart. The debut single, "Time To Begin", debuted at number 30 on the ARIA Top 50.

Following the success of the remix of "Time To Begin", Noonan collaborated with John Course and Mr Timothy. The collaboration involved the re-recording of Noonan's vocal tracks and a dance version of her solo album was released under the title Second Skin.

On 22 February 2008, Noonan was a support act for Cyndi Lauper at King's Park Botanic Gardens, Perth, Western Australia, and was invited on stage by Lauper to sing along to "Girls Just Want to Have Fun". Also in 2008, Noonan was featured as the vocalist in Telstra's "I Am Australian" series of advertisements.

=== 2008: Blackbird: The Music of Lennon and McCartney ===
Noonan released a jazz album of Lennon and McCartney cover versions in 2008 entitled Blackbird: The Music of Lennon and McCartney.

=== 2010: Emperor's Box ===
The Katie Noonan and the Captains' album Emperor's Box was created over a three-year period and is Noonan's second release for Sony Music. She wrote all of the songs and collaborated with the following artists during the recording of the album: Tim Finn (Split Enz), Sia, Don Walker (Cold Chisel), Josh Pyke and Australian writer/poet Tom Shapcott. The album was co-produced by Noonan and Nick DiDia (Pearl Jam, Bruce Springsteen, Stone Temple Pilots, Powderfinger). It was preceded by the single "Page One" released in February.

=== 2011–2012: Songs from the British Isles and Songs of the Southern Skies ===
In 2011, Noonan collaborated with Karin Schaupp and toured Songs from the British Isles. An EP was released available only from Noonan's website. In 2012, the two recorded Songs of the Southern Skies. The album was nominated for two ARIA Awards at the 2012 ceremony.

=== 2013: Songbook and Fierce Hearts ===
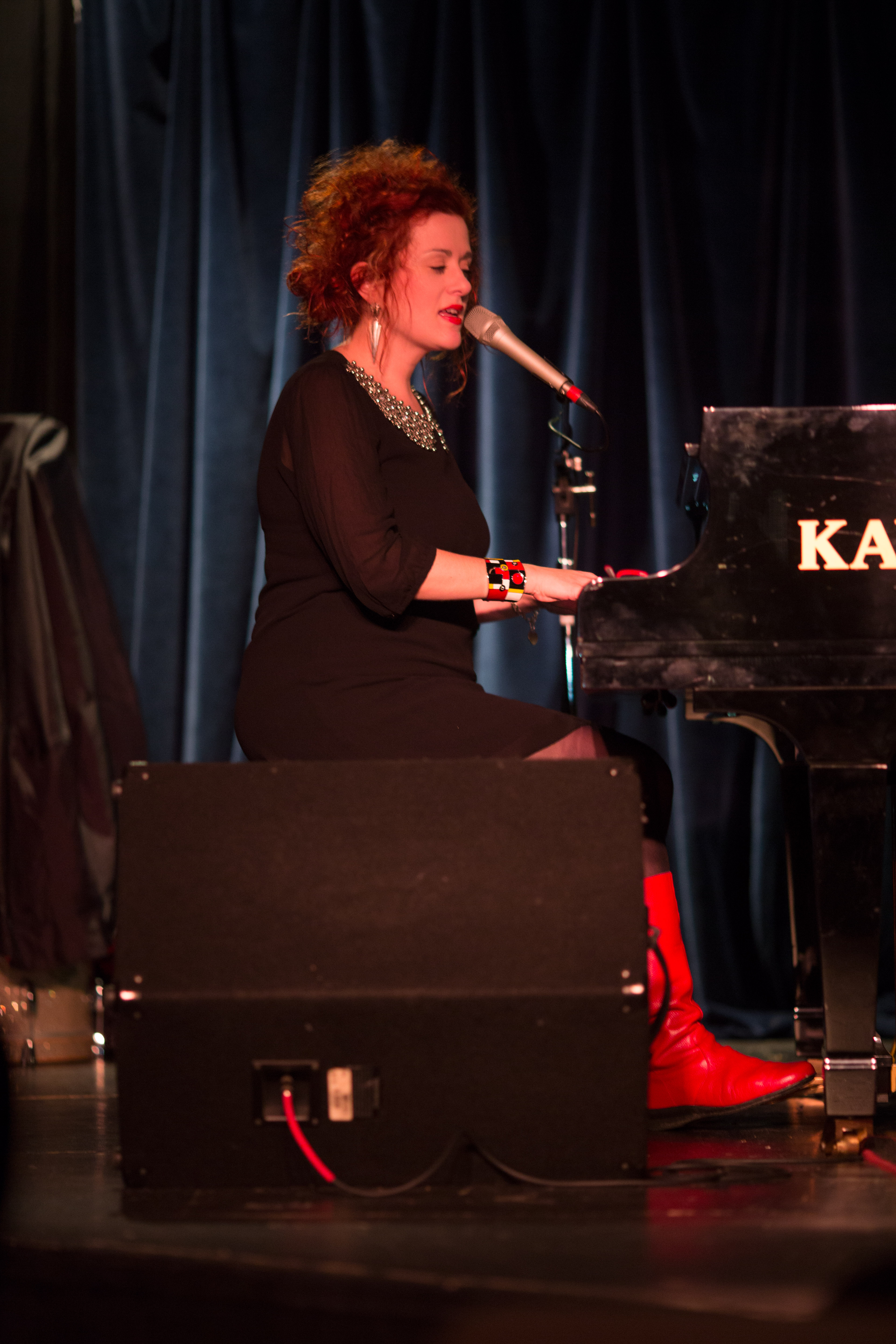
Noonan in 2013

In 2013, Noonan released Songbook, an album that saw her re-recording songs from her time in George and Elixir. She also worked with the Sydney Dance Company on the production Les Illuminations.

=== 2014: Fierce Hearts ===
In 2014, she released Fierce Hearts which was nominated for an ARIA Award at the 2014 ceremony. It was music alongside a contemporary circus show by Circa.

=== 2015: Transmutant ===
In 2015, Noonan released Transmutant through Universal Music Australia. The album peaked at number 33 on the ARIA Charts.

=== 2016: With Love and Fury ===
In 2016, Noonan collaborated with the Brodsky Quartet and released With Love and Fury in April. They toured Australia throughout April and May.

=== 2017: Songs of the Latin Skies ===
In December 2016, Noonan announced the release Songs of the Latin Skies with Karin Schaupp. The album was released in February 2017 and saw the duo embark on a musical journey through the South American songbook, exploring the sounds and beats of the bossa nova, salsa, tango and samba. The duo played live shows across the country throughout 2017.

=== 2018: Gratitude and Grief ===
In 2018, Noonan reunited with Elixir and released Gratitude and Grief in August 2018. The album was nominated for Best Jazz album at the 2018 ARIA Awards.

=== 2019: The Little Green Road to Fairyland and The Glad Tomorrow ===
In April 2019, Noonan released The Little Green Road to Fairyland with Camerata and the Queensland Chamber Orchestra. In August, Noonan collaborated with the Australian String Quartet for The Glad Tomorrow. The new album sees Noonan perform uniquely Australian poetry of Queenslander and First Nations icon Oodgeroo Noonuccal to music.

=== 2020: Late Night Tunes with Noons and The Sweetest Taboo ===
In January 2020, Noonan confirmed the release of a mini-album titled Late Night Tunes with Noons. The album featured Noonan covering a range of Australian songs, with the inclusion of one original track.

In May 2020, Noonan released her twentieth album, The Sweetest Taboo, a jazz album covering 1980s pop songs.

=== 2021: AVÉ ===
In May 2021, Noonan launched the Australian Vocal Ensemble (AVÉ), an a cappella quartet. The other members are tenor Andrew Goodwin, mezzo-soprano Fiona Campbell and bass-baritone Andrew O'Connor.

=== 2023: Joni Mitchell's Blue tour ===
In January 2023, Noonan commenced a national tour of 40 concerts, performing the entirety of Joni Mitchell's seminal album Blue, marking the 50th anniversary since its release. Usually accompanied by a single acoustic guitarist, the first concert took place at the 2023 Sydney Festival with the final concert in Bendigo, Victoria, on 16 September 2023.

=== 2025: Jeff Buckley's Grace tour ===
In 2025, Noonan toured Jeff Buckley's Grace album.

=== 2026: Alone But All One ===
In March 2026, Noonan released "This Isn't What I Signed Up For", the lead single from her Alone But All One album, which was released on 26 June 2026. The lyrics were co-written by her old friend, writer Trent Dalton, and tell of the joy of love, the pain of heartbreak, and the healing that follows. She followed up with a tour in October 2026.

== Other activities ==
A National Office for Live Music was launched by Australian prime minister Kevin Rudd in July 2013 and, as of August 2013, Noonan is the state ambassador for Queensland.

In 2013, Noonan combined with the Sydney Dance Company and musicians from the Sydney Symphony Orchestra and conductor Richard Gill to perform Britten's song cycle Les Illuminations at Sydney's City Recital Hall Angel Place. This production was taken in 2014 to Brisbane's QPAC with the Queensland Symphony Orchestra under Johannes Fritzsch.

In 2014, Noonan was part of the I Touch Myself Project, with a mission to encourage young women to touch themselves regularly to find early signs of cancer. They released a version of "I Touch Myself" which peaked at number 72 on the ARIA singles chart.

Noonan was the official ambassador to the Adelaide Fringe in 2014.

In 2018, Noonan was musical director of and performed at the 2018 Commonwealth Games' opening and closing ceremonies.

In August 2020, Noonan was unmasked as the "Sloth" in the second season of The Masked Singer Australia. She was the fourth contestant revealed, placing 9th overall.

In February 2021, Noonan was announced as the artistic director of the National Folk Festival.

On 25 September 2022, Noonan sang the National Anthem at the pre-game ceremony of the 2022 AFL Grand Final at the Melbourne Cricket Ground.

== Personal life ==
Noonan was married to Isaac Hurren, her longtime partner and collaborator in Elixir, from 2004 to 2024. They are parents to two sons. The marriage ended in November 2024.

On 8 November 2026, Noonan was featured on Australian Story on ABC Television, in an episode entitled Second Start. In the program, she talks about the grief of her marriage breakup and subsequent estrangement from her sons, as well as how she uses music to process her emotions. Writer Trent Dalton, who co-wrote the lyrics to her latest album, also appears in the show.

== Discography ==
=== Studio albums ===
List of albums, with Australian chart positions and notes
Title	Album details	Peak chart positions	Notes
Title	Album details	AUS	Notes
Two of a Kind Katie and Maggie Noonan	Released: 5 April 2004; Label: ABC Music; Formats: CD, digital download	61	Number 2 on the ARIA Classical Chart; Number 16 on the ARIA Australian Artist Chart
Before Time Could Change Us Paul Grabowsky and Kate Noonan	Released: 15 August 2005; Label: Paul Grabowsky & Katie Noonan; Formats: Digital download	65	Number 3 on the ARIA Jazz Chart
Skin	Released: 13 August 2007; Label: Mushroom, Warner Music Australia; Formats: CD, digital download	6	48 on the ARIA Australian Artists End of Year Chart (2007); Includes the top 30 single "Time to Begin"
Second Skin John Course & mrTimothy present Katie Noonan	Released: 21 April 2008; Label: Warner Music Australia; Formats: CD, digital download	156	A remix project from the album Skin.; Number 19 on ARIA Dance Chart.
Blackbird: The Music of Lennon and McCartney	Released: 27 October 2008; Label: Sony BMG Music Entertainment; Formats: CD, digital download	43	Number 7 on ARIA End of Year Jazz Chart (2008); Number 11 on ARIA End of Year Jazz Chart (2009); Number 32 on ARIA End of Year Jazz Chart (2010)
Emperor's Box Katie Noonan and The Captains	Released: April 2010; Label: Sony Music Australia; Formats: CD, digital download	21	
First Seed Ripening (Elixir featuring Katie Noonan)	Released: 8 August 2011; Label: ABC Music; Formats: CD, digital download	64	Elixir is a band Noonan co-founded in 1997. This album is credited as 'featuring' Katie Noonan'.; Number 1 on the Jazz and Blues chart.
Songs from the British Isles	Released: 2011; Label: Katie Noonan and Karin Schaupp; Formats: digital download	—	A covers album of British songs; Available only from Noonan's website
Songs of the Southern Skies (Katie Noonan and Karin Schaupp)	Released: 17 August 2012; Label: Katie Noonan and Karin Schaupp; Formats: CD, digital download	—	A covers album of Australian/New Zealand songs; Number 3 on the ARIA Classical chart. Number 97 on the ARIA physical chart.
Songbook	Released: 13 January 2013; Label: KIN Music; Formats: CD, digital download	—	
Fierce Hearts (The Music of Love-Song-Circus)	Released: 28 February 2014; Label: KIN Music; Formats: CD, digital download	—	Music from the circus group, Circa
Songs That Made Me Katie Noonan and Various Artists	Released: 17 October 2014; Label: Kin Music; Formats: CD, digital download	—	Katie Noonan and friends; Number 7 on the ARIA compilation chart
Transmutant Katie Noonan's Vanguard	Released: 24 July 2015; Label: Universal Music Australia; Formats: CD, digital download	33	
With Love and Fury Brodsky Quartet and Katie Noon	Released: 19 April 2016; Label:KIN Music; Formats: CD, digital download	—	
Songs of the Latin Skies (Katie Noonan and Karin Schaupp)	Released: 17 February 2017; Label: Katie Noonan and Karin Schaupp; Formats: digital download, CD	—	A covers album of South American songs
Gratitude and Grief (Elixir featuring Katie Noonan)	Released: 31 August 2018; Label: Kin Music; Formats: digital download, CD	—	
The Little Green Road to Fairyland (Katie Noonan, Camerata with the Queensland Chamber Orchestra)	Released: 19 April 2019; Label: ABC Music; Formats: digital download, CD, streaming	—	
The Glad Tomorrow (Katie Noonan with the Australian String Quartet)	Released: 30 August 2019; Label: Kin Music; Formats: digital download, CD, streaming	—	Australian poetry of Queenslander and First Nations icon Oodgeroo Noonuccal to music
Late Night Tunes with Noons	Released: 14 February 2020; Label: Kin Music; Formats: digital download, CD, streaming	—	A covers album of Australian songs
The Sweetest Taboo	Released: 8 May 2020; Label: ABC Classics; Formats: digital download, CD, streaming	70	Jazz versions of 1980s pop songs; Number 1 on the ARIA Jazz and Blues Chart.
Joni Mitchell's Blue	Released: May 2023; Label: Kin Music; Formats: digital download, streaming	—	A covers album of Joni Mitchell songs
A Small Shy Truth (Elixir featuring Katie Noonan, Zac Hurren & Ben Hauptmann)	Released: 27 October 2023; Label: Kin Music; Formats: digital download, CD, streaming	—	
Songs of the Southern Skies Vol 2	Released: 18 October 2024; Label: Katie Noonan and Karin Schaupp; Formats: CD, digital download	—	A covers album of Australian/New Zealand songs
Alone but All One	Released: 26 June 2026; Label: Katie Noonan; Formats: CD, digital download	20	

=== Extended plays ===
List of EPs, with selected details
Title	Details
Jeff Buckley’s Grace Acoustic EP	Released: 5 September 2025; Label: Kin Music; Formats: digital download, streaming

=== Charted singles ===
List of charted singles, with selected chart positions
Title	Year	Peak chart positions	Album
Title	Year	AUS	Album
"Time to Begin"	2007	30	Skin

== Awards and nominations ==
=== AIR Awards ===
The Australian Independent Record Awards (commonly known informally as the AIR Awards) is an annual awards night to recognise, promote and celebrate the success of Australia's independent music sector.

Year	Nominee / work	Award	Result	Ref.
2011	First Seed Ripening	Best Independent Jazz Album	Nominated	
2020	The Glad Tomorrow	Best Independent Classical Album	Nominated	
2021	The Sweetest Taboo	Best Independent Jazz Album or EP	Won	
2024	A Small Shy Truth (Elixir featuring Katie Noonan, Zac Hurren & Ben Hauptmann)	Best Independent Jazz Album or EP	Won	
2025	Songs of the Southern Skies Vol 2 (with Karin Schaupp)	Best Independent Classical Album or EP	Nominated	

=== ARIA Music Awards ===
The ARIA Music Awards are annual awards which recognises excellence, innovation and achievement across all genres of Australian music. Noonan has won four awards from twelve nominations. In addition to that, she won one award from eight nominations during her time with band george.

Year	Nominee / work	Award	Result	Ref.
2005	Before Time Could Change Us (with Paul Grabowsky)	Best Jazz Album	Won	
2007	"Time to Begin"	Best Female Artist	Nominated	
2008	Skin	Best Adult Contemporary Album	Nominated	
2009	Blackbird: The Music of Lennon and McCartney	Best Jazz Album	Won	
2011	First Seed Ripening (with Elixir)	Best Jazz Album	Won	
2012	Songs of the Southern Skies (with Karin Schaupp)	Best Adult Contemporary Album	Nominated	
2012	Songs of the Southern Skies (with Karin Schaupp)	Best Independent Release	Nominated	
2014	Fierce Hearts (The Music Of Love – Song – Circus)	Best Original Soundtrack/Cast/Show Album	Nominated	
2016	With Love and Fury (with Brodsky Quartet)	Best Classical Album	Nominated	
2017	Songs of the Latin Skies (with Karin Schaupp)	Best World Music Album	Won	
2018	Gratitude and Grief (with Elixir)	Best Jazz Album	Nominated	
2020	The Sweetest Taboo	Best Jazz Album	Nominated	
2024	A Small Shy Truth (Elixir featuring Katie Noonan, Zac Hurren & Ben Hauptmann)	Best Jazz Album	Nominated	

=== Australian Women in Music Awards ===
The Australian Women in Music Awards is an annual event that celebrates outstanding women in the Australian Music Industry who have made significant and lasting contributions in their chosen field. They commenced in 2018.

Year	Nominee / work	Award	Result	Ref.
2018	Katie Noonan	Creative Leadership Award	Nominated	
2019	Katie Noonan	Creative Leadership Award	Won	
2021	Katie Noonan	Artistic Excellence Award	Nominated	
2024	Katie Noonan	Artistic Excellence Award	Pending	

=== National Live Music Awards ===
The National Live Music Awards (NLMAs) commenced in 2016 to recognise contributions to the live music industry in Australia.

Year	Nominee / work	Award	Result	Ref.
2023	Katie Noonan	Best Live Voice in Qld	Won	
2023	Australian Vocal Ensemble (AVÉ) (featuring Katie Noonan, Fiona Campbell, Andrew Goodwin and Andrew O'Connor)	Best Classical Act	Nominated	
