= Stu Hunter =

Australian musician and record producer

- Genre: Jazz

Stu Hunter is an Australian musician and record producer. His album The Migration was nominated for 2016 ARIA Award for Best Jazz Album.

== Discography ==
=== Albums ===
Title	Details
The Muse	Released: 2007; Label: Stu Hunter; Format: CD
The Gathering	Released: 2009; Label: Vitamin; Format: CD
The Migration	Released: 2016; Label: Habitat Productions; Format: CD

== Awards and nominations ==
=== AIR Awards ===
The Australian Independent Record Awards (commonly known informally as AIR Awards) is an annual awards night to recognise, promote and celebrate the success of Australia's Independent Music sector.

Year	Nominee / work	Award	Result
2010	The Gathering	Best Independent Jazz Album	Won

=== ARIA Music Awards ===
The ARIA Music Awards is an annual awards ceremony held by the Australian Recording Industry Association.

Year	Nominee / work	Award	Result	Ref.
2016	The Migration	Best Jazz Album	Nominated	
