= Elixir (Australian band) =

Australian jazz band

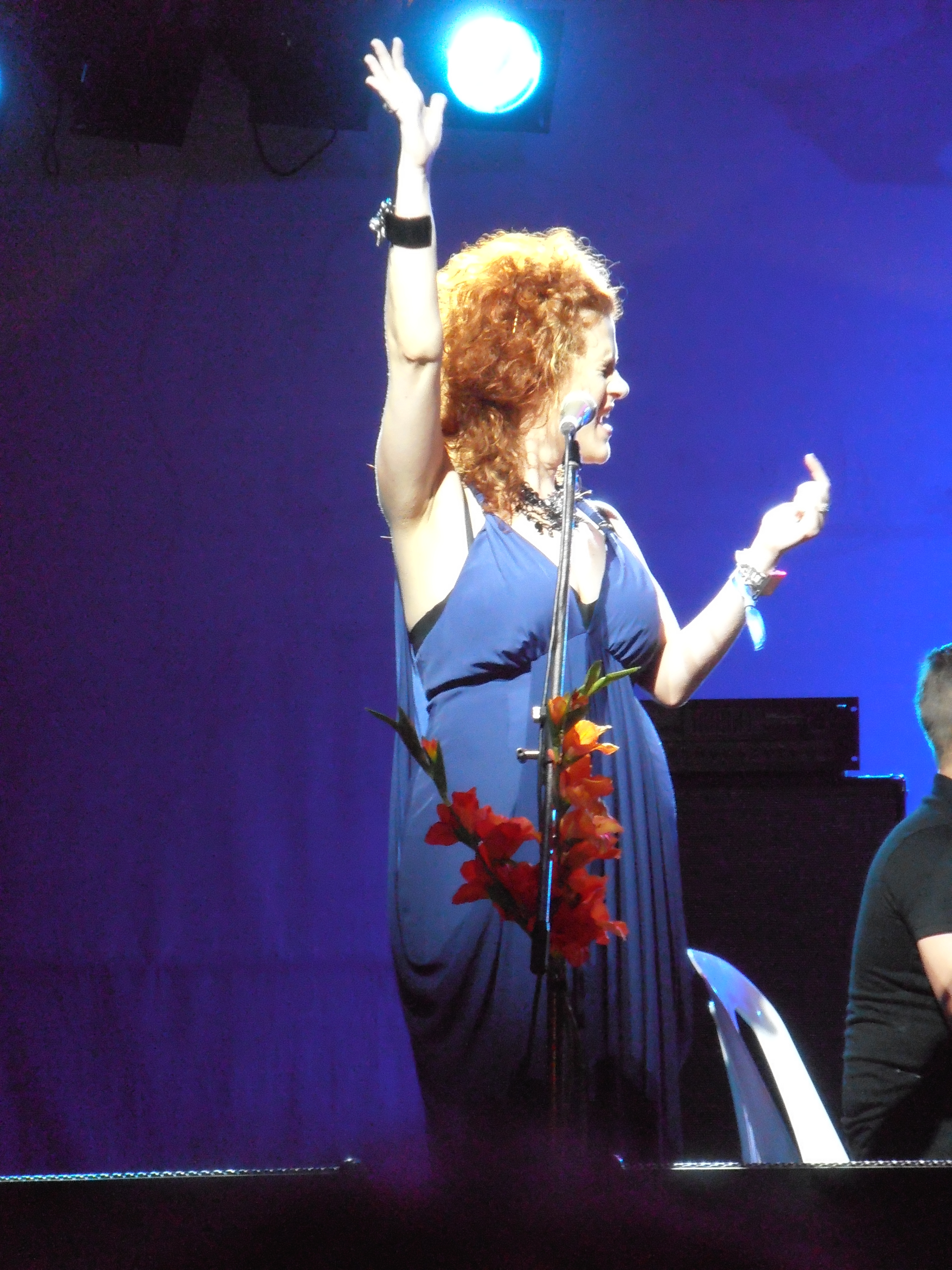
- Noonan performing with Elixir at the Woodford Folk Festival, 29 December 2011

Background information
- Origin: Brisbane, Queensland, Australia
- Genres: jazz music
- Years active: 1997–present
- Labels: Kin Records, Festival Mushroom Records; ABC Music
- Members: Katie Noonan; Isaac Hurren; Stephen Magnusson; Michael Leunig
- Past members: River Petein, Nick Stewart

Elixir is an Australian jazz trio formed in Brisbane in 1997 by Katie Noonan and Nick Stewart from ARIA award-winning, double-platinum selling band george and River Petein. Isaac Hurren joined the group prior to the release of their debut album. Since then Petein and Stewart have left while Stephen Magnusson joined the group on jazz guitar in 2005.

To date, they have released two studio albums and have won an ARIA Award. "We’re about freedom and spontaneity, particularly in a live set," explains Noonan.

== Studio albums ==
| Title | Album details | Peak chart positions |
| Title | Album details | AUS |
|---|---|---|
| Elixir | Released: 19 May 2003; Label: Kin Records, Festival Mushroom Records; Format: CD, digital download | 24 |
| First Seed Ripening | Released: 5 August 2011; Label: ABC Music; Format: CD, digital download | 64 |
| Gratitude and Grief (featuring Katie Noonan) | Released: 31 August 2018; Label: Kin Music; Format: CD, digital download | |
| A Small Shy Truth (featuring Katie Noonan, Zac Hurren & Ben Hauptmann) | Released: 27 October 2023; Label: Kin Music; Format: digital download | |

== Awards and nominations ==
=== AIR Awards ===
The Australian Independent Record Awards (commonly known informally as AIR Awards) is an annual awards night to recognise, promote and celebrate the success of Australia's Independent Music sector.

| Year | Nominee / work | Award | Result | Ref. |
|---|---|---|---|---|
| 2011 | First Seed Ripening | Best Independent Jazz Album | Nominated | |
| 2024 | A Small Shy Truth | Best Independent Jazz Album or EP | Won | |

=== ARIA Music Awards ===
The ARIA Music Awards is an annual awards ceremony that recognises excellence, innovation, and achievement across all genres of Australian music.

| Year | Nominee / work | Award | Result | Ref. |
|---|---|---|---|---|
| 2011 | First Seed Ripening | Best Jazz Album | Won | |
| 2018 | Gratitude and Grief | Best Jazz Album | Nominated | |
| 2024 | A Small Shy Truth | Best Jazz Album | Nominated | |
