= Goldner String Quartet =

Australian string quartet

The Goldner String Quartet was an Australian string quartet formed in 1995 in honour of Richard Goldner, the founder of Musica Viva Australia, and disbanded at the end of 2024.

== History ==
In 1997 the Goldner String Quartet made its debut at the Wigmore Hall in London, and has since appeared there regularly, as well as at the Cheltenham, Newbury and Brighton Festivals, and at the Saison musicale d'été de Sceaux (Note: Festival de l'Orangerie, in Sceaux, Hauts-de-Seine?) in France. In March 2000, the Quartet performed a major retrospective of 20th century string quartets at the Adelaide Festival. In October 2001 the Quartet made its American debut with concerts at the 92nd Street Y in New York City, and in Washington, D.C. It has undertaken three extensive tours of New Zealand, including in 2006, and also toured to Korea that year.

The quartet performed its first complete Beethoven cycle for Musica Viva in 2004, a live recording of which has been released by ABC Classics. It is particularly interested in 20th-century music, and has recorded an album of string quartets by Carl Vine. BBC Music Magazine judged the Goldners' recording of music by Ernest Bloch "one of the year's top three releases".

The Goldners have played throughout Australia and New Zealand, as well in the UK, USA, Korea, Finland, France and Italy, and with artists such as Boris Berman, Ian Munro, Piers Lane, Daniel Adni, Malcolm Bilson, Brett Dean and Slava Grigoryan.

=== Dissolution announced ===
In August 2023 the Goldner String Quartet announced that the 2024 season would be its last.

== Members ==
The quartet consists of Dene Olding and Dimity Hall (violins), Irina Morozova (viola; an ex-pupil of Goldner) and Julian Smiles (cello). These players are familiar to each other as they all are members of the Australia Ensemble (a group based at the University of New South Wales). In addition, Olding and Morozova are married, as are Hall and Smiles.

== Awards and nominations ==
=== ARIA Music Awards ===
The ARIA Music Awards is an annual awards ceremony that recognises excellence, innovation, and achievement across all genres of Australian music. They commenced in 1987.

| Year | Nominee / work | Award | Result | Ref. |
|---|---|---|---|---|
| 2009 | Beethoven: The Complete String Quartets | Best Classical Album | Nominated | |
