= David Bollard =

New Zealand-born Australian classical pianist and teacher

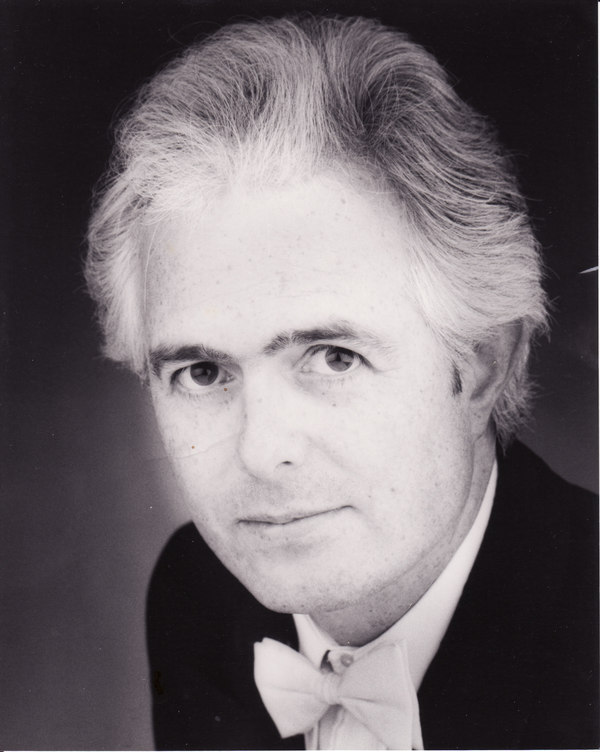
- Born: 1942 (age 83–84); Wellington, New Zealand
- Occupations: Classical pianist and academic teacher

David Bollard (born 1942) is an Australian classical pianist and teacher.

== Career ==
David Bollard studied with Béla Síki in 1962, then moved to London in 1964, studying with Ilona Kabos, Louis Kentner and Julius Katchen. After a successful Wigmore Hall debut, BBC broadcasts and concerts in Europe, he moved to Australia in 1970. He was a founding member of the Australia Ensemble, resident at the University of New South Wales, and performed and recorded with them for 19 years (1980–1998). He also toured with visiting artists such as violinists Wanda Wiłkomirska, Edith Peinemann and Dylana Jenson, and singers Rotraud Hansmann, Robert Gard and Beverley Bergen.

From 2000 to 2006, he toured and recorded as a member of Ménage à Trois (with soprano Jane Edwards and tenor David Hamilton), and as a member of the Esperance Trio, resident at the University of Tasmania (with Rachel Bremner and Christian Wojtowicz).

== Teaching ==
David Bollard was in 1970 a staff member at the Sydney Conservatorium of Music, and from 1970 to 1979 was an Artist-in-Residence at the University of Western Australia, where he collaborated with musicians like Alfredo Campoli, André Tchaikowsky, Jane Manning, Rohan de Saram and the Alberni String Quartet. He was Head of Keyboard Studies at Monash University in 2002, and in 2006 became adjunct professor at the University of Tasmania.

== Discography ==
His recordings are mostly on the ABC Classics, Festival, Vox Australis, Entracte, Tall Poppies and Move labels. They include:

- Peter Sculthorpe, Landscape for piano and pre-recorded tape, on Festival Records, recorded 1971 (LP)
- Nigel Butterley, Letter from Hardy's Bay for prepared piano, on Festival Records, recorded 1971 (LP)
- Alfred Hill, Piano Concerto, with the West Australian Symphony Orchestra cond. Georg Tintner, on Festival Records, recorded 1972 (LP)
- Luigi Dallapiccola, including Liriche Greche, Divertimento in Quattro Esercizi and Piccola Musica Notturna, with the Australia Ensemble, on Entracte, 1988
- Cafe Concertino, including Cafe Concertino (Carl Vine), White Night and Beaver (Martin Wesley-Smith), Refractions (Nigel Westlake), Manutaki (Gillian Whitehead) and So it Does (Mark Isaacs), with the Australia Ensemble, on Tall Poppies, 1989
- Peter and the Wolf (Prokofiev) and Carnival of the Animals (Saint-Saëns), with the Sydney Symphony Orchestra cond. Stuart Challender, ABC Records, 1989
- Music of the Second Viennese School, including String Trio Op.45 (Schoenberg), Chamber Concerto, Adagio (Berg) and Chamber Symphony Op.9 (Schoenberg arr Webern), with the Australia Ensemble, on Entracte, 1989
- Schubert String Quintet D.956 and Der Hirt auf dem Felsen D.965, with the Australia Ensemble, on Tall Poppies, 1991
- Evocations: The Poet, twelve pieces for cello and piano, with David Pereira vlc, on Tall Poppies, 1991
- Richard Meale, including Incredible Floridas and String Quartet No.2, with the Australia Ensemble, on Tall Poppies, 1991
- Shostakovich, including Piano Quintet Op.57 and Piano Trio Op.67, with the Australia Ensemble, on Tall Poppies, 1992-3
- Samsara, Trio No. 6 by Larry Sitsky, pieces by Gordon Kerry, Don Banks, Bozidar Kos and Carl Vine, with the Australia Ensemble, on Tall Poppies, 1993
- Souvenir, fourteen pieces for violin and piano, with Graham Wood vln, on Tall Poppies, 1993
- Cello Rhapsody, pieces by Schumann, Brahms, Shostakovic, Falla, Nin and Ginastera, with David Pereira vlc, on Tall Poppies, 1994
- Music of Don Kay, with Fiona Perrin fl, Michael Kieran Harvey pno and Christian Wojtowitz vlc, on Move Records, 2010

== Writings ==
An editorial collaboration with Philippa Paige for Currency Press earned a Sounds Australian award for best publication of the year. He writes regular reviews and articles for Music Forum magazine and other publications in Australia and overseas.
