= Irina Morozova =

Irina Morozova may refer to:

- Irina Morozova, a violist with the Goldner String Quartet and the Australia Ensemble, married to Dene Olding
- Irina Morozova (character), a character from the American science fiction web television series For All Mankind
