= Geoffrey Payne =

Geoffrey Payne (born c. 1957) is a noted Australian classical trumpeter. He has been Principal Trumpet with the Melbourne Symphony Orchestra since 1986, and has been a member of the orchestra since 1979. He also performs with other orchestras both in Australia and internationally, and has made a number of recordings.

== Biography ==
Geoffrey Payne grew up in Sydney. His father played tuba in a brass band, and his own first foray into music was playing the cornet in his father's band, after which he joined the Willoughby Band. When he was 12 he won a scholarship to the Sydney Conservatorium of Music.

Payne joined the ABC Training Orchestra in 1976, the Sydney Symphony Orchestra (SSO) as third trumpet the same year, and in 1979 the Melbourne Symphony Orchestra (MSO). He has been Principal Trumpet with the MSO since 1986.

He won a major prize in the ABC Instrumental and Vocal Competition (now known as the ABC Symphony Australia Young Performers Awards) in 1983, and in 1984 won First Prize in the 22nd International Trumpet Competition in Budapest, Hungary.

He has performed with all Australian state symphony orchestras and the Australian Chamber Orchestra. He has also toured for Musica Viva Australia. Overseas groups he has played with include Hiroyuki Iwaki's Orchestra Ensemble Kanazawa in Japan, and the International Trumpet Guild in Michigan and the San Diego Symphony (Guest Principal Trumpet) in the United States.

He has played with jazz musicians such as James Morrison, when they performed David Stanhope's Battle Concerto, a double concerto for classical and jazz trumpets, with the SSO in 2010.

He has made a number of recordings, featuring concertos by Alexander Arutiunian, Vincenzo Bellini, Domenico Cimarosa, Joseph Haydn, Johann Nepomuk Hummel, William Lovelock, Richard Mills, Henri Tomasi and Carl Maria von Weber, with the MSO conducted by John Hopkins and Michael Halász. Another disc is of pieces arranged by Rafael Méndez.

His wife Julie is second trumpet in the MSO and his sister and brother-in-law teach music in Guernsey.
