= Nelson Cooke =

Australian cellist (1919–2018)

Nelson Cooke AM
- Born: Nelson Ripley Cooke; 21 December 1919; Bellbird, New South Wales, Australia
- Died: 7 February 2018 (aged 98)
- Occupations: Principal cellist, London Symphony Orchestra and Royal Philharmonic Orchestra
- Instrument: Cello
- Years active: 1950s – c. 2009

Nelson Ripley Cooke AM (21 December 1919 – 7 February 2018) was an Australian cellist who was principal cellist at the London Symphony Orchestra and Royal Philharmonic Orchestras during the 1950s and 1960s.

== Career ==
Cooke was born in Bellbird, New South Wales, Australia. He began playing the cello aged 8, having previously been a piano player. At one time, he was taught by Jascha Gopinko.

During the Second World War, Cooke served in the Australian Defence Force, during which time he visited Papua New Guinea and the Solomon Islands. In 1949, Cooke travelled to the UK to be taught by Pablo Casals. Cooke was a principal cellist in the London Symphony Orchestra in the 1950s, making him the first Australian cellist at the orchestra. In the 1960s, he became principal cellist with the Royal Philharmonic Orchestra. In 1968, Cooke began teaching at the University of South Florida. In 1970, he became principal cellist for the Florida Orchestra. He later became head of strings at the Canberra School of Music, and in the 1990s, he worked as a music teacher at the University of Melbourne.

In 1988, Cooke founded the Riverina Summer School for Strings. Cooke retired from playing the cello at the age of 90. In 2011, Cooke was appointed a Member of the Order of Australia (AM) in the New Years Honours List.
