= Ernest Llewellyn =

Australian musician

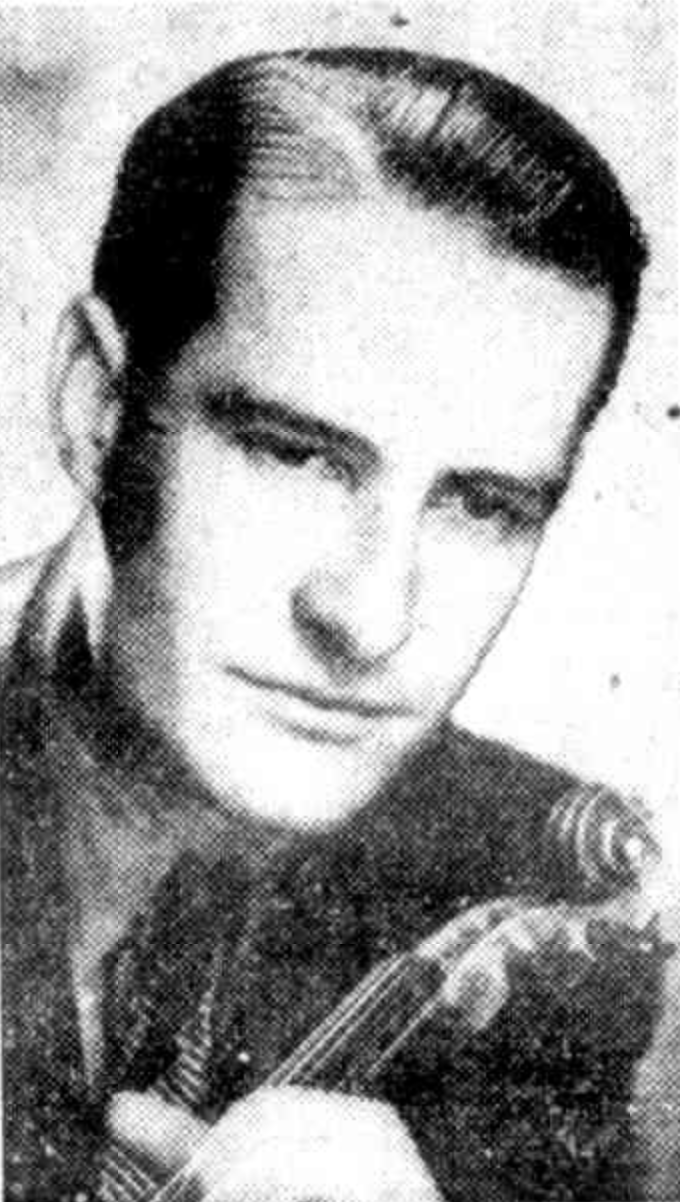
Ernest Llewellyn in 1949

Ernest Victor Llewellyn CBE (21 June 1915 – 12 July 1982) was an Australian violinist, concertmaster, violist, conductor and musical administrator. He was the founding director of the Canberra School of Music and is commemorated by Llewellyn Hall, the concert venue at the School.

== Early career ==
Ernest Llewellyn was born in Kurri Kurri, New South Wales in 1915. He was educated at Kurri Kurri State School, Maitland High School, and, for six months, at the NSW Conservatorium of Music in Sydney. In 1933 the 17-year-old Llewellyn gave a 'grand farewell violin recital' at the West Maitland Town Hall. It was later decided that the money raised by the concert and by public appeal should be given to those suffering in the Great Depression. In 1934 he commenced studies with Jascha Gopinko.

From 1934 to 1937 he was the violist in the Sydney String Quartet and the leader of the viola section of the ABC Sydney Orchestra. In 1936 he appeared as a solo violinist under the baton of Sir Malcolm Sargent. He was offered the position of deputy leader of the Scottish Orchestra, but turned it down.

That year he married Ruth Smith, daughter of the violin and viola maker A.E. Smith, whose wedding gift was a violin of his own making. In 1940 he moved to Melbourne to become Deputy Leader of the Melbourne Symphony Orchestra. He also taught at the University of Melbourne, and was the leader of the Melbourne University String Quartet. He served his country between 1942 and 1944 in the Royal Australian Air Force.

From 1944 to 1948 he was leader of the Queensland State String Quartet (QSSQ), taking them on a tour of New Zealand in 1948 at the invitation of the Wellington Chamber Music Society. Reviews of the tour led to the establishment of the New Zealand Federation of Chamber Music Clubs.

In 1947, Isaac Stern visited Australia for the first time. He attended a performance by the QSSQ and was impressed by the tonal qualities of the violin being played by Llewellyn. Stern went backstage to meet Llewellyn and learned about A.E. Smith for the first time. The next morning they swapped instruments and played together; the two became lifelong friends.

In 1949 Ernest Llewellyn and Hephzibah Menuhin (then married to an Australian and living in western Victoria) presented the complete violin sonatas of Beethoven in a series of recitals in the eastern states of Australia.

== Sydney Symphony Orchestra ==
Llewellyn was appointed Concertmaster of the Sydney Symphony Orchestra in 1949, and Assistant Conductor in 1959. From 1949 to 1955 he was the leader of the ABC String Quartet. In 1952 he again toured New Zealand, this time as part of the Llewellyn-Kennedy Piano Trio (with John Kennedy, cello, and Scylla Kennedy, piano; they were the parents of Nigel Kennedy, although they never married).

When Isaac Stern toured Australia again in 1954, he and Llewellyn played Bach's Double Concerto with the Sydney Symphony Orchestra. The pianist William Kapell had recently been killed in a plane crash while returning from his Australian tour, and Stern set up the William Kapell Memorial Fund to bring notable musicians to the US for wider experience. Stern gave a concert in Sydney in July 1954 for the William Kapell Memorial Fund, and ensured that Ernest Llewellyn was the inaugural recipient. At the same time he was awarded a Fulbright grant to study teaching methods in the US, the UK and Europe for 15 months. He spent most of his time studying with Isaac Stern at the Juilliard School in New York.

In the 1950s Ernest Llewellyn inaugurated and directed music camps and festivals for the National Music Camp Association and for Musica Viva Australia at Mittagong. He also directed workshops through Musica Viva and the Musica Viva Younger Group.

== Canberra School of Music ==
Llewellyn resigned from the Sydney Symphony Orchestra in 1964 to devote his time to full-time teaching. He intended to teach privately in Wollongong, Goulburn, Mittagong and Canberra, and to establish regional orchestras. A year later, in September 1965, at the invitation of the Department of the Interior, he became founding director of the Canberra School of Music, immediately appointing some of the finest performers in the country to the staff, including Larry Sitsky (keyboard), Vincent Edwards (strings) and Murray Khouri (woodwind). During his time as Director he continued to perform, taking part in many of the School's faculty concerts, leading the Canberra String Quartet, and in 1966 becoming musical director and conductor of the Canberra Symphony Orchestra, a semi-professional full symphony orchestra that was formed out of the amateur Canberra Orchestral Society by joining its forces with staff and students from the School of Music. Between 1969 and 1979, the Canberra Symphony's annual program under Llewellyn featured masterworks of the choral repertoire (including Orff's Carmina Burana, Elgar's The Dream of Gerontius, Beethoven's Choral Symphony and the Verdi Requiem) performed with a combined choir known as the Singers of Canberra, made up of the leading choral organisations in the city: the Canberra Choral Society, ANU Choral Society, Canberra Philharmonic and Canberra Society of Singers.

The Canberra School of Music operated until 1976 in temporary premises that were previously the Manuka Mothercraft Centre. In 1976 he was given approval to proceed with his plans for a permanent School of Music in Canberra. He based his conception of the School as a centre of excellence on the Juilliard School, and he regarded Isaac Stern as the "father" of the school. He envisioned one that would not only be a centre of creativity and performance but also be the home of a world-class concert venue. Stern inspected the school in its early stages while on his last concert tour of Australia in the early 1970s. Llewellyn had insisted from the outset that the building should be located on a site that was both central to the Australian National University and the city centre, easily accessible for both students and patrons. Together with the Melbourne architect Daryl Jackson, Llewellyn produced a final plan that was architecturally innovative and original, and which ensured that the building would continue to be recognised historically as a unique piece of architecture. The concert hall has indeed become world-class, and was named Llewellyn Hall in 1980 on his retirement as Director of the School of Music.

Llewellyn was invited to attend the fifth International Tchaikovsky Competition in Moscow as an 'honoured guest' in 1974, and in 1978 he became the first Australian to serve on a jury in the Tchaikovsky competition. In 1979 and 1980 he visited China to advise on teaching methods. The 1979 visit was at the invitation of the String Department of the Shanghai Conservatory of Music to advise on teaching methods and give master classes in Beijing and Shanghai. The second visit was arranged under the Cultural Relations program.

== Retirement ==
Llewellyn retired as Director of the Canberra School of Music and as conductor of the Canberra Symphony Orchestra in 1980. In 1981-82 he established the Wollongong Branch of the Sydney Conservatorium of Music, & taught at the Sydney Conservatorium for the students of Dorel Tincu who had passed in March 1981. Plans were in hand for a third visit to China and an exchange visit to Ottawa to conduct the Ottawa Symphony Orchestra and to advise on the establishment of a Conservatorium there, but he died on 12 July 1982 of a brain tumour, in Sydney. He is survived by his wife Ruth Llewellyn and his sons Dafydd and Richard.

Later that month the retiring Governor-General Sir Zelman Cowen announced that the proceeds of his farewell concert would be devoted to the Ernest Llewellyn Memorial Scholarship, to help young musicians and the advancement of string playing in Australia. In 1985, Isaac Stern made a special trip to Australia to give a benefit concert at the Sydney Opera House in tribute to Llewellyn, with the proceeds (nearly $80,000) going to the Llewellyn Scholarship. This put the scholarship on a firm financial footing, and the first awards were made in 1987.

Llewellyn was a member of the Board of Governors of the Frensham School in Mittagong. He was involved with the ABC for much of his working life, leading the ABC String Quartet (1949–52), appearing as soloist or concertmaster in many ABC concerts and broadcasts, conducting the ABC School Orchestral concerts, as an adjudicator for the ABC Concerto and Vocal Competitions and as a member of the Canberra Advisory Committee of the ABC.

== Honours and commemorations ==
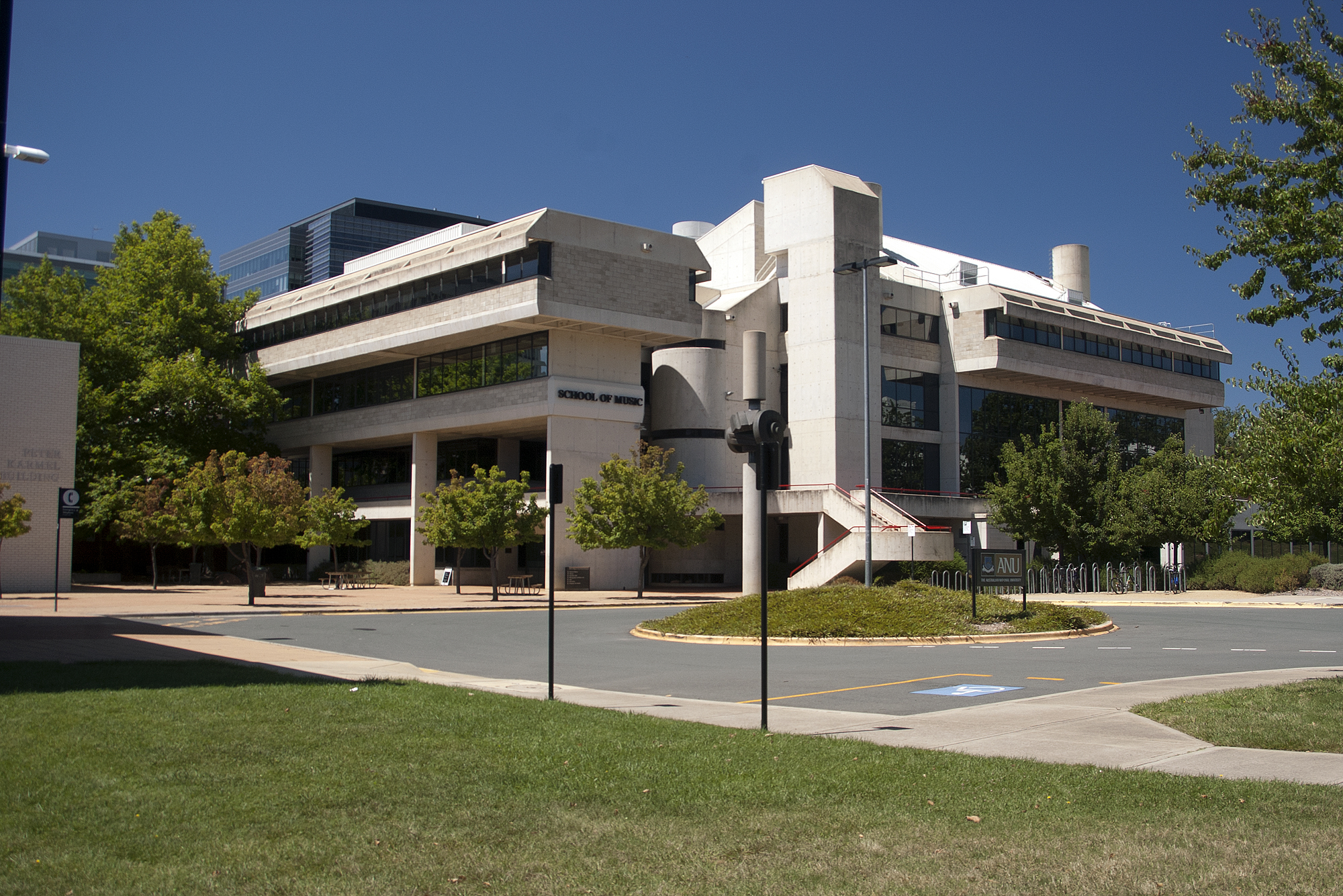
Llewellyn Hall

Llewellyn was appointed a Member of the Order of the British Empire (MBE) in 1968 for services to music as Director of the Canberra School of Music. In 1970 he was raised to Commander level (CBE) within the same order.

Llewellyn is commemorated in:

- the Ernest Llewellyn Memorial Scholarship,
- the Llewellyn Hall at the Canberra School of Music, and
- the Llewellyn Choir in Canberra.

Ernest Llewellyn was inducted into the Cessnock Hall of Fame on 6 December 2006.
