= Dene Olding =

Australian violinist (born 1956)

Dene Maxwell Olding AM (born 11 October 1956) is an Australian violinist. He has had a distinguished career as a soloist in Australia, New Zealand and the United States, performing over forty concertos in recent years, including many world premieres. He is the Concertmaster Emeritus of the Sydney Symphony Orchestra, first violinist in the Goldner String Quartet, and a member of the Australia Ensemble.

== Biography ==
Dene Olding is the son of the husband and wife piano duo Max Olding and Pamela Page. He was initially educated at the Anglican Church Grammar School in Brisbane, but left at age 15—two years before he was due to graduate—to attend the Juilliard School in New York as a scholarship student of Ivan Galamian and Margaret Pardee. He graduated from Juilliard in 1978. He attended master classes with Nathan Milstein and had further lessons with Herman Krebbers and György Pauk.

He joined the Australia Ensemble in 1982, and was also at that time leader of the Australian Chamber Orchestra. In 1985, he was awarded a Churchill Fellowship to further his musical studies. During that year, he won a Bronze medal at the Queen Elisabeth Music Competition in Belgium.

He was concertmaster of the Sydney Symphony Orchestra from 1987 to 1994, and again from 2002 to 2016. On his retirement he was appointed Concertmaster Emeritus of the orchestra. He is also a frequent guest concertmaster of the Melbourne Symphony Orchestra.

Dene Olding is regularly heard as soloist with all the major Australian orchestras and has worked with conductors such as Edo de Waart, Stanisław Skrowaczewski, Stuart Challender, Sir Charles Mackerras, Jorge Mester, Günther Herbig, Werner Andreas Albert and David Porcelijn.

He gave the Australian premieres of Witold Lutosławski's Chain 2 with the composer conducting, and the violin concertos by Elliott Carter and Philip Glass. In addition, he has performed world premieres of violin concertos by Ross Edwards (Maninyas, a work dedicated to Dene Olding) and Božidar Kos, and the Double Concerto for violin and viola by Richard Mills, written for himself and his wife, Irina Morozova.

He has made many recordings, including one of sonatas by Brahms, Beethoven and Mozart, with his father Max Olding. His recording of Ross Edwards' Maninyas won the 1994 ARIA Award for Best Classical Recording, and the Cannes award. He made the first CD recording of concertos by Frank Martin, Darius Milhaud and Samuel Barber. He has recorded the violin concerti of Paul Hindemith with the Queensland Symphony Orchestra under Werner Andreas Albert.

He was the Artistic Advisor and Chair of the Jury of the 2018 ABC Young Performers Award, held at the Sydney Opera House with the Sydney Symphony Orchestra.

He plays a Joseph Guarnerius violin made in 1720. In the Edwards, Martin, Milhaud and Barber recordings, he used the A. E. Smith violin he inherited from a previous Sydney Symphony concertmaster, Ernest Llewellyn.

He has conducted the Sydney Symphony and Auckland Philharmonia Orchestra.

== Personal life ==
Olding is married to Irina Morozova, a violist with the Goldner String Quartet and the Australia Ensemble. Together they have a son, Nicolai.

Olding is a practitioner of Aikido.

== Awards and nominations ==
=== ARIA Music Awards ===
The ARIA Music Awards is an annual awards ceremony that recognises excellence, innovation, and achievement across all genres of Australian music. They commenced in 1987.

Year	Nominee / work	Award	Result	Ref.
1994	Ross Edwards Orchestral Works (with Sydney Symphony Orchestra, Stuart Challender & David Porcelijn)	Best Classical Album	Won	
1994	Violin Concertos (with Melbourne Symphony Orchestra & Hiroyuki Iwaki)	Best Classical Album	Nominated	

== Sources ==
- Australia Ensemble
- Sydney Symphony concertmasters
