= Ian Munro (pianist) =

Australian pianist and composer (b.1963)

Ian Munro (born 1963) is an Australian pianist, composer, and music educator. His career has taken him to many countries in Europe, Asia, North America, and Australasia.

== Early life and education ==
Ian Munro attended Scotch College in Melbourne for his high school education.

He then attended the Victorian College of the Arts (1981–83). His early piano training was in Melbourne with Rodney Hurst, Marta Rostas (a pupil of Béla Bartók), Deirdre Vadas and Roy Shepherd (a pupil of Alfred Cortot) and he had further study in Vienna, London and Italy with Franz Zettl, Noretta Conci, Guido Agosti, and Michele Campanella.

== Career ==
=== Pianist ===
Munro's solo repertoire includes both rare and unusual works of the 19th and 20th centuries (such as those by his compatriots Katharine Parker, Ernest Hutcheson and Arthur Benjamin) and he also has a special interest in new music. He has premiered or commissioned works by Peter Sculthorpe, Elena Kats-Chernin (her second piano concerto), Roger Smalley, John Woolrich, Andrew Ford (The Waltz Book, a series of 60 waltzes lasting one minute each), Gordon Kerry, Ann Ghandar, Raffaele Marcellino, Ross Edwards and Dmitri Yanov-Yanovsky, from whom he commissioned the piano cycle Silhouettes. These pieces were dedicated to significant 20th-century composers such as Debussy, Gershwin, Ives, Ravel, Schnittke, Stravinsky – and John Cage, which in true Cage style consisted of 33 seconds of silence.

During his time in Hobart he created and played a series of four recitals, "One Hundred Nineteens", in 1999, comprising one work from each year of the 20th century.

In 2003, he performed a piano recital to an audience representing a wide range of Sydney's music community, commemorating the 150th anniversary of the Bechstein presence in Australia.

He has over 40 piano concerti in his repertoire, which includes the standard repertoire as well as such pieces as Hans Werner Henze's epic concerto Requiem. He has performed with all the major orchestras in Australia, as well as orchestras in New Zealand, the Czech Republic, Poland, Italy, Portugal, Russia, the USA, and China, and in the UK (the Royal Philharmonic Orchestra, Philharmonia, English Chamber Orchestra, London Mozart Players, BBC Concert Orchestra, BBC Scottish Symphony Orchestra). He has broadcast widely for the BBC. Munro has accompanied singers such as Gerald English and Yvonne Kenny. In chamber music he has appeared alongside artists such as Leslie Howard, David Pereira, Ruggiero Ricci, Erich Gruenberg, Daniil Shafran, Oleh Krysa, Krszysztof Smietana, Karina Georgian, Jane Manning, the Australia Ensemble, the Medici, Belcea and Goldner String Quartets, the Berlin Philharmonic Wind Quintet, and the Melbourne Chamber Orchestra.

Munro has a special interest in the music of Arthur Benjamin as a result of meeting Benjamin's pupil Joan Trimble in 1990, and has recorded many of his little-known piano pieces. For his Benjamin recordings, he has also written a short biography of the composer, filling a serious gap in the literature. His other writings include a biography of Katharine Parker.

Munro has recorded a wide range of music for ABC Classics, Hyperion, Cala, Naxos (including Marco Polo), Tall Poppies and Alto. His recordings include his own realisations of some unfinished piano pieces by Franz Schubert; and Russell Gilmour's Keating Tangos and Whitlam Rags projects. Other composers represented in his recordings include Albéniz, Arensky, Don Banks, Beethoven, Lennox Berkeley, Brahms, Nigel Butterley, Chopin, Ross Edwards, César Franck, Gershwin, Peggy Glanville-Hicks, Stephen Heller, Keith Humble, Adolf Jensen, Gordon Kerry, Liszt, Litolff, David Lumsdaine, Martinů, Mendelssohn, Mozart, Jean Louis Nicodé, Henryk Pachulski, Katharine Parker, Vincent Plush, Saint-Saëns, Peter Sculthorpe, Roger Smalley, Zygmunt Stojowski, Carl Vine, Martin Wesley-Smith, and Malcolm Williamson.

=== Composer ===
Munro is the first Australian to win the Grand Prix at the Queen Elisabeth Music Competition for composers in Belgium (2003), with his piano concerto Dreams, which then became a set piece for the twelve finalists in the piano section of that year's competition. The work was broadcast across Europe on radio and television, and was performed in Russia.

Munro has an interest in music for children, as reflected in the Children's Concerto (1999) and Lucy's Book (1993–2006). Other works include Drought and Night Rain (2005), O Traurigkeit (2006), and Blue Rags (2005), which was nominated for the APRA Orchestral Work of the Year 2006 and has been recorded for ABC Classics. There is also a piano quintet called Divertissement sur le nom d'Erik Satie (2006), telling the story of a day in the life of Erik Satie. A piano trio, Tales from Old Russia was written in 2008. As well as commissioning rags from other composers, Ian Munro has written his own rags, such as Bad Girl Rag, dedicated to William Bolcom.

In 2011 he was Musica Viva's composer-in-residence.

=== Teacher ===
Ian Munro headed the piano department at the Tasmanian Conservatorium of Music between 1995 and 1999, then joined the staff at the University of New South Wales and at the Australian National Academy of Music. He has taught masterclasses in Australia, Japan, Hong Kong, Vietnam, Thailand and for eleven consecutive years at the Dartington International Summer Festival in the UK.

== Other roles ==
=== Director and memberships ===
He has been a director of Musica Viva and a member of the Artistic Committee of Chamber Music Australia.

=== Juror ===
He has been a juror on various competitions, including:

- the 2003 Clara Haskil International Piano Competition
- the 2003 Melbourne International Chamber Music Competition
- the 2004 Symphony Australia Young Performer of the Year Awards,
- the 2008 New Zealand Kerikeri National Piano Competition,
- the 2008 Sydney International Piano Competition.

== Awards and nominations ==
- 1982: Winner, ABC Instrumental and Vocal Competition (now the ABC Symphony Australia Young Performers Awards)
- 1985: Maria Canals International Music Competition – major prize (piano)
- 1987: Leeds International Piano Competition – major prize (piano)
- 1987: Vianna da Motta International Music Competition – major prize (piano)
- 1987: Ferruccio Busoni International Piano Competition in Italy – major prize (piano)
- 2003: Grand Prix at the Queen Elisabeth Music Competition for composers, Belgium
- 2006 Blue Rags (2005) nominated for the APRA Orchestral Work of the Year
- 2008: Outstanding Contribution by an Individual APRA Award win for "contribution to Australian performance and composition in 2007", presented by Australasian Performing Right Association and Australian Music Centre

== Personal ==
In 2011 Munro was living in Newcastle, New South Wales with his wife Helen English, a musicologist, and their children.
