= Eilene Hannan =

Australian opera singer (1946–2014)

Eilene Hannan AM (24 July 1946 – 11 July 2014) was an Australian operatic soprano with an international reputation. She was particularly associated with opera sung in English, although she also sang in other languages. She was as well known as an actress as she was a singer. Her repertoire included Mozart's Pamina, Susanna, Cherubino, Dorabella and Zerlina; Mimì in Puccini's La bohème; Natasha Rostova in Prokofiev's War and Peace; Tatiana in Tchaikovsky's Eugene Onegin; Marzelline in Beethoven's Fidelio; Mélisande in Debussy's Pelléas et Mélisande; Blanche in Poulenc's Dialogues of the Carmelites; the title roles in Janáček's Káťa Kabanová, Jenůfa and The Cunning Little Vixen; the Marschallin in Richard Strauss's Der Rosenkavalier; Princess Eboli in Verdi's Don Carlos; Pat Nixon in Adams' Nixon in China; Wagner's Sieglinde and Venus; Salome in Massenet's Hérodiade; and Monteverdi's Poppea.

== Career ==
Eilene Hannan was born in Melbourne, the daughter of lawyers, George Hannan and his wife Eileen née Williams. Her father later became a Senator for Victoria. She attended Sacré Cœur School, Glen Iris. At school she took music only to escape geography, which she hated, but her real interest was to make a difference in other people's lives in roles such as social worker or counsellor. She was discouraged from pursuing these careers due to her passionate nature and innate musical gifts. Her serious singing studies started only when she was 15.

She joined the Australian Opera in 1971 appearing first as Barbarina in Mozart's The Marriage of Figaro and Gilbert and Sullivan. In 1973 she created the role of Natasha Rostova in the Australian premiere of Sergei Prokofiev's opera War and Peace, the opera chosen as the inaugural production at the Sydney Opera House. Conductors and directors under whom she worked at the Australian Opera included Sir Edward Downes, Sir Mark Elder, Carlo Felice Cillario, Richard Bonynge, Sir John Pritchard, Sam Wanamaker, John Copley and Sir Jonathan Miller.

Hannan moved to London in 1977, and sang Salome in Massenet's Hérodiade at that year's Wexford Festival in Ireland. Her British debut was at the Glyndebourne Festival in the title role of Janáček’s The Cunning Little Vixen. Under Sir Mark Elder and the English National Opera, which she joined in 1978, she sang Lauretta in Kurt Weill's The Seven Deadly Sins, Pamina in The Magic Flute, where her bell-like purity of tone and her intelligent phrasing came in for special critical approval, and Mimi in Puccini's La bohème, which also attracted superlative reviews. With ENO, Eilene Hannan recorded the female title role in an English-language production of Debussy's Pelléas et Mélisande in 1981 (available on DVD). She also sang Natasha in London, and also at the Metropolitan Opera, New York during ENO's 1984 tour. Another triumph was the 1986 production of Dvořák's Rusalka under director David Pountney (available on DVD).

She made her Royal Opera, Covent Garden debut in 1987, as Nice Caroline in Aulis Sallinen's The King Goes Forth to France. In 1988 with her then husband, the pianist Phillip Thomas, she gave a series of performances of Poulenc's La voix humaine. She returned to Australia in the late 1980s, and worked in Neil Armfield productions, most notably as the Governess in Britten's The Turn of the Screw (for which she won a Green Room Award) and in the title role of Janáček's Káťa Kabanová.

She regularly sang with Victoria State Opera including La Boheme (Mimi) 1985 conducted by Richard Divall and Brian Stacey, Directed by John Copley; and Tannhaüser (Venus) 1989 conducted by Richard Divall, directed by Richard Cottrell both productions at the then relatively new State Theatre, Victorian Arts Centre. In 1996 she created the role of Emma in Richard Mills' opera Summer of the Seventeenth Doll with Victoria State Opera.

Her work continued both at home and internationally, singing under conductors such as Sir Charles Mackerras, Sir Simon Rattle and Pierre Boulez. In 1989 she sang Hero in Berlioz's Béatrice et Bénédict with Opera North.

Growing dissatisfied with the life of a singer, she trained and worked as a counsellor, an interest she had long held, but she later rediscovered her passion for singing and carried on a dual career. In the 1990s she toured Australia as the Mother Abbess in The Sound of Music.

In the Queen's Birthday Honours of 1994, she was appointed a Member of the Order of Australia for her services to opera.

In the later part of her working life Hannan was a noted English and French language dialect coach, and conducted master classes for the Dame Nellie Melba Opera Trust.

After the deaths of her parents, whom she nursed in their dying years, she returned to London to work as a mentor to younger singers at Covent Garden. Soon after, she was diagnosed with inoperable cervical cancer and died in London on 11 July 2014, aged 67. A public memorial service was held at the Melbourne Recital Centre on 10 August.

== Family and personal life ==
Her father George Hannan was a member of the Australian Senate for Victoria 1956-65 and again 1970-74, mostly representing the Liberal Party but in his final years as an independent.

Her elder sister Judith married Guy Boileau, later Sir Guy Boileau, 8th Baronet. Lady Boileau died on 9 August 2014, less than a month after Eilene. She also had two older brothers, Peter and Michael.

Eilene Hannan was the partner of the cellist Nathan Waks for a period in the 1970s. In England in 1980 she married Phillip Thomas, a Welsh pianist with ENO. They later divorced.
