= Christopher Sainsbury =

Australian Indigenous composer

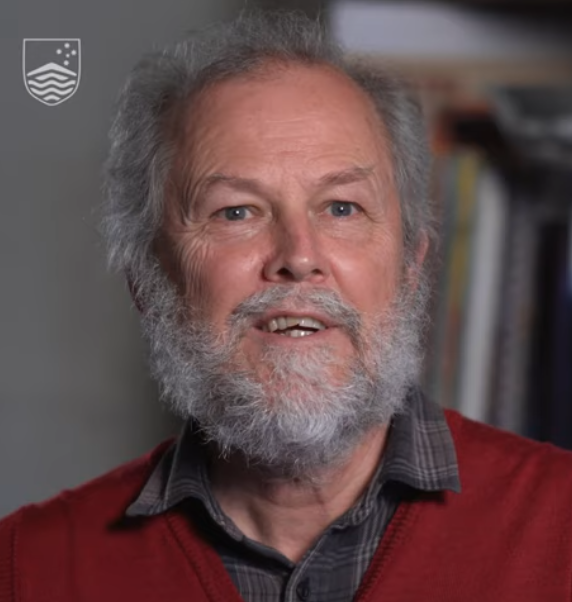
- In an ANU video in 2022
- Born: 1963 (age 62–63); Central Coast, New South Wales, Australia
- Education: Northern Rivers College of Advanced Education
- Occupations: Composer, performer, music teacher
- Awards: APRA Award (2020)

Christopher Sainsbury (born 1963) is a composer, performer and teacher of music. As of 2022 he is an associate professor at the ANU School of Music, Canberra, where he lectures in composition, songwriting, and contemporary Australian Indigenous music. He is descended from the Dharug Aboriginal people, and is the founder and artistic director of the Ngarra-Burria: First Peoples Composers program.

== Early life and education ==
Sainsbury was born on the Central Coast, New South Wales in 1963. In his early years, Sainsbury was involved in various regional and community musical groups during the 1960s and 1970s which have become important influences in his work.

In 1984, Sainsbury studied composition under Australian conductor and composer Richard Mills.

Sainsbury attended the Northern Rivers College of Advanced Education (now the Southern Cross University) where he was awarded the College Medal in 1986. He began teaching music at the Eora College in 1990 where he was the Head of Arts and Media until 2015. Since then, Sainsbury has been teaching at the ANU School of Music.

== Career ==
Sainsbury has made significant contributions to elevating Australian First Nations voices and representation in music. He also writes about Indigenous representation and misappropriation in the cultural arena.

The most significant of his contributions is the establishment of Ngarra-Burria: First Peoples Composers (initially known as the Indigenous Composer Initiative) in 2016.

He has provided mentorship to the Indigenous composer and hip hop musician known as DOBBY.

As of 2022 he is Associate Professor in Composition, Songwriting, Australian Indigenous Music (Contemporary), Australian Music Studies, and Artistic Director Ngarra-burria First Peoples Composers Program at ANU.

Sainsbury is the composer for opera, The Visitors, a First Nation's perspective centered on telling the story of the eve of colonisation in Australia, premiering world wide in October 2023 via Victorian Opera.

== Music ==
Sainsbury writes music for many different ensembles and in varying styles. He describes himself as "a regionalist composer" as a way to acknowledge his regional upbringing as his most important influence on his music. He cites composers as varied as James Penberthy, Steve Swallow and Hans Werner Henze as influences in his music, as well as genres including jazz and surf music. He has written for many different instrumentations ranging from solo to orchestral pieces, some of which has been described as "orchestral surf music."

== Recognition ==
In 2020, he was awarded the APRA Art Music Inaugural National Luminary Award in recognition of his work with Ngarra-Burria; an award he says is also "a recognition that the program is built on the back of my 35 years work as a composer and 30 years work in Indigenous music education".
