= A. E. Smith (violin maker) =

Australian violin maker

Arthur Edward Smith MBE (1880 – 16 May 1978), known as A. E. Smith, was an English-born Australian violin and viola maker whose violins and violas are prized for their 'excellence of tone' and 'decorative elements' (e.g. sound holes, scrolls and curves). According to some musicians, "it is his violas that have the greatest reputation, being easily counted amongst the greatest ever created, regardless of era or nationality."

== Birth and early years ==
It is believed that Smith was born 1880, at Islington, London. He began his violin-making hobby to improve upon an inferior instrument which he had played in the Maldon Amateur Orchestral Society. Luthiering subsequently overtook engineering as his primary interest. Smith was self-taught, guided by A. E. Hill's book on Antonio Stradivari. His rapid acquisition of expertise attracted the attention of the Maldon antique and musical instrument dealer C. W. Jeffreys, whose firm he joined in 1905 as repairer and violin-maker.

== Migration to Australia ==
By 1909, Smith had made twenty violins and a quartet, with his instruments having already become noted for their excellent outline, arching and scrolls. He migrated to Melbourne in an attempt to set up on his own in an environment with fewer established competitors. In 1912–14 he worked with the Hungarian Carl Rothhammer at San Francisco, then moving to Sydney where he briefly continued his partnership with Rothhammer.

In 1919, he established A. E. Smith & Co. Ltd, an importer and repairer – as well as a manufacturer, of stringed instruments. Smith personally trained his craftsmen in the production of violins, violas and cellos. His workshop established the careers of many other leading Australian violin makers such as Charles Clarke, Guy Aubrey Griffin, William Dolphin, Harry Vatiliotis and his own daughter, Kitty Smith. His presence as a luthier in Australia encouraged the development of local orchestras and violin teaching, as well as foreign virtuoso violinists through giving the confidence to accept Australian concert engagements and subject their precious instruments to long sea-voyages. During World War II when German strings were unavailable, Smith, trading under the trade name 'Paganini', designed and built machines to manufacture strings and fittings locally, rather than requiring import.

Smith luthiered at his Roseville workshop, producing between one and six violins a year, and on occasion viola and cello. His total output between 1899 and 1970 was about 250 instruments, with construction details of each being recorded in a series of notebooks. He was a traditionalist, using only well-matured woods such as European maples for the ribs, scrolls and backs of the instruments, and Swiss or Italian pine for the bellies. Smith's ultimate aim was to achieve the same structural perfection as seen in Guarneri and Stradivari violins. He took a musical approach to the science of acoustics. The varnish on each individual instrument was created specifically for each instrument being finished.

In 1938, his daughter, Ruth, married Ernest Llewellyn – a violinist, violist and conductor who later became the founding director of the Canberra School of Music. Smith's wedding present to Llewellyn was a violin, which he used while concertmaster of the Sydney Symphony Orchestra 1949–64; it then passed to a later concertmaster, Dene Olding, who also used it in recordings of works such as the violin concertos of Ross Edwards, Samuel Barber, Frank Martin and Darius Milhaud.

In 1947, the American violinist Isaac Stern, who was visiting Australia for the first time, attended a performance by the Queensland State String Quartet and was "struck by the tonal qualities of the violin being played by the leader", Ernest Llewellyn. He subsequently met with Llewellyn, and learned of A. E. Smith. The following morning they swapped instruments and played together. The two would remain friends until Llewellyn's death.

== Reputation and awards ==
Smith's reputation for an even sound and tonal quality reminiscent of the Cremonese masters attracted the interest not only of leading Australian players but of the world's great violinists, violists and cellists; in addition to Isaac Stern, those who acquired and used A. E. Smith violins included Yehudi Menuhin (whose sister Hephzibah had played the Beethoven sonatas with Ernest Llewellyn), Tossy Spivakovsky, Ruggiero Ricci, David Oistrakh, Emily Sun and Zlatko Baloković .

In 1949, A. E. Smith was awarded diplomas of honour for both violin and viola at the International Exhibition of Violin Makers at The Hague and next year was the first Australian to be elected to the International Society of Violin and Bow Makers. He suffered a series of strokes from the late 1950s onwards and the workmanship on his later instruments became quite distinctive in terms of detail and chisel work. In 1971 he was appointed a Member of the Order of the British Empire (MBE) for his services to music.

== Death ==
Smith died in Canberra on 16 May 1978 aged 98, predeceased by his wife Kate (née Dènèrèaz), formerly Davidson. He was survived by a pianist son, Arthur Denereaz, and his daughters Kitty Smith and Ruth Llewellyn. Kitty succeeded her father as violin maker and manager of A. E. Smith & Co. until its closure in 1972. A grandson Roderick Smith is also a violin maker.

== Instruments ==
A quartet of A. E. Smith instruments is held by the National Museum of Australia, Canberra, and a violin at the Powerhouse Museum, Sydney. The cello of the quartet held by the National Museum of Australia can be heard played by cellist David Pereira on an audio file.

His violas are his most sought after instruments, and their rarity have led to a steady increase in monetary value. His violas favoured two models: the Brescian Model and the MacDonald Stradivarius model. The Brescian model is larger, with distinctive F-holes. The Macdonald Stradivarius model is easier to play, smaller around the bouts.

Smith's later instruments exhibit very individual and personal craftsmanship. Chisel marks which can seem crude to the untrained eye are greatly valued by other makers and collectors. His varnish is considered to be one of the finest in existence and many luthiers agree that it is very close to that of Stradivarius's.
