= Flederman =

Australian musical group

- Also known as: Flederman Ensemble
- Origin: Brisbane, Queensland, Australia
- Genres: Contemporary
- Years active: 1978–1989
- Labels: Larrikin; MBS
- Past members: Simone de Haan; Carl Vine; Graeme Leak; Geoffrey Collins; Graham Hair; Brett Kelly; Georg Pedersen; Michael Askill; David Miller; David Pereira

Flederman was an Australian contemporary music ensemble co-founded by Carl Vine and Simone de Haan in 1978. Both were teaching at Queensland Conservatorium of Music, Brisbane. It later became an ensemble with a fluctuating line-up and up to six members at a time. They released their debut album, Australian Music, in 1984. In 1988 Flederman issued their self-titled second album, which won the ARIA Award for Best Classical Album was nominated for Best Independent Release in 1989.

== History ==
Flederman were founded in 1978 at Queensland Conservatorium of Music, Brisbane as a contemporary music duo by teachers Simone de Haan on trombone and electronics and Carl Vine on piano and electronics. In March 1979 they performed, "works by Cage, Johnson, Berio and others" at Cellblock Theatre, East Sydney Technical College. By 1982 it had developed into an ensemble by adding Graeme Leak on percussion and auxiliary members Hector McDonald on horn and Daniel Mendelow on trumpet. For their North American tour, in January of the following year, de Haan, Leak and Vine were joined by Geoffrey Collins on flute.

In 1984 they issued their album, Australian Music, the five tracks were composed by Vine, Keith Humble, Martin Wesley-Smith, Robert Douglas and Graham Hair, respectively. It was issued via Larrikin Records and recorded at Recording Hall, Sydney Opera House with the line-up of Collins, Leak, Vine joined by Hair on keyboards, Brett Kelly on trombone and Georg Pedersen on cello. In 1986 the line-up of Collins, Kelly and Vine were joined by Michael Askill on percussion, David Miller on piano and David Pereira on cello. They recorded a four-track self-titled album at Broadwalk Studio, Sydney Opera House, which was issued in 1988 via MBS Records. The tracks were written by Hair, Wesley-Smith, Roger Smalley and Vine, respectively. At the ARIA Music Awards of 1989 they won Best Classical Album and were nominated for Best Independent Release.

In the nine years of its existence Flederman commissioned and premiered 89 new works for the ensemble and its subsets, largely from emerging and established Australian composers but also from several important British and American ones. Most of these commissions were supported with funds from the then Music Board of the Australia Council.

== Members ==
- Simone de Haan – trombone, electronics
- Carl Vine – piano, electronics, keyboards
- Graeme Leak – percussion
- Geoffrey Collins – flute
- Graham Hair – keyboards
- Brett Kelly – trombone
- Georg Pedersen – cello
- Michael Askill – percussion
- David Miller – piano
- David Pereira – cello

== Discography ==
=== Albums ===
Title	Album details
Australian Music	Released: 1984; Label: Larrikin Records (LRF-156); Note: Recorded at the Sydney Opera House
Flederman	Released: 1988; Label: MBS Records (MBS 14)

== Awards and nominations ==
=== ARIA Music Awards ===
The ARIA Music Awards are a set of annual ceremonies presented by Australian Recording Industry Association (ARIA), which recognise excellence, innovation, and achievement across all genres of the music of Australia. They commenced in 1987.

Year	Nominee / work	Award	Result	Ref.
1989	Flederman	Best Independent Release	Nominated	
1989	Flederman	Best Classical Album	Won	
