= Simone De Haan =

- Born: 1953 (age 72–73); Perth, Australia
- Origin: Australia
- Genre: Avant-garde
- Instrument: Trombone

Simone De Haan is an Australian trombonist.

De Haan was born in Perth, Australia in 1953. He was a co-founder of Flederman, one of Australia's leading Australian contemporary music ensembles. About Flederman, Warren Burt has written "Also of note in this period are the early activities of Flederman, a group founded by Carl Vine and trombonist, composer and improviser Simone de Haan. The early Flederman events always had a very careful mix of avant-garde and experimental performance but they evolved into a mainstream avant-garde group until their disbanding in the late '80s."

== Music ensemble ==
De Haan has also been active as a member of the Australia Contemporary Music Ensemble (directed by Keith Humble) and Pipeline (with Daryl Pratt), and Ii 1986 was the subject of an interview done for the NLA Oral History Program, by Australian musicologist James Murdoch.

== Commissioned works ==
De Haan has commissioned over 150 works by Australian composers, including Love song by Carl Vine, which Vine said was "Written after a long period in which both Simone and I had been involved in the performance of a great deal of intellectually, technically and physically demanding music, it is concerned more with the purely lyrical aspects of musical performance. While demanding considerable stamina on the part of a live trombonist, the long sustained notes throughout the work function as a "warm-up" for the player's embouchure, culminating in some of the highest notes available to a tenor trombone." Other commissions include Occasional poetry by Carl Vine, Sonata for two trombones by Lawrence Whiffin, and Red letter days by Lawrence Whiffin.

== Orchestra ==
De Haan has held principal trombone positions with the West Australian Symphony Orchestra and Sydney Elizabethan Orchestra (later the Opera Australia Orchestra). Whilst resident in Europe in 1986, he was active in the Dutch improvisation scene and a regular member of the Maarten Altena Ensemble and the contemporary chamber group Ensemble Modern in Frankfurt. De Haan has also been the foundation artistic director of several music festivals, including the Queensland Music Festival, International New Music Tasmania Festival, and Jammin...making music together, a major collaborative event on South Bank in Brisbane.

== Academic positions ==
He has held academic positions including Professor and Director of the Tasmanian Conservatorium of Music UTAS, the Queensland Conservatorium Griffith University and was Director of the ANU School of Music in 2004.

== Albums ==
De Haan's playing features in two tracks on the 1995 album Wind Song by British trombonist Eric Klay., and in October 2016 De Haan performed alongside his long-time friend, percussionist and composer Phil Treloar in celebration of Treloar's 70th birthday.
