= David Pereira =

Australian musician (born 1953)

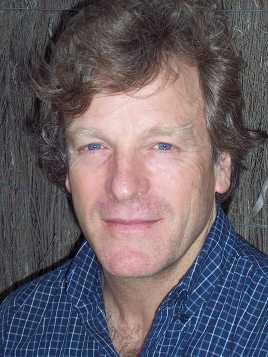
- Pereira in 2005

Background information
- Born: 21 September 1953 (age 72); Macksville, Australia
- Genres: Classical music

David Pereira (born 21 September 1953) is an Australian classical cellist. He was a Senior Lecturer in Cello at the Canberra School of Music from 1990 to 2008. Later he worked there as a Distinguished Artist in Residence since April 2017. He also teaches cello there as a Senior Lecturer.

Pereira was born in Macksville, New South Wales in 1953, moved to Young at the age of five and then to Leura. His mother, Margaret Beveridge, and his father, Keith Pereira, are Australian born. Pereira is a Portuguese name meaning - Pear-tree. He studied with John Painter at the Sydney Conservatorium of Music 1972–75 and graduated as "Student of the Year". He also studied with Fritz Magg at Indiana University and completed a master's degree in Cello Performance (1976–79).

His early work included Musica Viva Australia tours of the Outback with Richard Goldner and Charmian Gadd.

He played with the Australia Ensemble for 11 years, and was Principal Cellist of the Australian Chamber Orchestra (seven years) and of the Sydney Symphony Orchestra (three years). He has also played with Flederman, the Seymour Group, the String Soloists of the Berlin Philharmonic, Felix Ayo, the Chilingirian Quartet, Roger Woodward, Geoffrey Tozer, Ian Munro, and the Sydney String Quartet.

Pereira has performed all the cello concertos and major concertante pieces from the standard repertoire (Dvořák, Elgar, Schumann, Saint-Saëns, Johann Christian and Carl Philipp Emanuel Bach, Beethoven's Triple Concerto, Brahms's Double Concerto, Bruch's Kol Nidrei) as well as premiering concertos written for him by Australian composers such as Richard Mills, Barry Conyngham, David Lumsdaine, Larry Sitsky, Mary Finsterer and Bruce Cale. Numerous works by Australian composers for solo cello also have been written for him. He has appeared with the major orchestras in Australia and New Zealand. He has appeared in Europe, Russia and the United States with the Australian Chamber Orchestra and the Australia Ensemble, at venues such as Wigmore Hall, Queen Elizabeth Hall, the Concertgebouw, Lincoln Center and the United Nations (with Stuart Challender and Dame Joan Sutherland). There have also been appearances in China, India, the Philippines and Japan.

He has recorded the complete works for cello by Peter Sculthorpe and Einojuhani Rautavaara (with Ian Munro) and the complete solo cello suites of Johann Sebastian Bach, among a number of other recordings.

He has won many awards including twice winning the Sounds Australian Award for the Best Performance of an Australian Composition (Carl Vine's Inner World; David Lumsdaine's Garden of Earthly Delights). Apart from the new concertos mentioned above, David Pereira has premiered many other new Australian works, by composers such as Carl Vine, Peter Sculthorpe, Ross Edwards, Nigel Westlake, Elena Kats-Chernin, Mike Nock, Roger Dean, Tristram Cary, Roger Frampton, Anne Boyd and Nigel Butterley.

He has written three books on cello technique: Eloquent Cello Technique (2003), A Cellist’s Companion (2005) and The Larrikin Cellist (2008). He has allowed these publications to fall out of print and expects to improve on them in the near future.

In 2005 and 2006, David Pereira fell seriously ill. He sought hospitalisation (winter of both years) and was diagnosed with obsessive–compulsive disorder (OCD) and depression. Expert psychiatric and psychological interventions eventually proved helpful, but anti-depressants caused tremor that made cello playing impossible. By mid-2007 he had recovered completely and discontinued his drug regimen. He then quickly returned to full professional functioning.

From 2008 to 2012 Pereira ran his own cello-focused subscription recital series emanating from the Wesley Music Centre in Canberra and reaching into nearby regional centres. In 2008 he made a series of recordings of his performances playing a cello which forms part of the A. E. Smith quartet of musical instruments held by the National Museum of Australia. year he played in solo and chamber capacities in the Arts in the Valley and the Canberra International Music Festival.

David Pereira is also a composer. His piece for cello and piano "Mt. Ainslie Rising" was premiered by himself and Tamara Anna Cislowska at the Canberra International Music Festival on 14 May 2013.

Pereira completed yoga teacher training. For a time he taught Yoga in class situation (Vinyasa Flow) but essentially lately it is a private personal practice that he enjoys. He generally recommends Yoga practice to his students because he believes that it improves longevity and health, and because the cello playing he teaches is so strongly affected by Yoga Asana and Meditation. David is married to cellist and Yoga teacher Gillian Pereira and is father of 7 children. The youngest of these is 6 years old in 2017.

== Sources ==
- Davidpereira.com.au
- Violoncello.biz
- YassArts
- ANU School of Music
