= Murray Khouri =

Murray Peter Khouri (8 April 1941 – 27 October 2018) was a New Zealand and Australian clarinettist.

Khouri was born in Wellington, New Zealand to parents of Lebanese descent. At age 16 he joined the New Zealand Symphony Orchestra Youth Orchestra in the year of its creation, 1959. He then studied at the Royal College of Music in London, making his debut at the Wigmore Hall with the London Philharmonic Orchestra in the Clarinet Concertino by Mátyás Seiber. He toured with the D'Oyly Carte Opera Company and became first clarinet with the Royal Ballet Orchestra.

He had an international career, playing with such orchestras as the London Philharmonic Orchestra, Royal Philharmonic Orchestra, the City of Birmingham Symphony Orchestra and the Sydney Symphony Orchestra, and under such conductors as Leopold Stokowski, Pierre Boulez, Georg Solti, Bernard Haitink, Adrian Boult, and Eugen Jochum.

He came to Australia in 1974 to take up the position of Lecturer in Clarinet at the Canberra School of Music. He then based himself in Sydney, New South Wales, where he formed the Australian Contemporary Music Ensemble and was co-founder with Roger Covell of the Australia Ensemble (originally called the University of New South Wales Ensemble). In 2007, he formed the Bowral Autumn Music Festival in the Southern Highlands. In 2008, in New Zealand Khouri founded the Spring Festival concert series in Whanganui.

He was a noted broadcaster for the BBC and Radio NZ.

Murray Khouri had three children from two marriages. He died in Bowral on 27 October 2018, two weeks after undergoing heart surgery.
