= Summer of the Seventeenth Doll (opera) =

Summer of the Seventeenth Doll is a chamber opera in two acts by Richard Mills to a libretto by Peter Goldsworthy, based on the play of the same name by Ray Lawler. The opera was commissioned by the Victoria State Opera and premiered on 19 October 1996 at the Playhouse in Melbourne. It lasts about two hours. It was live simulcast on ABC Classic FM on Australia Day (26 January) 1997

| Role | Voice type | Premiere cast, 19 October 1996 Conductor: Richard Mills |
|---|---|---|
| Pearl | mezzo-soprano | Elizabeth Campbell |
| Olive | soprano | Gillian Sullivan |
| Bubba | soprano | Natalie Jones |
| Emma | soprano | Eilene Hannan |
| Barney | tenor | Barry Ryan |
| Roo | bass-baritone | Gary Rowley |
| Johnnie Dowd | bass baritone | Nicholas Todorovic |
| | | State Orchestra of Victoria |
| Director | | Richard Wherrett |
| Design | | Brian Thompson |
| Lighting | | Nigel Levings |
| Costumes | | Julie Lynch |

Mills also used this musical material for his Symphonic Picture from Summer of the Seventeenth Doll.

For plot details, see the article on the play Summer of the Seventeenth Doll.
