= Katharine Parker =

Australian composer and pianist (1886–1971)

Katharine Parkier
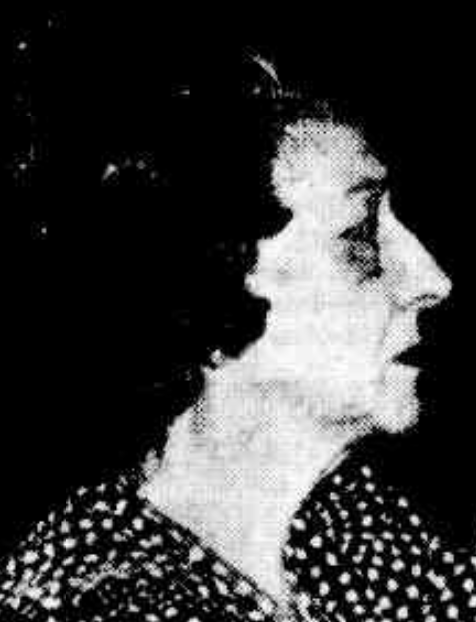
- Born: Catherine Parker; 28 March 1886; Longford, Tasmania, Australia
- Died: 28 March 1971 (aged 85); Sydney, New South Wales, Australia
- Other name: Kitty Parker

Katharine Parker (28 March 1886 – 28 March 1971) was an Australian composer, perhaps best known for her piano piece "Down Longford Way". She was also an accomplished pianist and accompanist.

Kitty Parker was born Catherine Parker at 'Parknook', Lake River, near Longford, Tasmania. Her mother was Florence Agnes Parker [née Leary]; her father was Erskine James Rainy Parker. Florence, the daughter of Joseph Leary M.P., was a superb pianist and gave many concerts. She made sure her daughters were musically trained. Kitty was the most successfully renowned. From 1904 to 1906, she studied for a diploma in Music in Melbourne. During the inaugural, Australian Exhibition of Women's Work she won the Piano Solo Gold Medal. She travelled to London to study with Percy Grainger, who had very high praise for her work and kept in touch with her for many years.

Through Grainger, she met the English tenor Hubert Mortimer Eisdell, whom she married on 16 June 1910 at St Mark's Church, Hamilton Terrace, London. They had one son Michael (1912–1986). In 1911 she made her London concert début as a soloist.

Her work consists mainly of songs for voice and piano and solo piano works. At least one of the latter (Nocturne in F-sharp minor) was published under the name "Kitty Parker".

She died in Sydney on her 85th birthday, 28 March 1971.

She has been championed by her compatriot the pianist Ian Munro, who has recorded some of her works and plays them in recital and has also written a biography of her.
