= Amina Said =

Tunisian author and poet (born 1953)

- Born: 1953 (age 72–73); Tunis
- Education: University of Paris
- Occupations: Author and poet

Amina Said, also spelled Amina Saïd (born 1953 in Tunis) is a Tunisian author and poet. Her father is Tunisian and her mother is French. Since 1978, Said has been living in Paris, where she studied literature at the Sorbonne. She has published several books of poetry, Tunisian folk stories, short stories and essays. Much of her work has been translated into other languages, mainly Arabic, German, Turkish, English and Italian. Said has translated works by the Filipino writer Francisco Sionil José from English into French.

She is a member of the jury (poetry) for the Prix Max-Pol-Fouchet. The Australian composer Richard Mills used her poetry for his work Songlines of the Heart's Desire (2007).

== Awards ==
Said received the Jean Malrieu Prize in 1989 for Feu d'oiseaux, and in 1994, the Charles Vildrac Prize.

== Selected works ==
- Paysages, nuit friable, 1980, Éditions Barbare
- Métamorphose de l'île et de la vague, 1985, Arcantère, Paris
- Sables funambules, 1988, Arcantère/Écrits des forges ISBN 2-89046-122-X
- Feu d'oiseaux, 1989, Les Cahiers du Sud, Marseille
- Nul autre lieu, 1992, Écrits des Forges, Quebec ISBN 2-89046-262-5
- L'une et l'autre nuit, 1993, Editions le Dé bleu, France
- Marcher sur la Terre, 1994, Éditions de la Différence, Paris
- Gisements de lumière, 1998, Éditions de la Différence, Paris
