= Little Hall, Melbourne =

Residential college in Carlton, Melbourne, Australia

Little Hall
- Melbourne
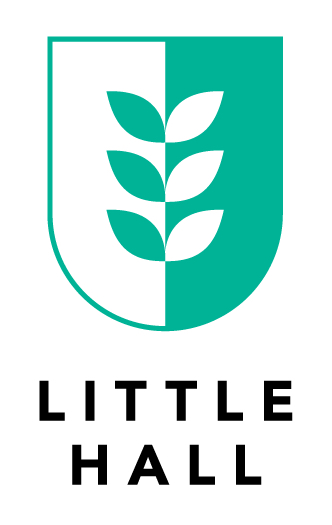
- Little Hall Crest
- Location: 5 Lincoln Square South; Carlton South, Victoria
- Full name: Little Hall
- Established: 2020
- Head: Peter Tregear
- Undergraduates: ~600
- Postgraduates: ~60
- Website: Website

Little Hall is a hall of residence owned by the University of Melbourne in Australia. Established in 2020, it is situated on the former site of the Lincoln Institute of Health Sciences, Carlton, Victoria. It provides accommodation, academic, and pastoral support for up to 669 students studying at the university from around Australia and overseas.

== History ==
Little Hall was established through a multi-million dollar gift from the Hansen-Little Foundation. It was officially opened on 5 May 2021 by the Governor of Victoria, Linda Dessau.

Little Hall is one of three residential accommodation buildings recently opened by the University of Melbourne to provide "high quality, diverse accommodation options operated by the University of Melbourne", preceded by Lisa Bellear House and followed by The Lofts.

== Architecture ==
Designed by local firm Hayball, the architectural form is described by the Australian Institute of Architects as a response to "the University tradition of courtyard and cloister with student common spaces and upper-level rooms arranged around a landscaped inner court... and which is complementary to the industrial heritage streetscape on Lincoln Square south."

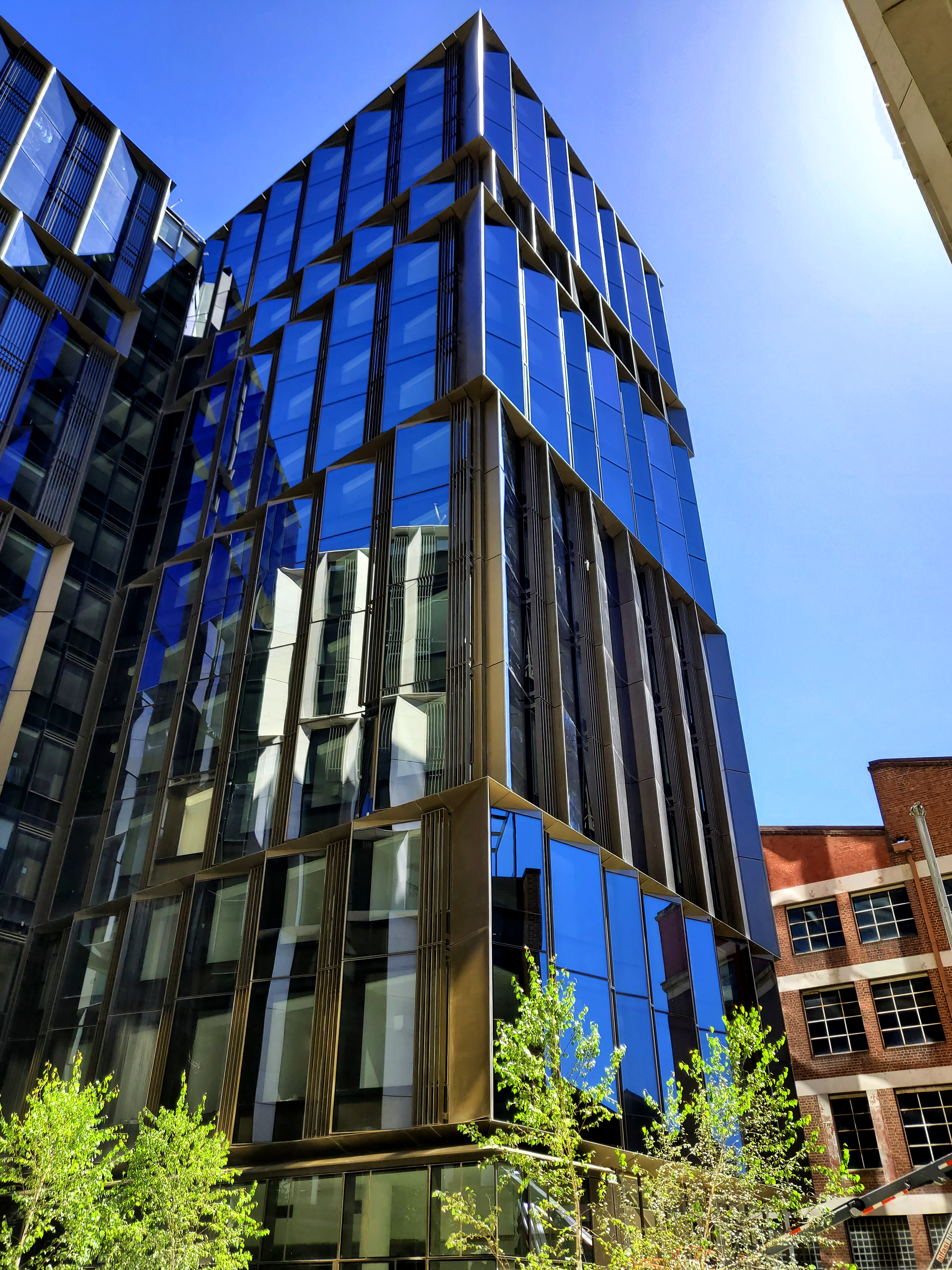
Little Hall facade from the Courtyard

== Hansen Scholarship Program ==
The Hall provides accommodation for 60 'Hansen Scholars'. Twenty Hansen Scholarships are awarded annually to incoming undergraduate students at the University of Melbourne whose background and/or financial circumstances might otherwise present a challenge to accessing the university. Along with accommodation, recipients receive an allowance, and financial, academic, and personal support.
