= Jascha Gopinko =

Violin teacher and orchestra conductor

Jascha Gopinko (15 December 1891 – 4 July 1980), born in Ukraine and later resident in Australia, was a violinist, conductor and teacher of string instruments.

== Life ==
Gopinko was born in 1891 near Mogilev in Ukraine, then part of the Russian Empire. He was the son of Jewish parents Hirsch Gopinko, a cloth manufacturer, and his wife Sarah. He studied violin at Warsaw Conservatory where he was a student of Paweł Kochański. To avoid having to serve in the Russian army, he left Europe and in August 1914 arrived at Melbourne, Australia. He later moved to Kurri Kurri, in the Hunter Valley, New South Wales, where he worked as a coal miner. In his spare time he played his violin; his neighbours, impressed by his playing, asked him to teach their children.

He founded and conducted the Kurri Kurri Mandolin Orchestra, composed of fellow miners. He subsequently founded and conducted the Cessnock Symphony Orchestra, with 55 players, which toured the region. He continued to teach; his students included the violinist Ernest Llewellyn (who considered him to be as great a string teacher as Leopold Auer) and cellist Nelson Cooke. In 1929 he married Rebecca Snidermann, whom he taught to play the cello.

His application to be an Australian citizen was for some time denied, since his presence in the area was regarded as suspicious; he was granted citizenship, after several years of attempts, in 1930.

Gopinko and his wife moved to Sydney in 1936, and was a teacher there, also travelling regularly to teach in Maitland. His playing was regarded as avoiding sentimentality, and in a style that sought to match the composer's intentions. He continued to teach into his eighties. He died in Rose Bay on 4 July 1980, survived by his wife, and was buried at Rookwood Cemetery.
