= ABC Young Performers Awards =

Australian music awards

The ABC Young Performers Awards is a classical music competition for Australian instrumentalists aged 31 and under. Established in 1944, it was held annually until 2015 and resumed in 2017. It Australia's most-prestigious and longest-running classical music competition.

== History ==
For many years, the competition was run by the Australian Broadcasting Corporation (ABC) in conjunction with Symphony Australia, a trading name of Symphony Services Australia Limited, a non-profit arts organisation that operates both domestically and internationally.

In December 2015, it was announced that the competition would be discontinued with immediate effect because Symphony Australia could no longer support it. However in October 2016, the return of the competition from 2017 was announced under the management of the Music & Opera Singers Trust (MOST), a philanthropic organisation.

In 2026, the ABC Young Performers Awards returned to the stewardship of the ABC. Each public semifinal recital, as well as the grand final was broadcast on ABC Classic. The grand final was also broadcast on ABC TV.

=== Names ===
The competition had a number of names throughout its history.

- It was founded in 1944 by the then Australian Broadcasting Commission as a set of six state-based competitions.
- In 1950 it was given the name ABC Concerto and Vocal Competition.
- In 1968 it became known as the ABC Instrumental and Vocal competition.
- In 1987 it was renamed the ABC Young Performers Awards.
- In 1997 the Concerts Division of the ABC devolved to become Symphony Australia, and the competition was then known as the Symphony Australia Young Performers Awards.
- In 2005 after a corporate restructure within Symphony Australia, the competition was rebranded as the ABC Symphony Australia Young Performers Awards.
- In 2016 after the Music & Opera Singers Trust (MOST) took carriage of the awards, the competition was rebranded as the ABC Young Performers Awards.
- In 2026 after the competition returned to the stewardship of the ABC, it retained the name ABC Young Performers Awards.

== Format ==
=== Pre-2026 ===
The structure of the competition also underwent numerous changes. Initially, there were six state-based competitions, with no overall winner. In 1949, the six state winners competed for the Commonwealth final for the first time. In 1950, singers and instrumentalists were separated. In 1968 a preliminary recital stage was introduced, and the instrumental categories were divided into Keyboard and Other. In 1978, four categories were introduced: Vocal, Orchestral Strings, Keyboard, and Other Instrumental.

In 1981, an award for most outstanding competitor was introduced, with the prize including performances with ABC orchestras. In 1986, the state finals were replaced by four category finals.

In 2002, the vocal division of the competition was discontinued and the award was transferred to the Australian Singing Competition.

From 2013 until 2015, preliminary auditions were held in each state, from which 12 finalists were selected irrespective of their instrument. The 12 finalists performed in a recital round, after which six advanced to a chamber music round, and three contested the concerto round. One of the three concerto finalists was chosen as the ABC Symphony Australia Young Performer of the Year. The chamber and concerto rounds were hosted by a different Australian state orchestra each year.

From 2017, preliminary auditions were conducted by digital video submission, from which 12 semifinalists were selected irrespective of their instrument or location. The semifinalists performed in a series of public recitals from which three finalists were selected. One finalist was named the Young Performer of the Year. The awards were broadcast on ABC Classic.

In 2018, the recital round was held at City Recital Hall in Sydney, and the final concerto round was held at the Sydney Opera House with the Sydney Symphony Orchestra. The 2018 competition was won by violinist Emily Sun.

The 2020 Awards were cancelled due to COVID-19 lockdowns across Australia. The rescheduled competition was further disrupted in 2021, and was subsequently held entirely online, with digital entries and pre-recorded semifinal and final rounds. Flautist Eliza Shephard won the 2021-22 competition.

=== Current format ===
In 2026, the Australian Broadcasting Corporation reassumed oversight of the competition, which adopted a three-round format. The adjudication panel was chaired by harpist Marshall McGuire, alongside pianist Aura Go, violinist Sophie Rowell, flautist Eliza Shephard and arts administrator Adam Szabo.

The first round consisted of video auditions of up to 40 minutes, from which 12 semifinalists were selected. Entrants were required to perform an unaccompanied work or movement, a concerto movement and a contrasting work, including at least one piece by an Australian composer.

In August 2026, the 12 semifinalists each performed a live recital of 45 to 60 minutes at Eugene Goossens Hall in Sydney or Iwaki Auditorium in Melbourne. Three finalists were selected to compete in the Grand Final, held on 3 November 2026 in the Concert Hall of the Sydney Opera House. Each performed a concerto with the Sydney Symphony Orchestra, conducted by Benjamin Northey.

The finalists were cellist Charlotte Miles, who performed Edward Elgar's Cello Concerto in E minor; violinist Beatrice Colombis, who performed Sergei Prokofiev's Violin Concerto No. 2 in G minor; and pianist Dillon Chan, who performed Frédéric Chopin's Piano Concerto No. 2 in F minor.

Miles was named the 2026 ABC Young Performer of the Year, with Colombis placing second and Chan third. The Grand Final was broadcast live on ABC Classic on 3 November 2026 and televised on ABC TV and ABC iview on 5 November 2026.

==== Prizes ====
The prizes awarded in 2026 were:

- First prize – Charlotte Miles: A$40,000 and the opportunity to record a solo studio album for ABC Classic.
- Second prize – Beatrice Colombis: A$15,000.
- Third prize – Dillon Chan: A$5,000.

== Notable competitors ==
The Young Performers Awards and its predecessors featured some of the most well-known names in Australian classical music:

- Caroline Almonte (piano; 1992)
- Adele Anthony (violin; 1984)
- Fiona Campbell (mezzo-soprano; 1994)
- Catherine Carby (soprano; 1996)
- Rebecca Chambers (piano; 1993)
- Suyeon Kang (violin, 2005)
- Tamara Anna Cislowska (piano; 1991)
- Marjorie Margaret Conley (soprano; 1952)
- Jeffrey Crellin (oboe; 1973)
- Brieley Cutting (piano; 2006)
- Andrew Kawai (oboe; 2013, 2014)
- Keith Crellin (viola; 1972)
- Andrew Dalton (countertenor; 1972)
- Robert Davidovici (violin; 1967)
- Andrew Day (flute; 1996)
- Deborah de Graaff (clarinet; 1983)
- Brett Dean (viola; 1981)
- Amy Dickson (saxophone; 2004)
- Oliver She (piano; 2010)
- Diana Doherty (oboe; 1985)
- Claire Edwardes (percussion; 1999)
- Richard Farrell (piano; 1944)
- Gustav Fenyo (piano; 1969)
- Glenys Fowles (soprano; 1967)
- Glenn Christensen (violin; 2014)
- David Fung (piano; 2002)
- Charmian Gadd (violin; 1962)
- Duncan Gifford (piano; 1989)
- Miriam Gormley (soprano; 1985)
- Nance Grant (soprano; 1960)
- Bernadette Harvey (piano; 1987)
- David Helfgott (piano; state finalist 6 times)
- Vernon Hill (flute; 1965)
- Caitlin Hulcup (mezzo-soprano; 2001)
- Rosamund Illing (soprano; 1976)
- Beryl Kimber (violin; 1946)
- Alison Lazaroff-Somssich (violin; 1986)
- Bernice Lehmann (piano; 1948)
- Clemens Leske (jr; piano; 1990)
- Geoffrey Douglas Madge (piano; 1963)
- Emma Matthews (soprano; 1993)
- Stephen McIntyre (piano; 1960)
- Ian Munro (piano; 1982)
- Jolanta Nagajek (mezzo-soprano; 1981)
- Mary-Jean O'Doherty (soprano; 2007)
- Max Olding (piano; 1952)
- Jenni Flemming (piano 1978)
- Geoffrey Parsons (piano; 1947)
- Geoffrey Payne (trumpet; 1982)
- Li-Wei Qin (cello; 1993)
- Julie Raines (harp; 1970)
- Lachlan Redd (piano; 1996)
- Paul Rickard-Ford (piano; 1983)
- Sophie Rowell (violin; 2000)
- Victor Sangiorgio (piano; 1978)
- Julian Smiles (cello; 1988)
- Jonathan Summers (baritone; 1973)
- Eliza Shephard (flute; 2022)
- Emily Sun (violin; 2018)
- Simon Tedeschi (piano; 1998)
- Lloyd Van't Hoff (clarinet; 2015)
- Alan Vivian (clarinet; 1975)
- Nathan Waks (cello; 1968)
- Neil Warren-Smith (bass-baritone; 1955)
- Donald Westlake (clarinet: 1952)
- Kristian Winther (violin; 2002)
- Roger Woodward (piano; 1964)
- Ashley William Smith (Clarinet, 2010)
