= Glenn Christensen =

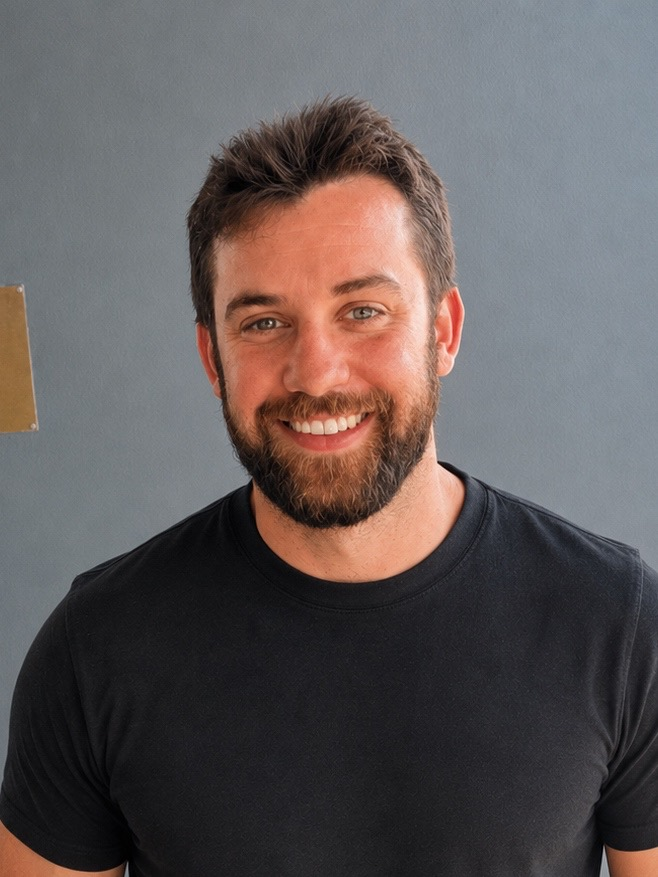
- Glenn Christensen, 2019

Background information
- Born: Mackay, Queensland, Australia
- Genres: Classical
- Occupation: Violinist
- Instrument: Violin
- Years active: 2009–present
- Member of: Queensland Symphony Orchestra
- Formerly of: Australian Chamber Orchestra, Deutsche Kammerphilharmonie Bremen

Glenn Christensen is an Australian classical violinist. He has held positions as Principal First Violin of the Queensland Symphony Orchestra (2012–2014), a member of the Australian Chamber Orchestra (2014–2020), and Deputy Concertmaster and Principal Second Violin of the Deutsche Kammerphilharmonie Bremen (2020–2025). In September 2025, the Queensland Symphony Orchestra announced his appointment as its Associate Concertmaster. He is the founder and artistic director of the Mackay Chamber Music Festival and a member of the Lyrebird Trio.

== Early life and education ==
Christensen was born and raised in Mackay, a regional city in Queensland, Australia. He began learning the violin at around age four, receiving early training through the Suzuki method with local teacher Diane Powell. He first performed with the Australian Chamber Orchestra in 2001 as a child member of Gondwana Voices. He studied with Michele Walsh at the Queensland Conservatorium, Griffith University, graduating in 2011 with a Bachelor of Music with first class honours. According to the Queensland Symphony Orchestra, he was the first student to be awarded the Conservatorium Medal, the Music Medal and the University Medal. He later undertook further study overseas with David Takeno in London and Boris Kuschnir in Vienna, supported in part by the Richard Pollett Memorial Award, and attended the International Musicians Seminar Prussia Cove in the United Kingdom. Christensen participated in Australian Youth Orchestra programs from 2004, playing in the flagship orchestra from 2007 to 2013 and serving as its concertmaster in 2012 and 2013. He also completed a fellowship with the Melbourne Symphony Orchestra.

== Career ==
=== Orchestral positions ===
Christensen was appointed Principal First Violin of the Queensland Symphony Orchestra in 2012, a position he held until 2014. He was an Australian Chamber Orchestra Emerging Artist in 2012 and joined the orchestra as a full-time member in 2014, remaining until July 2020, when he relocated to Germany. From 2020 to 2025, he was Deputy Concertmaster and Principal Second Violin of the Deutsche Kammerphilharmonie Bremen. He has appeared as guest concertmaster or director with the Deutsche Kammerphilharmonie Bremen, Le Cercle de l'Harmonie, the Melbourne Symphony Orchestra and the Queensland Symphony Orchestra, and as guest Principal Second Violin with the Bavarian Radio Symphony Orchestra. In September 2025, the Queensland Symphony Orchestra announced Christensen's appointment as its Associate Concertmaster.

=== Chamber music ===
Christensen is the violinist of the Lyrebird Trio, a piano trio formed in early 2013 with cellist Simon Cobcroft and pianist Angela Turner, all graduates of the Queensland Conservatorium. In July 2013, the trio won the piano trio prizes at the Asia Pacific Chamber Music Competition, including the Beleura Prize for best piano trio and the Peter Druce Audience Prize. The trio held winter residencies at the Banff Centre in Canada in 2014 and 2015 and was Ensemble-in-Residence at the Queensland Conservatorium from 2014 to 2016. It has been Ensemble-in-Residence at the Mackay Chamber Music Festival since 2018. The trio's debut album, featuring works by Beethoven, Nigel Westlake and Smetana, was recorded at the Banff Centre in 2015 and released on the Master Performers label in 2016. Christensen has performed at festivals including the Musica Viva Festival, Coriole Music Festival, Bangalow Music Festival, Port Fairy Spring Music Festival and Murten Classics.

=== Notable performances ===
In 2018, Christensen and fellow ACO violinist Ike See gave the Australian premiere of Anna Clyne's double violin concerto Prince of Clouds with the Australian Chamber Orchestra, directed by Richard Tognetti, as part of the orchestra's national season opener. His performances have been broadcast on ABC Classic.

=== Mackay Chamber Music Festival ===
In 2018, Christensen founded the Mackay Chamber Music Festival in his home town, where he serves as president and artistic director. The festival presents Australian and international musicians and runs an education program for regional students.

== Awards ==
- 2009 – Winner, Kendall National Violin Competition, including the Bach Performance, Australian Composition and Audience Choice prizes and the Timberlay International Travel Scholarship
- 2012 – Inaugural recipient, Richard Pollett Memorial Award
- 2013 – Beleura Prize and Peter Druce Audience Prize, Asia Pacific Chamber Music Competition (with the Lyrebird Trio)
- 2014 – Finalist, ABC Young Performers Awards

== Teaching and other activities ==
Christensen has tutored for Australian Youth Orchestra programs, including the AYO Summer Music Festival, and has served as an adjudicator for the Queensland Youth Music Awards. He was previously an ambassador for the Australian Society for Performing Arts Healthcare.

== Instruments ==
During his tenure with the Australian Chamber Orchestra, Christensen played a 1936 violin by English maker George Wulme-Hudson. His 2009 Kendall National Violin Competition prize was a concert violin made from Australian timbers by luthier Graham Caldersmith.

== Personal life ==
Christensen moved to Germany in 2020, where his partner had been living, and was based in Bremen during his years with the Deutsche Kammerphilharmonie Bremen.
