= Béla Síki =

Hungarian pianist (1923–2020)

Béla Síki (21 February 1923 – 29 October 2020) was a Hungarian pianist.

== Career ==
He was born in Hungary, where he was a student in Budapest of Leo Weiner and Ernest von Dohnányi at the Franz Liszt Music Academy. He moved to Switzerland in 1945, where he studied with Dinu Lipatti and won the 1948 Geneva Competition. His international solo career led him to perform on all five continents with distinguished conductors and orchestras.

In 1965, he moved to the United States, teaching at the University of Washington in Seattle; between 1980 and 1985 he taught at the University of Cincinnati College-Conservatory of Music, moving back to Seattle in 1985, where he taught until his retirement in 2001.

He made several recordings. He was also a teacher and often asked to be on the jury of international musical competitions such as Leeds, Geneva, and Bolzano.

His students included Kathryn Selby, Anton Nel and David Bollard.

Siki died on 29 October 2020 in Seattle, aged 97.

== Partial publication list ==
- Siki, Bela. Piano Repertoire: A Guide to Interpretation and Performance. Shirmer Books, 1981. ISBN 0-02-872390-2.
- Frank Dawes, "Béla Síki", in The New Grove Dictionary of Music and Musicians, ed. Stanley Sadie. 20 vol. London, Macmillan Publishers Ltd., 1980. ISBN 1-56159-174-2
