= Anton Nel =

South African pianist

Anton Nel (born December 29, 1961) is a South African classical pianist.

== Biography ==
Nel was born to Afrikaans-speaking parents in Johannesburg, South Africa. Nel made his debut at the age of twelve with Beethoven's C Major Concerto after only two years of study. A student of Adolph Hallis, he went on to win top honors in several South African national competitions while still in his teens, toured his native country extensively and became a well-known radio and television personality.

Nel graduated from the University of the Witwatersrand in Johannesburg in 1982. He came to the U.S. in 1983, attending the University of Cincinnati, where he pursued his master's degree and Doctoral degrees under Béla Síki and Frank Weinstock. He was appointed to the faculty of the University of Texas at Austin at the age of 23, followed by professorships at the Eastman School of Music, and the University of Michigan, where he was chairman of the piano department. In 2000 Nel was appointed as the Priscilla Pond Flawn Regents Professor of Piano and Chamber music at the University of Texas at Austin, where he heads the Division of Keyboard Studies. In 2010 he became the first holder of the Joe R. and Teresa Lozano Long Endowed Chair in Piano.

Nel was winner of the first prize in the 1987 Naumburg International Piano Competition at Carnegie Hall. He also won several first prizes at the Joanna Hodges International Piano Competition in Palm Desert in 1986.

An acclaimed Beethoven interpreter, Nel has performed the concerto cycle several times, most notably on two consecutive evenings with the Cape Philharmonic in 2003. He has performed with the Cleveland Orchestra, the symphonies of Chicago, San Francisco, Seattle, Detroit, and London, among many others. Nel has an active repertoire of more than 100 works for piano and orchestra, including the newly discovered Piano Concerto No. 3 in E Minor by Felix Mendelssohn of which he gave the North American premiere in 1997.

Nel has three solo CDs as well as several chamber music recordings to his credit. Recent releases include "Anton Nel in Recital", as well as the complete Beethoven Sonatas and Variations for Piano and Cello, and Brahms Sonatas and Hungarian Dances (with Bion Tsang) by Artek Recordings (with distribution by Naxos) and his performances of the Fauré Ballade and Franck Symphonic Variations with the Philharmonia Virtuosi, on the ESS.A.Y label.

== Personal ==
Nel became a U.S. citizen in 2003.
