= Peter Tregear =

Australian musicologist

Peter John Tregear is an Australian musicologist, author and performer.

== Career ==
Tregear's first academic appointment was as a lecturer in music at the University of Queensland in 1999. In 2000 he took up a Lectureship in music at Fitzwilliam and Churchill Colleges, Cambridge, as well as serving as a fellow and Director of Music at Fitzwilliam College, an appointment that "brought new energy" to the musical life of the college. He returned to Australia in 2006 to serve as Dean of Trinity College, University of Melbourne, where he successfully mounted a case for the construction of the College's 'Gateway Building' which included performing arts facilities; and later served as executive director of the Academy of Performing Arts at Monash University.

In 2012 Tregear was appointed Professor and Head of the School of Music at the Australian National University and charged with resolving public and professional discontent that had erupted over the university's imposed job cuts and curriculum changes. Tregear reorganised the degree programs and appointed leading scholar-performers to the school, including Paul McMahon, David Irving and Erin Helyard. By early 2015, however, it had become clear that the university had reneged on its commitment to a foundational level of staffing in the school, and was not providing the school with adequate budgetary information. Tregear "found the University management hostile to his attempts to rebuild confidence in the School". Announcing his resignation in August 2015, ANU's Vice-Chancellor Professor Ian Young nevertheless acknowledged that he had been "a strong advocate for music education in Australia and at ANU" and had "worked tirelessly to build on the School of Music's vision, to promote creative life on campus and in the Canberra community".

Tregear subsequently took up a teaching fellowship at Royal Holloway, University of London. In 2019 he returned to Australia and was appointed Dean of St Mark's College, Adelaide. In November 2020 he became the inaugural director of Little Hall at the University of Melbourne. He is currently a principal fellow of the Melbourne Conservatorium of Music, and an adjunct professor of music at the University of Adelaide.

== Performances ==
As a conductor, Tregear has co-founded two ensembles (IOpera and The Consort of Melbourne,) and mounted several world or local premieres and revivals of historic and neglected operatic repertoire, including the first modern revival of Samuel Arnold and George Colman's 1787 anti-slavery comic opera Inkle and Yarico, the first UK performance of Max Brand's opera Maschinist Hopkins at the Queen Elizabeth Hall in 2001, the complete revival of Anna Amalia's Erwin und Elmire in Gotha, Germany and the Australian premieres of Jonny spielt auf and Rothschild's Violin in Melbourne. With The Consort of Melbourne he has championed the choral music of Percy Grainger and conducted performances with the Kronos Quartet (Melbourne Recital Centre), and The Rolling Stones (Rod Laver Arena). As a singer, Tregear has performed as a soloist with groups such as Ensemble Émigré, Melbourne Opera, and The Nash Ensemble. In April 2024 Tregear mounted and conducted a bicentennial performance of Ludwig van Beethoven's Missa Solemnis at St Paul's Cathedral, Melbourne.

== Writing ==
Tregear has published extensively on the composer Ernst Krenek and the operatic culture of the Weimar Republic, and on twentieth-century Australian music history, especially the music of Percy Grainger and Fritz Hart. He is also a regular contributor to The Conversation, the Australian Book Review, Limelight, and Classic Melbourne as a critic and commentator.

Books

- Fritz Hart: An English Musical Romantic at the Ends of Empire (co-authored with Anne-Marie Forbes) (Melbourne: Lyrebird Press, 2024).
- Enlightenment or Entitlement: Rethinking Tertiary Music Education. Platform Paper No. 38 (Sydney: Currency House, 2014).
- Ernst Krenek and the Politics of Musical Style (Maryland: Scarecrow Press, 2013)
- The Conservatorium of Music University of Melbourne: An Historical Essay to Mark its Centenary (Melbourne: Faculty of Music, 1997).

== Advocacy work ==
Tregear has been described by the Times Higher Education as a "transparency advocate" for his work campaigning for universities to be more open and accountable about their finances and integrity processes.. He has criticed the increasing use of 'gagging'clauses' in employment and separation agreements in Australian Higher Education and has also argued against ministerial interference in the work of the Australian Research Council, and has raised concerns about the treatment of whistleblowers in a regulatory system where some Australian Federal Government agencies, such as the ANU, investigated themselves. Tregear is a founding member of the advocacy group Academics for Public Universities.

== Awards and honours ==
Tregear won the Australian Green Room Award for Best Conductor (Opera) for 2008 for IOpera's production of Elwin and Elmire. He was awarded the Medal of the Order of Australia (OAM) in the 2020 Queen's Birthday Honours "for service to music education and professional societies".
