= Piano Sonata No. 1 (Vine) =

Composition for piano by Carl Vine

The Piano Sonata No. 1 of Carl Vine was composed in 1990 and dedicated to Australian pianist Michael Kieran Harvey, who made the debut recording of the sonata under the Tall Poppies label in 1991. The first printed edition, under the label Chester Music, bears the following description: "A complex and challenging piano sonata composed by Carl Vine for the Sydney Dance Company in 1991. The piece was first performed by Michael Harvey in North Melbourne in June 1991. The music is full of rich chordal movements, unusual flowing harmonies and tonalities, with great extremes of dynamic and energy. Reflecting the physical origins of the piece as a dance, the music is dotted with very strict changes of tempo which require exact adherence, rather than the Rubato approach that typifies many piano interpretations." The work is in two movements, the second of which bears the marking "Leggiero e legato".

== Critical response ==
In the fourth edition of The Record Shelf Guide to Classical CDs & Audio cassettes, Jim Svejda wrote that the "Piano Sonata of 1990 is one of the most significant works in the form since the great Piano Sonata of Elliott Carter."
