= Graham Hair =

Australian composer and academic

Graham Barry Hair (born 1943) is an Australian composer, music scholar and retired academic. He was educated at the University of Melbourne, graduating with a Bachelor of Music degree in 1964 and a Master of Music degree three years later. He then completed a doctorate at the University of Sheffield, which was awarded in 1973.

Hair worked at Riverina College of Advanced Education between 1973 and 1975, before being appointed to a lectureship at La Trobe University in 1976. In 1980, he became Head of the School of Composition at the New South Wales State Conservatorium of Music, where he remained until 1990, when he was appointed Gardiner Professor of Music at the University of Glasgow. There he became the director of the Scottish Voices ensemble in 1991. He retired from the chair in 2001.

Since retirement, Hair has focused on composition and has stated that he completed more works since 2008 than over all of his previous career. He has also been working on a book, The Scottish Voices Reader. A CD of his piano music, performed by Martin Jones, was released by Lyrita in 2024. It includes the Transcendental Concert Studies (1997) and Book 1 of the Rococo Fantasies.
