= Rebecca Chambers (pianist) =

Australian pianist

Rebecca Chambers (born 31 May 1975) is an Australian concert pianist from Melbourne.

== Early life and education ==
In 1996 she was named Young Australian of the Year. She was educated at Victorian College of the Arts. She made her debut as piano soloist with an orchestra at age 7.

I am very proud of being Australian. I appreciate it much more now I’ve gone overseas. We have a unique personality, which is very refreshing.

When interviewed by the Sydney Morning Herald in 2003 for a story about how winners of the Young Australian of the Year Award thought their country had changed, Chambers stated:

Sometimes you have no idea what defines you or your nation until you've spoken to other people and have their perspective. … We all want happiness, we all want to avoid pain and suffering.

She won the piano section of the ABC Young Performers Award in 1993. She received the Roy Rubinstein Award while pursuing her master's degree at the Manhattan School of Music.

== Career and personal life ==
A solo performance with the Manhattan Symphony at the Lincoln Center for the Performing Arts in New York City was her professional debut overseas, as winner of the inaugural Panasonic Award. She also received the John Gaitskell Mensa Award for highest academic and performance achievement. Chambers is married to Greg McMaster, a vocalist (tenor) and a personal trainer; the couple have a son. Together they started a business in May 2014 called Kidko. Kidko holds performing arts classes - singing, dance and drama as incursions and after school classes.

Chambers is the director of Chambers Music and teaches private piano lessons.

She is an accomplished ballroom dancer. She has also produced, filmed and edited five documentaries, which have been aired on Channel 31.

Chambers is a naturopath, having completed an Advanced Diploma in Health Science (Naturopathy) from Endeavour College (formerly the Australian College of Natural Medicine) in 2009.
