= Australia Ensemble =

Australian chamber group

Australia Ensemble UNSW
- Chamber ensemble
- Former name: Australia Ensemble
- Founded: 1980
- Website: www.music.unsw.edu.au/australia-ensemble-unsw

Australia Ensemble UNSW is an Australian chamber group active since 1980.

The group was founded in 1980 as the University of New South Wales Ensemble after a proposal put to the University of New South Wales by musicologist Roger Covell and clarinettist Murray Khouri, then colleagues at the university. Its current Artistic Chair is Paul Stanhope who took over from Covell in 2014. In October 1983 the University of New South Wales Ensemble was renamed the Australia Ensemble, Resident at the University of New South Wales.

Since that time it has occupied a prominent position in Australian music, frequently touring in addition to a Sydney-based concert series. International performances have taken the ensemble to the USA, the UK, the then Soviet Union, Germany, France, Switzerland, Austria, the Netherlands, Poland, New Zealand, Hong Kong, Japan, China, India, South America, South Korea, Vietnam, and Thailand. The Ensemble collaborates with major Australian and international performers, and frequently performs new works by Australian composers.

== Membership ==
=== Current members ===
- 1980– Irina Morozova, viola
- 1982– Dene Olding, violin
- 1991– Julian Smiles, cello
- 1992– Dimity Hall, violin
- 2018– David Griffiths, clarinet

=== Past members ===
- 1980–1985 Murray Khouri, clarinet
- 1980–1981 John Harding, violin
- 1980–1990 David Pereira, cello
- 1980–1998 David Bollard, piano
- 1980–1982 David Stanhope, horn and piano
- 1986 Donald Westlake, guest clarinet
- 1987–1991 Nigel Westlake clarinet
- 1992–1994 Alan Vivian, clarinet
- 1995–2014 Catherine McCorkill, clarinet
- 2015–2017 David Griffiths, associate artist
- 1983–2023 Geoffrey Collins, flute
- 2000–2023 Ian Munro, piano

== Awards and nominations ==
=== ARIA Music Awards ===
The ARIA Music Awards is an annual awards ceremony held by the Australian Recording Industry Association. They commenced in 1987.

Year	Nominee / work	Award	Result	Ref.
1992	Cafe Concertino	Best Classical Album	Nominated	
1996	Shostakovich	Best Classical Album	Nominated	
