= Symphony Services International =

Symphony Services International, formerly known as Symphony Australia, is a centralised organisation formed in 1997 for six Australian symphony orchestras: Adelaide, Melbourne, Queensland, Sydney, Tasmania and Western Australia. The orchestras were formerly part of the Concerts Division of the Australian Broadcasting Corporation.

== History ==
Formerly Symphony Services Australia Limited (known as Symphony Australia), Symphony Services International provides centralised services to its members, the six Australian state symphony orchestras. These services include the Symphony Services Music Library, the Artist Development program, publications/program note editing and international artists’ contracts, visas, travel and accommodation. Some of these services are also provided to other orchestras and individuals on a user-pays basis.

Symphony Services Australia began in 1997 after the Concerts Division of the Australian Broadcasting Corporation devolved. This process came about after the beginnings of privatisation of the Australian six state orchestras, creating the need for a company that provided services in a centralised environment.

Symphony Services International supports the ABC Symphony Australia Young Performers Awards and runs a Conductor Development Program. They also hold one of the Southern Hemisphere's largest classical print music library with over 460,000 items and holds over 3,500 program notes.

The members of Symphony Australia are:

- Adelaide Symphony Orchestra
- Melbourne Symphony Orchestra
- Queensland Symphony Orchestra
- Sydney Symphony Orchestra
- Tasmanian Symphony Orchestra
- West Australian Symphony Orchestra

As of August 2010 Symphony Services International introduced other forms of membership. They now offer the chance to be associate (by invitation only).

Through Symphony Services International's alliance with the ABC, performances with these orchestras may be broadcast live on ABC Classic FM or recorded for future broadcast.

Symphony Services International supports the many needs common to all orchestras:

- Extensive music library
- Goodear Acoustic Shield
- Tour management
- Over 3500 program notes
- Surtitles
- The ABC Symphony Australia Young Performers Awards
- Conductor development
- Composer commissioning and development

== Goodear Acoustic Shield ==
Symphony Services International produces the Goodear Acoustic Shield, an item designed to protect the hearing of orchestral musicians which complies with OHS standards. Positioned behind the head of the player, the shield absorbs sound coming from behind reducing the volume to safe decibel levels. The sound absorption properties of the shield also ensures that the player making the sound from behind does not suffer from additional noise reflected back, unlike acrylic shields and barriers that are commonly used by orchestras.

== Goodear Editions ==
In 2010 Symphony Services International started producing their own orchestral editions of hard to find, out of copyright works. Their first edition was that of Richard Strauss' Der Rosenkavalier Suite.

As of 2016 Goodear Editions has produced over 65 professional standard orchestral materials including Prokofiev's Romeo and Juliet Suite no. 2, Puccini's Nessun Dorma, various Vivaldi pieces and Richard Strauss' Metamorphosen, A Study for 23 solo strings. In early 2016 Goodear Editions was launched on the Goodear online Store offering digital downloads as well as printed materials.
