= Irina Morozova (violinist) =

Australian violist and chamber musician

Irina Morozova is an Australian chamber violist, and founding member of the Goldner String Quartet and the Australia Ensemble.

== Life and career ==
Irina Morozova began to play the violin aged five, and at 15 was made leader of her school orchestra. She switched to playing viola, and became principal viola player in the Australian Chamber Orchestra.

While at University of New South Wales in 1980, Morozova was a founding member of the Australia Ensemble. In 1995, she formed the Goldner String Quartet with members of the Ensemble, including her husband Dene Olding, and couple Dimity Hall and Julian Smiles. The quartet is named in honour of Richard Goldner, who was a teacher of Morozova and mentored all the other members. In 2023, the quartet announced they would disband with a final tour through 2024. That same year, Morozova announced she would step back from playing with the Australia Ensemble regularly.

She has a son, Nicolai, with husband Dene Olding.
