= Hiroyuki Iwaki =

Japanese conductor (1932–2006)

Hiroyuki Iwaki 岩城 宏之 AO
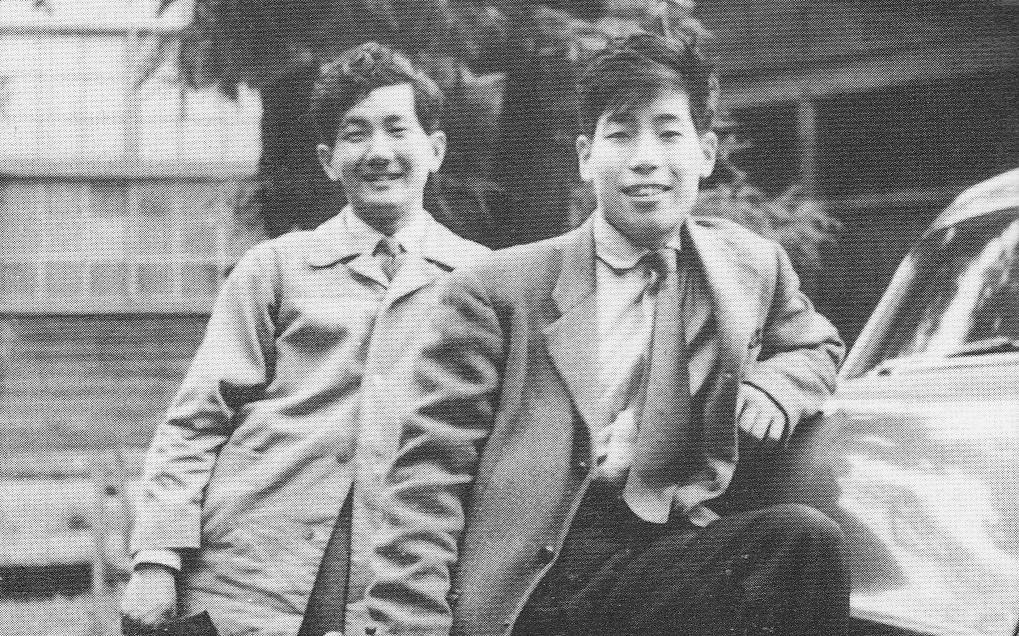
- Iwaki (left) and Naozumi Yamamoto (right)

Background information
- Born: 6 September 1932; Tokyo, Japan
- Died: 13 June 2006 (aged 73) Tokyo, Japan
- Genres: Classical
- Occupation: Conductor
- Instruments: Percussion, xylophone
- Years active: 1956–2006

Hiroyuki Iwaki AO (岩城 宏之, Iwaki Hiroyuki) (6 September 1932 – 13 June 2006) was a Japanese conductor and percussionist.

== Biography ==
Iwaki was born in Tokyo in 1932. Shortly after he entered an elementary school, he moved to Kyoto due to his father's transferral. He came to play the xylophone at nine years old. He moved back to Tokyo when he advanced to the fifth grade.

In May 1945, suffering from an air raid, he evacuated to Kanazawa, where his relatives lived. After the end of World War II, he moved to the mountainous area of Gifu for his father's work. In 1947, he was admitted to Gakushuin Boy's Junior High School, graduating in 1951. He had applied for admission to the Department of German Literature of University of Tokyo, but he gave up on account of a high fever he ran on the eve of the examination. Eventually he went to the Percussion Department, Faculty of Music, Tokyo University of the Arts. However, he dropped out later. In that era, discrimination existed depending on one's specialty within the faculty, and above all, the Percussion Department was ranked among the lowest group in the faculty.

He made his conducting debut with the NHK Symphony Orchestra in 1956, and was later honored as permanent conductor of that orchestra. In 1977, he became the first Japanese to conduct the Vienna Philharmonic, as a substitute for Bernard Haitink, who had taken ill. He first conducted the Melbourne Symphony Orchestra (MSO) on a 1973 Australian tour, and was chief conductor of the MSO for a record term of 23 years (1974–97), during which time he took the orchestra on two tours of Japan. In 1990 he was appointed the orchestra's conductor laureate, while remaining chief conductor until his retirement in 1997. He remained the conductor laureate after retirement.

He made efforts to found the Orchestra Ensemble Kanazawa and was appointed as the first music director, where he established the composer-in-residence system and tried hard to perform their commissioned works first in the world. He conducted all the symphonies of Ludwig van Beethoven in one concert at Tokyo Bunka Kaikan, from the afternoon of 31 December 2004 to the morning of 1 January 2005. In the following year, he performed the same program again from memory at Tokyo Metropolitan Art Space on 31 December 2005.

On 13 June 2006, he died of heart failure in Tokyo, Japan.

== Honours ==
- For his contribution to Australian musical life, he was appointed an honorary Member (AM) of the Order of Australia in 1985, which was later upgraded to honorary Officer status (AO).
- Monash University awarded him an honorary Doctor of Laws in 1986, and in 1991 appointed him their first Fellow of the Faculty of Arts.
- Recipient of the 19th Suntory Music Award (1987)
- In 1990 he was made an Officer of the Order of Arts and Letters in France.
- In 1995 the Australian Broadcasting Corporation named its Southbank studio in Melbourne the Iwaki Auditorium.
- Japan awarded him the Medal of Honour with Purple Ribbon in 1996.

=== ARIA Music Awards ===
The ARIA Music Awards is an annual awards ceremony that recognises excellence, innovation, and achievement across all genres of Australian music. They commenced in 1987.

Year	Nominee / work	Award	Result	Ref.
1994	Violin Concertos (with Melbourne Symphony Orchestra & Dene Olding)	Best Classical Album	Nominated	
