= ANU School of Music =

Australian National University School of Music
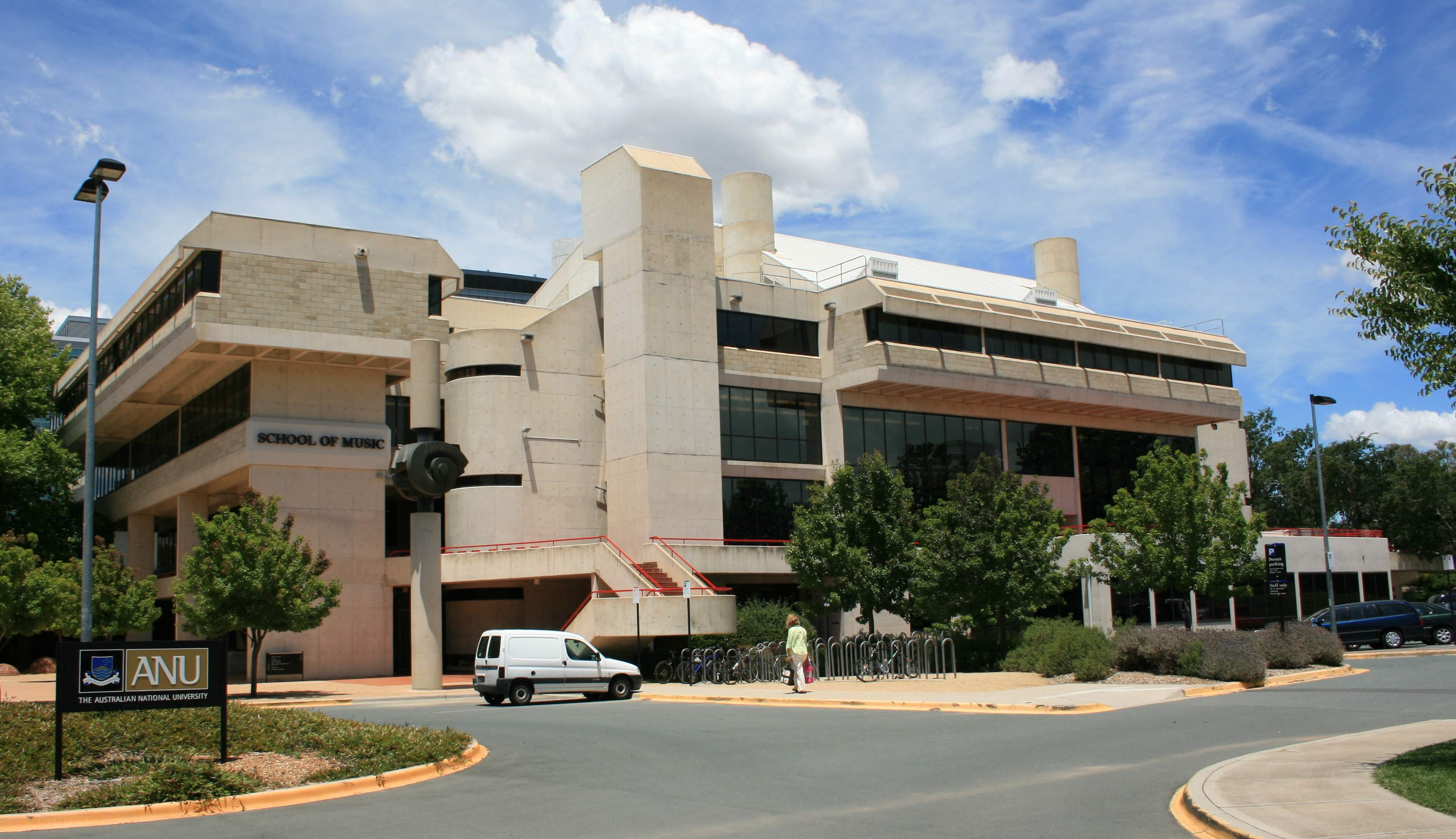

Location
- Building 100, William Herbert Place, Australian National University, Acton, Australian Capital Territory; Canberra, 0200; 35.281°S 149.124°E

Information
- Established: 1965; 61 years ago
- Head of School: Kim Cunio
- Faculty: Music
- Enrolment: 250+
- Campus: Urban
- Colours: Crimson, gold, navy
- Website: ANU School of Music

The ANU School of Music is a school in the Research School of Humanities and the Arts, which forms part of the College of Arts and Social Sciences of the Australian National University. It consists of four buildings, including the main School of Music building – which contains Llewellyn Hall – and the Peter Karmel Building.

The School of Music's teaching encompasses performance tuition, alongside musicianship, musicology, sound recording, and ethnomusicology.

== History ==
The School of Music was established under the name Canberra School of Music in 1965 with Ernest Llewellyn as the founding director. The original plans for the school were prepared in the 1960s when the Department of the Interior recognized the need to establish centres for art and music study in the national capital, with the vision of providing high-level performance and practice. The Canberra School of Music was established in 1965. It was first located in the Canberra suburb of Manuka and in 1976 moved to its current site on Childers Street between the Australian National University and the city centre.

Llewellyn's vision for the school was based on the Juilliard School; he regarded Isaac Stern, with whom he had studied at Juilliard and who was his longtime friend, as the "father" of the school. He set the school up with a hand-picked staff and a focus on the training of soloists, chamber and orchestral musicians. As part of his grand plan he also envisaged the development of a national symphony orchestra based in Canberra. This has never been established, although Canberra has its own professional part-time orchestra, the Canberra Symphony Orchestra, based in Llewellyn Hall.

Responsibility for the Canberra School of Music passed from the Department of the Interior to the Minister for Education and Science, John Gorton. Control was transferred in 1974, and Sir Richard was the first chairman of the Canberra School of Music. The Kingsland Room in the School of Music is named in his honour. The current School of Music building was opened in 1976.

In 1988 the Canberra School of Music and the Canberra School of Art combined to form the Canberra Institute of the Arts, and amalgamated with the Australian National University as the ANU Institute of the Arts in 1992.

In 2001, the Peter Karmel Building was opened to house the jazz and percussion areas, and the Centre for New Media Arts. An extension to the music library was completed at the same time. In 2004, the National Institute of the Arts was dissolved, with the Schools of Music and Art becoming part of what was then the ANU Faculty of the Arts.

In 2007–08 the future of the School of Music came under review by the Australian National University. In 2012 the School of Music was subject of heated public debate, as the university responded to an annual running loss of $3 million, with a reduction in the university's internal subsidy and overhaul of the school's curriculum and staffing arrangements. The head of school at the time, Walter resigned shortly after in June 2012 to take up the headship of the Hong Kong Academy for Performing Arts. Peter Tregear, a graduate of the University of Cambridge and a prominent conductor and musicologist, was appointed to replace him and took up his post in August 2012. Tregear, however, found the university management "hostile to his attempts to rebuild confidence in the School". Separately, the commonwealth authority responsible for managing worker's compensation claims, Comcare, launched an investigation into a series of complaints relating to untenable workloads and a toxic work culture. Tregear resigned in August 2015. In 2016 a review of the school led by former public service commissioner Andrew Podger backed Tregear's assessment of poor governance and called for "an overhaul of its governance and financial management".

Composer Kenneth Lampl, head of school from March 2017 until 2019, described the commencement of his tenure as a "new era". After a two-year term, he resigned as Head, while continuing to teach. He did this after he was investigated and then fully exonerated following the independent review of an unsubstantiated and as it turned out baseless allegation of plagiarism in his Canberra Cavalry Song; ANU at that point issued an official public statement supporting Lampl, clarifying that the choice to step away from administrative governance was entirely his own decision, and that the university was delighted that he had agreed to stay on to teach. Kim Cunio was appointed as his successor less than two weeks later.

In 2025, it was announced that, as part of the ANU's controversial Renew ANU money-saving plan, the School of Music would be decommissioned, instead becoming a department of the newly formed School of Creative and Cultural Practice. As part of this restructure, many key elements of the school would be cut, including staff jobs, one on one tuition, and composition classes, with a focus instead on "Indigenous Music in a contemporary context, and Music and Wellbeing". Many public figures in the Australian and ANU music community have since spoken out against the changes, including former heads Larry Sitsky and Peter Tregear. Violinist and conductor Richard Tognetti, calling the changes an "act of cultural vandalism", and Canberra Symphony Orchestra chief executive Rachel Thomas, along with many students protesting around ANU campus, have also spoken out. The university reversed the decision to close the school in December 2025.

== Staff ==
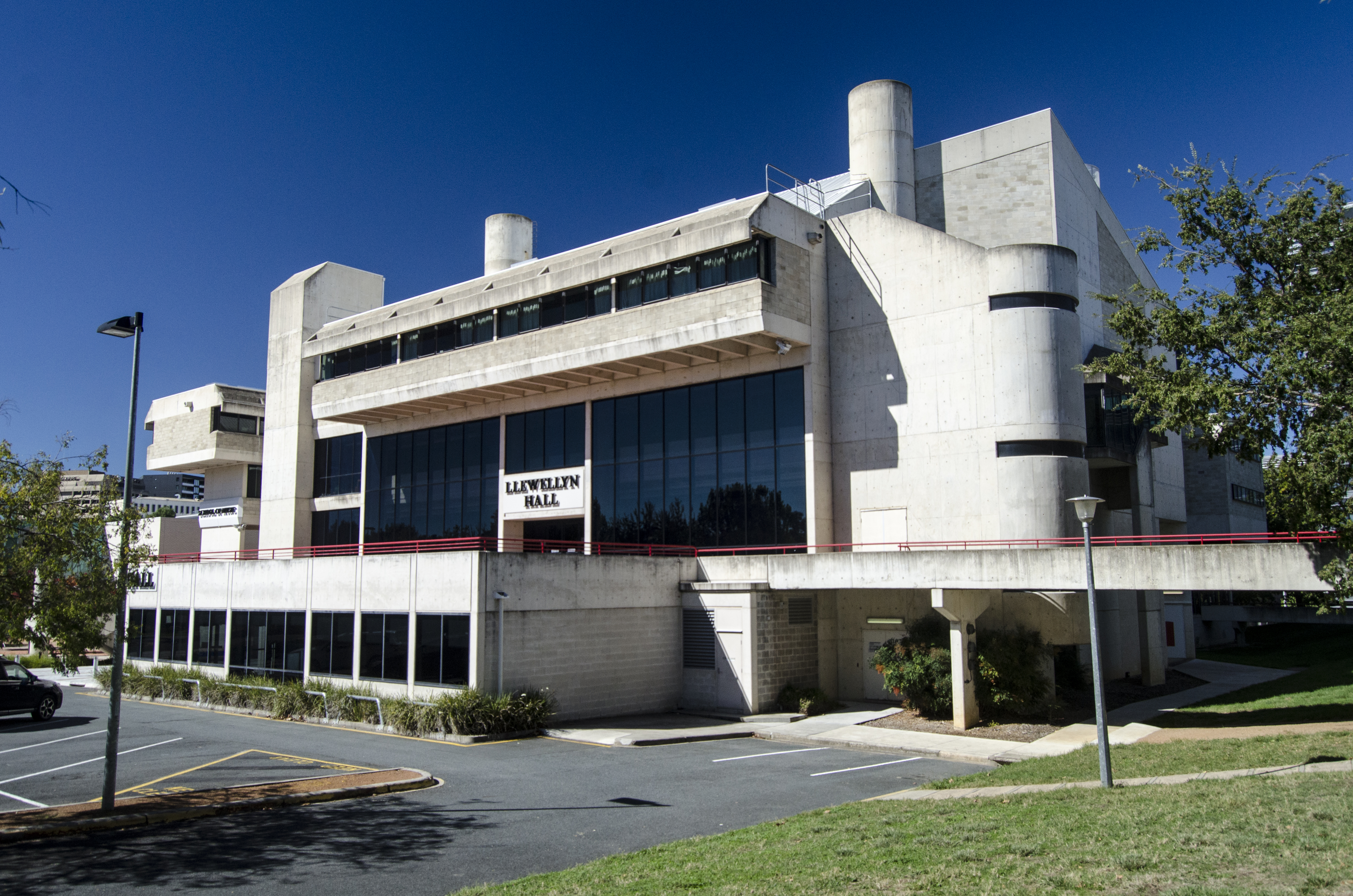

Some of the staff present as of December 2021 include:

- Kim Cunio (Head of School 2019–present)
- Kenneth Lampl (film and video game composition)
- Larry Sitsky (piano and composition)
- David Pereira (cello)
- Christopher Sainsbury (composition)
- Scott Davie (piano)
- Cheryl Barker (soprano)
- Miroslav Bukovsky (trumpet)

Past staff include:

- Nicolette Fraillon (director 1998–2002)
- Don Banks (composition)
- Jim Cotter (composition)
- Alice Giles (harp)
- Geoffrey Lancaster (fortepiano and conducting)
- David Worrall (composition)

== Location, grounds and buildings ==
The School of Music complex is situated on the south-eastern edge of the Australian National University campus, between the School of Art and University Avenue, bordered on the north-western face by Childers Street.

The complex itself consists of four buildings; two of which are demountables. The demountable buildings, which are joined, were installed in the 1990s and house some of the graduate facilities as well as some administration and technical capacity of the Music area and are colloquially known as "The Shed".

The two permanent buildings, the main School of Music Building and the Peter Karmel building are both built in contemporary architectural styles.

=== Building ===
The main School of Music building was designed for the National Capital Development Commission in 1970 by architects Daryl Jackson and Evan Walker. The architectural works of Jackson at this time can be seen to be in parallel with those of noted U.S. architect Paul Rudolph, most notably his 1960s interpretations of Le Corbusier's later works.

The following, taken from the Australian National University's Heritage Factsheet on the School of music, provides a physical description of the building and its architectural merits and heritage:

The building is a six level building, oriented inwardly to the core of the site, with the public and administration areas wrapped around the more acoustically sensitive performing and teaching areas as a barrier against the noise. In vertical relationship of areas the spaces which tend to generate greater noise problems are located on Levels Five and Six. It was originally anticipated that there would be significant external traffic noise from an arterial road but this was never built. Daryl Jackson described the design in the following way "The School's boldness of form is due to these factors as well as a desire to produce an assertive cubist arrangement whose parts explore landscape and figurative metaphors, to create architectural presence." The building has white off form concrete walls, concrete framing and floors with white concrete blockwork infill and no large areas of glazing, apart from glazing to the external circulation routes around the 1,500 seat auditorium and a metal deck roof. There is a sculpture by Norma Redpath adjacent to the entry. The heavily sculptured forms of this building come from the phase in Daryl Jackson's work when he pursued ideas of rendering large mass in a way he called "cubist", using common materials, particularly off-form concrete and masonry. In addition there are a number of other items which are manipulated sculpturally, such as the external expression of stairs as cylindrical tubes and a visually weighty cantilevered room at the upper levels of the building as if it were a garret.

— ANU Heritage Factsheet, School of Music

The building is heritage-listed by:

- Royal Australian Institute of Architects (Ref: R031);
- ACT Heritage Register (Nominated);
- Commonwealth Heritage List (Place ID – 105636);
- National Trust of Australia (ACT) Classification List: Classified.

Refurbishments to the main School of Music building in 2008 after a storm caused serious damage to the roof have included the complete refurbishment of Llewellyn Hall.

=== Llewellyn Hall ===
The main School of Music building houses Llewellyn Hall, a 1,400-seat concert hall that not only hosts events of the School (including most of the Australian National University's graduation ceremonies), but is also the venue for concerts by musical organisations of the city (including the Canberra Symphony Orchestra, Canberra Youth Orchestra, Canberra Choral Society and the Llewellyn Choir) and the nation (such as the Australian Chamber Orchestra, and Musica Viva).

The ACT government provides Llewellyn Hall $200,000 each year in addition to the ANU's $1.6 million annual funding for outreach programs. The 2010 Loxton Review of the Arts in Canberra recommended that in regards to Llewellyn Hall, "with such significant support, the ACT Government should leverage considerably greater benefits for the ACT arts and public, based more on a sharing arrangement, with extended and more affordable access. If this is not possible, it may be necessary to consider whether ACT public arts funding could be more productively invested in the arts and music elsewhere". The Loxton report also recognized the vital contribution the ANU School of Music provided the ACT public.

Llewellyn Hall came about directly through the initiative of its namesake, Ernest Llewellyn, the founding Head of School and instigator of the Canberra School of Music project. Llewellyn's plans, drawn with renowned architect Daryl Jackson, provided for a large "lecture hall" (with seating for 1,300 people and full audio and lighting facilities), smaller rehearsal spaces, teaching studios and offices.

=== Peter Karmel Building ===
An addition to the School of Music is the Peter Karmel Building, opened in 2001. The work of MGT Architects, this building is discretely separate – both in a site planning and architectural manner – to the original building.

The Peter Karmel Building was designed as a new freestanding addition to the Canberra School of Music to accommodate numerous practice and performance functions for the School, with specific accommodation of the Jazz and Percussion Departments and the Australian Centre for Arts and Technology (ACAT). The two-storey building forms a new Entry Court to the School of Music complex and provides integrated connections between practice and performance spaces in both the original School and new addition. The façade design commission by artist Marie Hagerty was intended to be an opportunity for the artist to work with the large-scale architectural forms in their three-dimensional landscape setting to create a patterning, "marking", and enlivening of the glazed and solid surfaces of the building's exterior.

The building, named after former ANU Vice-Chancellor Professor Peter Karmel, was designed and project managed by Guida Mosely Brown Architects in conjunction with commissioned artist Marie Hagerty. It currently houses the Centre for New Media Arts, the Jazz Department and the Percussion Department. It also contains the fourth most important performance space in the ANU campus (after Llewellyn Hall, the Theatre Arts Performance Space and Theatre 1, the Home of Canberra Repertory), the Band Room.

=== Architecture awards and legacy ===
At the 2026 Australian Institute of Architects Awards of the ACT Chapter, the School of Music designed by Jackson Walker for NCDC was awarded the Sir Roy Grounds Award for Enduring Architecture.
