= Richard Mills (composer) =

Australian conductor and composer (born 1949)

Richard John Mills AO FAHA (born 14 November 1949) is an Australian conductor and composer. He was the artistic director of Victorian Opera from 2013 to 2023, and formerly artistic director of the West Australian Opera and artistic consultant with Orchestra Victoria. He was commissioned by the Victoria State Opera to write his opera Summer of the Seventeenth Doll (1996) and by Opera Australia to write the opera Batavia (2001).

== Career ==
Mills was born and grew up in Toowoomba, Queensland, and went to Nudgee College in Brisbane. He studied in London with Edmund Rubbra at the Guildhall School of Music and Drama and worked as a percussionist in England and for the Tasmanian Symphony Orchestra. Mills started conducting and composing in the 1980s.

In 1988, to celebrate the Australian Bicentenary, the Australian Broadcasting Corporation (ABC) commissioned Mills to re-orchestrate Charles Williams's Majestic Fanfare, the signature tune of ABC news and television broadcasts, in a more modern, Australian idiom.

He was engaged to conduct Opera Australia's first complete production of Richard Wagner's Der Ring des Nibelungen in the State Theatre, Melbourne, in 2013, the bicentenary of the composer's birth. On 5 June 2013, he withdrew from the Opera Australia Ring cycle.

== Works ==
=== Works for the stage ===
- Snugglepot and Cuddlepie (1987), ballet
- Earth Poem / Sky Poem (1993), a music theatre work for Aboriginal dancers and musicians, orchestra and electronic sounds
- Summer of the Seventeenth Doll (1996), opera in two acts, libretto by Peter Goldsworthy after the play by Ray Lawler
- Batavia (2001), opera in three acts, libretto by Peter Goldsworthy
- The Love of the Nightingale (2007), opera in two acts, libretto by Timberlake Wertenbaker
- Galileo (December 2023), libretto by Malcolm Angelucci

=== Vocal and choral works ===
- Festival Folk Songs (1985) for mezzo-soprano, tenor, boy soprano, large mixed chorus, children's chorus, 2 brass choirs (optional) and orchestra
- Voyages and Visions (1988) for soprano, alto, tenor, bass, boy soprano, choir and large orchestra, texts by James McCauley, written for the Australian Bicentenary
- Sappho Monologues (1991) for soprano and orchestra, texts after Sappho, edited by the composer
- Symphonic Poems (2001), setting of David Campbell and James McAuley poems for soprano, mezzo-soprano, bass, large mixed chorus, 3 brass bands
- The Little Mermaid (2005) for children's chorus, narrator, orchestra; text after Hans Christian Andersen
- Four Antiphons of the Blessed Virgin (2 September 2005, at the Ospedaletto, Venice) for tenor and organ
- Songlines of the Heart's Desire (2007), commissioned by the Ian Potter Trust, to poems by an anonymous fourth-century Chinese poet, Bengali Rabindranath Tagore, American Kenneth Patchen, French Tunisian Amina Said, and Australians John Shaw Neilson and Judith Wright.

=== Concertos ===
- Trumpet Concerto (1982) for trumpet and orchestra (written for Bruce Lamont)
- Soundscapes for Percussion and Orchestra (1983) for percussion solo and orchestra
- Fantastic Pantomimes (1987) for flute, oboe, clarinet, horn, trumpet and orchestra
- Cello Concerto (1990) for cello and orchestra (written for Raphael Wallfisch)
- Flute Concerto (1990) for flute and orchestra (written for James Galway)
- Violin Concerto (1992) for violin and orchestra
- Concerto for Violin and Viola (1993) for violin and viola solo and chamber orchestra (written for and premiered by Dene Olding and Irina Morozova)
- Double Concerto (2002) for violin and clarinet (written for Walter and Elsa Verdehr from Michigan State University)
- Double Concerto (2018) for two violins and strings (written for Melbourne Chamber Orchestra)

=== Orchestral ===
- Bamaga Diptych (1989)
- Tenebrae (1992)
- Pages from a secret journal
- Symphony of Nocturnes (2008)

=== Chamber works ===
- Sonata for Brass Quintet (1985)
- String Quartet No. 1 (1990), revised (2007)
- Four Miniatures (1992) for violin, clarinet and piano
- Here where death and life are met (no year) for high voice and piano, text by Judith Wright
- Requiem Diptych for Brass Quintet (1997)
- Songs without Words (1998) from the poems of Ern Malley for oboe and string quartet
- Jamaican Entertainment (2002) arrangements of music by Arthur Benjamin for flute, clarinet, soprano and piano, see: Two Jamaican Pieces).
- A Little Diary (2002) for clarinet and string quartet
- Woman to Man (2004) song cycle for mezzo-soprano and piano, text by Judith Wright
- String Quartet No. 2 (2007)
- String Quartet No. 3
- String Quartet No. 4, Glimpses from My Book of Dada (2010)
- Impromptu, after Schubert (2014)
- Lachrymae, Chorales… Postlude (2014) for string octet

=== Instrumental works ===
- Epithalamium (1985) for solo organ
- Pastoral for Solo Oboe (1993)
- Six Preludes for Solo Oboe (1991)

=== Educational works ===
- Little Suite for Orchestra (1983) for student orchestra
- Miniatures and Refrains (1986) for student string quartet
- Sonatina for String Quartet (1986) for student string quartet

== Awards and nominations ==
In 1982, he won the Albert H. Maggs Composition Award.

In 1999, he was appointed a Member of the Order of Australia (AM). He was promoted to Officer of the Order of Australia in the 2024 Australia Day Honours for "distinguished service to the performing arts as a composer, conductor and artistic director".

In 2019, he was elected an Honorary Fellow of the Australian Academy of the Humanities (FAHA).

=== APRA Awards ===
The APRA Awards are held in Australia and New Zealand by the Australasian Performing Right Association to recognise songwriting skills, sales and airplay performance by its members annually.

Year	Nominee / work	Award	Result	Ref.
2000	Concerto for Violin and Viola by Tasmanian Symphony Orchestra (conductor Richard Mills)	Most Performed Contemporary Classical Composition	Nominated	
2002	Batavia by Orchestra Victoria (conductor Richard Mills)	Best Performance of an Australian Composition	Won	
2002	Batavia by Orchestra Victoria (conductor Richard Mills)	Vocal or Choral Work of the Year	Won	
2005	Concerto for Guitar and Strings by Karin Schaupp & Tasmanian Symphony Orchestra (conductor Richard Mills)	Orchestral Work of the Year	Won	
2008	The Love of the Nightingale – Richard Mills	Best Composition by an Australian Composer	Nominated	
2009	String Quartet No. 3 – Richard Mills	Best Performance of an Australian Composition	Nominated	
2009	Palm Court Suite by Tasmanian Symphony Orchestra (Richard Mills)	Orchestral Work of the Year	Nominated	
2009	Tivoli Dances by Tasmanian Symphony Orchestra (Richard Mills)	Orchestral Work of the Year	Won	

=== ARIA Music Awards ===
The ARIA Music Awards is an annual awards ceremony that recognises excellence, innovation, and achievement across all genres of Australian music. They commenced in 1987.

Year	Nominee / work	Award	Result	Ref.
1999	Ariel's Music (with Queensland Symphony Orchestra & Paul Dean	Best Classical Album	Nominated	

=== Bernard Heinze Memorial Award ===
The Sir Bernard Heinze Memorial Award is given to a person who has made an outstanding contribution to music in Australia.

Year	Nominee / work	Award	Result	Ref.
1996	Richard Mills	Sir Bernard Heinze Memorial Award	Awarded	

=== Don Banks Music Award ===
The Don Banks Music Award was established in 1984 to publicly honour a senior artist of high distinction who has made an outstanding and sustained contribution to music in Australia. It was founded by the Australia Council in honour of Don Banks, Australian composer, performer and the first chair of its music board.

Year	Nominee / work	Award	Result
1996	Richard Mills	Don Banks Music Award	Won

=== Green Room Awards ===
- He received the Green Room Award in 2001, 2002 and 2024.

=== Helpmann Awards ===
The Helpmann Awards is an awards show, celebrating live entertainment and performing arts in Australia, presented by industry group Live Performance Australia (LPA) since 2001.

Year	Nominee / work	Award	Result	Ref.
2002	Batavia – Richard Mills & Peter Goldsworthy	Best New Australian Work	Won	
2002	Batavia – Richard Mills	Best Original Score	Nominated	
2005	The Love of the Nightingale	Best Performance in a Classical Concert	Nominated	
2007	The Love of the Nightingale – Richard Mills & Timberlake Wertenbaker	Best New Australian Work	Nominated	
2007	The Love of the Nightingale – Richard Mills	Best Original Score	Nominated	
2007	The Love of the Nightingale – Richard Mills	Best Music Direction	Won	
2008	Songlines for the Heart's Desire – Richard Mills	Best Original Score	Nominated	
2012	Elektra – Richard Mills	Best Musical Direction	Nominated	
