= Carl Vine =

Australian composer

Carl Vine AO
- Born: October 8, 1954 (age 72); Australia
- Origin: Perth, Western Australia
- Genres: Classical music; Theatre; Choral
- Occupations: Composer; Pianist
- Formerly of: Flederman
- Website: www.carlvine.com

Carl Edward Vine, AO (born 8 October 1954) is an Australian composer of contemporary classical music.

From 1975 he has worked as a freelance pianist and composer with a variety of theatre and dance companies, and ensembles. Vine's catalogue includes eight symphonies, thirteen concertos, music for film, television and theatre, electronic music and numerous chamber works. From 2000 until 2019 Carl was the Artistic Director of Musica Viva Australia. Within that role he was also Artistic Director of the Huntington Estate Music Festival from 2006, and of the Musica Viva Festival (Sydney) from 2008. In 2005 he was awarded the Don Banks Music Award. In the 2014 Queen's Birthday Honours List, Vine was appointed as an Officer of the Order of Australia (AO), "for distinguished service to the performing arts as a composer, conductor, academic and artistic director, and to the support and mentoring of emerging performers." Vine currently lectures in composition and orchestration at the Sydney Conservatorium of Music.

== Career ==
Vine was born in Perth, Western Australia. He played the cornet from the age of 5, and took up the piano when he was 10. A teenage fascination with the music of Karlheinz Stockhausen inspired a period of Modernism, which he explored until the mid-1980s. He studied physics, then composition at the University of Western Australia (now the UWA Conservatorium of Music), before moving to Sydney in 1975, where he worked as a freelance pianist and composer with a variety of theatre and dance companies, and ensembles.

Vine first came to prominence in Australia as a composer of music for dance, with 25 dance scores to his credit. In 1979 he co-founded the contemporary music ensemble "Flederman", which presented many of Vine's own works. From 1980 to 1982 he lectured in electronic music composition at the Queensland Conservatorium of Music in Brisbane.

His catalogue includes eight symphonies, thirteen concertos, music for film, television and theatre, electronic music and numerous chamber works. Although primarily a composer of modern classical music, he has undertaken tasks as diverse as arranging the Australian national anthem and writing music for the 1996 Atlanta Olympics closing ceremony.

From 2000 until 2019 Carl was the Artistic Director of Musica Viva Australia, the world's largest entrepreneur of chamber music. Within that role he was also Artistic Director of the Huntington Estate Music Festival from 2006, and of the Musica Viva Festival (Sydney) from 2008. In 2005, he was awarded the Don Banks Music Award, the highest accolade the Australia Council for the Arts can confer on a musician.

In 2012, his second piano concerto was premiered by Piers Lane and the Sydney Symphony Orchestra, and the Australian Chamber Orchestra with soprano Danielle de Niese premiered his solo cantata, The Tree of Man, after the 1955 novel by Patrick White.

In the 2014 Queen's Birthday Honours List, Vine was appointed as an Officer of the Order of Australia (AO), "for distinguished service to the performing arts as a composer, conductor, academic and artistic director, and to the support and mentoring of emerging performers."

Vine is based in Sydney, where he works as a freelance composer. His trombone concerto Five Hallucinations was premiered by the Chicago Symphony Orchestra in October 2016. Since 2014, Vine has also worked at the Sydney Conservatorium of Music as a senior lecturer in composition.

== Works ==
=== Symphonic ===
- Symphony No. 1 MicroSymphony (1986)
- Symphony No. 2 (1988)
- Symphony No. 3 (1990)
- Symphony No. 4 (1992; Symphony No. 4.2, revised 1998)
- Symphony No. 5 Percussion Symphony (1995)
- Symphony No. 6 Choral Symphony (1996)
- Symphony No. 7 Scenes from Daily Life (2008)
- Symphony No. 8 The Enchanted Loom (2018)

=== Concertante ===
- Percussion Concerto (1987)
- Concerto Grosso (violin, flute, oboe, horn and strings) (1989)
- Gaijin (koto, strings, pre-recorded electronics) (1994)
- Oboe Concerto (1996)
- Piano Concerto No. 1 (1997; commissioned by Sydney Symphony Orchestra)
- Pipe Dreams (concerto for flute and strings) (2003)
- Cello Concerto (2004)
- Violin Concerto (2011)
- Piano Concerto No. 2 (2012)
- Concerto for Orchestra (2014)
- Five Hallucinations (concerto for trombone and orchestra) (2016)
- Wonders (cantata for soprano, baritone, two choirs and orchestra) (2016)
- Implacable Gifts (concerto for two pianos and orchestra) (2018)
- Zofomorphis (concerto for 4-hand piano duet and orchestra) (2022)

=== Other orchestral ===
- Celebrate Celeberrime (1993) (orchestral fanfare)
- V (2002) (orchestral fanfare)
- The Tree of Man (2012) (cantata for soprano and string orchestra)
- Gravity Road (2014) (a tone poem)
- Our Sons (2015) (cantata for soprano and string orchestra)
- Dreams Undreamt (2024) (orchestral fanfare)

=== Chamber music ===
- String Quartet No. 1 (Knips Suite) (1979)
- String Quartet No. 2 (1984)
- String Quartet No. 3 (1994)
- String Quartet No. 4 (2004)
- String Quartet No. 5 (2007)
- String Quartet No. 6 (Child's Play) (2017)
- String Quintet (2009)
- Miniature I Peace (solo viola) (1973)
- Miniature II (viola duet) (1974)
- Miniature III (flute, trombone, piano, percussion) (1983)
- Miniature IV (flute, clarinet, cello, violin, viola, cello, piano) (1988)
- Café Concertino (1984), for flute, clarinet, violin, viola, cello, piano
- Sonata for flute and piano (1992)
- Inner World (solo cello with pre-recorded electronics) (1994)
- Fantasia for piano quintet (2013)
- The Village for piano trio (2014)
- Strutt Sonata for cello and piano (2017)
- Clarinet Quintet (2022)
- Endless (for guitar and string quartet) (2023)

=== Piano ===
- Piano Sonata No. 1 (1990)
- Five Bagatelles (solo piano) (1994)
- Piano Sonata No. 2 (1997)
- Rash (piano with CD) (1997)
- Red Blues (solo piano) (1999)
- The Anne Landa Preludes (solo piano) (2006)
- Piano Sonata No. 3 (2007)
- Sonata for Piano Four Hands (2009)
- Toccatissimo (2011)
- The Arrival of Implacable Gifts (piano four hands) (2017)
- Piano Sonata No. 4 (2019)
- Five Intermezzi (2022)
- Gothic Fantasy (2023)

=== Dance ===
- 961 Ways to Nirvana (1977)
- Incident at Bull Creek (1977)
- Poppy (1978)
- Everymans Troth (1978)
- Scene Shift (1979)
- Kisses Remembered (1979)
- Knips Suite (1979)
- Missing Film (1980)
- Return (1980)
- Donna Maria Blues (1981)
- Colonial Sketches (1981)
- Daisy Bates (1982)
- Hate (1982)
- A Christmas Carol (1983)
- Prologue and Canzona (1986)
- Legend (1988)
- On The Edge (1989)
- Piano Sonata (1990)
- The Tempest (1991)
- Beauty and The Beast (1993)
- Mythologia (2000)
- The Silver Rose (2005)
- Tribe's Desire (2010)

=== Theatre ===
- The Dreamers (play – 1975)
- New Sky (mime by Judith Anderson – 1981)
- Signal Driver (play by Patrick White – 1982)
- Shepherd on the Rocks (play by Patrick White – 1987)
- The Ham Funeral (play by Patrick White – 1989)
- The Master Builder (play by Ibsen – 1991)
- Night on Bald Mountain (play by Patrick White – 1996)
- A Hard God (play by Peter Kenna – 1997)

=== Film and television ===
- The Dunstan Documentaries (TV) (1982)
- You Can't Push the River (1993)
- Bedevil (1993)
- The Battlers (TV) (1994)
- Urn (short film) (1995)
- What Comes After Why? (short film) (1995)
- White Fella's Dreaming (documentary) (1997)
- Marriage Acts (TV) (2000)
- The Potato Factory (TV) (2000)

== Discography (partial) ==
- Café Concertino, Tall Poppies, TP002 (1992)
- Chamber Music Volume 1, Tall Poppies TPO13 (1992)
- Aphorisms: Piano Music of Carl Vine, Lindsay Garritson (2000)
- Chamber Music Volume 2, Tall Poppies TP120 (2000)
- Complete Piano Sonatas, Xiaoya Liu, Dynamic CDS 7931 (2002)
- The Complete Symphonies, Sydney Symphony Orchestra, ABC 4767179 (2006)
- The Piano Music: 1990-2006, Michael Kieran Harvey, Tall Poppies TP190 (2007)
- Child's Play, Goldner String Quartet, Piers Lane, Hyperion CDA68521/2 (2026)

== Awards and prizes ==
Year awarded	Awarding body	Award
1970	Australian Society for Music Education Composers' Competition	First Prize (Under 18)
1972	Australian Music Examinations Board	A.Mus.A. (Associate in Music) with distinction – piano
1972	Perth Music Festival	Winner, Open Instrumental Solo Division (piano)
1974	Australian Broadcasting Commission Instrumental & Vocal Competition	W.A. State Division – piano
1976	Australia Council Appointee	Gulbenkian International Choreographic Summer School, Guildford, England
1983	Adams Award	Outstanding Contribution to Music for Dance in Australia
1989	Sounds Australian National Music Critics' Award	Best Instrumental or Ensemble Work, 'Miniature IV'
1990	John Bishop Commission	Symphony No 2 for the Sydney Symphony Orchestra
1993	Australian Guild of Screen Composers Award	Best Music for a Feature Film, Bedevil
1994	Australian Guild of Screen Composers Award	Best Theme for a Television Series, The Battlers
1994	Australian Guild of Screen Composers Award	Best Original Song, The Battlers – 'Love Me Sweet'
2000	Australian Commonwealth Government	Centenary Medal for Contribution to Australian Society
2002	APRA-AMC Classical Music Awards	Best Instrumental Work, Piano Sonata No 1
2005	APRA-AMC Classical Music Awards	Best Performance of an Australian Composition, Sydney Symphony Orchestra and Steven Isserlis playing Cello Concerto
2005	Australia Council for the Arts	Don Banks Award for Outstanding Contribution to Australian Music
2009	APRA-AMC Classical Music Awards	Best Performance of an Australian Composition, West Australian Symphony Orchestra playing Symphony No 7
2010	University of Western Australia	Honorary Degree of Doctor of Music
2012	Collegiate of Specialist Music Educators	Honorary Fellow, for outstanding contribution to music education
2014	Governor-General of the Commonwealth of Australia	Officer of The Order of Australia (AO)
2018	APRA-AMC Classical Music Awards	Award for Excellence by an Individual
2019	APRA-AMC Classical Music Awards	Award for Orchestral Work of the Year: Implacable Gifts

=== ARIA Music Awards ===
The ARIA Music Awards is an annual awards ceremony that recognises excellence, innovation, and achievement across all genres of Australian music. They commenced in 1987.

Year	Nominee / work	Award	Result	Ref.
1994	Bedevil	Best Original Soundtrack, Cast or Show Album	Nominated	

=== Bernard Heinze Memorial Award ===
The Sir Bernard Heinze Memorial Award is given to a person who has made an outstanding contribution to music in Australia.

Year	Nominee / work	Award	Result	Ref.
2011	Carl Vine	Sir Bernard Heinze Memorial Award	awarded	

=== Don Banks Music Award ===
The Don Banks Music Award was established in 1984 to publicly honour a senior artist of high distinction who has made an outstanding and sustained contribution to music in Australia. It was founded by the Australia Council in honour of Don Banks, Australian composer, performer and the first chair of its music board.

Year	Nominee / work	Award	Result
2005	Carl Vine	Don Banks Music Award	awarded
