= Woden Valley Youth Choir =

Australian youth choir

Woden Valley Youth Choir is an audition based children's choir located in Canberra, Australian Capital Territory. It performs not only in Canberra, but also across Australia and internationally during regular tours. The name derives from the Woden Valley district of Canberra.

There are six choirs, within the organisation, catering for different ages and voice ranges:

- Leonis Voices (for ages 7 to 12)
- Australis Voices (for ages 12 to 25)
- Centauri Voices (for youth with low and transitioning voices)
- Pegasi Vocal Ensemble (for ages 10 to 12)
- Spectra Vocal Ensemble (for ages 12 to 25)

These groups replace the former Junior (7-9 Years), Intermediate (9-11 years) and Performing choirs (11-21 years.) The Performing choir was the main group which would perform at all of the major events and concerts the choir was asked to sing at, as well as the group that would tour. The Junior and Intermediate choirs were more aimed at being development groups, occasionally performing at much smaller events such as local church concerts or as entertainment at nursing homes. Nowadays, all groups get equal opportunity to perform.

The Artistic Director of the choir and conductor of Australis Voices is local musician and composer Olivia Swift, who along with WVYC conducts many choirs throughout Canberra, including Kompactus Youth Choir and CHOIR Canberra. Jade McFaul (Leonis), and Lucus Allerton (Centauri) are also conductors for the choir. Previous conductors have included Lucy Bermingham, Rachel Campbell, Veronica Moore and Sally McRae.

One of the choir's biggest changes is the introduction of a group for young men, as previously, boys whose voices were transitioning from soprano and alto to tenor and bass were notably excluded and asked to leave the choir. The choir's third artistic director Kimberley Steele, who set up the group, described the group as a "safe space to sing together" as "A lot of choirs are just treble choirs." Centauri Voices is also notable for being one of the few vocal ensembles in the ACT specifically for younger boys.

== History ==
The Woden Valley Youth Choir began in February 1969 when conductor, Don Whitbread, and his pianist wife, Barbara, soon after they moved to Canberra, issued an invitation to local children. Beginning with twenty-two singers, the Choir grew to a regular membership of 70.

Memorable performances have included:

- 1982 Commonwealth Games in Brisbane, Queensland - performing for Queen Elizabeth II and the Duke of Edinburgh at a Gala Concert;
- for the royals again, in Canberra in 1992;
- at the invitation of the Prime Minister of Australia, to sing to visiting Heads of Government at international conferences in 1981 and 1983;
- as invited guest artists at Government House, Canberra, the residence of the Governor-General of Australia;
- at the opening ceremony of the World Cup Athletics meet in 1985;
- in 1988:
  - a world-wide telecast which launched Australia's Bicentennial year in 1988;
  - 12 choir members were in the Choir which sang at the official opening of Australian Parliament House;
  - at Australia's official flag-raising ceremony at Expo 88 in Brisbane;
  - at the prestigious International Society for Music Education (ISME) Conference;
- at the ceremony for the conferring of the Honorary Degree of Doctor of Laws on Nelson Mandela in 2000.
- at the opening of the Australian of the Year Walk in 2006.
- the opening of the Pacific School Games in 2008.
- as guest artists at the Male Choir Association of Australia 2008 Festival.
- at the Prime Minister's apology to Forgotten Australians and Child Migrants in 2009.
- at the renaming ceremony of Queen Elizabeth Terrace, Canberra in 2012, in which King Charles and Queen Camilla were in attendance.
- singing with Opera Australia, symphony orchestras, and at major concerts with international guest artists; including with Opera Australia’s The Magic Flute in 2014 and The Marriage of Figaro in 2016.
- recording six albums and a one-hour television special;
- Voices in the Forest, a former opera music festival held at the National Arboretum .
- many Canberra International Music Festivals
- the annual concert held every year at various locations around Canberra such as Canberra Grammar School, Canberra College and Wesley Music Centre, where many world premieres of pieces commissioned for the choir are held, previous examples include: 'Growing Into Me' by Sally Whitwell, 'Hawkesbury' by stephen Leek and 'Just Clowning Around' by Lucy Bermingham.
- Albert Hall was used for the 50th anniversary annual concert
- six overseas tours
- The annual Carol By Candlelight community carols, which the choir has been running for many years along with The Canberra City Band.
- the singing of the Australian National Anthem in the Aboriginal Ngunnawal language
- singing for the Queen's 70th Jubilee torch lighting with Prime Minister Anthony Albanese

In 1996, Don Whitbread AOM retired as president and musical director of the choir. He was named Canberra Citizen of the Year for 1997.

In 2009, the choir celebrated its 40th anniversary with a concert at Llewellyn Hall including alumni and featuring two world premiers-Paul Jarman's 'Source of Life' and 'Fortyssimo' by Michelle Leonard and Sally Whitwell.

In 2010, the choir toured South Korea, hosted by the World Vision Korean Children's Choir.

At the end of 2016, Alpha Gregory stood down as Artistic Director after 20 years. Local musician and conductor, Kimberley Steele, became the choir's third Artistic Director on 1 January 2017. In August 2018, Olivia Swift became Artistic Director.

In 2019 Woden Valley Youth Choir celebrated its 50th anniversary.

In January 2026, Music for Canberra (home of the Canberra Youth Orchestra and the Canberra Children's Choir, among others) and Woden Valley Youth Choir announced a partnership with Music for Canberra taking over the stewardship of the Woden Valley Youth Choir.

== Commissioned pieces ==
The choir has had many pieces commissioned for them, some of which have become famous Australian choral works. Some of the commissioned pieces include:

- Never Too Small- Alex Turley (2020)
- Australian Proverb- B. Robinson (2015)
- Hawkesbury- Stephen Leek (2014)
- Growing Into Me- Sally Whitwell (2014)
- Just Clowning Around- Lucy Bermingham (2013)
- Phonograph- Dan Walker (2013)
- Source of Life- Paul Jarman (2009)
- Fortyssimo- Michelle Leonard and Sally Whitwell (2009)
- Pemulwuy- Paul Jarman (2006)

== Discography ==
The Choir can be heard on:

- I Hate Music (Collection of annual concert recordings 2013-2015)
- There's Nothing Like a Song (Live) (2010)
- Fortyssimo! Live (2009)
- Joyful Days (2007)
- Ancient Cries (2006)
- Holiday Lights
- Shine On Me (2002)
- Listen to the Angels Shouting (2000)
- The Woden Valley Youth Choir Live (1990)

Other albums:

- Macca on Air - Songs from Australia All Over
- the international Christmas CD, The Children's Gift, in company with the Vienna Boys Choir and other world-renowned choirs.
- Amani Celebration II
