= Great Southern Spirits =

Choral work by Stephen Leek

Great Southern Spirits is an a cappella choral work by Australian composer Stephen Leek for SATB choir. It is in four movements: Wirindji, Mulga, Kondalilla and Uluru. It was first recorded by The Australian Voices, under the direction of Graeme Morton, on their album of the same name in 1994.
