= Ben Macpherson =

Australian conductor

Bennett William Macpherson is an Australian conductor who received a Medal of the Order of Australia in 2002 for his services to music as a conductor and choirmaster.

== Early life ==
Macpherson was originally a student member of the Perth University Choral Society (PUCS) from 1972 to 1978. During this time, he performed a number of roles including president and assistant conductor of PUCS and also Australian Intervarsity Choral Societies Association treasurer. He was later a member of SUMS before becoming a musical director and conductor in 1983.

== Middle years ==
Macpherson was the conductor of the Sydney University Musical Society (SUMS) for 23 years until his retirement in May 2006. He was SUMS' second longest serving musical director by two and a half years. His final concert with SUMS was a production of Felix Mendelssohn's Elijah performed in collaboration with the Sydney University Symphony Orchestra. Macpherson conducted the choir in ventures such as Carl Orff's Carmina Burana, Rachmaninoff's Vespers, Giacomo Puccini's Messa de Gloria, Mozart's Große Messe, Hector Berlioz's Te Deum, Anton Bruckner's Te Deum, and nearly half of SUMS' 49 Annual Festival of Carols (Carolfest). Macpherson also led the choir in collaboration with works with other arts organisations including the SBS Radio and Television Youth Orchestra, Sydney Philharmonia Choirs, Sydney Gay and Lesbian Choir (SGLC), Sydney Youth Orchestra, Harvard Glee Club, and numerous school choirs.

== Awards ==
Macpherson was awarded the Medal of the Order of Australia in the General Division during the 2002 Australia Day honours. This award was in recognition of his dedication to choral music within Australia, primarily through his involvement in the Australian Intervarsity Choral Societies Association (AICSA) and in SUMS. In 2002, Macpherson was chorus master of the Sydney Intervarsity Choral Festival. His award was announced on 23 January to the festival choir ahead of the actual award ceremony on Australia Day (26 January). Macpherson has chorus mastered and/or conducted numerous Intervarsity Choral Festivals (Canberra '89, Melbourne '91, Sydney '95, Perth '97, Melbourne '98 and Sydney '02) and has been a constant figure in the recent history of the AICSA movement.

== Other arts organisations ==
Aside from his contributions to both SUMS and AICSA, Macpherson has been involved in many other arts organisations. He has been a member of the Sydney Chamber Choir, the Opera Australia Chorus and Cantillation. He has acted as chorus master for Sydney Philharmonia Choirs. Macpherson, as an accomplished orchestral conductor, has conducted the Taverner Consort of Voices, the Sydney Chamber Choir, the Sydney University Symphony Orchestra, the SBS Radio and Television Youth Orchestra, the Sydney Youth Orchestra, and the Orange Regional Conservatorium .
