= The Australian Voices =

Choir

The Australian Voices are a national choir of young adult Australian singers directed by John Rotar and produced by Scott Griffin. The choir is prominent promoters and performers of Australian choral music, commissioning a number of works in their distinctive A cappella style. The choir has performed concerts throughout Australia, Europe, the United States, Central America, Canada, and Asia. They have also performed for Australian Broadcasting Corporation radio live concerts, appeared at major concerts for festivals and events, and produced CDs and kits on creative choral singing.

== History ==
=== 1993–2009 ===
The choir was founded in 1993 by Graeme Morton and Stephen Leek to promote Australian choral composition with both existing and new works.

Graeme Morton was artistic director and conductor from 1993 to 1996. During this time, they released 4 albums, which their debut album "Great Southern Spirits" (which included Leek's piece of the same name) won the Sunnie Award for Best Classical Recording. They were also invited to perform in 1996 as the official Australian Choir at the 4th World Symposium on Choral Music, held in Sydney.

Stephen Leek was artistic director and conductor of the group from 1996 to 2009. Under his tenure, they traveled internationally and performed at international choral competitions and Eisteddfods, as well as perform at regional concerts and festivals. They also released five albums. Their accolades during this time included:

- 'Best Performance' and other major prizes at the 1998 Béla Bartók International Choral Competition in Hungary,
- First prize in the Youth Choir Category, First Prize in the Chamber Choir Category and finalists in the Choir of the World Competition at the 2001 International Eisteddfod in Llangollen, Wales,
- Two gold medals at the 2006 World Choir Games in Xiamen, China, and
- Won the 2008 Australian Music Centre award for Outstanding Contribution to Australian Music in a Regional Area.

=== 2010–2021 ===
Gordon Hamilton was artistic director and conductor between 2009-2021. Under his tenure, they have continued to perform at choral events, eisteddfods and concerts, but also release online recordings and behind the scenes videos on YouTube and Facebook.

Their first online releases were around the theme that Hamilton described as the "juxtaposition of things that don't belong together". Their first online release was Toy Story 3 = Awesome! (The Facebook Song) a piece composed by Hamilton which takes a series of Facebook status updates and connects them in song. One year later, they released their song Tra$h Ma$h, which takes over 30 pop songs and mashes them together in the style of Michael Tippett. In December 2012, they released Initialise, which contrasts different three letter acronyms. In February 2013, they release their last song in the theme, called 9 Cutest Things That Ever Happened, which was based upon a BuzzFeed article on cute images. Also during this time, they presented their choral-theatre show, MOON: an epic song of love, across Australia in 2011, and at the 2012 Edinburgh Fringe Festival. The piece got Hamilton his first Work of the Year nomination at the Australian Music Centre's Art Music Awards in 2014.

An anthology of their songs were released with sheet music in 2012 by Edition Peters.

Between 2012 and 2016, they collaborated with Rob Davidson and Queensland-based quintet Topology to create, perform and record The Singing Politician, an anthology of songs based upon musicalisations of historical Australian Prime Minister speeches. Of particular note in the anthology was their song Not Now, Not Ever! (2014), which was based on then prime minister's Julia Gillard's 2012 Misogyny Speech, and The reward for public life (2014) based upon Noel Pearson's eulogy at the state memorial service for Gough Whitlam, which was premiered live on the Australian talk show Q+A in Pearson's presence.

In 2016, they released their own album, Reverie, with ABC Classics, presenting their other Australian commissions.

The album Elsewhere was released in 2019. In 2020, they announced 22 new choral commissions for established and emerging Australian composers to be performed in the future.

In August 2021, Hamilton announced that he would step down from the role of artistic director and conductor. He cited difficulties during the COVID-19 pandemic, including being stranded in Germany for an extended period of time, the inability to return to Australia, and since finding work and opportunities in Germany.

=== 2021–present ===
Brisbane based composer, John Rotar, joined as artistic director in October 2021. in 2024, the albums Far and Near and Painted in Dirt were released, including pieces by Rotar.

== Discography ==
CD releases include:

- Great Southern Spirits
- The Listening Land
- Sing My Soul
- A Millennium of Choral Composition
- Ngana
- Voices Live
- Sea Children
- Between Two Horizons
- Summer Star
- The Australian Voices
- The Singing Politician (with Topology)
- Reverie
- Elsewhere
- Far and Near (2024)
- Painted in Dirt (2024)
