= Rites of Passage (Sculthorpe) =

Rites of Passage is a music theatre work written by the Australian composer Peter Sculthorpe in 1972–73. It is often categorised as an opera, but it does not conform to the traditional concept of opera. It is written for dancers depicting the ritual of initiation of the Aranda people, an indigenous tribe; double SATB chorus singing words from Boethius and others; three percussionists, two tubas, piano (echoed), six cellos and four double basses; but no parts for individual singers. Sculthorpe drew on the approach espoused by Jean-Baptiste Lully, in which dance, drama and music are not separated.

It was commissioned by The Australian Opera for the opening of the Sydney Opera House in October 1973, but it was not ready on time so Sergei Prokofiev's War and Peace was instead staged as the inaugural operatic production at the Opera House.

The delay was brought about partly by difficulties Sculthorpe experienced with the Opera House management, but most particularly in settling on a suitable libretto. He worked with seven writers before finally deciding to write the libretto himself. He wrote most of the work in England, while he was Visiting Professor at the University of Sussex.

The text uses words from Boethius's The Consolation of Philosophy, and also incorporates aboriginal, Ghanaian, and Tibetan chants. The libretto is influenced by Arnold van Gennep's anthropological study of an individual's social transitions. It is written in Latin and one of the dialects of Arrernte, an Australian Aboriginal dialect cluster from the Northern Territory. The music involves what Sculthorpe calls the Kepler motif, an alternation of the notes G and A-flat, which he has also employed in other works about the Earth.

Rites of Passage was first performed at the Sydney Opera House on 27 September 1974. The Australian Opera Chorus, Australian Dance Theatre under their director Jaap Flier, and the Australian Elizabethan Trust Sydney Orchestra were all led by John Hopkins. Sculthorpe was in attendance, and received both cheers and boos. The work itself received mixed reviews, headed by such disparate lines as "Boring Rites guilty of all that is wrong" and "New opera was great success".

After its initial production, the work has been revived twice:

- 12 September 1975: at Dallas Brooks Hall, Melbourne, by the Melbourne Chorale and the Victorian College of the Arts Orchestra
- 8 May 2009: as part of the Canberra International Music Festival and in honour of Sculthorpe's 80th birthday; at the Fitter's Workshop, Kingston, Canberra, with the ANU School of Music Contemporary Music Ensemble; the Oriana Chorale; Roland Peelman; Synergy Percussion with Michael Askill; and the involvement of the composer.

Excerpts from the work have been recorded. The Victorian College of the Arts Orchestra and the Melbourne Chorale Continuing Choir were conducted by John Hopkins.

Sculthorpe's Lament (1976/91) borrowed material from Rites of Passage.
