= Sydney University Symphony Orchestra =

Symphony orchestra in Australia

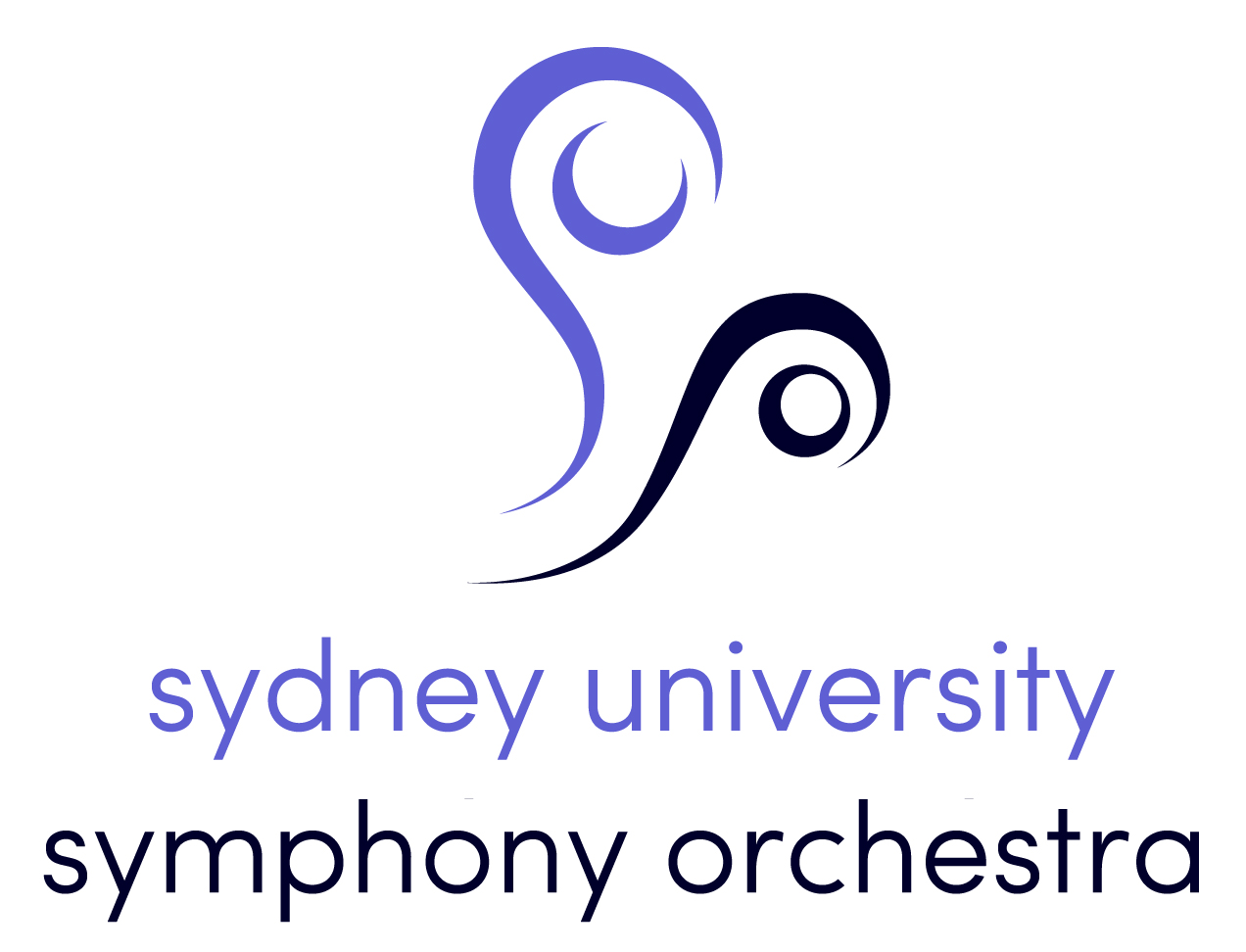
- Founded: 1948
- Location: University of Sydney
- Concert hall: Great Hall of the University of Sydney
- Principal conductor: Luke Spicer
- Website: suso.org.au

The Sydney University Symphony Orchestra (SUSO) is the premier orchestra on the main campus of the University of Sydney.

== History ==
Sydney University Symphony Orchestra was founded in 1948 by Donald Peart, and was known as the Pro Musica Orchestra until 1990. It is currently made up of around 80 musicians from all faculties across the university. The orchestra's home venue is the neo-gothic Great Hall in the university's sandstone Quadrangle. The orchestra is currently conducted by Luke Spicer.

SUSO is part of the University of Sydney Union's Clubs & Societies program and is run by a committee of twelve students. It receives funding from the University of Sydney Union as well as donations from the public. The current president is Julian van Gerwen (French horn) and vice-president is Marcus Paxton (flute).

Their concert season features four concerts each year, and, through a long-standing connection with the university's Arts Unit, the orchestra has been privileged to perform works by leading Australian composers, including Anne Boyd, Ross Edwards, Peter Sculthorpe, Matthew Hindson and Gordon Hamilton.

In the past, SUSO has also performed with well known soloists, including Gershwin's Rhapsody in Blue with Kathryn Selby, Beethoven's Piano Concerto No. 1 with Gerard Willems, Dvořák's Cello Concerto with Timo-Veikko Valve, Richard Strauss' Horn Concerto No. 1 with Julian Leslie, Max Bruch's Violin Concerto No. 1 (Bruch) with Katherine Lukey, and Robert Schumann's Konzertstück for Four Horns and Orchestra, Op. 86, with Robert Johnson, Andrew London, Jack Stephens and Lotti Ropert.

Previous conductors include Simon Kenway, Nicholas Routley, Simon Thew, Ben Macpherson OAM, Romano Crevici, Phillip Chu, Gareth Tilley, Colin Piper and George Ellis.

== Previous concerts ==
In 2006, SUSO performed with the Sydney University Musical Society (SUMS) for Ben Macpherson's farewell concert. It featured Mendelssohn's Elijah and was broadcast on 2MBS.

In 2009, SUSO again collaborated with SUMS to perform Carl Orff's Carmina Burana.

In 2011, SUSO provided orchestral accompaniment to The Church for the band's thirtieth anniversary concert, "A Psychedelic Symphony", at the Sydney Opera House.

In 2012 SUSO combined with the University of New South Wales Symphony Orchestra to perform Mahler's Symphony No. 1.

In 2014, SUSO joined forces with the Sydney University Musical Society (SUMS) and the Sydney University Wind Orchestra (SUWO) to present the University of Sydney Union Music Showcase in the Great Hall. This event was the first of its kind, in which all three of the university's premier musical ensembles presented a joint concert. In this concert, SUSO performed Beethoven's Coriolan Overture, Gabriel Fauré's Pavane, Matthew Hindson's RPM and Hector Berlioz's "Marche au supplice".

In 2015, SUSO reprised Mendelssohn's Elijah, again as a collaboration with SUMS performed at the Verbrugghen Concert Hall.

In 2016, SUSO performed Saint-Saëns' Symphony No. 3 "avec orgue" at the University of Sydney Great Hall, featuring Rudolf von Beckerath's 1972 organ.

In 2017, SUSO opened their season with Anton Bruckner's Symphony No. 4 at Christ Church St Laurence, and, in June that year, commissioned a work from Australian composer Gordon Hamilton, premiering Age of the Universe in the second concert. Along with other works such as Dvořák's Slavonic Dances, Tchaikovsky's Symphony No. 5 and Richard Wagner's Overture to Rienzi, the year also included the young emerging composer Nicholas D'Silva's new work Lux Aeterna, which the orchestra premiered in their highlight concert in October. This concert featured combined performances with Sydney University Musical Society, culminating in Beethoven's Symphony No. 9 "Choral" at Verbrugghen Hall.

In 2018, SUSO collaborated with the University of Sydney to present the World War I centenary performance of Karl Jenkins' The Armed Man. Alongside this end-of-year concert, SUSO performed throughout the year, with works such as Smetana's "Moldau" from Má vlast, Dvořák's Symphony No. 7, Tchaikovsky's Piano Concerto No. 1 with Clemens Leske, Sibelius' Symphony No. 3, Beethoven's Symphony No. 8 and Shostakovich's Cello Concerto No. 1 with Kenichi Mizushima.

In 2019, SUSO combined with Pacific Opera to perform Humperdinck's Hansel and Gretel, and with Katherine Lukey to perform Max Bruch's Violin Concerto No. 1. Throughout the year, SUSO also performed works such as Vaughan Williams' A London Symphony, Paul Dukas' The Sorcerer's Apprentice and Dvořák's New World Symphony.

After a disrupted and downscaled 2020 season as a result of the COVID-19 pandemic, SUSO managed one full-scale concert in 2021 – an opera gala held in conjunction with the Sydney Conservatorium Opera Department, performed in Verbrugghen Hall conducted by Stephen Mould.

SUSO's planned season for 2022 includes collaborating with Russian conductor Natalia Raspopova as a soloist in Beethoven's Piano Concerto No. 3, Respighi's Pines of Rome, and a reprise of Saint-Saëns' Symphony No. 3 "Organ Symphony".
