= Sydney University Musical Society =

Australian university choir

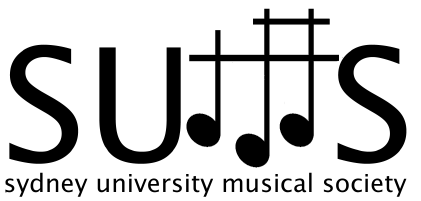
- Abbreviation: SUMS
- Formation: 1878
- Type: University Choir
- Location: The University of Sydney
- Region served: Sydney, Australia
- Current Conductor: Michael Bradshaw
- Current President: Esha-Lee Dalwood
- Current Secretary: Dean Imrie
- Current Treasurer: Elliot Lombard
- Website: sums.aicsa.org.au

The Sydney University Musical Society (SUMS) is an undergraduate choral society at the University of Sydney. Founded in 1878, it is one of the oldest secular choirs in Australia, and the oldest Australian University Choir.

SUMS has performed many great works over its lifetime, including the Australian premiere performances Bach's Mass in B minor and St Matthew Passion in 1880; premiere performances of Martin and Peter Wesley Smith's Songs of Australia for the Australian Bicentenary in 1988, the world premiere of Nicholas Routley's Mycenae Lookout in 1998, and world premiere of Anne Boyd's carol, A Lullaby of the Nativity, written for SUMS in 2003. The Musical Society has performed with orchestras such as the Sydney Symphony Orchestra, the Sydney Youth Orchestra and the SBS Youth Orchestra. SUMS' conductor of 23 years, Ben Macpherson, retired from his post of musical director in mid-2006, with his final performance with the society being Mendelssohn's Elijah, performed in the Great Hall of the University of Sydney.

In 2015, SUMS also hosted the 66th Annual Intervarsity Festival, delivering an astounding performance of Verdi's Messa da Requiem. Outside of rehearsals and performances, SUMS regularly hosts events for its members as well, including picnics, trivia nights at the pub, camps, and the annual Academic Dinner.

== Recent SUMS Performances ==
Year	Program
2010	Mozart's Great Mass in C minor
2010	Fauré's Requiem
2011	Duruflé's Requiem
2012	Verdi's Requiem ^{∞}
2013	J.S. Bach's Magnificat in D major
2013	Vivaldi's Gloria
2014	Vivaldi's Magnificat
2014	Karl Jenkins' Stella Natalis
2015	Mendelssohn's Elijah ^{†}
2015	Vaughan Williams' Mass in G minor
2016	Gustav Mahler's Symphony No. 2 the Resurrection Symphony
2017	Edward Elgar's The Dream of Gerontius, Op. 38 ^{∞}
2017	Beethoven's Symphony No. 9 in D minor, Op. 125 ^{†}
2018	Sergei Prokofiev's Alexander Nevsky cantata ^{∞}
2018	Paul Stanhope's The Land is Healed. Ban.garay!
2018	Henry Purcell's Ode to St. Cecilia

∞ Collaborate with Sydney Conservatorium of Music Symphony Orchestra, Choir and Chamber Choir

† Collaborate with Sydney University Symphony Orchestra

== See also ==
Australian Intervarsity Choral Societies Association
