= Northern Spirit =

Northern Spirit may refer to:

- Arriva Trains Northern, a former train operating company in England that operated as Northern Spirit between 1998 and 2001
- Northern Brave (women's cricket), a women's team in New Zealand known as Northern Spirit until 2021
- Northern Spirit F.C., a football club in the National Soccer League, Australia between 1998 and 2004; predecessor of Gladesville Hornsby Football Association Spirit FC
- Northern Spirit (Kammerchor), a chamber choir based in Bremen, Germany
- Northern Spirit Radio, an organization founded in Eau Claire, Wisconsin by Mark Helpsmeet that creates radio programs
- Northern Spirits, former name of a passenger train operated by Via Rail between Winnipeg and Churchill, Manitoba
