= Canberra Children's Choir =

Australian children's choir

The Canberra Children's Choir (CCC) is a choir of children established in 1967 in Canberra, Australia. It mainly comprises musicians aged 6 to 16.

== History ==
The Canberra Children's Choir was established in 1967 with 35 children by Judith Clingan. The Canberra Children's Choir was one of the key ensembles in Music for Everyone. Music for Everyone merged with Canberra Youth Music (the umbrella organisation for the Canberra Youth Orchestra) to form Music for Canberra in 2015, and is also home to the Canberra Youth Orchestra.

In January 2026, Music for Canberra and Woden Valley Youth Choir announced a partnership with Music for Canberra taking over the stewardship of the Woden Valley Youth Choir.

== Past conductors ==
- Judith Clingan
- Gillian Bonham
- Mary Tatchell
- Greta Claringbould
- Tobias Cole

== Discography ==
- The Christmas Story narrated by Alastair Duncan

== Alumni ==
- Stephen Leek
- Christopher Lincoln Bogg
- Padma Newsome
- Geoffrey Badger

== Performances and collaborations ==
- Opera Australia's Carmen 2021

== World premiers performed by the Canberra Children's Choir ==
- A Canticle of Light by Judith Clingan (1976)
- St Luke Magnificat by Douglas Knehans (June 9, 1987)
