= Canberra Choral Society =

Choir in Canberra

- Choir
- Logo
- Origin: Canberra, Australia
- Founded: 1952
- Genre: traditional and contemporary choral music
- Members: 90
- Choir admission: By audition
- Website: canberrachoralsociety.org

The Canberra Choral Society (CCS) is an auditioned symphonic choir in Canberra, Australia. The choir is known both for traditional choral repertoire, and new music.

A key focus for the choir is an annual "Come and Sing" program, in which up to 120 unauditioned guest singers rehearse with the choir and perform a major work in ANU Llewellyn Hall with professional soloists and orchestra.

== History ==
The Canberra Choral Society originated in 1952 as the Canberra Choral Group with a small group of people who began singing together for their own pleasure and musical advancement. Conductors originally included Ronald Penny, Peter Bailey and Jane Malone, and the Group was recognised as an important part of the early cultural development of Canberra. The name was changed to the Canberra Choral Society in 1960, and the Society became an officially incorporated association in April 1962. For over sixty years CCS has been a leading player the musical life of the city. Its repertoire includes both traditional and contemporary choral music.

== Repertoire, performances and programs ==
The Society had a proven record of performing new works by Australian composers. With assistance from the Federal Governments' arts funding body, the Australia Council, large-scale choral-orchestral compositions were commissioned by the Society for the Australian Bicentenary in 1988 (Richard Mills's Five Meditations from the Poetry of David Campbell) and for the Centenary of Federation in 2001 (Peter and Martin Wesley-Smith's Black Ribbon). Premiere performances of works by resident musical directors have also been a feature of the choir's repertoire.

The Society has performed at the Australian National University, the 2000 Summer Olympics Arts Festival, ABC TV and Radio, the Canberra International Music Festival, the opening of the new Australian Parliament House, the 50th Anniversary of World War II, the Australian National University's 50th anniversary, and the 25th anniversary of the opening of the Sydney Opera House. The Society has performed with many Canberra based choirs, the Canberra Symphony Orchestra, Melbourne Symphony Orchestra, Sydney Symphony Orchestra, the National Capital Orchestra and the Canberra Youth Orchestra.

The Society regularly contributed to community events. It has performed at the Canberra Multicultural Festival and during Floriade, and on special occasions such as the opening of Parliament House. For many years, the Society provided the choir for the annual Anzac Day service held at the Australian War Memorial.

Guest conductors and soloists of national and international repute who have worked with the Society include Nicholas Braithwaite, Joan Carden, Margreta Elkins, Gerald English, Donald Shanks, Clifford Grant and Tobias Cole.

Canberra Choral Society was critical in developing a national Choral Music Lending Scheme that facilitates provision of performing scores to over 100 member choirs across the country and which was instituted in 1965.

For their 2015 performance of Handel's Messiah, Jennifer Gall of The Canberra Times praised the society for "creating a concert that was inclusive of new singers and satisfying for the audience."

== Musical directors ==
- 1952–1957 Ronald Penny
- 1958–1961 Jane Malone
- 1962–1972 Wilfrid Holland
- 1972–1976 Ayis Ioannides
- 1976–1985 Donald Hollier
- 1985–1989 Hans Günter Mommer
- 1989–1993 Christopher Lyndon-Gee
- 1994–1999 Robyn Holmes
- 2000–2001 Piroska Varga
- 2001 Christoph Moor
- 2002–2003 Thomas Burge
- 2003 John Gilbert (Acting)
- 2004–2005 Judith Clingan
- 2006–2010 Peter Pocock
- 2011–2016 Tobias Cole
- 2017 Dianna Nixon
- 2018–Present Dan Walker
