= When the World as You've Known It Doesn't Exist =

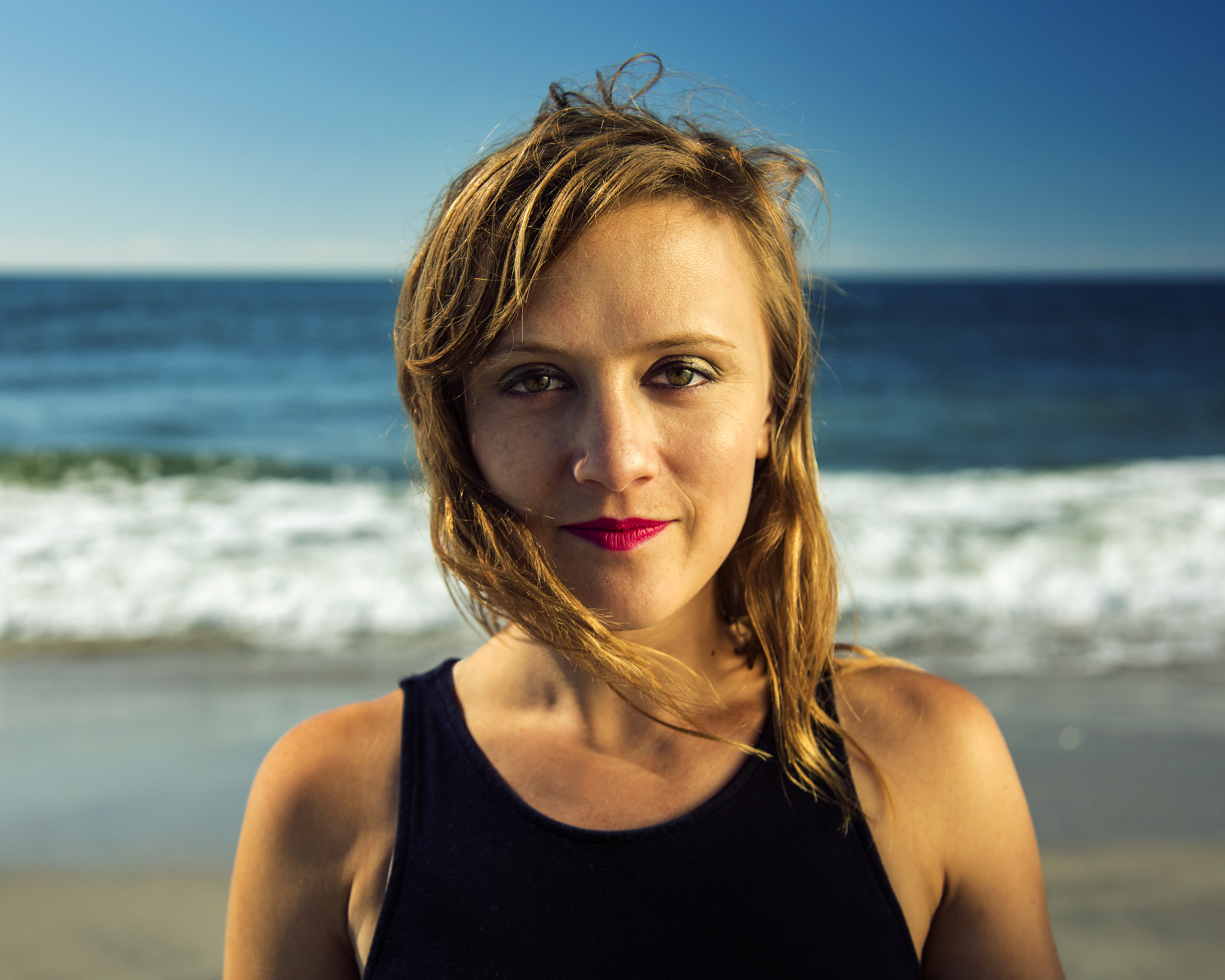
Ellen Reid in 2016

When the World as You've Known It Doesn't Exist is a composition for three sopranos and orchestra by the American composer Ellen Reid. The work was commissioned by the New York Philharmonic as part of its "Project 19," an initiative commissioning new works by 19 female composers in honor of the centennial of the ratification of the Nineteenth Amendment to the United States Constitution. It was first performed by the sopranos Eliza Bagg, Martha Cluver, and Estelí Gomez and the New York Philharmonic under the direction of Jaap van Zweden at David Geffen Hall on February 20, 2020. It has been subsequently performed to popular acclaim by major American orchestras including the Boston Symphony Orchestra in 2022 with Anna Rakitina conducting, and at the Tanglewood Music Center in 2025 with Leonard Weiss conducting.

== Composition ==
When the World as You've Known It Doesn't Exist is cast in a single movement and has a performance duration of roughly ten minutes.

=== Instrumentation ===
The work is scored for three sopranos performing wordless vocalizations and a large orchestra consisting of three flutes (one doubling piccolo), three oboes, three clarinets, two bassoons, contrabassoon, four horns, three trumpets, three trombones, tuba, percussion (bass drum, snare drum, cymbals, tam-tam, tomtoms, vibraphone, suspended cymbal), piano, and strings.

== Reception ==
Reviewing the world premiere, John Rockwell of the Financial Times described When the World as You've Known It Doesn't Exist as "a gorgeous piece," writing, "Highly personal and not explicitly political, the 11-minute piece offers shimmering sonorities for a full orchestra and three vocalising women." Anthony Tommasini of The New York Times similarly remarked, "The opening of her new piece came across as a wash of alluring sounds, effects and colors, with high-pitched strings, fluttering winds and softly wailing brass bustling along—yet with a jolt of inner tension. The whole sound mass then glides downward and becomes more agitated." He continued, "Suddenly, thematic bits protrude ominously from various instruments, and the violins try to lead the journey into dark terrain with a slinky, elusive melody. The music goes through fitful episodes, with percolating riffs, pummeling percussion and gratingly dissonant clusters. Throughout, three sopranos (Eliza Bagg, Martha Cluver and Estelí Gomez) sing wordless lyrical fragments and soft sonorities, lending an eerily angelic touch."
