= Full Fathom Five (band) =

- Also known as: FF5
- Origin: Brisbane, Queensland, Australia
- Genres: Rock; electronica
- Labels: Valve; Warner
- Past members: Tam Patton; Josh Thomson; Robert Mynard; Ian Thompson; Sam Korman; Ben Thomson; James Capt; Christian Ronquillo

Full Fathom Five, also referred to as FF5, are an Australian rock and electronica band formed in Brisbane, Queensland. They were one described as "Chemical Brothers on valium." They released a four-track extended play, Friend of Faux, on 1 May 2000. It was followed in December by their single, "Who's Your Daddy", which was placed on high rotation by national youth radio, Triple J.

They started recording their debut album, 07 Seven, in 2000 and released it in August 2001 via Valve Records, distributed by Warner. Derrin Cason of BrisPop observed, "a well-constructed stylish piece of work, flowing from one style to another effortlessly... the sounds they make can get your head screwed with or your feet bounding off the dance floor. In other words, hear them live or in surround sound, it is definitely an uplifting experience."

In addition to their own albums, Full Fathom Five have recorded and performed with post-classical quintet Topology producing the critically acclaimed album Future Tense, and have been commissioned to remix many Australian artists such as Paul Kelly, David Bridie, Sunk Loto, Screamfeeder, and Tulipan. Collaborations with local visual artists have produced award-winning film clips, powerful stage performances and highly collectable street press and poster art. During Full Fathom Five's earlier years a lot of their supplied press photography was in the form of substituted photos featuring collections of five or more people, usually old Russian or eastern European photographs and much of their poster art was inspired by early propaganda or futurist imagery.

Its members have included Tam Patton on decks, turntables, guitar and synthesisers, Josh Thomson on keyboards, Robert Mynard on bass guitar, Ian Thompson on guitar, samples and synthesisers, Sam Korman on samples, synthesisers and vocals, Ben Thomson on bass guitar, vocals, guitars and keyboards, James Capt on drums and percussion and Christian Ronquillo. Full Fathom Five is signed to Brisbane label Valve Records. The band's name is taken rom a line in The Tempest by Shakespeare.

== Releases ==
=== Albums ===
- 07 Seven (13 August 2001) Valve Records/Warner (WAR 8573899392)
  1. Ready Light
  2. 5 Minutes from Machine
  3. Anxiety
  4. One Small Step
  5. ...
  6. Going Equipped
  7. Eternal Struggle
  8. So Now You're Paul Simon's Producer
  9. Gumbo
  10. Auf Wiedersehn
  11. Who's Your Daddy?
  12. Moreton Roller
- Sides (2003)
  1. Built You a Gun
  2. Sides
  3. Desert
  4. The Sea
  5. Riding Falling Elevators
  6. Bringing Down the Champion
  7. Casino
  8. Wire Loop
  9. Four & Twenty
  10. Perfect Landing
- Future Tense (with Topology) (2004)
  1. OutInOut
  2. FF5-1 (5 Notes)
  3. Killing Music
  4. Going Equipped
  5. Between Stations
  6. John Brown
  7. Stress Positions
  8. 5 Minutes from Machine
  9. Bad People Have Parties Too
  10. The Mystical Forms of War
  11. Spiral Coda

=== Extended plays ===
- Friend or Faux (1 May 2000) Valve Records

=== Singles ===
- "Who's Your Daddy?" (December 2000) Valve Records
