= Dulcie Holland =

Australian composer (1913–2000)

Dulcie Sybil Holland AM
- Born: 5 January 1913; Sydney, Australia
- Died: 21 May 2000 (aged 87); Sydney, Australia
- Occupations: Composer, teacher, performer

Dulcie Sybil Holland (Note: Also known by her married name as Dulcie Bellhouse or Mrs Dulcie Sybil Bellhouse.) AM (5 January 1913 – 21 May 2000) was an Australian composer and music educator. Best known for her contributions to music education through her involvement with the Australian Music Examinations Board, Holland has in recent decades gained greater recognition as a composer. She is now regarded by some critics as one of the more significant Australian composers of her generation.

== Education ==
Holland was born in Sydney in 1913. She began taking piano lessons at the age of six, and attended Shirley School for Girls, known for its academic excellence. In 1929 she entered the New South Wales Conservatorium of Music (now the Sydney Conservatorium) to continue her studies. At the Conservatorium she studied piano with Grace Middenway and Frank Hutchens, cello with Gladstone Bell, and composition with Roy Agnew and Alfred Hill, eventually completing both the Diploma course (DSCM) and the Licentiate of the Royal Schools of Music (LRSM) in 1933.

In 1937, Holland travelled to London to study composition at the Royal College of Music with John Ireland. At the end of her first year, she won the Blumenthal Scholarship for composition, which entitled her to another three years of study at the College. The following year she won the Cobbett Prize for chamber music, but with the outbreak of World War II in 1939, decided to return to Australia.

Several years after the war, in 1951, she returned to the United Kingdom for a year to study serialism with Mátyás Seiber.

== Career ==
After returning to Australia from the Royal College in 1939, Holland embarked on a career as a recitalist and freelance composer. In 1940 she married the Australian conductor Alan Bellhouse, with whom she had two children. During the 1940s, in addition to her childrearing and composing, she wrote a number of children's books, under her married name of Dulcie Bellhouse. She also began to write music for the North Shore Symphony Orchestra (founded and conducted by her husband), an association that continued for 25 years.

In the 1950s, Holland was commissioned to write musical scores for the Department of the Interior, which was then producing a number of documentary films about Australian life for the new wave of migrants entering the country. She eventually wrote the scores for forty of these films.

After her retirement from AMEB in 1983, Holland continued to compose, but chose to focus more on the writing of music text books, on the ground that she believed "making new converts to music" to be more important than adding to the volume of existing music.

In 1977, she was made a Member of the Order of Australia (AM). In 1993, along with Miriam Hyde, she was awarded an honorary Doctorate of Letters (D.Litt.) by Macquarie University.

== Music ==
Throughout the course of her seventy-year career, Holland produced a considerable body of serious (as opposed to educational) music. Her work includes orchestral pieces (including a symphony), vocal and choral works, a large output of chamber music featuring different combinations of instruments, and many pieces for piano and other solo performance. She wrote in both the contemporary and neo-classical genres.

=== Style ===
Dulcie Holland has been described as "less conservative and more appealing than many of her contemporaries". Her music is generally "melodic, optimistic and sunny", and even her darker moods are "reflective and lyrical". She employs "non-traditional key relationships and swiftly changing tonal centres", and is "fond of the pentatonic scale with its built-in ambiguities, and the possibilities thus given to modulate to unexpected keys". Overall however, her music is said to convey a "sense of balance, of confidence, of individuality [and] of formal structure".

=== Major works ===
In addition to the symphony and string quartet, Holland's Piano Sonata has been called "undoubtedly a landmark work in the Australian oeuvre", while her 1944 Trio for Violin, Cello and Piano has been described as "one of the greatest treasures of Australian music". Reflecting Holland's difficulty in gaining recognition as a serious composer through much of her lifetime, the latter work did not receive its first public performance until 1991, 47 years after it was first written.

== Resurgence ==
The life and music of Holland has seen a recent resurgence of interest. In June 2020, Dr Rita Crews OAM and Dr Jeanell Carrigan AM published the first comprehensive biography of Holland's life, including a complete catalogue of her works (including unpublished works). The release of this biography also coincided with an album of Holland's works, In Tribute, featuring Carrigan at the piano with Goetz Richter AM on violin and Dr Minah Choe on cello.

In June 2021, Australian pianist Ronan Apcar released his debut album Dulcie Holland Crescent following a research project at the ANU School of Music. The works on this album included unpublished pieces by Holland and pieces previously not commercially available. The world premiere of Holland's Concertino for piano and strings was given by Apcar and conductor Leonard Weiss, with the Canberra Sinfonia, on 19 June 2022.

== Awards ==
- ABC/APRA awards, 1933, 1944, 1951, 1955
- ANZAC Festival Awards, 1954, 1955, 1956
- General Motors Theatre Award, 1963
- Henry Lawson Award, 1965
- Member of the Order of Australia, 1977
- Honorary D.Litt. from Macquarie University, 1993
- AMEB Fellowship in Music, 1994

== Recurring references ==
- Dulcie Holland - Australian Music Centre website.
- Dulcie Holland: Building a Foundation by Rita Crews, Resonate magazine, 18 April 2008
- Fuller, Sophie; LeFanu, Nicola (1994). Reclaiming the Muse. Harwood Academic Publishers. p. 153. ISBN 978-3-7186-5528-1.
- Sitsky, Larry; Martin, Ruth Lee (2005). Australian Piano Music of the Twentieth Century. Greenwood Publishing Group. p. 43. ISBN 978-0-313-32286-0.
