= Tobias Cole =

- Born: 7 August 1971 (age 55); Leiden, Netherlands
- Genres: Opera
- Occupation: Musician
- Instrument: Vocalist

Tobias Martin Piers Trevor Cole (born 7 August 1971) is an Australian countertenor and leading artist with Opera Australia.

== Early life ==
Cole was born in Leiden, Netherlands while his father was working at the Leiden University as a radio astronomer. In 1976 he commenced his education at Newington College. Aged eight, he joined the choir of St. James Church in Sydney, as a treble. As a boy soprano, Cole sang with The Australian Opera (in A Midsummer Night's Dream and Tosca) and with the Sydney Philharmonia Choirs. As a teenager, in 1986/87 Cole toured Europe with the Chapel Choir of Newington College. He was later appointed head chorister of the choir.

== Tertiary education ==
Cole is an honours graduate in music from the University of Sydney, having studied singing, composition, conducting and musicology. He was awarded a 1994 Churchill Fellowship, sponsored by Dame Roma Mitchell, to continue his vocal training with Ashley Stafford at London's Royal College of Music and to also further his studies in Early Music. He later received a Queen's Trust Achiever Award for operatic studies in London. In 2002, he was the first countertenor to win Opera Foundation Australia's Metropolitan Opera Young Artist Study Award and spent three months in New York at the Met.

== Performance career ==
Cole has sung with choirs and vocal ensembles including:

- The Song Company
- The Australian Chamber Singers
- Sydney Chamber Choir
- Choir of St. Paul's Cathedral (London)
- The Llewellyn Choir (Canberra)
- Canberra Choral Society

Cole has performed with companies including:

- Opera Australia – Title role in Giulio Cesare, Eustazio in Rinaldo, Nireno in Cesare and, most recently, as Oberon in A Midsummer Night's Dream
- Queensland Orchestra – St John Passion
- Sydney Philharmonia Choirs – Messiah and Carmina Burana
- Chicago Opera Theater – Oberon in A Midsummer Night's Dream, Apollo in Death in Venice, Ottone in L'incoronazione di Poppea
- West Australian Opera – Medoro in Orlando
- Opera Queensland – Nireno
- English Bach Festival – Fairy Queen
- Queensland Symphony Orchestra and Adelaide Symphony Orchestra – Messiah
- London Handel Festival – Ulisse in Deidamia
- Australian Brandenburg Orchestra – Noel! Noel!
- Pinchgut Opera – Athamas in Semele

== Conducting career ==
- Oriana Chorale, Canberra
- University of Canberra Choir
- Canberra Choral Society
- Canberra Children's Choir
- ANU Chamber Choir

== Recordings ==
- Semele – ABC Classics
- The Renaissance Players – Walsingham Classics
