= Snuff Puppets =

Australian puppet theatre company

Coordinates: 37.7986647°S 144.8879336°E

Snuff Puppet Skullies from Scarey

Snuff Puppets is an Australian puppet theatre company. Founded in 1992, they combine elements of puppetry, live music, visual, and physical theatre to discuss taboo topics and make political satire.

== History ==
Snuff Puppets originated in Canberra as part of Splinters Theatre of Spectacle. They moved to a warehouse in the suburb of Footscray in Melbourne in 1992, and are now based in the historic Footscray Drill Hall. Snuff Puppets was founded by Pauline Cady, Simon Terrill, and the current artistic director Andy Freer. Nick Wilson became Co-Artistic Director in 2023.

Since 1992, Snuff Puppets have roamed the streets, performed hundreds of stages and festival shows, and turned thousands of heads at protests and political rallies.

Snuff Puppets have embarked on more than 40 international tours, with performances in countries including; Austria, Belgium, Brazil, Chile, Denmark, Democratic Republic of the Congo, England, France, Germany, Hong Kong, Hungary, India, Indonesia, Ireland, Italy, Japan, Korea, People’s Republic of China, Peru, Poland, Portugal, Netherlands, New Zealand, Romania, Singapore, Spain, Sweden, Switzerland, Taiwan & Thailand.

They have conducted over 40 giant People's Puppet Project community workshops worldwide.

Maribyrnong City Council support Snuff Puppets with annual operational Funding. Crumpler bags are a decades long supporter of Snuff Puppets tours. Snuff Puppets is a registered charity. Two decades of Creative Victoria operational funding for Snuff Puppets ended in July 2026.

== Responses ==
In 2015, Snuff Puppet's promotional video for "Everybody" went viral; copies of the video have been reported as being viewed nearly 1 billion times.

Snuff Puppets Youtube channel has over 615,000 subscribers and 380 million viral video views.

Snuff Puppets won the 2026 Creative Maribyrnong Award.

My Melbourne Arts listed Snuff Puppets Swamp in the Top 10 shows of 2023.

Realtime Magazine wrote the Snuff Puppets have a "commitment to pushing bad taste to its extreme".

== Works from repertoire ==
Snuff Puppet in Footscray

=== Shows ===
- Fool Skool
- Fat For A Good Table
- Travelling Truck Show
- Scarey
- Forest In The Night
- Dancing Cow Show
- Browne Brothers
- A Cruel Life
- Twin Towers Show
- Boom Town – with Back to Back Theatre
- Circus Ole – with acrobat
- Nyet Nyet's Picnic – with Australian Indigenous Artists
- Snuff Clubb
- Wedhus Gembel – with Padepokan Seni, Yogyakarta, Indonesia
- Snuff Party
- Everybody
- Punch Agathe – with Stefanie Oberhoff (Stuttgart) & Espace Masolo (Kinshasa)
- Heart
- Swamp
- Cochlea
- Kasper Kills The Flies – with Stefanie Oberhoff (Stuttgart)

=== Workshops ===
- People's Puppet Projects – Community development workshops
- Kidsnuff – Performance making workshops
- Snuff Skool – Puppeteering workshops
- Snuff Labb – Experimental theatre making workshops

=== Roaming acts ===
- Skullies
- The Boom Family
- Cows & Butcher
- Bunyips – with Australian Indigenous Artists
- Elephant
- Seagulls
- Snail
- Rhinoceros
- Human Body Parts
- Giant Crayfish - with the Bob Brown Foundation
- Beasts Of Oz
- Human Body Organs
