= Northern Spirit (Kammerchor) =

- Choir
- Also known as: Kammerchor
- Origin: Bremen, Germany
- Founded: 2004
- Genre: Chamber music
- Director: Jaret Choolun
- Website: www.northernspirit.de

Northern Spirit is a chamber choir consisting of young singers, the core of which is based in Bremen, Germany. The mission of Northern Spirit is to advocate and present fresh sounds in art music to the highest international artistic standards.

Since its inception Northern Spirit has been a committed promoter of Australian art music in Europe, singing the likes of Stephen Leek, Nigel Butterley, Peter Sculthorpe, Lisa Cheney, Joseph Twist, Lisa Young, Sarah Hopkins, Dan Walker, Michael Bakrnčev, Jaret Choolun, Samantha Wolf, and Clare Maclean. First directed by Australian composer Gordon Hamilton in 2006, the choir has since been directed by Ole Schmitt, and more recently by Anneke Petersen. In 2012 Northern Spirit will be directed by another young Australian composer, Jaret Choolun.
