= Julia Gillard's misogyny speech =

2012 speech by the Australian Prime Minister

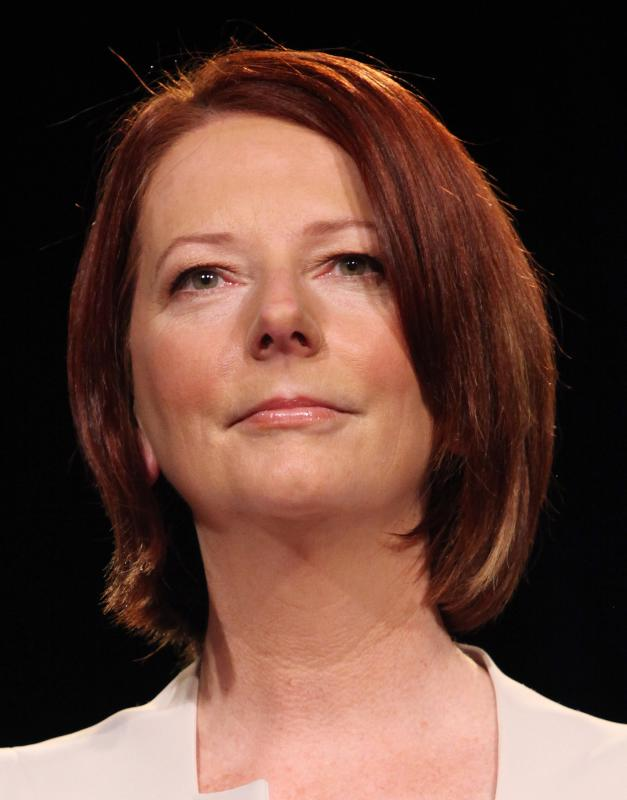
Gillard in 2010.

Julia Gillard's misogyny speech was a parliamentary speech delivered by Australian prime minister Julia Gillard to the House of Representatives on 9 October 2012. The speech was delivered during debate on a motion of no confidence moved against Peter Slipper, the speaker of the House, by opposition leader Tony Abbott.

== Background ==
=== Sexism against Gillard ===
Over the months leading up to this speech, Gillard had been criticised by parts of the Australian media and some members of the opposition Liberal–National coalition based on her status as an unmarried and childless woman. One Liberal MP, Bill Heffernan, said she "was unfit for leadership because she was deliberately barren" and another, Sophie Mirabella, said "You won't need his [ex-PM Kevin Rudd's] taxpayer-funded nanny, will you?" regarding her ousting of the previous Prime Minister.

Gillard also faced criticism for her actions as leader, with her ambition reportedly being "characterized as unseemly and unduly brutal for a woman". Later she would reveal that she was also under constant attack by her predecessor, Kevin Rudd, saying "What shouldn't happen in politics is you shouldn't be dragged down by someone who is on your own side..." When asked whether he had been involved in conversations undermining the Labor Party and undermining the government, he refused to answer. There were also several instances of "sexist and hateful attacks from anonymous critics" and "a plethora of pornographic and degrading images of the prime minister circulated on web sites, e-mail, and social media".

=== Peter Slipper texts and no-confidence motion ===
Gillard's speech was made in response to a no-confidence motion Abbott moved against Peter Slipper, the Speaker of the House of Representatives, who had defected from Abbott's Liberal Party in November 2011 to become an independent and accept Gillard's offer of the speakership. This effectively gave Gillard's minority government another vote in the House of Representatives.

On 9 October 2012, hundreds of text messages sent by Slipper were made public as part of legal proceedings instituted by his former advisor, James Ashby, who had made allegations of sexual harassment against Slipper. The text messages included numerous instances of "sexist and vulgar language", including a reference to female genitalia looking "like mussell [sic] removed from its shell [...] salty cunts in brine" and a description of Slipper's former Liberal colleague Sophie Mirabella as an "ignorant botch [sic]".

In moving the no-confidence motion, Abbott stated that Slipper's texts were sexist and misogynistic and rendered him unfit to serve as speaker, and implied that Gillard was hypocritical in defending Slipper's continuation as speaker. He stated that her government was "only too ready to detect sexism – to detect misogyny, no less – until they find it in one of their own supporters, until they find it in someone upon whom this Prime Minister relies to survive in her job". Abbott stated that every day Gillard supported Slipper was "another day of shame for a government which should already have died of shame".

== Speech contents ==
I will not be lectured about sexism and misogyny by this man; I will not.....If he [Abbott] wants to know what misogyny looks like in modern Australia, he doesn't need a motion in the House of Representatives, he needs a mirror. That's what he needs.

— Gillard

Speaking in response to Abbott's motion against Slipper, Gillard accused Abbott of hypocrisy by using accusations of sexism and misogyny to attack her. Gillard said that "every day in every way" Abbott was sexist and misogynistic himself. She linked Abbott's motion to remarks made by Alan Jones in the then-recent Alan Jones shame controversy where the broadcaster said that Julia Gillard's father had died of shame because of his daughter's lies.

Within the speech, Gillard noted a number of statements Abbott had previously made. In an interview Abbott had said, "If it's true, Stavros [the interviewer], that men have more power generally speaking than women, is that a bad thing?" When another person present at this interview stated they wanted their daughter to have as much opportunity as their son, Abbott responded, "Yeah, I completely agree, but what if men are by physiology or temperament, more adapted to exercise authority or to issue command?" Gillard also said that in March 2004, Abbott stated, "Abortion is the easy way out" and that he had stood next to anti-Gillard sign prominently containing the words "ditch the witch".

== Reactions ==
Gillard said of the speech in 2020:

"I thought it was a forceful speech because the opposition leaders had dropped their heads during it. But I had no sense of how it was going to resonate outside the parliamentary chamber. Afterward, when I sat back in my chair, my deputy prime minister, Wayne Swan, had this odd expression on his face and said, "You can't give that kind of j'accuse speech and then sit down." Then the leader of the house, Anthony Albanese, said, "Oh, I felt sorry for Tony Abbott. By the time we'd been released from the debate and I'd walked back to my office, phones were ringing, and people were sending emails. But it was only over the next few days that it was reported around the world".

The speech was criticised by some Australian journalists but attracted widespread interest and positive attention in feminist blogs and social media. Expat Chloe Angyal wrote for Britain's The Guardian that the speech tackled "sexism head-on" and was a "masterful, righteous take-down" and similar opinions were expressed by other expatriate Australian journalists. Britain's Daily Telegraph women's editor said that Gillard had cleverly shifted the focus of the news story with "an impressive set of insults". Within a week, a YouTube version of the speech had one million views. As of April 2026 the ABC news video has four million views. The context of the Labor Party's support for Peter Slipper, however, meant that commentary from domestic journalists was far more critical, with Michelle Grattan writing "it sounded more desperate than convincing", Peter Hartcher that Gillard "chose to defend the indefensible" and Peter van Onselen that the government had "egg on their collective faces". The public reaction was also polarised: approval ratings of Gillard and Abbott both improved following the speech.

Gillard told media that she had been approached by world leaders who congratulated her on the speech at the 2012 Asia-Europe Meeting, including French president François Hollande and Danish prime minister Helle Thorning-Schmidt. Gillard told press that United States president Barack Obama had mentioned her speech when she phoned to congratulate him for his victory in the 2012 United States election. Two years after the speech, Hillary Clinton said that Gillard had "faced outrageous sexism", and that she found the speech very striking.

=== Abbott's response ===
Annabel Crabb reported on the misogyny speech in The Sydney Morning Herald at the time saying that "Sexism is everywhere in politics – you just have to count the examples that have cropped up this week once everyone suddenly started to care about it." She thought that "Abbott has been guilty of sexism, and at times extreme dopiness, with respect to women. But a deep and unswerving hatred of women, every day, and in every way? It's not a case I'd prosecute," but also that "you might feel sympathy for the Opposition Leader, if he hadn't spent the past two years calling the Prime Minister an inveterate, instinctive and pathological liar." She also reported that a comedian made a joke the next night about Tony Abbott and his female chief of staff, at a minister-attended Construction, Forestry, Mining and Energy Union dinner at Australian Parliament House, but no complaints were raised till the next day when Julia Gillard later reprimanded the CFMEU Boss.

In September 2013, ahead of the 2013 federal election, Abbott discussed the speech with Annabel Crabb on her TV show Kitchen Cabinet, saying, "it was a very unfair speech, I thought, and it was a completely invalid speech in terms of responding to the issue of that day; it was just an invalid thing to say. But look, politics is about theatre and at the time I didn't think it was very effective theatre at all. But plainly it did strike a chord in a lot of people who had not followed the immediate problem that had brought on that particular parliamentary debate."

=== Gillard's remarks ===
Gillard explained the speech to The Guardian's Gabrielle Chan, remarking "I thought after everything I have experienced, I have to listen to Tony Abbott lecture me about sexism", and that it was this "That gave me the emotional start to the speech and once I started, it took on a life of its own." Additionally she felt she was receiving "the burden but none of the benefits" as being the first female prime minister of Australia.

=== Perceptions of hypocrisy ===
Gillard's speech was criticised as hypocritical by some because earlier in the day the Labor Party had passed legislation cutting welfare benefits to single parents, almost all of whom were single mothers. In Overland, Stephanie Convery wrote: "Standing up for women's rights is not just about calling sexism for what it is. It's about agitating for specific change... I don't care how many sharp speeches she makes: her government is making life for some of the most vulnerable women in Australia even harder than it already is, and I want no part in it." In Crikey, Shakira Hussein wrote "I will not be lectured on sexism or misogyny by Julia Gillard on the very day that she has driven so many women deeper into poverty." Many single mothers interviewed by Anwen Crawford for Meanjin were similarly critical of the speech's timing.

== Impact and legacy ==
After Gillard's speech went viral, the Macquarie Dictionary updated its definition of the term "misogyny". Previously defined as a "hatred of women" by the Australian dictionary, misogyny now encompasses "entrenched prejudice against women". Director of the Australian National Dictionary Centre in Canberra, Amanda Laugesen, said the broader definition has a long history, with the original Oxford English Dictionary defining misogyny as "hatred or dislike or prejudice against women" and including examples dating back to the 19th century.

Australia-born Cornell University philosopher Kate Manne uses Gillard's speech as a central, clarifying example in her 2017 book Down Girl: The Logic of Misogyny. In the book, she writes that Gillard's use of the word "misogyny" is the use that has been common among feminists for years. The example of Gillard's speech serves to clarify that misogyny and sexism are distinct concepts, designating two branches of patriarchy: sexism serves to rationalise and justify the patriarchal order, while misogyny polices and enforces patriarchal order, according to Manne.

In a 2019 Forbes article, Gillard said when talking about the reaction to the speech that she felt "that speech helps deal with those frustrations and unlock a little sense of power. It is possible to stand up and name and shame sexism and misogyny", and that women the speech reached felt connected to it because it is similar to how they would wish to respond.

The speech was voted by The Guardian readers in 2020 as the number one most unforgettable moment in Australian TV history. Gillard has expressed belief that the speech overshadowed other work in her political career: "I'm reconciled with it now and I understand that when people are writing things about me – including writing my obituary, hopefully in many years to come – that it's going to feature in there."

In 2022, the National Film and Sound Archive added The Misogyny Speech to the Sounds of Australia register for songs of "cultural, historical and aesthetic significance and relevance".

=== In the arts ===
In November 2013, singer Bronwyn Calcutt performed a sung version, accompanied by a ukulele, to the tune of Gloria Gaynor's "I Will Survive".

In 2014, the speech was turned into a song, "Not Now, Not Ever!", by Brisbane composer and University of Queensland lecturer Rob Davidson, and sung by The Australian Voices.

In November 2020, a song titled "Julia Gillard's Misogyny Speech" was released by Sydney punk rockers Scabz as a track on their debut album Pressure.

In 2022, with Gillard's permission, singer Karen Jacobsen composed a pop orchestral work with the words of the speech set to music, titled "Better Standard Than This". The music video features men and women's faces mouthing the words dubbed over with Jacobsen's voice.

In 2023, Melbourne band Playlunch released the song Tanbark, which included exerpts from the speech, and attributed Gillard as a featured artist on the song.

Julia, a play by Joanna Murray-Smith about Gillard which culminates in her misogyny speech, was produced by the Sydney Theatre Company (STC) in Sydney in 2023, starring Justine Clarke. A co-production between STC and the Canberra Theatre Centre played in Melbourne and Canberra in mid-2024, and was presented by the State Theatre Company South Australia in August 2024.
