= Wilfrid Holland =

Wilfrid Holland (27 June 1920 – 15 September 2005) was a British born composer, choral and orchestral conductor, pianist and teacher who spent the last 45 years of his life based In Canberra, Australia.

Born in Hull, England, his serious musical education started at the Royal School of Church Music in 1938. In 1946, he was appointed organist at Gonville and Caius College, Cambridge, where he studied composition and musicology. From 1950, he taught at Dover College in Kent and for ten years was a leading musician in that town, directing the Dover Choral and Orchestral Societies and the Dover Singers.

In 1960, he settled in Canberra as Director of Music at the Canberra Grammar School. The following year he was appointed musical director of the Canberra Choral Society, conducting over forty choral and orchestral concerts during the ensuing ten years. As a conductor, Holland was also responsible for helping develop the Canberra Orchestral Society, which would later become the Canberra Symphony Orchestra. In 1971 he retired from this field to concentrate on the interpretation and composing of chamber music suitable for The Winter Singers, a mixed choir which he had founded in 1963 with his wife Carol.

In mid-1992, the ACT Lieder Society (now Artsong Canberra) sponsored a concert devoted entirely to his compositions, which was an acknowledged artistic success and which, as a by-product, created a new direction in his writing. Many of his original works have been published by E.C. Schirmer of Boston, Massachusetts.

In July 1993, he disbanded The Winter Singers and decided to concentrate on piano work, mainly vocal accompaniments. From this point his composition also changed from writing choral music, to turning his hand to solo songs.

In addition to his capacity as both a composer and conductor, Wilfrid Holland worked in various other roles. Between 1960 and 1970, he lectured in music for the Canberra Adult Education Authority, and he also worked as an examiner for both the Australian Music Examinations Board and the Australian Guild of Music and Speech. He was also active as a private music teacher of both piano and theory, and was awarded the Canberra Critics' Circle Award (Music) in October 1993 for "outstanding contribution to musical life in Canberra as teacher, composer and conductor".

He continued to give small private concerts up until the year of his death, and even retained several pupils during his later years. He died in his sleep on 15 September 2005 at his retirement home in Deakin, Australian Capital Territory, aged 85.

Holland's connection with Gonville and Caius College is celebrated by the Holland Fund, which exists to provide grants to students reading Music who are in financial need.
