= Splinters Theatre of Spectacle =

Splinters Theatre of Spectacle was an Australian Performance Troupe formed in Canberra in 1985 by David Branson, Patrick Troy, Ross Cameron, and John Utans, that was known for large outdoor spectacles. Between 1985 and 1996, Splinters produced more than 20 works that played at Australian theater festivals. In 1992, they produced Cathedral of Flesh which won the Best Promenade Theater Performance Award, at the Adelaide Fringe Festival.

== History ==
Splinters evolved through a collective of writers, musicians, visual and performance artists creating loosely related skits and scenes, into a multi-format art concept production company. Working in a variety of venues with hundreds of artists Splinters produced displays all around Australia. Their offices were situated in the Gorman House Arts Centre in Canberra.

Utilizing techniques of theater, dance, performance art, puppetry, pyrotechnics, sculpture, music, and crowd manipulation, Splinters performed one-offs, seasons, exhibitions, and events. Several performance and event groups gained momentum under the Splinters banner before launching their own companies including: Snuff Puppets, ODD Productions, Temple State, Triclops.

Splinters' first performance This Fantastic Lake in 1985 at the Downer Community Hall, Canberra was funded by International Youth Year. In 1988, Splinters received a grant from the Capital Arts Patrons Organisation. After several national and rural tours funded by the Australia Council's Performing Arts Board, the last performance under the Splinters aegis was Orpheus at Gorman House, Canberra in 1997. In 2001, speaking at the Legislative Assembly for the ACT about the death of David Branson, the Australian Minister for Urban Services and Minister for the Arts called Splinters "one of the most innovative groups in Canberra's quite illustrious history of arts practice."
