= Bree van Reyk =

Australian percussionist and composer

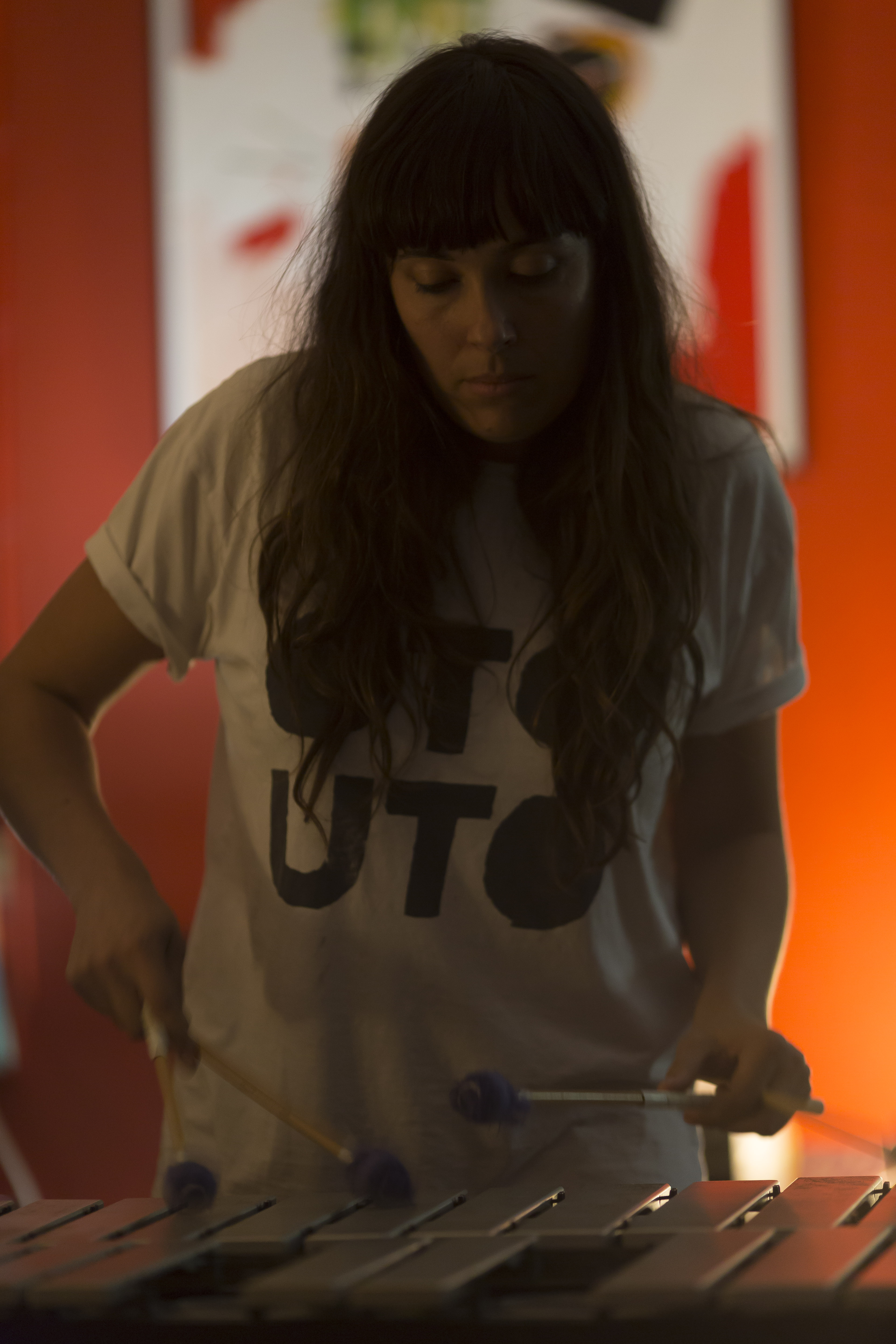
- Bree van Reyk at Hibernian House 2015

Background information
- Born: 1978 (age 47–48); Townsville, Queensland
- Origin: Australia
- Occupation: Composer
- Instrument: Drums
- Formerly of: Rebel Astronauts
- Website: www.breevanreyk.com

Bree van Reyk is an Australian percussionist and composer, born in Townsville, Queensland. She is now based in Newcastle.

== Career ==
Across her career Bree van Reyk has worked within classical, jazz, rock, and experimental music performances and groups. She has worked with the Australian Chamber Orchestra and Sydney Symphony Orchestra and played with Paul Kelly, Holly Throsby, Gurrumul, Seeker Lover Keeper, Lior, Darren Hanlon, and others.

As a child, she started learning piano before switching to the drums at age 10 and would practise by playing along to albums by Pink Floyd and Led Zeppelin. She has listed The Velvet Underground's drummer Moe Tucker as an influence. She later studied at the Australian National University School of Music.

During the 1990s and early 2000s she was a member of rock group Rebel Astronauts with Emma Hoy, Matt McBeath, and Tom Roberts. They released three singles and one mini-album, and were likened to Mogwai and Sonic Youth.

In 2010 she collaborated with Nick Wales for the soundtrack to dance work Happy As Larry. It was later released as an album.

She was artist in residence at Campbelltown Arts Centre in 2015 where she collaborated with artist Kate McIntosh on In Stereo. The two musicians performed their piece sitting back-to-back, playing on a variety of percussive instruments and found objects.

In 2019 she created a new piece for the Canberra Youth Orchestra which was performed at that years Canberra International Music Festival.

In 2020 she partnered with the Sydney Chamber Opera for her opera The Invisible Bird as part of the University of Sydney's Composing Women program. The opera was presented online due to COVID-19 restrictions in place at the time.

She contributed percussion on Nat Bartsch's album Hope, which was nominated for an ARIA Award in 2021.

Her debut album is due for release in 2022 on the independent label Hobbledehoy. It will feature Mick Turner and Jim White of Dirty Three. The first song Superclusters, Pt. II was released in January 2022.
