= Alan Jones "died of shame" controversy =

2012 event in Australia

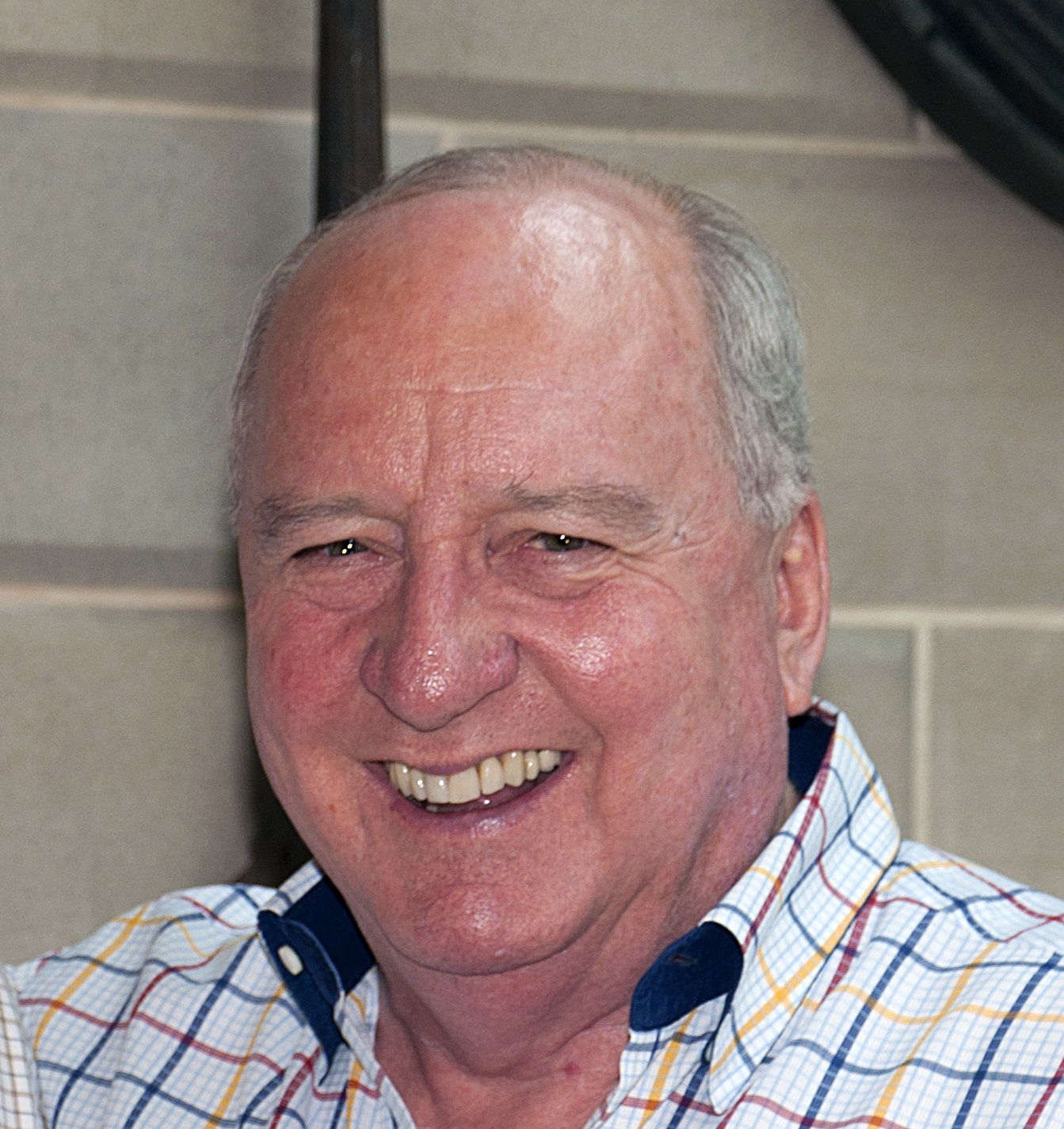
- Jones, pictured in 2011
- Date: 23 September 2012
- Venue: Sydney University Liberal Club
- Cause: An offensive joke from Alan Jones where he claimed John Gillard "died of shame" because of Julia Gillard's lies
- First reporter: Jonathan Marshall, via News Limited agencies
- Participants: Alan Jones; Simon Berger; Julia Gillard (collateral damage); Macquarie Radio Network (collateral damage)
- Outcome: More than 80 companies withdrew advertising from the Alan Jones Show; reportedly cost 2GB up to A$80,000 per day. Macquarie Radio estimated the boycott cost between A$1 – 1.5 million; some advertisers said they will never return.

The Alan Jones "died of shame" controversy originated from a speech made by Australian radio broadcaster Alan Jones in September 2012, in which Jones suggested that then-Australian Prime Minister Julia Gillard's late father, John, "died of shame" over his daughter telling lies.

== Background ==
On 23 September 2012, Sydney University Liberal Club hosted its annual president's dinner with a keynote address by Sydney radio presenter Alan Jones. In his address, Jones was cited as saying, in reference to Prime Minister Julia Gillard's recently deceased father, John Gillard, "The old man recently died a few weeks ago of shame. To think that he had a daughter who told lies every time she stood for parliament". At the same event, the club was auctioning a jacket made from chaff bags, autographed by Alan Jones, a reference to his previous comments on radio that Julia Gillard should be "put into a chaff bag and thrown into the sea".

Following this speech being made public by the media on 29 September 2012, there were calls for 2GB to dismiss Jones. Jones' speech was secretly recorded by a News Limited journalist. After the remarks were condemned across social media and the Australian media, Jones held a press conference and apologised. Jones also attempted to contact the Prime Minister to offer a personal apology, but was told she would not be returning his call. One academic linked the public reaction to the "bigger political and media context", citing the Leveson Inquiry in Britain, saying that it shows the "dark side of media power, including bullying by media owners and powerful media individuals who lobby politicians, demand favours, use their outlets as a bully pulpit and to seek revenge when they don't get their way."

Following the controversy over the comments made by Jones, on 7 October his employer, Macquarie Radio Network, announced that it would suspend all advertising on the Alan Jones breakfast show on 2GB to protect its advertisers from pressure being applied through social media activism.

Jones returned to the airwaves on 8 October 2012 without advertising.

Advertising resumed on the Jones' show on 16 October 2012 without many major advertisers.

== Reaction ==
Prime Minister Julia Gillard said she would not comment on Jones' remarks, but instead thanked the Australian people for the "outpouring of support" that she and her family had received following the death of her father. When asked if she would appear on Jones' radio program she said, "No, I would not. I haven't spoken to Mr Jones and I don't intend to."

Former Prime Minister Kevin Rudd described the comments as the "lowest of the low" and said he would be boycotting Jones' program.

Foreign Minister Bob Carr said Jones' comments were indecent and the public reaction was justifiable. Senator Carr further said "I cannot believe that it is helpful for a commercial enterprise to live with the brand 'hate radio'. And I just think the vehemence and the virulence of the message that comes out of the radio station is a very unhelpful thing for Australia".

Opposition member Malcolm Turnbull said Jones' remarks were "cruel and offensive" and that "he should apologise to the PM and her family". He described the power of the social media campaign that caused sponsors to act as "both inspiring and horrifying" and said Jones has got "a dose of his own medicine". Turnbull further said that Jones had not been the victim of cyberbullying as Jones claimed but new media had allowed thousands of Australians to speak up "unedited and unmediated".

Opposition Leader Tony Abbott described Jones' comments as "wrong and offensive". However, he used the word 'shame' in parliament on 9 October, stating that due to the ongoing Peter Slipper affair the government "should already have died of shame". Gillard responded publicly, addressing this issue directly for the first time, criticising Abbott during parliamentary question time for "misogyny and sexism". Her speech was reported worldwide, going "viral" on social media outlets.

Woolworths' state government relations manager Simon Berger who was the master of ceremonies at the function where Jones spoke, and who had donated the chaff bag jacket auctioned, resigned from his position as a result of this controversy. Woolworths said "While Simon attended the function in a private capacity, he has acknowledged that it has directly affected his ability to carry out his role at Woolworths as a member of Corporate Affairs team."

=== Regional radio stations ===
By 17 October, three regional radio stations, Albury based 2AY, Deniliquin based station 2QN and Darwin's Territory FM had stopped broadcasting Jones' show.

=== Sponsors ===
Several companies pulled out of advertising from the Alan Jones Show including Mercedes-Benz Hornsby, Woolworths, Freedom Furniture, Lexus of Parramatta, Coles, ING, Bing Lee, Mazda, 7-Eleven, Sydney Symphony Orchestra and HCF Health Insurance. The pull out by advertisers was reported to cost 2GB up to $80,000 per day.

Mercedes-Benz also withdrew Jones' Mercedes S-Class worth $250,000 which was part of the sponsorship deal.

Macquarie Radio estimated the boycott cost the station between $1 million and $1.5 million, and some advertisers said they will never return.

=== Radio audience ===
In the Nielsen radio survey conducted between 29 July 2012 and 20 October 2012, Jones increased his share of total radio listeners, gaining an extra 0.5% of the market. Jones had 17.3 per cent of the audience for 2GB from 5.30 a.m. to 9 a.m.

The Nielsen radio survey conducted between 28 October 2012 and 23 February 2013 indicates the 2GB audience is 15.4 per cent for the 5.30 a.m. to 9.00 a.m. time slot.

== See also ==
- Misogyny Speech
