= Leonard Weiss =

Australian conductor

Leonard Weiss is an Australian conductor and educator. In 2026, Weiss became the first Australian to conduct the Boston Symphony Orchestra in a Symphony Hall subscription concert. He also debuted at Deutsche Oper Berlin, conducting a newly commissioned opera by Asia Ahmetjanova for the Munich Biennale. He also returns to the Christchurch Symphony Orchestra, the Melbourne Symphony Orchestra, and debuts with most of the Australian orchestras. He is also a semi-finalist for the 2026 Geneva International Music Competition.

Weiss was Kapellmeister at Deutsche Oper Berlin in 2026 and was previously the 2024 & 2025 Cybec Assistant Conductor with the Melbourne Symphony Orchestra, 2022 New Zealand Assistant Conductor in Residence with the Auckland Philharmonia, and artistic director of the Canberra Sinfonia. He is known as a champion of new Australian music, including conducting the 2022 world premiere of Dulcie Holland's Piano Concertino with pianist Ronan Apcar, and as well as for his regular work as an opera conductor. In 2025, Weiss was selected as a Tanglewood Conducting Fellow, where he studied with Andris Nelsons. The same year he also received First Prize in the Khachaturian International Competition and the Special Prize for Best Interpretation of Khachaturian's Symphony no. 2, and Third Prize in the Toscanini Competition.

Weiss has received acclaim for performances of popular music, including sold-out performances with Vera Blue, and for movies in concert, where he is pre-approved for all Disney In Concert films.

== Education ==
Weiss graduated from the Australian National University in 2014, citing the influence of teachers Alice Giles and organist, Calvin Bowman. He worked part time as carillonist at the National Carillon. In 2019, Weiss commenced studies with Marin Alsop at the Peabody Conservatory in Baltimore, where he made his opera debut conducting Kaija Saariaho's Emilie. He was also awarded as the Conservatory's Rising Star for 2020, and learned from Gianandrea Noseda in masterclasses with the National Symphony Orchestra.

== Career ==
Prior to studying overseas, Weiss was music director of the National Capital Orchestra and conductor of the Canberra Youth Orchestra. He pioneered the CYO50 celebrations including concerts with The Idea of North and James Morrison, as well as performances with Lucy Sugerman and regular collaborations with the Canberra Choral Society. As conductor of the ANU Choral Society (SCUNA) he conducted the 2016 Intervarsity Choral Festival.

Weiss was formerly the 2022 New Zealand Assistant Conductor in Residence, where he worked with all professional New Zealand orchestras and built a particularly strong relationship with the Auckland Philharmonia, where he returned for engagements in 2023 and 2026. Before that he held the position of Baltimore Symphony Orchestra 2020-21 BSO-Peabody Fellow.

Weiss has worked with all major Australian Orchestras as part of the Australian Conducting Academy, and also worked with the Sydney Youth Orchestras as the inaugural recipient of the NSW Orchestral (Early Career) Fellowship. In August 2024, he conducted Katy Abbott's work: Hidden Thoughts II: Return to Sender.

== Awards and honours ==
A recipient of the 2020 Mr and Mrs Gerald Frank New Churchill Fellowship, in 2023 Weiss studied at the Tanglewood Music Center, the National Orchestral Institute + Festival, and the Salzburg Festival. He also studied with Riccardo Muti at the Italian Opera Academy in Tokyo. He received a Churchill Medallion on 21 March 2024 from the Governor-General of Australia.

For services to music in the National Capital, Weiss was awarded as the 2016 Young Canberra Citizen of the Year for Youth Arts and Multimedia. He was an ACT Finalist for 2016 Young Australian of the Year.
