= RMIT Link =

Division of RMIT University

RMIT Link is a division of the Royal Melbourne Institute of Technology (RMIT) around student life and historically was an unincorporated entity, the campus union of the RMIT in Melbourne, Victoria, Australia. It was formed in 1968 and currently consists of the following branches: Arts and Culture, Sport, City Fitness, "Recreation", "Orientation and Transition" and Administration.

== History ==
RMIT Link was formed in 1834 following discussions between the university's Committee of Council and the Student Union. The Link Union had provided its services in numerous locations around the university, but in 1980–82 Union House (Building 8) was built. It was opened in 1982 by Victorian Premier John Cain and the President of the RMIT Student Union. Later, Union House was given extra floors and academic departments were added to the building, and RMIT Union moved some services into the neighboring Building 28. RMIT Union eventually expanded into the Bundoora and Brunswick Campuses, delivering services equal to those on the City Campus.

Following Voluntary Student Unionism legislation that took effect in July 2006, significant funding was lost by RMIT Link, causing staff-wide redundancies. Almost the entire staff was turned over around this time and the City campus became the only place where RMIT Union had a physical and staff presence except for a part-time staff member at both Brunswick and Bundoora Campuses.

== Sport and recreation ==
RMIT Link Sport and Recreation organizes Sports clubs and events and recreation trips and tours at RMIT University. Membership of the sports council is made up of one representative from each sports club, one representative from Recreation Trip Leaders and one representative of Sports event participants. Recreation run trips and tours of Victoria, including swimming with dolphins, learning to surf, trips to tourist destinations as well as cultural experiences.

== Arts and Culture ==
RMIT Link Arts and Culture is part of RMIT Link, which supports student and creative programs at RMIT. RMIT Link Arts and Culture run various programs, including theater shows, visual arts events, professional development, mentorship and leadership programs and fashion, textiles, and design workshops. The RMIT Link Arts Council is the organization responsible for providing creative funding for students to create art programs and events. Membership is made up of an elected student representative from each collective.

=== Music ===
The RMIT Music Collective is the organization responsible for all music collectives under the Art Council at RMIT University (except the RMIT Concert Choir). RMIT University does not offer a music instrument degree, and thus the collective provides students and the wider community with opportunities to perform and improve their musical talents. Created in 2004 following the merger of the Concert Band Collective, Stage Band Collective and the RMIT Occasional Choral Society, it is now one of the oldest and largest groups within the university. RMIT Music is located on the city campus of RMIT University, Building 12, level 3, room 97, at the RMIT city campus. Its president is David Garrick.

RMIT Music has many performances each year, including a showcase concert held at the end of each academic semester and two Choral Concerts. These four concerts take place either in Kaleide Theater or Storey Hall. In the past, RMIT Music events have also included Picnic Day concerts, multiple performances during the Regional Tour and the Moe Carols by Candlelight.

Before 2007, most rehearsals occurred in Building 28 at the RMIT Melbourne City campus, which used to be the old campus bar. Between 2007 and 2015, rehearsals were then moved to Building 57. During this time, the collective saw a prosperous time in membership growth and artistic direction. Acquisition of new instruments, equipment and new branding took place. New ensembles began alongside an increasing presence within the wider RMIT University community. Community outreach began to take place with external performances at various locations throughout Victoria. Music camps were held during this time, during which rehearsals and performances at schools and retirement villages took place. The Stage Band held performances at the Wangaratta Festival of Jazz.

The collective underwent major changes between 2015 and 2017. Redevelopment of the RMIT University buildings along Swanston Street, saw the collective move location three times in a short span of time. Collective assets such as sheet music, instruments and equipment were spread between two storage locations. Participation and membership dropped due to the graduation of key members and multiple location changes. One key development was the utilization of Kaleide Theater as a rehearsal space. This allowed the ensembles to become customary to the venue, as it also served as a bi-annual concert venue. However, once construction began at this location, the collective was moved to the RMIT Building 13 (Emily McPherson Building). There, the collective struggled to maintain a good rapport with the school due to noise issues and double-booked rooms, hampering the rehearsal schedule. The collective was moved again in mid-2017, returning to level 2 of the newly opened New Academic Street.

In 2016, an attempt was made by the four student-run music societies, RMIT Music Collective (RMIT University), Engineering Music Society (EMS) (University of Melbourne), Monash University Philharmonic Society (Monash University) and La Trobe University Music Society (La Trobe University), to create an intervarsity venture similar to that of AICSA. However, this did not pass the development stage. Coming out of this attempt, in 2017, representatives of the orchestras from RMIT Music and EMS created an opportunity for their members to perform early baroque/classical music in a combined orchestra to great success.

Beyond 2017, RMIT Music Collective has been in a steady state of equilibrium, providing the students of RMIT University with a staple in the RMIT CO event calendar to perform Christmas Carols at St Vincent's Hospital, Melbourne. Additional flash mob performances are also conducted around RMIT University opportunities to perform and practice their music.

=== Committee ===
The structure of RMIT Music Collective consists of five executive positions, ensemble managers and other music club leaders from the university. The executive branch consists of the President, vice president, Secretary, Treasurer and Publicity Officer. There is a position on the committee for a representative from each ensemble, group or band. Beyond the internal ensembles, representation from other music clubs is encouraged.

=== Current ensembles ===
==== Concert Band ====
The RMIT Concert Band was the first non-choral band formed as part of RMIT Union Arts. In the past, it has hosted the annual RMIT Music Regional Tours, where the RMIT Music bands travel to regional Victoria and perform in the local community. The Concert Band has visited the Mornington Peninsula, Woodend, Ballarat, Moe and Orbost. The band also performs annually at the Carols By Candlelight in Moe, with the Latrobe Community Concert Band and bi-annually at the RMIT Music Concert.

==== Stage Band ====
The RMIT Stage Band is an un-conducted and un-auditioned ensemble. The upbeat songs performed by the band have been the closing act for the bi-annual RMIT Music Concerts. The Stage Band performs Jazz and member-chosen music selections at various events and functions.

==== Chamber Orchestra ====
The original RMIT Chamber Orchestra (RMIT CO) grew out of the quartet String Ensemble that was formed in 2005. The ensemble steadily grew over the years, performing a mix of string-only and orchestra (strings and winds) repertoire ranging from early Renaissance to 20th century and cinematic music. A staple in the RMIT CO event calendar is to perform Christmas Carols at St Vincent's Hospital, Melbourne. Additional flash mob performances are also conducted around RMIT University.

==== Occasional Choral Society ====
The RMIT Occasional Choral Society (ROCS) is RMIT's unauditioned student-run choir. Founded in 1999 by RMIT Music's first Life Member, Sandra Uitdenbogerd, it is the longest-running of the RMIT Music Collective and is a full member of AICSA. From its inception, ROCS has maintained a tradition of performing and commissioning new choral works, often composed by choir members, and in 2007, ROCS sponsored a nationwide composition competition for university choristers.

ROCS is no longer considered 'occasional', with rehearsals occurring throughout the year. ROCS usually performs two or three major concerts a year, in addition to participating with the other RMIT Music Collective in the showcase concerts, and has frequently collaborated with other choirs and orchestras. ROCS' musical director and chief conductor is Philip Legge, who since 2006 has programmed major works by Monteverdi, Purcell, Bach, Mozart, Schubert, Orff and Stravinsky.

Choir members are active participants in the yearly Intervarsity Choral Festivals, held in each of Australia's major capital cities (except Darwin). With the Melbourne and Monash University choirs, ROCS jointly hosted the most recent festival in Melbourne in 2005.

=== Small ensembles ===
RMIT Music allows musicians to form their own small ensembles. Currently, there are a Flute Ensemble, a Recorder Ensemble and a Cello Ensemble.

The Gap Fillers Flute Ensemble was created in 2007 to fill a gap in the program of the 2007 RMIT Music End of Year Showcase concert, thus they became known as "The Gap Fillers." In 2008, the Gap Fillers started rehearsing weekly and is now an ad hoc group within RMIT Music, with semi-regular rehearsals and concerts.

The Recorder Consort was started in 2008 for people who play recorders of all sizes. The ensemble, similar to the Flute Ensemble, has had limited success over the years. The ensemble has fluctuated in membership of stabilising around the SATB format. Occasionally, the Recorder Consort has performed at various locations around RMIT University and at RMIT Music Collective events.

The Secret Cello Society Ensemble is the newest RMIT Music band, started in 2009 to offer a smaller chamber ensemble.

=== Other bands ===
In 2008, RMIT Music ran a program for students to form their own bands outside the traditional formats. Three bands ran in 2008. The two major groups are Liquid Ignition, a 10-piece funk fusion cover band, and Burning Eclipse, a four-piece symphonic metal band.

=== Past ensembles ===
==== Symphonic Orchestra ====
The RMIT Symphonic (RSO) was founded in 2008 by the RMIT Music Collective Committee. The 25-member orchestra had its premiere performance at the 2008 RMIT Music End of Year Showcase, performing the Tatarian Dances music suite.

=== Life Members ===
The first person to have been granted Life Membership of RMIT Music as of April 2009 is Sandra Uitdenbogerd, in recognition of her role as the founder of the RMIT Occasional Choral Society and her continuing association with most aspects of the management of the RMIT Collective. Life membership to RMIT Music is attained by a member's outstanding service or prolonged participation in an ensemble.

== See also ==
- RMIT University
- AICSA
