= David Branson =

Australian theatre director

David Branson (February 1963 – 11 December 2001) was an Australian theatre director, actor, and writer.

David Branson's father John was an Antarctic scientist, and his mother Margaret a school librarian. Branson was born in Melbourne in 1963 and moved with his family to Canberra in 1965. He attended Hackett Primary School, Watson High School, and Dickson College in Canberra. He was regular churchgoer and a member of many youth groups.

Branson was a dynamic thespian and theatre-worker. He worked with community groups, youth theatres, Repertory Theatre, and groups of his own devising to create innumerable productions. He played the violin in the Canberra Youth Orchestra and in many local bands such as The Black Dogs, The Plunderers, and The Gadflys. He was a member of, among others, the Doug Anthony Allstars, Found Objects and the Performing Arts Cafe.

In 1985 Branson, Ross Cameron, John Utans, and Patrick Troy founded Splinters Theatre of Spectacle which had its origins in mediaevalist antics in Canberra's inner north.

Splinters staged several large productions, sometimes involving hundreds of people, fire sculptures, giant puppets, & large moving metal sculptures. Early Splinters performances were at a now-demolished weatherboard cottage in Downer, and the Causeway Hall at Kingston, as well as backyards in the inner north. Splinters made good use of crowd manipulation. During his time with Splinters he was involved in more than 20 productions including Cry Stinking Fish (1987) as part of the Melbourne Spoleto Festival, Gumboot Full of Blood (1988), Cathedral of Flesh (1992) (winner Best Promenade Theatre Performance Award in the Adelaide Fringe Festival, Guardians of the Concourse (1993, National Festival of Australian Theatre, Canberra), Utopia/Distopia (1995, Springbank Island, Canberra), and Faust - The Heat of Knowledge (1996, 50th Anniversary Celebrations of the Australian National University).

After theatre studies in Melbourne, Branson worked as an actor with many different companies including La Mama Theatre. As a director he staged The Threepenny Opera and Handel's Ariodante. His Ribbons of Steel used a mix of archival material, interpretive art, sculpture and photographic exhibits, to mark the closure of BHP's Newcastle Steelworks. Under the pseudonym 'Senor Handsome' he was a founding member, and violinist, of the cabaret group Mikelangelo and the Black Sea Gentlemen. He also directed works by Daniel Keene, Grahame Henderson, Alison Croggon, Geire Kami and Christos Tsiolkas. Branson remained with Splinters until 1996 when he became the Artistic Director of Culturally Innovative Arts, which he founded with Louise Morris. Branson remained a Canberra identity, and divided his time largely between Canberra and Melbourne. In Canberra he hosted the "Terrace Sessions" at the Terrace Bar, the Gypsy Bar and the "Salons at the Street" at the Street Theatre, where many avant-garde performances were staged. Branson often accompanying others with impromptu violin or off-the-cuff poesy. Branson coined the moniker "Brian Desire" for Canberra artist/poet Brian Hincksmann.

He died in a car accident at Anzac Parade. 200 people attended his funeral at St Margaret's Uniting Church in Hackett, the inner-north suburb of Canberra where he grew up. And a large crowd performed and attended Memorials at the Street Theatre in Canberra and the Trades Hall in Melbourne. A street in Dunlop in the Belconnen region of Canberra is named after him.
