= Alan Bellhouse =

Australian mathematician

Alan Bellhouse AM
- Born: Alan Robert Bellhouse; 28 June 1914; Stanmore, New South Wales, Australia
- Died: 31 December 1980 (aged 66); Northbridge, New South Wales
- Education: Fort Street High School; University of Sydney; Sydney Conservatorium of Music.
- Occupations: Mathematician, teacher, musician, author
- Employers: Sydney Technical High School; Sydney Grammar School; Newington College
- Known for: Music
- Spouse: Dulcie Holland
- Children: 2
- Parent(s): Florence Chapman (née Pickering) and the Reverend Herbert Edward Bellhouse

Alan Robert Bellhouse AM (28 June 1914 –31 December 1980) was an Australian mathematician, teacher, musician and author of musical textbooks. He founded the North Sydney Symphony Orchestra in 1947. The National Library of Australia holds over twenty books published by Bellhouse with many of them entitled "... for beginners".

== Biography ==
Bellhouse was born in Stanmore, New South Wales, the second son of Florence Chapman (née Pickering) and the Reverend Herbert Edward Bellhouse (1879–1961).

His father was a Methodist minister and he attended state schools in Kempsey, Woodford, Mudgee and Hamilton before sitting for the Leaving Certificate at Fort Street High School in Sydney. He was awarded a Bachelor of Arts with Honours in Mathematics at the University of Sydney and a Diploma of Education graduating in 1935 and studied music at the Sydney Conservatorium of Music.

After a year working in the Department of Trade and Customs he joined the Department of Education and taught music at Sydney Technical High School and later mathematics. In 1940 he married the Australian composer Dulcie Holland and they had two children, a daughter Holly and a son Lindsay.

At the beginning of World War II Bellhouse was a maths teacher with the Education Department and so was not allowed to enlist. So he changed jobs and his new employer, Sydney Grammar School, allowed him to serve.

In 1942 the RAAF posted him to educational duties in Sydney for two years and he served as an instructor in science, mathematics, meteorology, and aircraft recognition. During this time he wrote his first book entitled Whose Plane is That? Then he was posted to an active service area 60 miles from Darwin, Northern Territory. He was discharged in January 1946 as a flight lieutenant.

At war's end he rejoined the music and mathematics staff of Sydney Grammar, and having played A Grade Tennis before the war, became a GPS tennis coach. Then he approached the North Sydney Council for help in forming an orchestra. The mayor was sympathetic to the idea and provided financial assistance from the council to establish a combined orchestral and choral group. This was to be the first ever orchestra on the north side of Sydney. The newly-formed North Shore Symphony Orchestra and the North Shore Choral Society held their first rehearsal on 14 February 1947 in the hall of St Thomas' Anglican Church, North Sydney. The first concert was given on 20 June 1947. In 1951 and 1952 Bellhouse took up an exchange teaching post in London with his wife and young children. From 1964 until 1973 Bellhouse was the director of music at Newington College in Sydney.

== Author ==
- Whose Plane is That?: The Matter of Aircraft Recognition in Australia Explained Simply for the Layman As Well As for the Student
- Musical Biographies for Beginners and for A.M.E.B. Musicianship Students
- Classroom Teaching and Discipline
- Ballet Music for Beginners
- Opera for Beginners
- The Operatic and Concert Overture for Beginners
- The Symphony Orchestra for Beginners
- Harmony for Beginners
- Asian Music for Beginners

== Oral history ==
In an oral history recorded with historian Hazel de Berg Bellhouse speaks about writing books on music, his musical compositions, his setting of words to music, his family background, his studies at the Sydney Conservatorium of Music and the University of Sydney and his honours degree in mathematics, the beginnings of the North Shore Symphony Orchestra, the type of music the orchestra performs, and his retirement.

== Honours ==
- Member of the Order of Australia, 1977
- Honorary D.Litt. from Macquarie University, 1993

== Legacy ==
- In 1965 Bellhouse instigated and donated the Reverend H.E. Bellhouse Award for Music in memory of his father who had died in 1961. The prizes are still awarded annually at Newington College.
- A University of Sydney scholarship titled the Alan Bellhouse Award is presented to an outstanding student with the highest marks in conducting is awarded annually.
- Bellhouse Crescent, Moncrieff, Australian Capital Territory, is named in his honour.
