= Topology (musical ensemble) =

Topology is an indie classical quintet from Australia, formed in 1997.. They perform throughout Australia and abroad and have to date released 14 albums, including one with rock/electronica band Full Fathom Five and one with contemporary ensemble Loops. They were formerly the resident ensembles at the University of Western Sydney and Brisbane Powerhouse. The group works with composers including Tim Brady, Andrew Poppy, Michael Nyman, Jeremy Peyton Jones, Terry Riley, Steve Reich, Philip Glass, Carl Stone, Pand aul Dresher, as well as with many Australian composers.

In 2009, Topology won the "Outstanding Contribution by an Organization" award at the Australasian Performing Right Association (APRA) Classical Music Awards for their work on the 2008 Brisbane Powerhouse Series.

== Members ==
- Bernard Hoey (viola)
- Christa Powell (violin)
- John Babbage (saxophone)
- Kylie Davidson (piano)
- Therese Milanovic (piano)
- Robert Davidson (bass)

== Discography ==
=== Albums ===
List of albums, with selected details
Title	Details
Topology	Released: 1999; Format: CD; Label: Serrated Records (10899)
Perpetual Motion Machine	Released: March 2003; Format: CD; Label: Serrated Records (310303)
Future Tense (with Full Fathom Five)	Released: 2004; Format: CD; Label: Valve Records (V61)
Airwaves (with Loops)	Released: 2005; Format: CD; Label: Serrated Records (310505)
Scat (with Tim Brady)	Released: 2007; Format: CD; Label: Tim Brady
Big Decisions	Released: 2008; Format: CD; Label: Serrated Records (281008)
Difference Engine	Released: 2008; Format: CD; Label: Serrated Records (311008)
Healthy (with Misinterprotato)	Released: 2010; Format: CD; Label: Topology and Misinterprotato
From Small Things Grow (with Clocked Out)	Released: 2012; Format: CD; Label: Topology and Clocked Out
Ten Hands	Released: 2013; Format: CD, Digital; Label: Topology
Share House	Released: May 2014; Format: CD, Digital; Label: Serrated Records (080514)
The Singing Politician (with The Australian Voices)	Released: May 2016; Format: CD, Digital; Label: Topology
Tortured Remixes	Released: June 2017; Format: CD, Digital; Label: Topology, Serrated Records (110517)
Twenty	Released: November 2017; Format: CD, Digital; Label: Topology
We Will Rise	Released: June 2020; Format: CD, Digital; Label: Topology
Killing Music	Released: October 2021; Format: CD, Digital; Label: Topology

== Awards and nominations ==
=== APRA Awards ===
- APRA Awards of 2009: Outstanding Contribution by an Organisation win for the 2008 Brisbane Powerhouse Series by Topology.

=== ARIA Music Awards ===
The ARIA Music Awards are presented annually from 1987 by the Australian Recording Industry Association (ARIA).

Year	Nominee / work	Award	Result	Ref.
2014	Share House	Best Classical Album	Nominated	
