= Gordon Hamilton (composer) =

Australian composer and conductor

Gordon Hamilton (born 1982) is an Australian composer and conductor. Since 2009, he has been the artistic director of The Australian Voices. He was born in Newcastle, lived and worked in Bremen, Germany for five years as a conductor and composer and he now lives in Brisbane.

== Life ==
Hamilton studied in Australia at the University of Newcastle Conservatorium from 2000 to 2004, majoring in composition with Nigel Butterley and piano with Carmel Lutton. At the same time, he undertook private lessons in orchestral conducting with David Banney.

In October 2003 he was invited to the city of Hakodate, Japan, where he performed a solo piano program of Messiaen, Butterley and Debussy.

In 2004 Hamilton conducted the premiere of the opera The Impossible Body by Katrina Pring, for which he and Pring received a City of Newcastle Dramatic Award (CONDA).

In January 2006, Hamilton founded Northern Spirit, a young vocal ensemble committed to contemporary choral music. In just over three years, Northern Spirit has given over fifty concerts, premiered seventeen works, and taken part in four international choral festivals. Under Hamilton's direction, Northern Spirit has performed in Germany, Spain, France, and Iceland.

In September 2009, Hamilton moved back to Australia to take over as the new conductor and artistic director of one of Australia's foremost vocal ensembles, The Australian Voices, which was under the direction of respected Australian composer Stephen Leek for twelve years. Hamilton sang with this acclaimed ensemble from 2000 until 2004. Several of his compositions, including "Under the Shadow of Kileys Hill" (2000) and "Priepriggie" (2009), have been commissioned by this choir and performed in many different countries.

Hamilton has also received several international compositional awards, including first prize in the Coral Gables Congregational Church Florida 2006 Composition Prize, with a work for strings (Reggaeton, which premiered in 2007 in Florida, US). Another of Hamilton's string compositions ("Sale el Sol", which had its premiere in 2008 in Raumberg, Austria) won the second prize at the International Chamber Days, Raumberg 2008 Composition Prize. Finally, Hamilton's work for chamber orchestra Sinfonietta-Concertante (which was premiered by the Luxembourg Sinfonietta in 2007 in Ettelbruck, Luxembourg) received fourth prize in the Luxembourg Sinfonietta 2007 Composition Prize.
