= Stephen Leek =

Australian Composer, Conductor, and Music educator (born 1959)

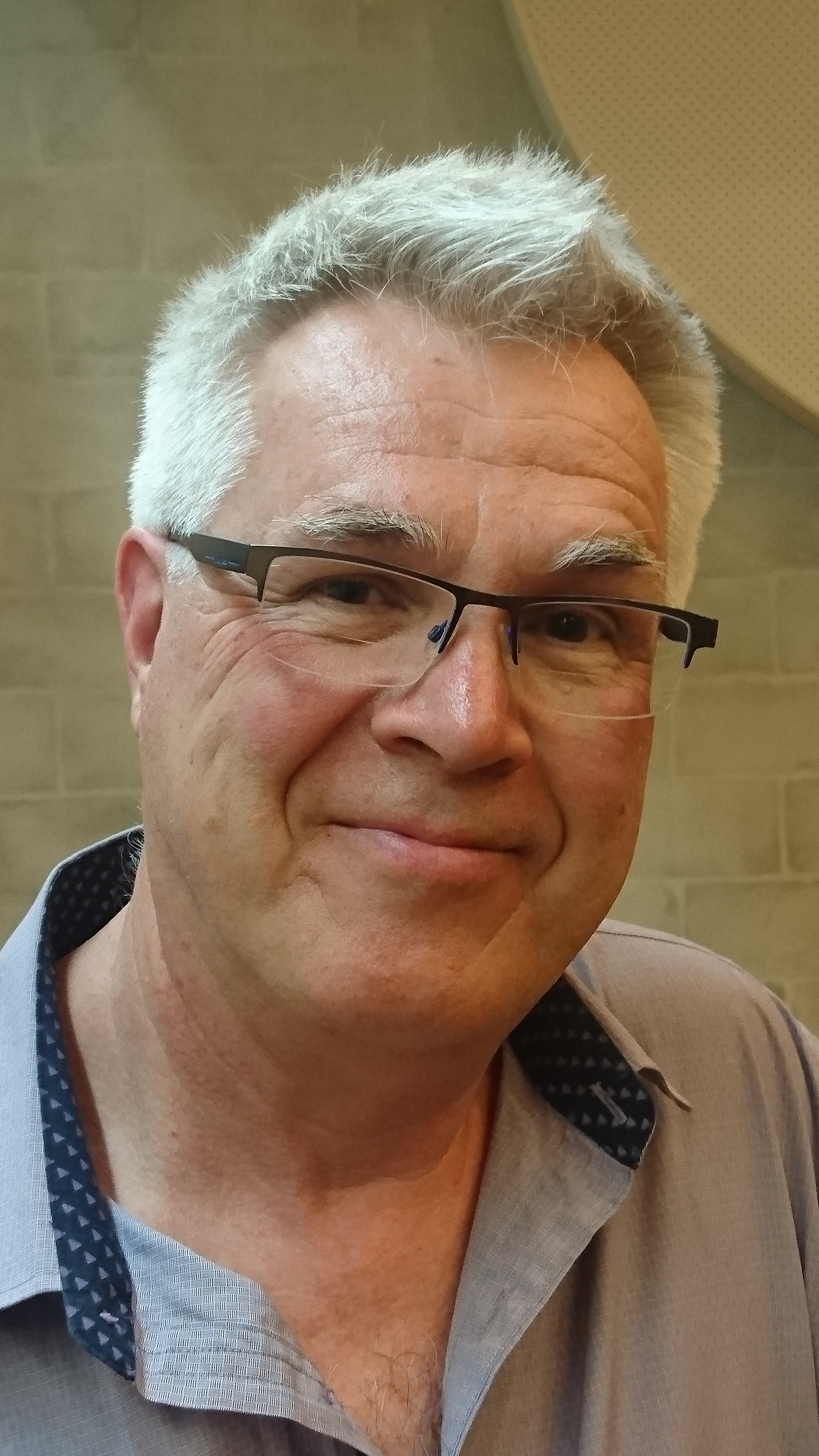
Leek in 2019

Stephen Leek (born 1959) is an Australian composer, conductor, educator, and publisher who specialises in choral music.

== Early life ==
Leek was born in Sydney in 1959, lived in Brisbane from 1964 through 1969, and then spent the rest of his childhood in Canberra. After coming late to music, Leek took up piano and percussion, and later the cello as a teenager, and became active as a member of many musical organisations including the Canberra Children's Choir, Canberra Youth Orchestra, Australian Youth Orchestra, Canberra Symphony Orchestra and his own vocal group, VOCE. He attended Torrens Primary School, Melrose High School and Phillip College (now Canberra College).

Following school and after a period of working in Sydney, Leek returned to Canberra in 1979 and commenced a Bachelor of Arts (Music) degree at the Canberra School of Music graduating with a double degree – the first student to achieve this honour. After graduating in 1984 with a double degree majoring in Cello Performance and Composition, Leek moved to Sydney, where he free-lanced as a cellist and as a composer – getting more work as a music copyist than anything else in the initial stages. As a music copyist he was able to work for many of the active composers around Sydney at that time. He also worked as a music copyist and arranger for Musica Viva Australia, the Australian Broadcasting Corporation, and the Midday Show.

== Choral work and composition ==
His early professional career began as full-time composer and musician for the then Tasmanian Dance Company (now TASDANCE) for 3 years. During this time he worked with many of Australia's leading choreographers and dancers in the creation on new work and also in the innovative Dance in Education program of the company. Much of this time was spent "on the road" with the company working in small towns, schools and in community centres around Tasmania. When he resumed his freelance career as a composer in 1986, he worked extensively in theatre, dance, education and community music across Australia and undertook numerous residencies in schools, universities, community groups, orchestras, choirs and theatre companies. Some of his residencies have included the National Music Camp (2 years), St Peters Lutheran College (4 × 3 months), Sydney Grammar School, Sydney Youth Orchestra, the Arena Theatre Company (Melbourne) and Alice Springs Junior Singers. He has written widely on composition and contributed to numerous books and treatise on this subject area. Prior to setting up The Australian Voices, Leek created the innovative and experimental ensemble vOiCeArT who became quite well known in Australia for their choral and musical improvisational performance events in concert halls, theatres, galleries, city malls and other public spaces across Australia. Many of the members from vOiCeArT are now leading composers and performers both in Australia and overseas.

Leek has been described as a pioneer of composer residency schemes in the Australian music community, and his involvement with numerous groups across Australia has strongly influenced the nature and directions of new Australian choral music. He has also been described as Australia's best known choral composer. In 1993 Leek, with Graeme Morton, founded The Australian Voices, an ensemble of young adult singers who work to promote Australian composers and change the landscape of choral music in Australia. Leek left The Australian Voices in 2009, leaving Gordon Hamilton as Artistic Director.

Over the past 20 years Leek has worked with ensembles including The Sydney Children's Choir, Ausdance, Gondwana Voices, St Peters Chorale at St. Peters Lutheran College (Brisbane), Glenn Ellyn Children's Choir (USA), The Australian Youth Orchestra, Opera Queensland, Tapiola Children's Choir (Finland), Taipei American School (Taiwan), Leeds Girls' High School (UK) and The Formosa Singers (Taiwan).

Stephen Leek's music is published by Morton Music, Oxford University Press, Boosey & Hawkes and more recently self-published at stephenleek.com. For many years Leek taught Composition and Improvisation sessionally at the Queensland Conservatorium Griffith University. In 2009 he left this position to fulfill to a greater capacity his hectic freelance schedule of commissions, workshops, residencies, teaching and conducting engagements, as Vice President on the Board of the International Federation for Choral Music, and freelanced as a choral conductor and teacher across the world including China, Japan, Taiwan, Korea, Indonesia, Canada, Singapore, Finland, Hungary and in the US. In 2018 Leek withdrew from the IFCM and now, living in Canberra, he continues to pursue his activities as a freelance composer, conductor, teacher and publisher around the world whilst Artistic Director/ General Manager of Canberra's Young Music Society, creating musical opportunities and experiences for young people.

== Acclaim and awards ==
Amongst his numerous accolades and awards, Leek has been the recipient of a Sounds Australian National Award for the Most Distinguished Contribution to Australian Fine Music by an Individual in 1991, A Sounds Australian National Award for Best Composition in 1990, an Australia Council Fellowship, a Churchill Fellowship, and the Australian Federation Medal.

In 2003 Leek was awarded the prestigious Robert Edler International Prize for Choral Music. Leek was cited by a distinguished international jury for his 'decisive influence' on both the Australian music scene and the international choral community as a composer and conductor.

In 2004, his composition die dunkle Erde was commissioned by the Brisbane Writers Festival and in 2006 was selected by the Australian Broadcasting Corporation to represent Australia at the UNESCO International Rostrum of Composers in Paris. Based on texts by the contemporary Brisbane-based indigenous poet Samuel Wagan Watson, the work is scored for speaker, didgeridoo and voices.

In 2005 Leek was Composer in Residence at the Marktoberdorf Musik Akademy in Bavaria, Germany, and guest conductor with the acclaimed Formosa Choir in concerts in Taiwan.

In 2006, Leek presented workshop sessions and concerts throughout Australia and overseas including the Australian National Conference of Orff Schulwerk, the ISME (International Society for Music Education Conference) in Malaysia and at the World Choir Games in China.

In 2007 he fulfilled numerous commissions and undertook several guest conducting positions around the world including work and concerts with The Taiwan National Youth Choir.

In 2008 he was awarded the Sounds Australian Award for Best Choral Composition of 2007/8. He was also a member of the international jury at the World Choir Games in Austria and was a contributing composer to the World Sun Songs Project with the Kamer... choir in Latvia.
