= Canberra Youth Orchestra =

Australian youth orchestra

The Canberra Youth Orchestra (CYO) is a youth orchestra established in 1967 in Canberra, Australia. It mainly comprises musicians aged 15 to 25.

== History ==
The Canberra Youth Orchestra was established in 1967. It traces its origins to 1962 and a small informal gathering of external players with the Braddon Catholic Girls High School Orchestra, with the orchestra conducted by Brigidine nun, Mother Winifred. The Canberra Youth Orchestra was one of the key ensembles in the Canberra Youth Orchestra Society. The Canberra Youth Orchestra Society became Canberra Youth Music Inc. which was merged with Music for Everyone to form Music for Canberra in 2015.

The Canberra Youth Orchestra travelled to Aberdeen, Scotland in 1980 to take part in the International Festival of Youth Orchestras.

In 1985, the CYO was named best symphony orchestra in the International Youth and Music Festival, in Vienna. It had also won the Austrian Radio and Television prize for the best radio performance.

The CYO performed Sitsky: In Celebration of Larry's 80th Birthday on 31 October 2014 to commemorate its patron's 80th birthday.

With conductor Leonard Weiss, the CYO re-established a regular subscription season at Llewellyn Hall. As part of the CYO 50th anniversary season in 2017, the orchestra performed The Idea of North and with Australian trumpeter James Morrison. In 2018 the orchestra performed with local icon Lucy Sugerman, with Weiss and Sugerman orchestrating her original works.

In 2019, CYO alumnus Bree van Reyk created a new piece for the Canberra Youth Orchestra which was performed at that years Canberra International Music Festival.

In 2021, incoming CYO conductor Louis Sharpe opined that the CYO had fallen on hard times, in part because of upheaval at ANU School of Music. Sharpe intimated his ambition to build the CYO back up to a full strength orchestra of 60-70 players.

In August 2024, Music for Canberra joined with six other State Youth Orchestras (Queensland Youth Orchestras, Sydney Youth Orchestra, Melbourne Youth Orchestra, Tasmanian Youth Orchestra, Adelaide Youth Orchestra and Western Australian Youth Orchestra) to form the Australian Network of Youth Orchestras.

== Past conductors ==
- Andrew McCullough
- Richard McIntyre
- Max McBride
- Wilf Jones
- Dominic Harvey
- Shilong Ye
- Leonard Weiss
- Louis Sharpe

== Patrons ==
- Hazel Hawke (1983-1991)
- Larry Sitsky

== Alumni ==
- David Branson
- Katy Gallagher
- Katherine Gibbney
- Robert Gladstones
- Stephen Leek
- Jennfier Owens
- Howard Penny
- Bree van Reyk
- Sally Whitwell

== Works commissioned by the CYO ==
- My Canberra by Marian Budos
- To Peg Mantle, With Thanks by Bree van Reyk

== World premiers performed by the CYO ==
- My Canberra -Symphony No. 2 by Marian Budos (30 Nov 2013)
- Cognatus: three movements for youth orchestra by Mark Grandison (Nov 2005)
- Nights in Arabia: for viola soloist and orchestra by Katia Tiutiunnik (21 Mar 1999)
- A Canticle of Light by Judith Clingan (1976)
- Figheadaireached by Alexander Hunter (2019)
