= Intervarsity Choral Festival (Australia) =

Universities choral organization

Coordinates: 27°29′50.81″S 153°00′47.72″E

Australian Intervarsity Choral Festival
- Genre: Choral Festival
- Frequency: Annual
- Location: Rotates between Australian cities
- Inaugurated: 1950
- Previous event: Adelaide 2019
- Next event: Sydney 2025
- Participants: 60–200
- Website: www.aicsa.org.au

The Australian Intervarsity Choral Festival is an annual event in which members of university choirs from all state capitals of Australia and the national capital Canberra meet for two weeks to rehearse, socialise and perform combined concerts. The Festival also serves as the annual conference of the member choirs of AICSA, the Australian Intervarsity Choral Societies Association

== Overview ==
The festival is hosted by the AICSA choirs in a particular city on a rotational basis, the roster being maintained by AICSA's governing body, the Australian Intervarsity Choral Council (AIVCC). Most IVCFs have involved between 100 and 300 festival participants (choristers), who perform one to three concerts over the course of about two weeks, often accompanied by a major symphonic orchestra.

An example is the festival in 2008. IVCF was hosted by the Sydney University Musical Society in association with other university choirs including Macquarie University Singers, and the Music Society of the University of Technology (Sydney), and performed a concert of English works including Thomas Tallis' 40-part motet Spem in Alium and Ralph Vaughan Williams' Serenade to Music, and one of Australian works including a commission from Anne Boyd (see Promotion of Australian Composition below).

=== Recent festivals ===
- IVCF – held in Hobart in 1975 presented Rossini's Petite messe solennelle conducted by John Lanchbery
- 62nd IVCF – held in Perth in July 2011. Works performed include a rare Australian performance of Tchaikovsky's All-Night Vigil, an Australian première performance of Desenclos's Messe de Requiem, Alain's Requiem, and works by Fauré and Bortniansky.
- 63rd IVCF – held in Melbourne in June–July 2012. Works performed include Berlioz's Requiem, Brahms's Requiem, and a specially-commissioned work by Australian composer Matthew Orlovich.
- 64th IVCF – held in Adelaide in January 2013. It featured a performance of Rachmaninoff's All-Night Vigil, as well as pieces by Whitacre, Lauridsen, Z. Randall Stroope, and Australian composer Nigel Butterley.
- 65th IVCF – held in Brisbane in July 2014 presented two major concerts. The first was a performance of Johann Sebastian Bach's Mass in B minor. The second contained pieces by Duruflé, Sisask, Tavener, O'Regan and Whitacre.
- 66th IVCF – held in Sydney in January 2015 presented Verdi's Requiem.
- 67th IVCF – held in Canberra in July 2016 presented Bruckner's Mass in E minor and Parry's Four Part Songs, as well as a specially-commissioned work by Australian composer Michael Winikoff, conducted by Leonard Weiss.
- 68th IVCF – held in Perth in January 2017 presented Puccini's Messa, and works by Victoria, Brahms and Busto.
- 69th IVCF – held in Melbourne in January 2018 presented Elgar's Light of Life, and works by Parry, Brahms, Vaughan Williams and Michael Winikoff.
- 70th IVCF – held in Adelaide in January 2019 presented a concert titled "Northern Lights", including the Australian premiere of Kim André Arnesen's "Magnificat"
- 71st IVCF was to be held in Brisbane in July 2020 but was deferred owing to the COVID-19 pandemic.
- The IVCF scheduled to be held in Sydney 2021 (expected to be 72nd IVCF) thus became 71st IVCF.

== History ==
The first Australian InterVarsity Choral Festival took place in 1950 when the Sydney University Musical Society (SUMS) hosted the Melbourne University Choral Society (MUCS) for a week-long rehearsal camp culminating in a combined concert. Other university choirs joined over the years, with all State and Territory capitals (except Darwin in the Northern Territory) having at least one member choir by 1973. The IVCF has since become the largest regularly occurring choral festival in Australia.

From 1975 on, when the 26th IVCF performed Verdi's Requiem in the then recently opened Sydney Opera House, IVCFs have striven to perform large-scale works to high standards with professional orchestras where appropriate and available. The 37th IVCF (Brisbane, 1986) was the first to work with its state's peak professional orchestra, the then Queensland Symphony Orchestra, the major work on the program being Herbert Howells' Hymnus Paradisi. Two years later (1988), to celebrate Australia's bicentennial, the 39th IVCF collaborated with the Sydney Philharmonia and the Sydney Symphony Orchestra under the baton of Charles Dutoit to perform Mahler's Symphony number 8 ("Symphony of a Thousand"), again in the Sydney Opera House.

More recently, the 55th IVCF (Perth, 2004) took part in the Perth International Arts Festival to commemorate the 100th anniversary of the death of Antonín Dvořák by performing his Stabat Mater with the Prague Chamber Orchestra under Australian conductor Graham Abbott.

== Promotion of Australian composition ==
IVCFs have a long if intermittent tradition of performance of works by Australian composers. At least sixteen performances since 1962 have included works commissioned by the festival, including Blue Gum Forest, composed by Matthew Orlovich for the 60th IVCF in 2009, Missa Pacifica by Anne Boyd, commissioned for the Sydney IVCF in 2008, and David Cassat's "Flesh to Stone" for semichorus and divisi main chorus, commissioned by the 56th IVCF (Melbourne) in 2005.

Many other InterVarsity Choral Festivals have included premiere performances of works, including Paul Stanhope's "Pirramimma" for three choirs and string ensemble, performed in 2007 in Brisbane through a collaboration between the 58th IVCF and the Bonyi International Youth Festival.

Australian Intervarsity Choral Societies Association
- Abbreviation: AICSA
- Formation: 1973; 53 years ago
- Purpose: Musical and social
- Region served: Australia
- Members: University choral societies and student choirs
- Website: www.aicsa.org.au

== Australian Intervarsity Choral Societies Association ==
The organization behind the IVCF is the Australian Intervarsity Choral Societies Association (AICSA), which is a non-profit that represents each of the affiliated local choirs, with a purpose of encouraging choral music within tertiary academic settings. While officially formed in 1973, organizational cooperation to create the IVCF has existed since 1950. Since being officially formed, AICSA has acquired an increased role. Today, besides assisting in the organisation of the festival, it sponsors a database catalogue of music held by individual choirs, archives at the National Library of Australia, and internet resources via aicsa.org.au. The newsletter Erato was published 3-5 times a year from 1971 to 2012.

=== Member societies ===
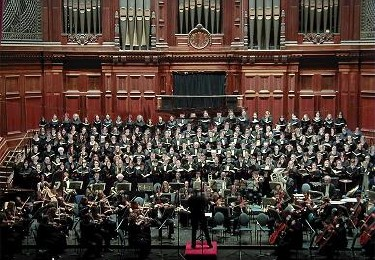
Melbourne University Choral Society (a founding member) singing Carmina Burana

As of September 2012, member societies were:

- ACT

- Australian National University Choral Society (SCUNA), Canberra.

- New South Wales

- Musical Society of the University of Technology Sydney (MuscUTS), Sydney.
- Macquarie University Singers (MUS), Sydney.
- Sydney University Madrigal Society (MADS), Sydney.
- Sydney University Musical Society (SUMS), Sydney.

- Queensland

- Queensland University Musical Society (QUMS), Brisbane.

- South Australia

- Adelaide University Choral Society (AUCS), Adelaide.
- Flinders University Choral Society (FUCS), Adelaide.

- Tasmania

- Tasmania University Musical Society (TUMS), Hobart.

- Victoria

- Monash University Choral Society (MonUCS), Melbourne.
- RMIT Occasional Choral Society (ROCS), Melbourne.
- La Trobe University Choral Society (LatUCS), Melbourne

- Western Australia

- Perth Undergraduate Choral Society (PUCS), Perth.
