= Roland Peelman =

Australian conductor

Roland Sylvester Peelman, AM is an Australian conductor and musical director.

Peelman was born in a small village near Ghent, Belgium. He studied in Ghent at the conservatorium and Ghent University, and then in Cologne, Germany.

Peelman first visited Australia with his wife in 1982. They returned not long after with their two children, officially emigrating in 1984. When he first moved, he lived in the South Australian city of Mount Gambier where he was appointed as musical director of the Mount Gambier City Band. Since this time, Peelman has worked with Australian organisations including Opera Australia, the Australian Chamber Orchestra, Opera Queensland, and vocal a cappella group The Song Company, of which he was artistic director between 1990 and 2015.

Peelman is known to be a strong advocate for new Australian music, and in 2015 was appointed artistic director of the Canberra International Music Festival.

Peelman was appointed an honorary Member of the Order of Australia in the 2020 Australia Day Honours for "significant service to music."
