= Robert Davidson (composer) =

Australian composer

Robert Davidson is an Australian composer and lecturer in music at the University of Queensland.

== Education ==
He holds a Bachelor of Music from the University of Queensland (UQ), a Graduate Diploma in Music from Griffith University, and a PhD from the University of Queensland. He studied composition with Terry Riley in 1995 following studies with Philip Bračanin at UQ.

== Musical career ==
He was a bassist in the Opera Australia, Sydney Symphony and Queensland Symphony orchestras.

Since 1997, Davidson has directed the post-classical quintet Topology, with whom he plays double bass and occasionally sings. He is co-artistic direction of the organisation.

Davidson's works focus on relationships between speech and music, often including video elements. His works have been commissioned and performed by numerous international artists, such as the Brodsky Quartet, Australian String Quartet, Karin Schaupp, Southern Cross Soloists, Paul Dresher Ensemble (San Francisco), and Newspeak (New York). He has also collaborated with Kate Miller-Heidke, Megan Washington, Katie Noonan, TaikOz and Trichotomy.

Some of his most well-known works using speech and music include "Not Now, Not Ever!" for choir with then prime minister of Australia Julia Gillard's 2012 Misogyny Speech, and "Big Decisions", which tells of the Whitlam dismissal.

== Academic career ==
As of 2022, Davidson is a senior lecturer in composition at UQ. He is also described as a UQ expert in speech intonation, music and language, popular music, contemporary art music, cross-genre music, and music performance. His research interests include the use of artificial intelligence in music.

== Recognition ==
Davidson was a finalist in the Art Music Awards in 2013 (Instrumental Work of the Year) and 2019 (Vocal/Choral Work of the Year).
