= Judith Clingan =

Australian composer and conductor

Judith Clingan AM
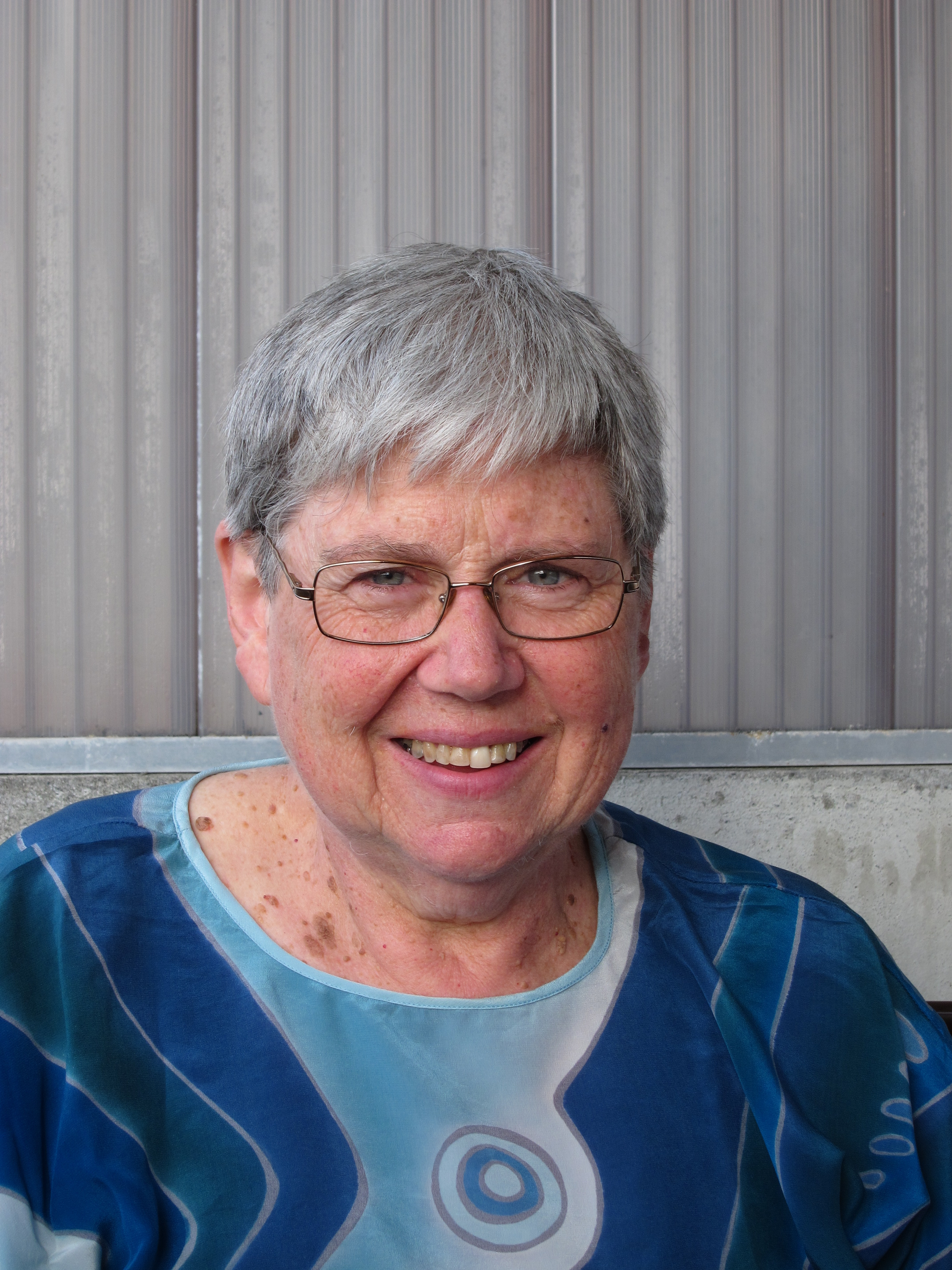

Background information
- Born: Judith Ann Clingan; 19 January 1945 (age 81); Sydney, Australia
- Genres: Choral
- Occupations: Composer, singer and educator
- Instrument: Vocals
- Years active: 1966–present
- Website: judithclingan.net

Judith Ann Clingan AM (born 19 January 1945) is an Australian composer, conductor, performer and music educator. Since 1997, she has been the Director of Wayfarers Australia (formerly Waldorf Wayfarers) Australia Wide Choir.

== Early life ==
Clingan was born on 19 January 1945, in Sydney, New South Wales to Victor Lawrence Clingan and Marian Dorothy Tasker. She was educated at Hornsby Girls' High School, the University of Sydney, the University of New South Wales and the Australian National University (ANU).

Clingan moved to Canberra with her family in 1963, and graduated from the ANU in 1966. In 1967 she founded the Canberra Children's Choir and began composing music for SSA voices. She studied voice, bassoon and composition at the Canberra School of Music (now ANU School of Music) She studied music education at the Zoltan Kodaly Pedagogical Institute of Music in Kecskemet (Hungary) from 1981–1982.

== Career ==
In 1969 she founded the Summer Music Schools for Children, known as the Young Music Society from 1975. In 1983 she founded Gaudeamus Music and Performing Arts (now Music For Canberra). She was the director of Gaudeamus for eleven years and during this time she remained a composer, writing choral and music theatre works for the group to perform. In 1990 members of Gaudeamus performed her music theatre work Kakadu at the International Society of Music Educators conference in Finland.

In 1991 she began her involvement in Steiner education and since then has written many short choral and music theatre pieces for Steiner students.

Clingan founded Voicebox Youth Opera when working in South Australia from 1994–1996, and directed the Canberra branch of Voicebox from 1997 - 2002. She composed many music theatre pieces during this time. In 1994 she founded Imagine Music Theatre.

In 1997 she founded the choir Wayfarers Australia and the Canberra vocal group The Variables.

She has been the recipient of many awards, fellowships and grants, including in 1986 a Membership of the Order of Australia for services to music, Churchill Fellowship, Australia Council Composer Fellowship, ANU Creative Arts Fellowship, artsACT Creative Artists Fellowship, Canberra Times Artist of the Year, Sounds Australian award for her composition Kakadu, funding from the Australia Council, Arts ACT and Arts SA, commissions for original compositions and numerous residencies in Australia.

Clingan is the director of Wayfarers Australia and the former director of Imagine Music Theatre.

== Selected works ==
- Puer natus = The boy that is born : liturgical drama for Christmas, 1968
- A Canticle of light, 1976
- The Lorax (words: Dr. Seuss), 1979
- Lux Mundi, 1985
- Rime of the Ancient Mariner (with Stephanos Malikides), 1985
- Peter Pandemonium (based on J. M. Barrie's story), 1985
- Modal magic : seven songs for a cappella children's choir, 1986
- Francis, or Singing is believing: a mini-opera in three acts, 1986
- Nganbra : a Canberra canticle (libretto: Anthony Hill), 1988
- Terra beata - terra infirma, 1989
- Seven Deadly Sins, 1990
- Kakadu (words: Marian Clingan), 1990
- Birds' Noel, 1990
- Marco : an opera for young people based on the travels of Marco Polo, 1990
- Songs of solitude, 1991
- Mass of hope, 1992
- Mythical beasts, 1992
- Stony tunes, 1994
- A Pawn in the Game, 1995
- Birth pangs : for women's choir (words: David Adam), 1996
- Seasons of the Soul for carillon - written 1997 for Women’s Composing Festival
- Moomin Magic (based on Finn Family Moomintroll by Tove Jansson), 1999
- The Grandfather Clock (based on a book by Tony Hill), 2001
- Spiritus Sanctus Australis, 2001–2002
- Endangered! 2015
- The Little Prince 2016
- Heavenly Grandfather’s Banquet 2016
- Harmonia Mundi 2017
- A Lake for Canberra, 2017, commissioned for carillon by the Australian National University and the National Capital Authority
- The Threshold, 2023, New music theatre looking at Ageing and the End of Life
- The Prophet 2024

== Books ==
- The Compleat Chorister 1970
- So Good a Thing 1980
- Music is for Everyone 1983
- Songs of the Tree of Life vol 2 1996
- Songs of the Tree of Life vol.1 1998
- Play On! 2017
- Together-Primus 2022
- Harmonia Mundi 2019
