= Canberra International Music Festival =

Music festival based in Canberra, Australia

The Canberra International Music Festival is a music festival based in Canberra, Australia. It was founded by Ursula Callus (1939–2001), former President of Pro Musica Incorporated.

The first Festival was originally called the Canberra International Chamber Music Festival and was held in April 1994. It won the Canberra Critics Circle Award for Music Innovation. Since 1997 the Festival has been an annual event, and in 2008 it was renamed the Canberra International Music Festival.

From 2005 to 2008 it went through a period of rapid expansion, paid for by Arts patron Barbara Blackman and now presents around 30 concerts annually. Until his death in 2014, Peter Sculthorpe was composer laureate of the festival and was the subject of a retrospective in 2009, where his opera/music theatre work Rites of Passage was remounted for the first time in 35 years. This focus was timed to coincide with his 80th birthday.

Other significant commissions and premieres in the Festival include Arvo Pärt's Fourth Symphony, Henryk Górecki's ...songs are sung... for string orchestra, the concert premiere of Einojuhani Rautavaara's The Gift of the Magi and Peter Sculthorpe's "Shining Island". In recent Festivals, the CIMF has featured a Composer-In-Residence. In recent Festivals, the CIMF facilitates young musicians from around Australia to participate in masterclasses, and collaborate with and perform alongside international artists from a diverse range of backgrounds.

In 2019, Canberra Youth Orchestra alumnus Bree van Reyk created a new piece for the Canberra Youth Orchestra which was performed at that years Canberra International Music Festival.

== Artistic Director ==
Previous Artistic Directors of the Festival have included Ursula Callus, Nicole Canham and Christopher Latham.

The Canberra International Music Festivals current artistic director is Roland Peelman.
