= Graeme Morton (musician) =

Australian composer and conductor

Graeme Morton AM
- Citizenship: Australian
- Education: Master of Music (Organ) (University of Queensland)
- Occupations: Conductor and composer
- Employer: University of Queensland
- Organizations: Brisbane Chamber Choir; St John's Anglican Cathedral, Brisbane; The Australian Voices
- Spouse: Barbara Morton
- Awards: Churchill Fellowship; 2003 Australian Prime Minister's Medal; 2011 Brisbane Lord Mayor's Australia Day Cultural Award; Royal School of Church Music Fellowship
- Honours: Member of the Order of Australia

Graeme Morton AM is an Australian composer and conductor, currently the Director of the Brisbane Chamber Choir and Director of Music at St John's Anglican Cathedral. He is formerly the Director of Music at St Peters Lutheran College, where he founded the St Peters Chorale. Graeme is also a Senior Lecturer, Choral Conducting Fellow and Master of Music Program Convenor at the University of Queensland's School of Music.
