= Sydney Youth Orchestra =

Youth orchestra based in Sydney, Australia

The Sydney Youth Orchestra
- Youth orchestra
- Founded: 1973 (53 years ago)
- Location: Haymarket, New South Wales, Australia
- Concert hall: Verbrugghen Hall
- Principal conductor: Stanley Dodds
- Website: thesyo.com.au; syo.com.au

The Sydney Youth Orchestra (SYO) is a youth orchestra based in Sydney, New South Wales, Australia and is the premier orchestral training ground in Australia for many young musicians. Since its founding in 1973 by Peter Seymour, a legendary music educator, it has provided orchestral training to thousands of young musicians (aged between 6 and 25 years) whom are required to audition annually to be placed in orchestras and ensembles (say: on-song-bulls) best to meet their stage of development as a musician.

It is part of the larger organisation called Sydney Youth Orchestra Inc, which provides a pathway for young musicians from beginner to pre-professional. Sydney Youth Orchestra Inc is also the largest orchestral training provider in Australia. SYO receives less than 10% of its income through funding from state government grants, and 35% from student participation fees.

== Ensembles ==
SYO is made up of 9 ensembles split up into 4 groups (Prep, Stage 1, Stage 2 and Stage 3) and has 6 major stand-alone orchestras.

=== SYO Strings ===
- SYO Prep (for beginner string players)
- Stage 1 Yellow
- Stage 1 Orange
- Stage 2 Red
- Stage 2 Blue
- Stage 3 Silver
- Stage 3 Purple

=== Orchestras ===
- Peter Seymour Orchestra (PSO)
  The Peter Seymour Orchestra (PSO), named after the founder of the Sydney Youth Orchestra Association.
- Symphonic Wind Orchestra (SWO)
  The Symphonic Wind Orchestra (SWO) provides training for over 70 young wind, brass and percussion musicians from across NSW.
- Western Sydney Youth Orchestra (WSYO)
  Established in 2017 to support orchestra music in Western Sydney.
- Richard Gill Chamber Orchestra (RGCO)
  The Richard Gill Chamber Orchestra (formerly known as Stage 4 Strings) is the springboard to the Symphonic Orchestral Program.
- SYO Philharmonic (SYOP)
  SYOP is the second most senior ensemble, composed of 70 young musicians.
- Sydney Youth Orchestra (The.SYO)
  SYO is the top orchestra of the Sydney Youth Orchestras Inc family. Largely comprising pre-professional players aged 18-25, many of Australia’s finest musicians have performed in this orchestra as they transition into the professional music industry.

== Alumni ==
Since 1973, SYO has over 5,500 alumni. Many of them still take musical occupations, with some also taking business and corporate fields.

=== Conducting Fellowship ===
- Sam Weller (2017-19)
- Leonard Weiss (Create NSW Orchestral Conductor Fellowship, 2021-22)
- Aija Draguns (Create NSW Orchestral Conductor Fellowship, 2022-23)

== See also ==
- List of youth orchestras
