= Nicholas Milton =

Australian conductor and violinist (born 1967)

Nicholas Christopher Milton AM (born 1967 in Sydney) is an Australian conductor and violinist.

== Career ==
Milton has three brothers and all three studied violin with Gillian McIntyre. Milton also studied violin with Robert Pikler and Harry Curby, graduating from the Sydney Conservatorium of Music. He accepted a scholarship at Michigan State University, where he studied violin, conducting, music theory, and Eastern philosophy. He lectured at Boston University and the Juilliard School, and was artist-in-residence at the City University of New York. Prior to his career as a conductor, Milton was concertmaster of the Adelaide Symphony Orchestra and violinist for the Macquarie Trio, performing with pianist Kathryn Selby.

Milton has served as chief conductor of the Canberra Symphony Orchestra and the Willoughby Symphony in Australia, and the Orchestra of the State Theatre of Saarland (Saarländisches Staatstheater) in Germany. He has been permanent guest conductor of the Zagreb Philharmonic Orchestra and principal conductor of the Croatian Chamber Orchestra. Since 2018, he has been artistic director and chief conductor of the Göttinger Symphonieorchester. Milton is scheduled to conclude his tenure with the Göttinger Symphonieorchester at the close of the 2026/2027 season.

== Awards and honours ==
Milton's awards include the Queen Elizabeth II Silver Jubilee Medal, the New York Master's Award in Conducting, and the Gold Medal from the Sleider International Violin Competition.

Milton won the 1999 Symphony Australia Conductor of the Year Competition and was a prize-winner in the International Competition of Young Conductors Lovro von Matačić. In 2001 he was awarded the Centenary Medal, "For service to Australian society and the advancement of music". Milton received the 2014/15 College of Music Distinguished Alumni Award from Michigan State University. In 2015, he was invited by the Australian prime minister to join the Australia–Germany Advisory Group. In 2016 he was appointed a Member of the Order of Australia (AM), "for significant service to the arts, particularly to classical orchestral music performance, as a musician, conductor and artistic director".

Milton was nominated for a 2016 Grammy Award in the category Grammy Award for Best Classical Instrumental Solo for conducting the recording with Joseph Moog of Piano Concertos by Edvard Grieg and Moritz Moszkowski.

Cultural offices
Preceded by Richard Gill	Chief conductor, Canberra Symphony Orchestra; 2007–2020	Succeeded by Jessica Cottis
Preceded by Christoph-Mathias Mueller	Chief conductor, Göttinger Symphonieorchester; 2018–present	Succeeded by incumbent
