= Charmian Gadd =

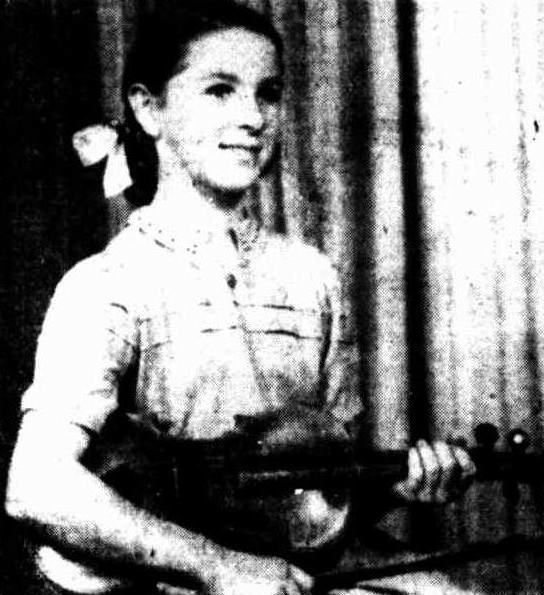
- Charmian Gadd aged 11 (1953)

Background information
- Born: 1942 (age 82–83); Ourimbah, New South Wales, Australia
- Genres: classical
- Occupation(s): violinist, teacher
- Instrument: violin
- Years active: c1950-
- Spouse: Richard Goldner

Charmian Gadd OAM (born 1942) is an Australian violinist and teacher.

== Career ==
Gadd grew up in Ourimbah, New South Wales, and learned to play violin at three years old. Her family listened to Alfred Ernest Floyd's Music Lover’s Hour on ABC Radio, and performances by classical musicians.

She won prizes in the City of Sydney Eisteddfod, and was enrolled in the Conservatorium High School in 1954. In 1962 she won the ABC Young Performers Awards for her violin playing.

She moved to Sydney to study at the Sydney Conservatorium of Music, where she graduated in 1960, and took further lessons in violin with Richard Goldner.

In 1966 she moved to the United States with her former teacher Richard Goldner. They taught at Pittsburgh and Washington (state) and married in 1970, when he was 62, and returned to Australia permanently in 1981, after occasionally visiting on tour.

Gadd joined the staff at the Canberra School of Music in 1986 as lecturer. She performed as part of The Macquarie Trio with pianist Kathryn Selby and cellist Michael Goldschlager, who formed in 1993 and were considered one of Australia's premier chamber music groups.

After Goldner died in 1991, the Richard Goldner Award was founded and Gadd is patron of the competition.

She was awarded the Medal of the Order of Australia (OAM) for service to music in 2022.

== Awards ==
1958 - ABC Young Performers Awards - Violin (finalist)

1962 - ABC Young Performers Awards - Violin (won)
