= Martin Lass =

American musician and astrologer (born 1958)

- Born: 6 August 1958 (age 67); Chicago, Illinois, U.S.
- Occupations: Musician; composer; violinist; astrologer
- Website: https://martinlass.com/

Martin Allan Lass (born August 6, 1958) is an American violinist and sometime astrologer, who grew up, and started his performance career, in Australia. Lass was a practising professional astrologer from the late 1980s until the mid-2000s. He has written astrological books and articles, and given presentations to astrological societies.

== Biography ==
Martin Lass was born in Chicago in 1958 to Earle Lass (born 1931) and Ruth (born 1933); he has two siblings. At the age of eight, he became interested in playing violin after seeing Yehudi Menuhin on a TV show. The Lass family migrated to Australia in 1969.

He studied violin at the Sydney Conservatorium with John Gould, Robert Pikler and Lim Kek Tjiang. After graduating, he joined the Australian Chamber Orchestra. He also played with the Sydney Symphony Orchestra, and the Australian Opera and Ballet Orchestra (the Elizabethan Sydney Orchestra).

Lass was a contestant on Bert Newton's TV talent quest, New Faces, in 1982, winning the Grand Final and People Choice awards. Then a touring career ensued, in which he combined classical, gypsy and popular genres including jazz, bluegrass and Celtic. He has also written much original material. He appeared as the Fiddler in two seasons of Fiddler on the Roof in Sydney.

In the 1980s he was a frequent television performer, including regular appearances on The Midday Show with Ray Martin and Hey Hey It's Saturday. He supported major stars such as Luciano Pavarotti, Julio Iglesias, Kamahl and Joan Baez. He won the Mo Award for Instrumental Act for eight years consecutively, from 1984 to 1991. By January 1989 Lass had, "developed a stage show which combines unique stage clothes with a powerful stage presence. His playing is backed by four other musicians, who also feature in their own right as a band. His wife plays synthesisers and is the musical director." He was voted the Variety Club Artist of the Year 1990. According to The Canberra Times' Vanessa Johnson, "[he] has revolutionised the classics, playing music which links Bach, Vivaldi and Beethoven to jazz, country and rock 'n' roll."

Lass returned to the United States in the 2000s, for ten years, and has periodically returned to Australia. In 2002 he recorded his ninth album, Sonnet, at Galactic Studios in Nyack, New York. For that album he provided art direction, design, audio engineer, keyboards, mastering, mixing engineer, piano, producer, and violin. AllMusic's Alex Henderson rated it at three-out-of-five stars and explained, "[it] is an example of the more classical-influenced new age, and even though the material falls short of mind-blowing, all of it is pleasant and sincere."

Martin Lass's piano accompanist is his Dutch-born wife Inge, who made her Carnegie Hall debut at age 14 and studied at the New England Conservatory from age 16. They have three children and two grandchildren. Lass was a practising professional astrologer from the late 1980s to the mid-2000s. He has written astrological books and articles, and given presentations to astrological societies. His book, Chiron – Healing Body and Soul, has become a definitive text about Chiron, the "planet" of wounding and healing. In addition to this, in Sydney, for eight years, Lass was a student of an esoteric school of self-knowledge under George M. Adie (1901–1989), a disciple of George Gurdjieff and P. D. Ouspensky.

== Compositions ==
- "Stories of Ray Bradbury" (1981) – Sydney Symphony Orchestra, Melbourne Symphony Orchestra, Adelaide Symphony Orchestra & BBC Philharmonic
- "Six Pieces for String Orchestra" (1980) – West Australian Symphony Orchestra under Dobbs Franks
- "Four Pieces for Violin and Piano 1980" – The Seymour Group directed by Vincent Plush, performed by John Harding and David Stanhope (pianist), Sunday, 22 June 1980
- NASA – Soundtrack for NASA's video, “3 Years of Sun in 3 Minutes” (Song: “A Lady's Errand of Love”) ( @ 0:19s)
- US Music Library: Inter Music Library – Trailer for re-release of classic French film, La régle du jeu (The Rules of the Game) (1939) (Song: “Bach-analia”) (2007) ( @ 0:53s)
- 11 songs from CD release, “Sonnet” (classical crossover style) (2001) – Radio airplay by over 600 radio stations worldwide. Achieved No. 13 on the US New Age Voice charts.

== Discography ==
=== Studio albums ===
List of albums, with selected chart positions
Title	Album details	Peak chart positions
Title	Album details	AUS
Gypsy Airs	Released: 1983; Label: EMI (EMC-2768); Format: LP	—
String Sensations	Released: February 1986; Label: G & R, WEA (600139-1); Format: LP	42
One Love	Released: May 1988; Label: Paganini Promotions (PAG 790511); Format: LP, cassette	83
Bach to the Future	Released: 1989; Label: Paganini Promotions (PAG 793491); Format: LP	—
Songs Without Words	Released: April 1991; Label: Paganini Promotions (CD PAG 796359); Format: CD	33
One Love	Released: May 1997; Label: MRA (MR60022); Format: CD	96
Full circle	Released: 1998; Label: MRA; Format: CD	—
The Gypsy Fiddler	Released: 1999; Label: Galactic Music; Format: CD	—
Sonnet	Released: 2002; Label: MRA; Format: CD	—
Take a Bow: The Ultimate Collection	Released: 2011; Label: Fanfare; Format: CD	—
Home for Christmas	Released: 2014; Label: EMI; Format: CD	—

== Awards ==
=== Mo Awards ===
The Australian Entertainment Mo Awards (commonly known informally as the Mo Awards), were annual Australian entertainment industry awards. They recognise achievements in live entertainment in Australia from 1975 to 2016. Martin Lass won 7 awards in that time.

Year	Nominee / work	Award	Result (wins only)
1984	Martin Lass	Instrumentalist of the Year	Won
1985	Martin Lass	Instrumentalist of the Year	Won
1986	Martin Lass	Instrumentalist of the Year	Won
1987	Martin Lass	Instrumentalist of the Year	Won
1988	Martin Lass	Instrumental Act of the Year	Won
1989	Martin Lass	Instrumental Act of the Year	Won
1990	Martin Lass	Instrumental Act of the Year	Won

== Bibliography ==
- Lass, Martin (1997). Star Traveller: A Planetary Guidebook to Your Spiritual Growth and Evolution, with Messages from the Living Planets. Sydney: M. Lass. ISBN 978-0-646-31235-4.
- — (2005), Chiron: Healing Body & Soul (1st ed.), Woodbury, Minnesota: Llewellyn Publications, ISBN 978-0-7387-0717-4
