= George Ellis (composer) =

Australian composer and conductor (born 1964)

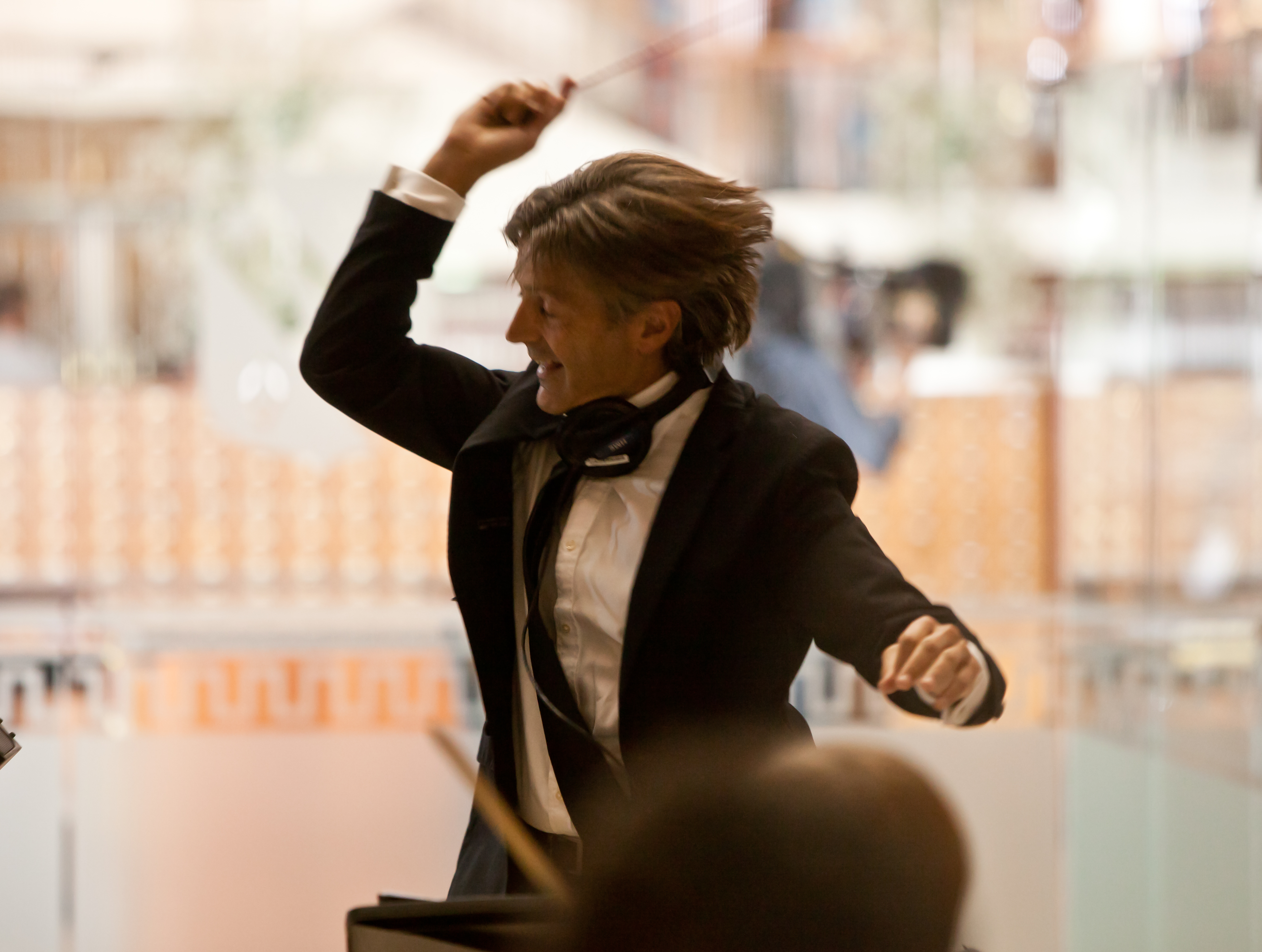
- Ellis conducting

Background information
- Also known as: The Big G
- Born: 12 February 1964 (age 62); Penrith, New South Wales, Australia
- Origin: Sydney, Australia
- Genres: Orchestral music, classical music, popular music (pop/rock), jazz, disco
- Occupations: Conductor, composer, crchestrator, musical arranger, education concert presenter
- Instruments: Piano, cello, guitar, bass guitar, drums
- Years active: 1990–present
- Website: www.georgeellis.com.au

George Ellis (born 12 February 1964) is an Australian conductor, composer and orchestrator. He presents concerts for international events with a broad range of styles from classical to pop/rock and jazz as well as presenting orchestral concerts for young audiences. He also lectures in conducting at the Sydney Conservatorium of Music, and is a regular presenter of Sonic Journey for ABC Radio Sydney’s program with Simon Marnie.

== Early years ==
George Ellis was born in Penrith in Western Sydney to Greek-Australian parents. As a child, he learnt to read music and took lessons in music theory and harmony. At high school, he formed a rock band, The Affections, for which he wrote songs and played bass guitar. The band was signed to Deluxe Records and were stablemates of INXS. The band played support for groups including Cold Chisel, Mental As Anything, Moving Pictures, The Angels and The Church.

== Education ==
Ellis completed the Higher School Certificate at Fort Street High School in Sydney's inner west. After The Affections disbanded, he then pursued the study of classical music full-time at the Sydney Conservatorium of Music (1984). Upon graduating with a Bachelor of Music Education as Student of the Year (1987), he travelled to the USA where he studied composition at Carnegie-Mellon University, Pittsburgh (1988) and then conducting at the University of Colorado, Boulder (1989) where he gained a master's degree. He has studied orchestral conducting as part of a Doctor of Musical Arts degree at the Sydney Conservatorium of Music where he lectures in conducting.

== Conducting work ==
Upon return to Sydney from the United States in the early 1990s, Ellis made the finals of the inaugural ABC Young Conductors Mastercourse (1994) and was invited to conduct Cesar Franck’s Symphonic Variations with the Tasmanian Symphony Orchestra in Hobart, marking his professional conducting debut (1995). He became assistant conductor to Brian Stacey in the Sydney and Melbourne production of The Secret Garden, starring Anthony Warlow and Marina Prior, for the Gordon Frost Organisation (1996). Ellis conducted This Is the Moment performed by Hugh Jackman with orchestral and choral accompaniment for the NRL Grand Final pre-match entertainment at Sydney Olympic Stadium. (1999). He was to conduct at the same occasion with Kelly Clarkson in 2011 and OneRepublic in 2019.

In 1999, Ellis auditioned for the Sydney Organising Committee for the Olympic Games to conduct for the Sydney Olympic Games. Musical director of SOCOG, Max Lambert, appointed Ellis to conduct the Olympic Hymn with the Sydney Symphony Orchestra and the Millennium Choir for the opening ceremony and the Australian and Greek National Anthems at the closing ceremony (2000). He was also the musical director of the Millennium Ensemble at the Athens Olympic Games in 2004. In 2001, conductor Simone Young appointed Ellis to be her assistant conductor for Opera Australia's production of La traviata at the Sydney Opera House. He was subsequently appointed associate conductor alongside Guy Noble for the Sydney and Melbourne production of Man of La Mancha, starring Anthony Warlow and Caroline O'Connor, for the Gordon Frost Organisation (2002). Ellis returned to the olympics in 2025, as musical director and conductor for the concert for the 25th Anniversary Celebration of the Sydney Olympic Games at Accor Stadium.

Ellis was the musical director of the Australia Day concerts held by the Premier of NSW at the Sydney International Convention and Exhibition Centre – arranging for and conducting artists including Alex Lloyd, David Campbell, Gang Gajang, Simon Burke, Deborah Conway, Clare Bowditch, Casey Donovan and Sneaky Sound System (2002 to 2012). He conducted orchestral and choral groups for the ARIA Awards at Qudos Bank Arena for the artists Amiel Daemion and Art vs. Science (2005, 2011). In 2006, he conducted an orchestral performance of "The Prayer" sung by Anthony Callea for the Australian visit by Queen Elizabeth II for the Commonwealth Games.

In 2007, Ellis was musical director of the Belvoir Street production of The Adventures of Snugglepot and Cuddlepie performed at the Sydney Festival, Perth International Music Festival and Adelaide Festival Theatre. He provided choral accompaniment for the Sydney Festival performance by Lou Reed at the State Theatre (2007). From 2007 to 2010, he was musical director of the Sydney Festival orchestral and choral concerts at Hyde Park working with singers including Jade McRae, Felicity Urquhart and Angie Hart. In the same year, he conducted the West Australian Symphony Orchestra in combination with the Australian rock band Augie March in two outdoor packed concerts in Perth's Kings Park. Over the years he has travelled internationally, guest-conducting with the Malaysian Philharmonic Orchestra in 2008, and for a performance of Beethoven's 9th Symphony at the Jakarta Arts Festival in 2009. He also toured the Australian Youth Symphony throughout Europe (including London, Paris, Vienna and Rome) and The USA (New York, Boston, Philadelphia and Los Angeles) (2010–2012).

In 2010, Ellis was musical director of the Production Company's Sugar (Some Like It Hot) at the State Theatre, Melbourne. In 2011, he provided the orchestra and conducted A Psychedelic Symphony – the concert celebrating The Church's 30th anniversary celebration concert at the Sydney Opera House. Ellis was invited to conduct the Magic of Disney orchestral concert for the Verge Arts Festival in the Great Hall, Sydney University, in 2012. He was the musical director of the orchestral and choral performances for The Lights of Christmas with images screened on the façade of St Mary's Cathedral and composed a new piece, The Light, for the occasion (2014–2016).

In 2013, Ellis conducted the world premiere of the Australian opera Somewhere Between the Sun and the Sky by Sophie Spargo and in 2014, he conducted performances of the American opera Little Women by Marc Adamo – both at the Sydney Conservatorium of Music.

He has been the musical director of the Greek Festival of Sydney orchestral and choral concerts featuring international soloists Dimitris Basis and Vasilis Lekkas at City Recital Hall, Sydney (2015–2019). In 2019, the festival toured nationally including Melbourne, Brisbane, Perth and Darwin. Ellis conducted national tours of Beatles Orchestrated (2016 to 2018) and performed the show at the Lost Picnic festival at the Domain, Sydney (2017). He has also been musical director of the Canberra Symphony Orchestra Symphony In the Park concerts featuring music by Queen, Fleetwood Mac, ABBA and the Bee Gees (2017–2019), with audiences of over 15,000 at each concert.

He performed in the orchestra he put together for the Hans Zimmer Australian national tour Hans Zimmer Revealed (Sydney, Melbourne, Brisbane, Perth) (2017). In 2018, he was musical director of Caroline O'Connor ’s From Broadway With Love concert at City Recital Hall, Sydney. Subsequently, in 2018, he conducted the Disco Spectacular orchestral concert at the Sydney Opera House featuring international vocalists Norma Jean Wright (of Chic), Cynthia Johnson, Kym Mazelle, Ultra Nate and Denise Pearson.

Ellis was appointed chief conductor of the Australian Session Orchestra (2019). He was appointed orchestral musical director of the Hooked on Classics concerts at the Sydney Opera House, Hamer Hall in Melbourne and Newcastle Civic Theatre (2019). He also conducted the orchestral Love Will Steer the Stars concert celebrating the 50th anniversary of the music of 1969 and A Tribute to George Michael (2019.) In 2020 he put together the orchestral performance of Sydney Rococo by Steve Kilbey, of rock band The Church, at City Recital Hall for the Sydney Festival.

Since 2020, the George Ellis Orchestra has performed around Australia for Metropolis Touring - presenting the orchestrated music of Queen, David Bowie, Fleetwood Mac, Elton John, George Michael, Frankie Valli and the Four Seasons, The Beatles and Metallica in venues including the State Theatre in Sydney, Palais Theatre in Melbourne and Adelaide Festival Theatre.

In 2021, George Ellis arranged the music and was musical director of the NRL Grand Final entertainment at Suncorp Stadium, Brisbane – where he worked with Ian Moss, from Cold Chisel, and Kate Miller-Heidke.

In 2022, he conducted Australian singer/songwriter Lior in a concert with the Canberra Symphony Orchestra featuring his latest compositions. He was also invited to be the guest conductor for the City Chamber Orchestra of Hong Kong where he conducted two concert series – The Fluteman Show and Chill Music – Orchestral Music from Iceland. He also conducted a live orchestral performance of Fantasia to the vision of the famous Disney film – including works like The Rite of Spring by Stravinsky. He also conducted the world premiere of ‘Force Majeur’ – concerto for Piano and Orchestra by highly esteemed composer Elena Kats-Chernin.

In 2023, he conducted the great Kate Ceberano in concert with the George Ellis Orchestra. He continued to tour around Australia conducting orchestral concerts of music by Pink Floyd and Hans Zimmer. He went on a national tour with The Best of the Bee Gees band to perform the music of the Bee Gees – including Colin ‘Smiley’ Peterson – the original drummer of the Bee Gees. And was invited back by the City of Chamber Orchestra of Hong Kong to conduct a return season of the previous year's programs.

In 2024, he premiered an orchestral concert at the Tamworth Country Music Festival – conducting the George Ellis Orchestra for artists including Troy Cassar-Daley, Fanny Lumsden and Amber Lawrence. He went on a national tour conducting the symphonies of American current classical composer Philip Glass – Heroes and Low. He also conducted Axion Esti, the monumental oratorio for large choir, orchestra, vocal soloists and popular music instruments by Greece's great composer Mikis Theodorakis. He also conducted the Australian premiere of The Carnival of the Dinosaurs, by Australian-born Thomas Woods, who is music director of the Regensburg Opera Theatre in Germany. And he conducted the orchestra for Newcastle's popular Star Struck program – for a rigorous program of four concerts in two days.

In 2025, he has so-far guest-conducted the Canberra Symphony Orchestra for a disco-themed concert for the orchestra's program called Music By the River, featuring international vocalist from New York, Mig Ayesa. He will also conduct his piece Mimi's Symphony for a week of concerts at the Sydney Opera House with his collaborator Justine Clarke narrating the much-loved orchestral story. They will also present this piece at the Canberra Theatre later in the year. He also has conducting work at the Sydney Conservatorium of Music where he will work with the New Music Ensemble. He travelled to New Zealand to conduct performances with The Best of the Bee Gees in Auckland and Wellington. Also, he conducted the New Music Orchestra at the Sydney Conservatorium of Music for a concert of original music by Sydney Conservatorium resident composers, and conducted the orchestra for the Star Struck concert series in Newcastle.

In 2026, he has so far Conducted ‘Orchestral Country’ concert at the Tamworth Country Music Festival; conducted ‘The Music of Queen Orchestrated’ with the Canberra Symphony Orchestra; and conducted the ‘Best of the Bee Gees Orchestrated’ with the Manila Symphony Orchestra in The Philippines.

== Composition and screen ==
In 1990, Ellis' Pop Mass received first prize in the Orchestral and Choral Composition section of Sydney Eisteddfod – it was premiered in Boulder Colorado, USA, which Ellis conducted. He composed The Australian Accord for the Australia Day concerts held by the NSW premier at the Sydney International Convention and Exhibition Centre (2005). Ellis was commissioned to compose Celebration Overture for the 10th anniversary of the Malaysian Philharmonic Orchestra which was performed at the Petronas Towers, Kuala Lumpur (2008). The Light was composed for The Lights of Christmas festival in Sydney and received 21 performances (2015). Ellis composed the piece Swinging in E Minor for Bruce Beresford's film Ladies In Black (2018). He had also appeared as a conductor for the Beresford film Mao's Last Dancer (2008) performing The Rite of Spring by Stravinsky. He collaborated with Justine Clarke to create Mimi's Symphony – a new orchestral story for young audiences – story by Justine Clarke and music by George Ellis. Mimi's Symphony premiered at City Recital Hall, Sydney in 2019 and had a repeat performance at the Melbourne Recital Centre in 2020. Ellis had conducted for The Justine Clarke Show for ABC TV (2017). In late 2024 and early 2025, he composed the orchestral score to The Travellers, by Academy-awarded director Bruce Beresford and starring Bryan Brown. The Travellers was released in 2025.

== Orchestral arrangements ==
Ellis has done orchestrations for live performances and studio recordings for artists including Josh Pyke with the Sydney Symphony Orchestra, Kate Miller-Heidke, Megan Washington, Alex Lloyd, The Church, Steve Kilbey, Caroline O'Connor and for tribute concerts including the music of The Beatles, David Bowie, Queen, Fleetwood Mac, George Michael, Roy Orbison, ABBA and the Bee Gees. In 2025, he conducted a concert of Icelandic orchestral music in Shanghai, China with the City Chamber Orchestra of Hong Kong.

== Education concerts ==
Ellis was musical director of the Sydney Opera House Proms concerts (2002–2010) presenting over 1,000 performances of various themes for young audiences using the persona "The Big G". He has presented education concerts for various orchestras around Australia including the Canberra Symphony Orchestra, Orchestra Victoria and Willoughby Symphony Orchestra (Mini Maestros series). He has presented the Pops for Tots concerts every year since 2000 for the Penrith Symphony Orchestra. Ellis has created new orchestral concerts including The Conductor and The Clown, The Maestro and the Magician, Mozart vs Beethoven, Musical Opposites, A Musical Theatre Journey Through the Orchestra, Beatles Orchestrated for Kids, and Tommy and the Magical Bell. Mimi's Symphony – an orchestral story for children, written in collaboration with Justine Clarke, contains original music by Ellis (2019).

== Awards ==
Ellis received Student of the Year at the Sydney Conservatorium of Music (1987). His composition Pop Mass received First Prize in the Orchestral and Choral section of the Sydney Eisteddfod (1990). His Archibald Prize portrait, painted by Evert Ploeg, received the People's Choice Award at the Art Gallery of New South Wales (2007). In 2025, Ellis was nominated for an ARIA Award for the composition Mimi's Symphony written with Justine Clarke.

== Personal life ==
Ellis has lived in Sydney all his life except Pittsburgh, USA (1988), Boulder, Colorado (1989–1990), Canberra (1993–1994) and Melbourne (2002). He spent three months in Greece working in the music department for the Athens Olympic Games (2004). He currently lives in the inner west of Sydney. He was married to Michele Pleffer (1991–2015) who met as undergraduate students at the Sydney Conservatorium of Music. They wrote a musical together called Matters of Consequence, based on the story of "The Little Prince", which was presented at the Tom Mann Theatre, Sydney, for Ellis's graduating recital. He then had a relationship with Australian soprano Bridget Patterson (2016–2019) who performed as vocal soloist for many of his concerts including at the Sydney Opera House and Hamer Hall, Melbourne. They appeared on screen together in the Bruce Beresford film Ladies in Black (2018). He has two children with his ex-wife Michele.
