= John Harding (violinist) =

Australian violinist

John Harding Hon DMus (born 1951) is an internationally renowned Australian violinist. He has travelled the world as a soloist, teacher, concertmaster, chamber musician, conductor and recording artist.

== Early life and education ==
John Phillips Harding was born in Newcastle, New South Wales, in 1951. He began his secondary schooling was at Newcastle Boys' High School and studied violin, piano, bassoon and theory at the Newcastle Conservatorium of Music.

In 1962 he moved to Sydney, where he completed his secondary schooling at the Sydney Conservatorium of Music High School and studied violin with Robert Pikler.

== Career ==
Harding was invited in 1972 to study conducting with David Zinman in the United States whilst continuing his violin studies with Joseph Silverstein. He was assistant concertmaster of the Rochester Philharmonic (1974–1976). He was awarded the Albert Spalding Prize for the most outstanding instrumentalist at Tanglewood in 1975. He then gained a position as first violin with the New York Metropolitan Opera Orchestra and studied conducting with James Levine (1976–1978).

He was artistic director of the Australian Chamber Orchestra (1979–1982).

In 1980 he was a foundation member of the University of New South Wales Ensemble (later called the Australia Ensemble), an Australian chamber music group. Harding was replaced by Dene Olding in 1982.

In 1981 he joined the Sydney String Quartet, along with Stanley Ritchie, Alexandru Todicescu and Nathan Waks. [The initial second violinist was the Rumanian Dorel Tincu, who died just before the quartet was due to perform in the Bartok string quartet cycle for the composer's centenary in 1981 in Sydney.]

He became foundation principal teacher of violin at The Hong Kong Academy for Performing Arts after his Piano Trio was invited to Hong Kong in 1985.

He moved to Europe to become leader of the Orlando Quartet (1985–1990) with whom he performed more than 700 concerts and recorded many major chamber works including the complete Mozart String Quintets for BIS. He also recorded with Philips and Ottavo. He worked with Murray Perahia, Arnold Steinhardt, Malcolm Frager, Nobuko Imai and Norbert Brainin playing frequently in Japan, the United States, Australia and throughout Europe.

He then spent a year as leader of the London Symphony Orchestra (1990–1991).

In the Netherlands he was a faculty member of both the String and Chamber music Departments of the Royal Conservatory of The Hague (1985–1995), and concertmaster (1990–1995) of its orchestra, the Residentie Orkest under Yevgeny Svetlanov.

In 1996 Edo de Waart brought him back to Australia as co-concertmaster and associate conductor of the Sydney Symphony Orchestra (1996–2001).

Harding was the artistic director of the James Fairfax Young Artists Programme, the Peter Weiss sponsored "Music for Spring", and was in 1997 artistic director of the National Music Camp.

In 1998 Harding was appointed as conjoint professor of the Faculty of Music, University of Newcastle, and was awarded a Doctor of Music honoris causa.

He became guest co-concertmaster, Melbourne Symphony Orchestra in 2002.

In 2004 he was artistic director of the Australian National Academy of Music.

He was appointed concertmaster, West Australian Symphony Orchestra in 2005.

He was the concertmaster of the Hong Kong Philharmonic Orchestra from 2006 until 2011, when an injury to his bowing arm forced his early retirement.

In 2011 he was one of the directors of the Canberra International Festival of Music.
