= Lois Simpson (cellist) =

Australian cellist and teacher

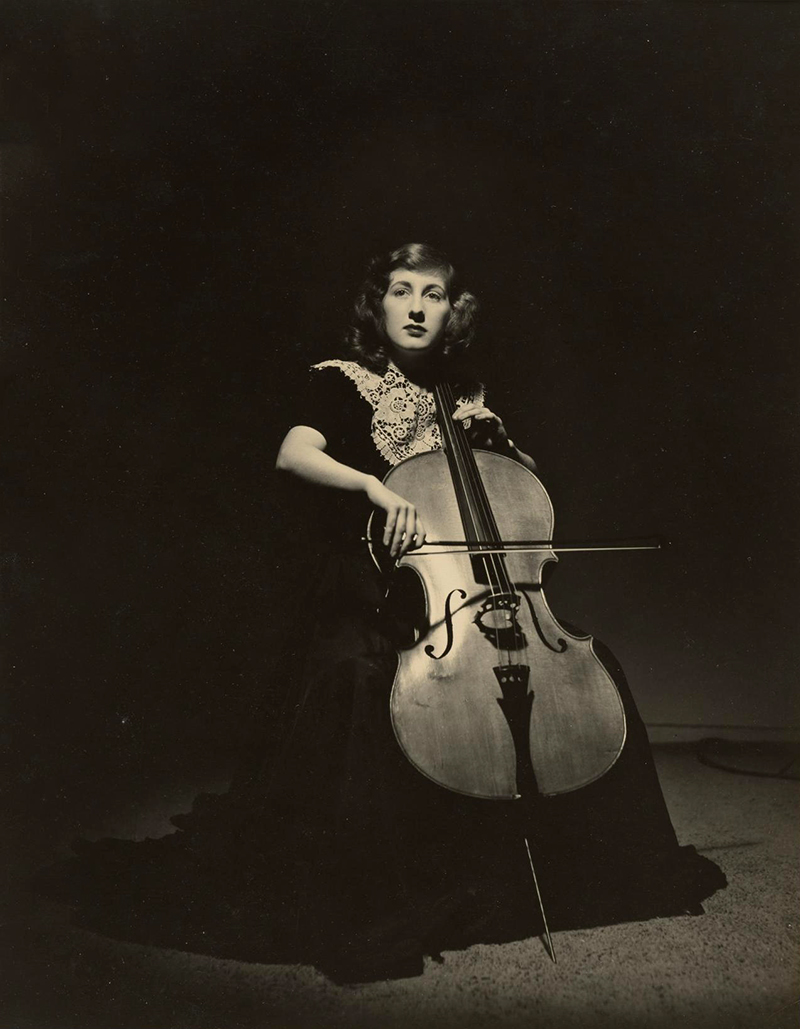
- Athol Shmith (1944) Lois Simpson
- Born: Lois Alleyne Simpson; 1927; New Zealand
- Died: 2008 (aged 80–81); Canberra, Australia
- Occupation: Cellist
- Years active: 1940–1995
- Spouse(s): Robert Pikler (1947); John Painter (1962–2008, her death)

Lois Alleyne Simpson AO (1927–2008) was an internationally renowned Australian cellist, respected teacher and chamber musician at the Sydney Conservatorium of Music and ANU School of Music.

== Career ==
In 1940, aged 13, Simpson became the youngest female musician ever in the Sydney Symphony Orchestra (SSO). At the age of 17 Simpson left the SSO to play with the Colgate-Palmolive Orchestra but rejoined the SSO in 1953 where she remained for more than 30 years, leading the cello section for much of that time.

In the late 1940s Simpson was a member of the Musica Viva Players and was a founding member of the Australian Chamber Orchestra in the 1970s. In 1985, Simpson moved to Canberra, Australia where she organised the chamber music program at the ANU School of Music for ten years.

Simpson was an enormous personality and well known in the Sydney music scene. As the Sydney Morning Herald wrote in 2008, "Simpson was birdlike, glamorous and self-deprecating but a prize fighter in the cause of music. She was not afraid to throw her tiny weight around and there are many, mostly men, who underestimated her at their peril. She knew only one way—the right way—and not just on stage. Things had to be as perfect as practice and impeccable taste could make them".

== Teaching ==
Simpson's students included well known Australian cellists Nathan Waks, Julian Thompson, Susan Blake and Timothy Nankervis.

== Personal life ==
Simpson was married successively to two prominent Australian musicians; Robert Pikler in 1947, with whom in January that year she performed publicly for the first time with Musica Viva Players at the Conservatorium in the Brahms Festival series; and then John Painter in 1962.

== Awards ==
On 9 June 2003, Simpson was made an Officer in the Order of Australia "For service to music as an internationally acclaimed cellist, teacher and chamber musician".
