= Nathan Waks =

Australian cellist and composer

Nathan Waks (born 1951) is an Australian cellist, composer, record producer, arts administrator and wine company owner.

== Early years ==
Waks was born in 1951, into a musical family, his mother being a talented pianist. He showed early musical aptitude, on the piano at age four, and the cello at age seven. He attended North Sydney Boys High School but did not graduate. While there, he showed such talent at soccer that he was offered a scholarship by the visiting Scottish football manager Tommy Docherty, but he declined as he felt that music was his passion.

He studied at the Sydney Conservatorium of Music under Lois Simpson and Robert Pikler. He won the 1968 ABC Instrumental and Vocal Competition, and then travelled to Moscow (then the Soviet Union) to study with Mstislav Rostropovich. That trip was cut short because of Cold War tensions (there were alleged to be irregularities with Waks's visa). He then went to Paris to study under Paul Tortelier, and won a Premier Prix at the Conservatoire de Paris.

== Music career ==
Having returned to Australia, in 1969, he co-founded the Fidelio Quartet with Brecon Carter and John Harding.

In 1970, at age 19, Waks was appointed Principal Cellist of the Sydney Symphony Orchestra, the youngest in the orchestra's history. He left the post after a year. He appeared as a soloist with all the Australian symphony orchestras, the BBC Symphony Orchestra and others.

In 1974, the Sydney String Quartet was re-formed for the third time, with members Harry Curby, Dorel Tincu, Alexandru Todicescu and Waks. Harry Curby left in 1980, and in 1981 after the sudden death of Dorel Tincu, the Quartet continued with John Harding, Laszlo Kiss, Todicescu and Waks. Waks remained with the Sydney String Quartet for ten years.

In 1979, he commissioned and premiered Requiem for solo cello by Peter Sculthorpe. He has also given premieres of works by Anne Boyd, Matthew Hindson and Gerald Glynn.

For the broadcaster Andrew Olle's memorial service in the Sydney Town Hall on 22 December 1995, Peter Sculthorpe wrote a special arrangement for cello and piano of his 1947 work Parting, dedicated to Olle, which was played by Nathan Waks and pianist Kathryn Selby.

In 1998, Waks was appointed Chairman of the Australia Council's Music Fund. The same year, he reduced his administrative commitments and returned to the Sydney Symphony as Co-Principal Cello.

In 2008, he participated in the Australian premiere of Gianluigi Gelmetti's Cantata della vita, with the Sydney Symphony Orchestra and various solo artists, under the composer's baton.

He has organized concerts for singers such as Frank Sinatra, Rod Stewart and Tiny Tim. He has also produced recordings for the Australian guitarist John Williams.

He is a founding Director and Artistic Adviser of the Australian Chamber Orchestra, founding Director of the Australian Music Centre; has been Director of Music at the Australian Broadcasting Corporation, Managing Director of Symphony Australia, and Board Member of the Australian National Academy of Music.

He is an Ambassador of the Melba Foundation.

== Compositions ==
Nathan Waks has written a number of film scores:

- My Brilliant Career (1979)
- Intimate Strangers (1981)
- Hunger (1986)
- For Love Alone (1986)
- Kangaroo (1986; this score was based on the slow movement of Antonín Dvořák's String Quartet No. 12 in F major "American", Op. 96)

He was musical director for The Removalists (1975).

== Winery interests ==
In 2000 he became involved in the Kilikanoon Winery in the Clare Valley of South Australia. Since 2007 he has headed a syndicate that owns Kilikanoon, and also Seppeltsfield in the Barossa Valley. Waks travels widely as an international ambassador for the companies.

== Family ==
In the 1970s, Waks' partner was the operatic soprano Eilene Hannan. He later married Candice Williams, daughter of film distribution pioneer David Williams AM (1925-2009) and sister of Kim Williams. They have two children.

== Discography ==
=== Albums ===
List of albums, with selected details
Title	Details
Cello Sonatas (with Phillip Green & Geoffrey Parsons)	Released: 1983; Format: LP; Label: ABC Transcription Service (AA9090)
For Love Alone (Original Motion Picture Soundtrack)	Released: 1986; Format: LP; Label: WEA (254138-1)

== Awards and nominations ==
=== AACTA Awards ===
- 1986 - AACTA Award for Best Original Music Score For Love Alone (nom)

=== ARIA Music Awards ===
The ARIA Music Awards is an annual awards ceremony that recognises excellence, innovation, and achievement across all genres of Australian music. They commenced in 1987.

Year	Nominee / work	Award	Result	Ref.
1987	For Love Alone	Best Original Soundtrack, Cast or Show Album	Nominated	
