= Daniel Rojas =

Daniel Rojas may refer to:

- Daniel Rojas (Australian composer) (born 1974), Chilean-born Australian pianist and composer
- Daniel Rojas (Costa Rican composer) (born 1988), Costa Rican musician and composer
- Daniel Rojas Medellín (born 1987), Colombian economist and politician, Minister of National Education (2024–)
- Daniel Rojas Pachas (born 1983), Chilean novelist, poet and academic
