= Orlando Quartet =

The Orlando Quartet was a classical music string quartet based in Amsterdam, formed in 1976 and active until 1997.

== Members ==
First violin:

- Istvan Parkanyi, of Hungary, (born in Leipzig, Germany), (1976–1984)
- John Harding, born in Australia, (1985–1990)
- Arvid Engegård, of Norway, (1991–1997)

Second violin:

- Heinz Oberdorfer, of Germany

Viola:

- Ferdinand Erblich, of Austria

Cello:

- Stefan Metz, of Romania

== Successor ==
In 1998, Istvan Parkanyi, Heinz Oberdorfer, Ferdinand Erblich and cellist Michael Müller formed the Parkanyi Quartet.

== Discography ==
The Orlando Quartet released albums of works by Mozart, Haydn, Schubert, Debussy, Dvořák, Mendelssohn Bartholdy and Ravel.
