= String Quartet (Ravel) =

1903 composition by Maurice Ravel

- by Maurice Ravel
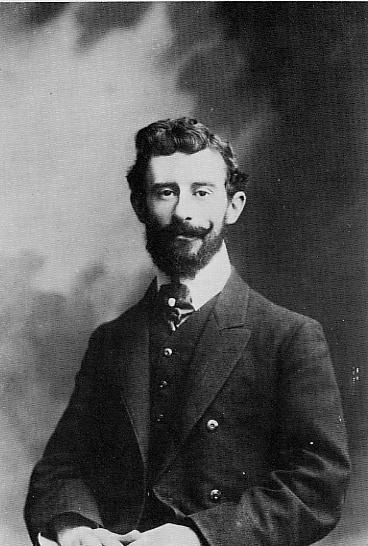
- Maurice Ravel in 1907
- Key: F major
- Composed: 1903
- Dedication: Gabriel Fauré
- Performed: 5 March 1904
- Movements: four

Maurice Ravel completed his String Quartet in F major in early April 1903 at the age of 28. It was premiered in Paris in March the following year. The work follows a four-movement classical structure: the opening movement, in sonata form, presents two themes that occur again later in the work; a playful scherzo second movement is followed by a lyrical slow movement. The finale reintroduces themes from the earlier movements and ends the work vigorously.

The quartet's structure is modelled on that of Claude Debussy's String Quartet, written in 1893, although Ravel's musical ideas strongly contrast with Debussy's. Debussy admired Ravel's piece rather more than did its dedicatee, Ravel's teacher Gabriel Fauré.

== Background ==
Ravel attended the Paris Conservatoire, but his unconventional ideas had incurred the displeasure of its ultra-conservative director Théodore Dubois and some other faculty members. His friend and teacher Gabriel Fauré continued to encourage and advise him, and Ravel made continual efforts to win the country's top musical award, the Prix de Rome, in the face of resistance from the Conservatoire regime. By 1904, it was becoming clear to the musical public that Ravel was the outstanding French composer of his generation. Among his works by that date were the piano pieces Pavane pour une infante défunte and Jeux d'eau, and 1904 saw the premieres of his orchestral song cycle Shéhérazade and the String Quartet.

The quartet has superficial resemblances to Debussy's String Quartet, written ten years earlier. Debussy approved of his younger colleague's work, and sent him an encouraging letter. The structure of Ravel's quartet is modelled on Debussy's, but where Debussy's music is, in Arbie Orenstein's words, "effusive, uninhibited, and open[ing] up fresh paths", Ravel's displays emotional reticence, innovation within traditional forms, and unrivalled technical mastery. Ravel followed a direction he described as "opposite to that of Debussy's symbolism", abandoning "the vagueness and formlessness of the early French impressionists in favour of a return to classic standards."

The quartet was premiered by the Heymann Quartet at a concert of the Société nationale de musique on 5 March 1904. Its dedicatee, Fauré, attended the performance but was not greatly taken with the piece. Critics were divided on its merits. Pierre Lalo, already a staunch opponent of Ravel, dismissed it as derivative ("it offers an incredible resemblance to the music of M. Debussy") but Jean Marnold of the Mercure de France praised the work and described Ravel as "one of the masters of tomorrow". The work had its London premiere in 1908 (the reviewer in The Musical Times found the music "chiefly remarkable for vagueness of significance, incoherence, and weird harmonic eccentricities") and its German premiere in Berlin in 1910. By 1914, the work was so well established that a London critic was able to compare performances by the Parisian String Quartet with those of British players in consecutive months. The quartet has remained, in Orenstein's phrase, "a standard work in the chamber music repertory".

== Structure ==
The quartet is in four movements.

=== I. Allegro moderato – très doux ===
Motif from the first movement

The movement is in traditional sonata form, based on two contrasting themes. The first, rising and falling through a long arc, is played by all four players at the opening and taken over by the first violin, accompanied by scalar harmonies in the lower instruments. The second theme, more reflective in character, is played by the first violin and viola playing two octaves apart. The development section, straightforward and traditional, is predominantly lyrical, gaining intensity before the recapitulation. In the recapitulation, the return of the second theme is subtly changed, with the upper three parts remaining identical to the exposition, but the cello raised a minor third, moving the passage from D minor to F major. The pace slows and the movement ends very quietly.

=== II. Assez vif – très rythmé ===
II. Assez vif – très rythmé
Second movement, played by the Army Strings ensemble of the United States Army Band

As in Debussy's quartet, the scherzo is the second movement and opens with a pizzicato passage. This first theme is in the Aeolian mode, which some writers, including the Ravel scholar Arbie Orenstein, detect the influence of the Javanese gamelan, which had greatly impressed both Debussy and Ravel when heard in Paris in 1889. Others hear in it echoes of Ravel's Spanish descent.

The central section of the music is a slow, wistful theme led by the viola. Ravel uses cross rhythms, with figures in triple time played at the same time as figures in double time. The key varies from A minor to E minor and G sharp minor. The movement concludes with a shortened reprise of the opening section.

=== III. Très lent ===
Despite the marking "very slow", the third movement has numerous changes of tempo. The viola introduces the first theme, which the first violin then repeats. There are strong thematic links with the first movement, and, in defiance of orthodox rules of harmony, conspicuous use of consecutive fifths. The music is rhapsodic and lyrical; it begins and ends in G♭ major with passages in A minor and D minor.

=== IV. Vif et agité ===
The finale reverts to the F major of the first movement. It is loosely in the form of a rondo. The opening bars are stormy, and the movement, though short, has several changes of time signature, 5/8 to 5/4 to 3/4. Short melodic themes are given rapid tremolandi and sustained phrases are played against emphatic arpeggios. There are brief moments of calm sections, including a reference to the first subject of the opening movement. The turbulence of the opening bars of the finale reasserts itself, and the work ends vigorously.

== Duration ==
The work generally takes about half an hour to play. Some typical timings on record are given in the following table.

Quartet	I	II	III	IV	Total	Ref
Talich	7:51	6:24	8:13	4:34	27:02	
Amati	7:57	6:45	8:10	5:00	27:52	
Belcea	7:49	6:02	8:35	5:27	27:53	
Melos	8:11	6:21	9:07	4:46	28:25	
Alban Berg	7:40	6:51	9:20	4:54	28:45	
Chilingirian	8:36	6:21	8:39	5:28	29:04	
Ébène	8:50	6:29	9:47	4:40	29:46	
Juilliard	8:57	6:31	9:19	5:27	30:14	
Brodsky	8:41	6:27	9:40	5:34	30:22	

== Arrangements ==
During Ravel's lifetime, Ginette Martenot transcribed the first movement of the quartet for ondes Martenot, gaining the composer's approval. There are arrangements for solo piano and two pianos (both arranged by Lucien Garban) and for piano four hands (arranged by Maurice Delage). The conductor Rudolf Barshai arranged the quartet for small string orchestra in 2003. The Australian Nexas Quartet arranged the work for four saxophones.
