= Jessica Cottis =

Australian-British conductor

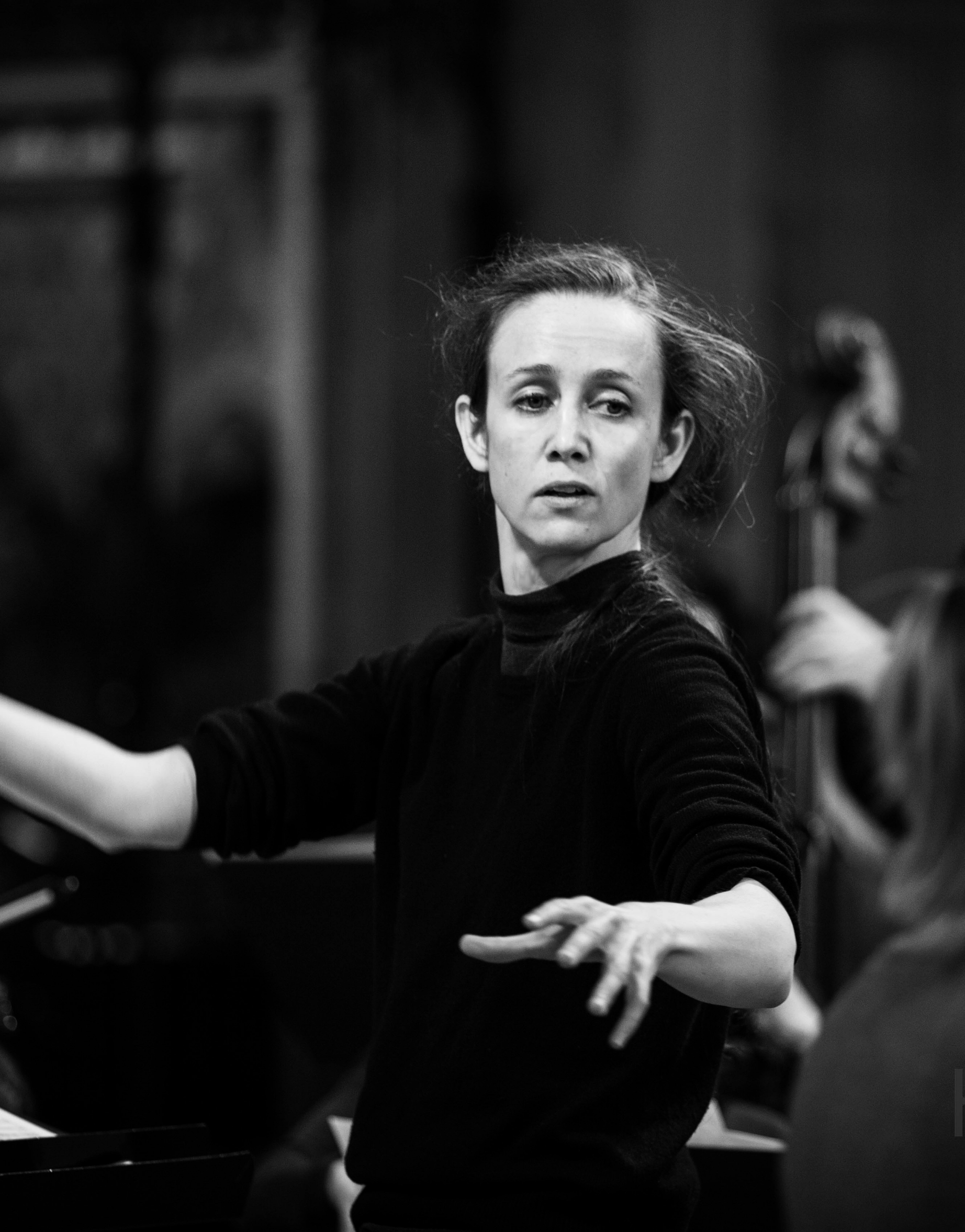
- Photo taken in rehearsals for concert at St John's Smith Square, London. December 2016
- Born: 13 December 1979 (age 46); Sale, Victoria, Australia
- Education: Australian National University; Royal Academy of Music
- Occupation: Conductor
- Years active: 2009–present
- Title: Artistic director and chief conductor of the Canberra Symphony Orchestra
- Term: 2021–present
- Website: jessicacottis.com

Jessica Cottis (born 13 December 1979) is an Australian-British conductor. Since 2021 she has been artistic director and chief conductor of the Canberra Symphony Orchestra.

== Early life ==
Cottis was born at RAAF Base East Sale in Victoria, Australia, the daughter of an Australian Defence Attaché and Royal Australian Air Force officer. The family lived around the world, including the United States, England, and New Zealand. The fifth of five siblings, her older sister is immigration expert Sophie Montgomery; her eldest brother is writer and musician JG Montgomery.

== Education ==
As a youth, Cottis played trumpet, French horn and piano. She studied organ, piano and musicology at the Australian National University, and graduated with first-class honours. With support from the Royal Philharmonic Society and Australian Music Foundation, she continued her studies as an organist in Paris with Marie-Claire Alain. She was a prize winner in the 2000 Australian Young Performers' Competition and made her European debut as an organist at London's Westminster Cathedral the next year.

A wrist injury halted her playing career. Cottis read law at the University of London and in 2006 began conducting studies at the Royal Academy of Music where her teachers included Colin Metters and Sir Colin Davis. She also spent time at the Accademia Musicale Chigiana in Siena. She graduated from the Royal Academy of Music in 2009, with distinction, and was appointed RAM Manson Fellow in Composition. She was made an Associate of the Royal Academy of Music in 2015.

== Career ==
Upon graduation from the Royal Academy of Music, in September 2009, she became the first postgraduate conducting fellow of the Royal Conservatoire of Scotland and was appointed assistant conductor with the BBC Scottish Symphony Orchestra, where her mentors included Donald Runnicles. She served 2 years in the post. In 2012, after an extensive search process, the Sydney Symphony Orchestra appointed Cottis its assistant conductor, and she held this post for 2 years. She worked closely with the orchestra's then-chief conductor, Vladimir Ashkenazy, and conducted the orchestra in over 30 concerts a year.

In 2014, Cottis was appointed principal conductor of the Glasgow New Music Expedition, where she curated notable projects alongside visual artists and filmmakers. During her time at the Royal Academy of Music, Cottis founded a new opera company, Bloomsbury Opera. Cottis has also commissioned new operas, including Anna Meredith's Tarantula in Petrol Blue and The Mirror by Martin Georgiev, and has conducted the premieres of new operas including Na'ama Zisser's Mamzer Bastard for the Royal Opera House.

In 2014, Cottis became a visiting professor in conducting at the Royal Conservatoire of Scotland. She is a regular contributor to BBC radio and television programmes. She has also served as chair of the Tait Memorial Trust Music Board. Cottis conducted her first commercial recording, Gallipoli Symphony, in 2015, a tri-nation project of cultural diplomacy between Australia, New Zealand and Turkey, for ABC Classics.

In 2021, Cottis became artistic director and chief conductor of the Canberra Symphony Orchestra, the first female conductor to hold the posts.

== Personal life ==
Cottis has a form of synaesthesia, in which she experiences sound as colours. She resides in north London.

She married Swedish opera singer Elsa Ridderstedt in August 2023.

Cultural offices
Preceded by Nicholas Milton	Chief conductor, Canberra Symphony Orchestra; 2021–present	Succeeded by incumbent
