= Conservatorium High School =

School in Sydney, Australia

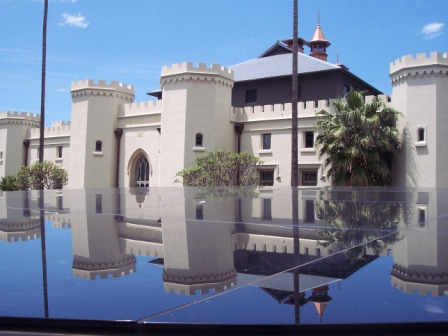
- Front western view of the Sydney Conservatorium of Music

Location
- Royal Botanic Gardens, off Macquarie Street, Sydney central business district, New South Wales; Australia; 33°51′48″S 151°12′51″E

Information
- Type: Government-funded co-educational selective and specialist secondary day school
- Motto: Latin: Fiat Lux (Let there be light)
- Established: 1915; 111 years ago
- Founder: Henri Verbrugghen
- School district: Port Jackson
- Educational authority: New South Wales Department of Education
- Specialist: Music
- Principal: Ian Barker
- Years: 7–12
- Enrolment: c. 150–200 (2015)
- Nickname: ConHigh
- Website: conservat-h.schools.nsw.gov.au

The Conservatorium High School (colloquially known as Con High) is a public government-funded, co-educational, selective, secondary day school that specialises in music education. It lies on the western edge of the Royal Botanic Gardens, off Macquarie Street, in Sydney's CBD.

The School is the secondary arm of the tertiary Sydney Conservatorium of Music, and is the only specialist music high school in New South Wales.

== Overview ==
The School accepts students from Year 7 to Year 12, providing opportunities for musically gifted young people to combine music and academic studies. The school ranks highly in the state for academic achievement; in 2014 it was placed 9th, in 2016 10th, and in 2019 2nd in the state for Higher School Certificate results.

The school counts among its alumni some of Australia's most acclaimed performers, teachers, composers, and musicians.

== History ==
The school was established at the behest of Henri Verbrugghen, foundation director of the NSW State Conservatorium of Music, and enrolled its first students in 1918. The inaugural principal, Peter Steele, was seconded from Sydney Boys High School and taught in both the secondary and tertiary programs of the Conservatorium.

== Campus ==
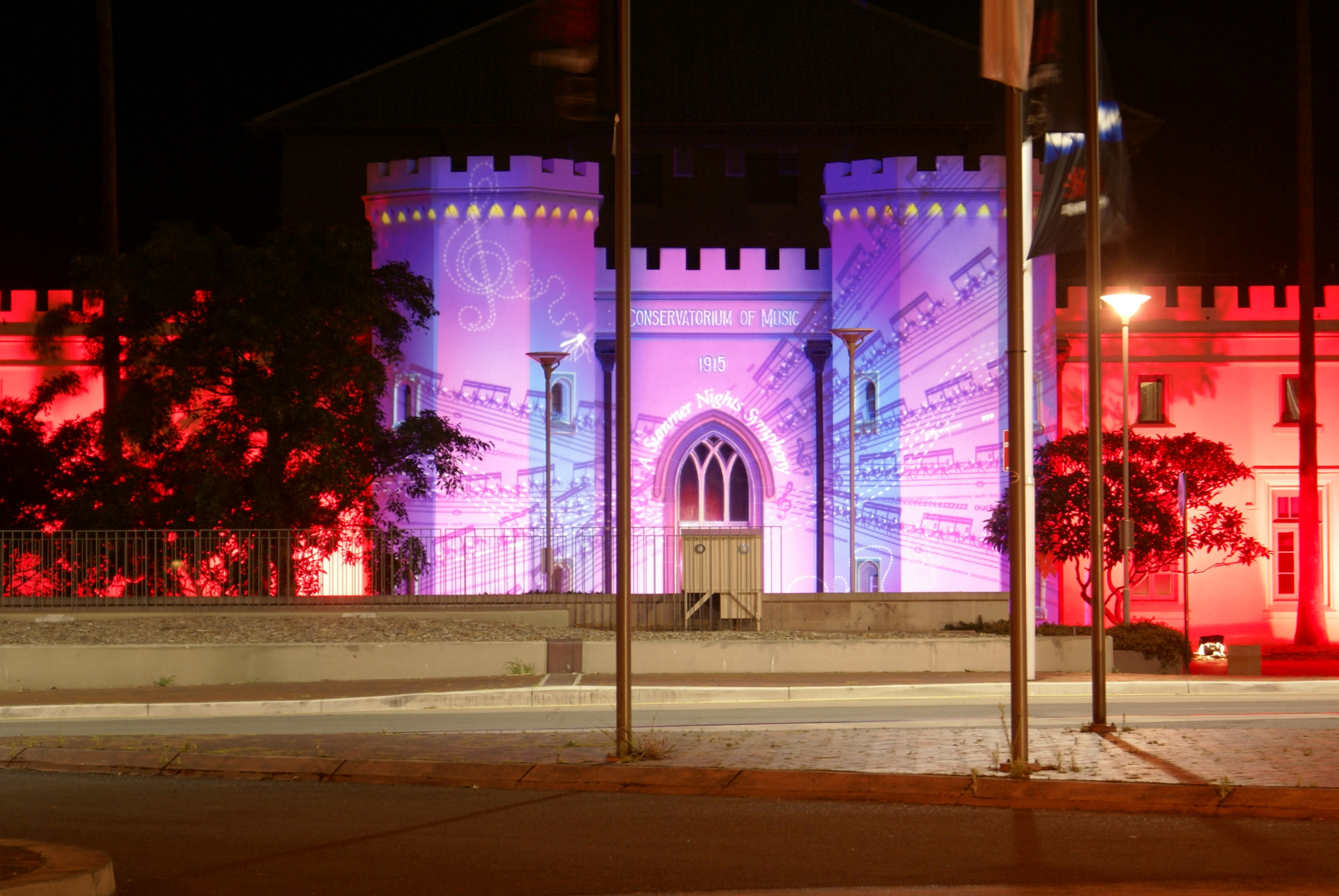
Conservatorium of Music during Macquarie Night Lights, 2006

Adjoining the Botanic Gardens and overlooking Farm Cove, the Conservatorium of Music is one of Sydney's best-known heritage sites. The heart of the Conservatorium is the turreted sandstone structure that was designed by the convict architect Francis Greenway to serve as vice-regal stables for Government House, which is across the gardens to the north. Extensive redevelopment in the late 1990s transformed the Con into a teaching, research, and music performance complex with expanded accommodation for around 160 Conservatorium High School students.

=== Facilities ===
In addition to standard school classrooms, school offices, and staff room, the School has access to 53 teaching studios, 63 practice rooms, 140 pianos, 15 seminar and ensemble rooms, choral and instrumental rehearsal rooms, three recital/lecture halls, and two major concert halls.

Specialist facilities of the school include:

- Joseph Post Auditorium with recording facilities
- Music computer laboratory
- Keyboard laboratory
- Recording studio and electronic music production suite
- General computer laboratory
- Science laboratory
- Visual arts and design and technology studio
- Student Independent Learning Centre

The school has access to other Conservatorium of Music venues such as:

- Recital halls
- Practice and ensemble rooms
- The Music Workshop
- Verbrugghen Hall

=== Library ===
Students have access to the Conservatorium Library, one of Australia's finest academic music libraries, run by the University of Sydney. The Conservatorium Library functions as both a secondary school library and a university research library. Its collection dates from the establishment of the NSW State Conservatorium of Music. The Library holds some 100,000 scores, 32,000 books, 20,000 CDs/DVDs, 12,000 vinyl recordings, print and electronic journals, and databases of streamed recordings and digitised scores. In addition to music, the collection covers school subjects such as creative arts, English, human society and its environment, languages, mathematics, science, and technology.

== School life and admissions ==
The School is staffed and administered by the New South Wales Department of Education. Instrumental tuition, chamber music programs, and individual composition lessons are provided by Sydney University staff and other highly qualified and highly regarded musicians, composers, conductors, and musicologists. Students regularly participate in Conservatorium concerts and masterclasses.

Admission is through a competitive process of auditions and workshops that assess each applicant's potential and level of achievement. Auditions are held each year around August. Prospective students must also sit the NSW Selective High School Placement Test or other psychometric assessment.

The Conservatorium High School Parents and Citizens Association encourages parental representation on curriculum, finance, welfare and school management committees, and in a variety of fundraising activities.

== Curriculum ==
Subjects offered for students in Years 7–10 include: music, science, English, history, mathematics, geography, Mandarin, visual arts, design and technology, drama, personal development and health, performance workshop program, physical education, sports.

Subjects offered to students in Years 11–12 may include: music 2, music extension, music performance board-endorsed course (performance workshop program, ensembles, chamber music and choir, house concerts), ancient history, modern history, history extension, biology, chemistry, physics, English advanced, English extension 1, English extension 2, French, German, mathematics general, mathematics, mathematics extension 1, mathematics extension 2, visual arts, and Mandarin.

== Music program and concerts ==
Conservatorium High School students take part in a full program of individual, small ensemble, orchestral and choral music training and performance, as well as tuition in composition, music history, and music theory.

Students receive tuition on their chosen instruments, mostly from teachers from the Sydney Conservatorium, a faculty of the University of Sydney. The standard semester requirement for all students is 16 one-to-one weekly lessons of one hour's duration on their major instrument, and 16 one-to-one weekly lessons of half-an-hour's duration on their minor instrument.

Students in Years 8–12 take part in either Junior or Senior Small Ensembles each week. Students in years 11 and 12 participate performance workshop classes for one hour per week. Included are classes on all aspects of performance, including such related topics as meditation, remedial posture work, and performance anxiety.

Every year the school holds a regular program of public concerts, often attracting world-renowned musicians to perform with the students. The school presents three major choral/orchestral concerts each year. Term 2 showcases the annual concert and term 3 is the valedictory concert and farewell to Year 12. The winner of the School's annual concerto competition also performs with the orchestra on this occasion. At annual house concerts, held at the very end of Term 4, the houses compete for a trophy in one of the school's most esteemed musical events. Students are responsible for sourcing the music and obtaining permission to perform it. The criteria against which the performances are judged by professional guest adjudicators.

The School appointed Carolyn Watson as conductor-in-residence in 2011. Recent repertoire performed under Watson includes Mussorgsky/Ravel Pictures at an Exhibition in a performance involving every student at the school, the first all-Australian program featuring works by composers Vine, Sculthorpe, Stanhope, Hindson and John Peterson; and Mozart's Requiem performed to capacity audiences. In addition to orchestral concerts, there are chamber music concerts, soloist concerts, large- and small-ensemble concerts, and assembly performances.

== Fees and scholarships ==
The Conservatorium High School is a public school and academic tuition fees are set by the government. The cost of compulsory individual music program tuition with teachers of the Sydney Conservatorium of Music is subsidised for students enrolling at the Conservatorium High School. Scholarships are available for special programs and purposes.

== Notable alumni ==
The school's alumni association, the Conservatorium High Association of Old Students, aims to keep alumni connected through events and a regular newsletter, "This week at Con High". The Association also puts on concerts that raise funds for student grants and scholarships.

Notable alumni of the Conservatorium High School include:

- Jack Colwell – singer-songwriter
- Iva Davies – songwriter, composer, lead singer of Icehouse
- Sam Fischer – pop-rock singer-songwriter
- John Foreman – musician and television personality
- Martin Lass – classical crossover violinist and recording artist
- Jade MacRae – soul singer and recording artist
- Kim Moyes – producer, DJ & half of The Presets
- Jane Rutter – flautist and recording artist
- Toby Thatcher – oboist and assistant conductor of the Sydney Symphony Orchestra (SSO)
- Richard Tognetti – violinist, composer, and conductor, artistic director and leader of the Australian Chamber Orchestra (ACO)
- Barry Tuckwell – Grammy-nominated horn player and conductor
- Roger Woodward – classical concert pianist

== See also ==
- List of government schools in New South Wales
- List of creative and performing arts high schools in New South Wales
- List of selective high schools in New South Wales
