= Nexas Quartet =

Australian classical saxophone quartet

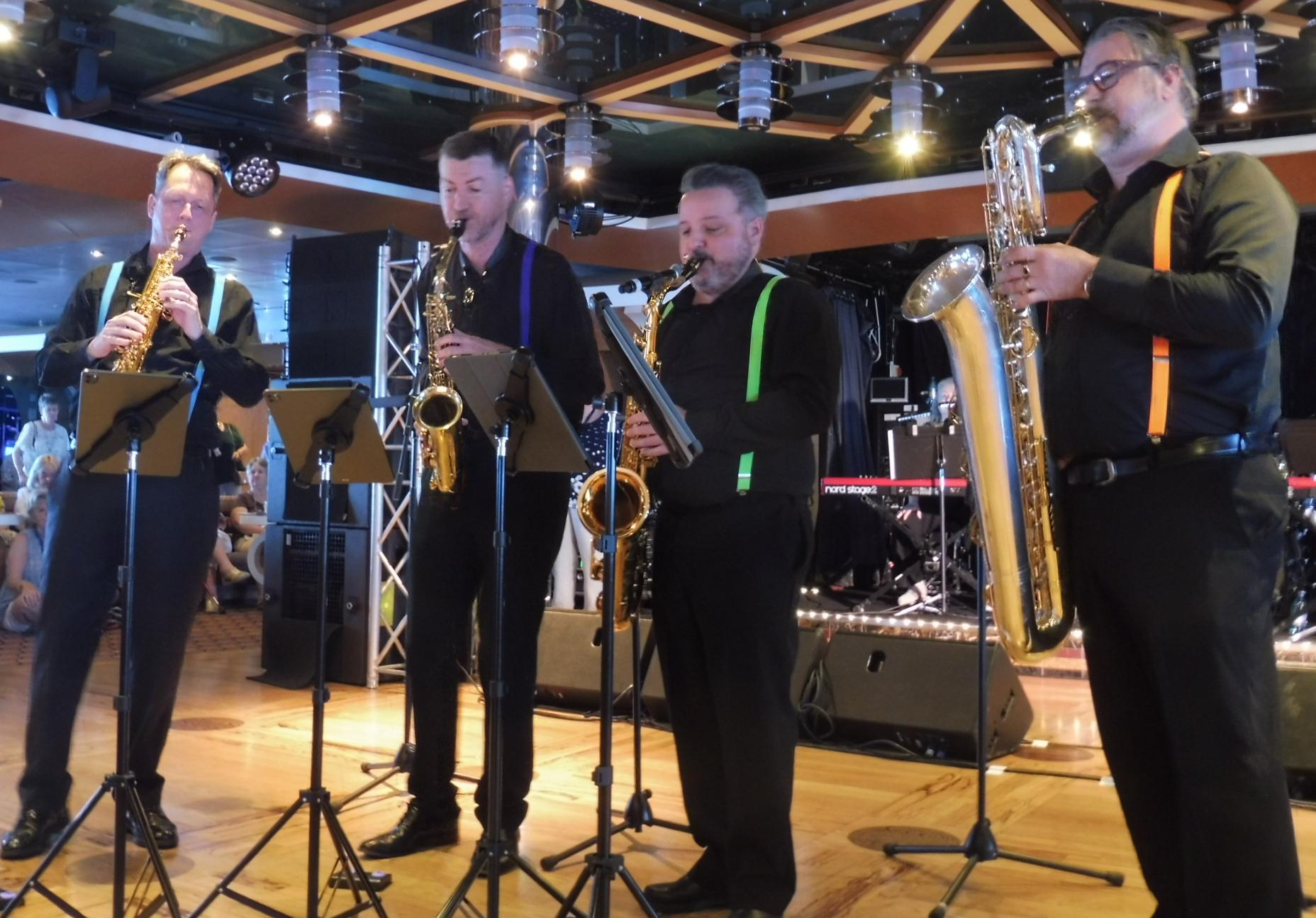
Nexas Quartet, 2024

The Nexas Quartet is a Sydney-based Australian saxophone chamber ensemble. They create and perform arrangements of chamber works, and they have new music commissioned for them. Founded in 2002, its members are Michael Duke (soprano), Andrew Smith (alto), Nathan Henshaw (tenor), Jay Byrnes (baritone).

The group performed at the Australian Festival of Chamber Music, the Adelaide Cabaret Festival, and the World Saxophone Congress in Scotland (2012), France (2015) and Croatia (2018) and many other venues in Australia and overseas.

== Repertoire ==
Notable composers in their repertoire include Astor Piazzolla (Argentine tango, nuevo tango), Claude Debussy (Children's Corner, Danse sacré, Danse profane), Maurice Ravel (Ma mère l'Oye, String Quartet), Dvořák's String Quartet No. 12 (American Quartet), Samuel Barber (String Quartet), Chick Corea (Children's Songs), Tomasz Śpiewak, Kurt Weill, and Carl Vine.

The quartet had new works written for them by Australian composers, including Carl Vine, Matthew Hindson, Lachlan Skipworth; Elena Kats-Chernin arranged her transcription from Notebook for Anna Magdalena Bach for the quartet.

== Recordings ==
Their debut album Current (2016) demonstrates their collaboration with leading Australian composers. They followed with the albums Ballads of the Pleasant Life – Kurt Weill, Weimar and Exile (2017 ABC Classics) with Peter Coleman-Wright, and Tango de Saxos (Da Vinci, 2021) with bandoneonist Stephen Cuttriss and pianist Daniel Rojas.
