= Anthony Maydwell =

Anthony Maydwell (born 1956, Sydney) is an Australian harpist, educator, musicologist and director of the Summa Musica Chamber Choir and Ensemble.

== Early years ==
Maydwell began piano studies at the age of 5, and the harp five years later, studying under June Loney. He was a corner boy medallist in St Andrew’s Cathedral choir, Sydney, before moving to the New South Wales State Conservatorium of Music. He was Student of the Year at the Conservatorium on graduation in 1975.

At 16, Maydwell began playing regularly with the Sydney Symphony Orchestra and he made his first recordings and his concerto début for Musica Viva Australia the next year.

In 1974, he was among Australia's first broadcasters in stereo FM radio, acting as compere on classical radio station 2MBS-FM on its first day of official broadcasting.

In 1977, the Sydney Morning Herald described Maydwell as "a distinguished Australian musician". During his studies, he began experimenting with conducting Restoration masques and late Renaissance Italian madrigal.

He was appointed to the Executive of the Australian Musicological Society in 1980.

Maydwell was a member of AZ Music and The Seymour Group. He also regularly appeared with Opera Australia and the Australian Ballet orchestras. He went on to the position of harpist with the West Australian Symphony Orchestra. He specialised in Trecento Madrigal, and later in 18th century performance practice, for his master's degree at the University of Western Australia.

== Professional career ==
Maydwell was a foundation staff member of the Western Australian Conservatorium of Music in 1986 and taught there for the next 22 years.

Maydwell formed the Summa Musica Chamber Choir and Ensemble in 1995 and is its current director.

In 2008, Maydwell left the Conservatorium to focus on early Bolivian music research.

He has toured with the Hallé Orchestra and the Budapest Symphony and conducted first Australian performances from Haydn to Pårt. His Summa Musica Chamber Choir has won acclaim performing early and contemporary music, including annual performances, for Holy Week, of music not performed for centuries.

== Recordings ==
Maydwell's first commercial recording, made when aged 17, was Eugene Goosens’ Trio, for the ABC/World Record Club. He played harp on the 2006 Naxos/Opus Arte DVD (OAF 4014D) of Britten’s Turn of the Screw.

He was principal harpist of the Singapore Symphony Orchestra from early 2000 to 2003, performing in both Singapore and China, and played harp on a recording by the orchestra, on the BIS label, of the works of Richard Yardumian.

== Later works ==
Maydwell's link with his choral past has been maintained through interest in the high renaissance liturgical repertoire. He has reconstructed, published and performed numerous autographs and early prints of works by Gesualdo, Lassus, Monteverdi, Gallus, Victoria, Morales, etc., and many works found in Renaissance anthologies. He is considered by Marcela Inch Calvimonte, former Director of the Archivo y Biblioteca Nacionales de Bolivia, an expert in the Baroque music of Bolivia. He has completed an extensive edition of Michael Praetorius’ 1607 work, Musarum Sioniarum.

Maydwell teaches in all areas of classical musicianship, conducts the Summa Musica, has established a children’s choir in the hills of Perth, Western Australia and performs with all of Perth’s orchestras.

From 2013 to 2014, Maydwell was a member of the Artistic Review Panel of Musica Viva Australia.

== Personal life ==
Maydwell is married to Faith Maydwell, professional pianist, author of pedagogical works on music and artistic director of the Magellan Trio.

== Bibliography ==
- Maydwell, Anthony (1982). A translation and comparative study of two methods for harp by Philippe-Jacques Meyer from 1763 and 1773.
