= Macquarie Trio =

Australian chamber music ensemble (1993–2006)

- Origin: Sydney
- Years active: 1993–2006
- Past members: Charmian Gadd (violin); Kathryn Selby (piano); Michael Goldschlager (cello); Michael Dauth (violin); Nicholas Milton (violin)

Macquarie Trio was an Australian chamber music ensemble. They received nominations for the 1996 and 2001 ARIA Awards for Best Classical Album with their album Beethoven Piano Trios and Schubert: Complete Piano Trios. The piano trio has commissioned works by Nigel Westlake and Elena Kats-Chernin. The Trio disbanded in 2006 after the Macquarie University withdrew their funding.

== Discography ==
=== Albums ===
List of albums, with selected details
| Title | Details |
|---|---|
| Beethoven Piano Trios | Released: 1996; Format: CD; Label: |
| Schubert: Complete Piano Trios | Released: 2001; Format: CD; Label: ABC Classics (465 792-2) |
| Libertango: The Music of Astor Piazzolla | Released: 2003; Format: CD, Digital; Label: ABC Classics |
| Brahms: Piano Trios | Released: 2011; Format: CD, Digital; Label: ABC Classics |
| Mendelssohn: Piano Trios | Released: 2013; Format: CD, Digital; Label: ABC Classics |

== Awards and nominations ==
=== ARIA Music Awards ===
The ARIA Music Awards is an annual awards ceremony that recognises excellence, innovation, and achievement across all genres of Australian music. They commenced in 1987.

| Year | Nominee / work | Award | Result | Ref. |
|---|---|---|---|---|
| 1996 | Beethoven Piano Trios | Best Classical Album | Nominated | |
| 2001 | Schubert: Complete Piano Trios | Best Classical Album | Nominated | |
