= Kathryn Selby =

Australian classical pianist (born 1962)

Kathryn Selby AM
- Born: Kathryn Shauna Selby; 1962 (age 63–64); Sydney, New South Wales, Australia
- Other name: Kathy Selby
- Education: Sydney Conservatorium of Music; University of Washington; Curtis Institute of Music; Bryn Mawr College; Juilliard School
- Occupation: Pianist
- Years active: 1980s–present
- Employer: Macquarie University
- Musical career
- Genres: Classical; chamber
- Formerly of: Macquarie Trio; TriOz; Selby & Friends

Kathryn Shauna Selby AM (born 1962) is an Australian classical pianist. She is often known as Kathy Selby.

== Biography ==
She grew up in Sydney. She entered the Sydney Conservatorium of Music at the age of seven, studying under Nancy Salas. Following this, she studied with Béla Síki at the University of Washington in Seattle. In 1976, she was awarded a Churchill Fellowship. Two years later, in 1978, she won an American Music Scholarship, which led to her making her debut with the Philadelphia Orchestra. In 1981, she received the Australia Council's International Fellowship for Studies in the United States. She performed at the United Nations General Assembly in an Australian Government–sponsored concert in aid of UNICEF, in association with Dame Joan Sutherland and Richard Bonynge. She studied at the Curtis Institute of Music, under Mieczysław Horszowski, and won the prestigious Rachmaninoff Prize and the institute's Gold Medal. In 1983, she graduated from Bryn Mawr College, where she studied with Claude Frank. She did her master's degree in music at the Juilliard School under the tutlage of Rudolf Firkušný, and she won the Juilliard Mozart Competition.

Selby has won prizes at the Van Cliburn Competition, the William Kapell Competition, the Bruce Hungerford Memorial award and the Young Concert Artists Competition in New York, with a debut at Carnegie Hall. She spent the summer of 1982 at the Marlboro Music Festival, at the invitation of Rudolf Serkin.

She returned to Australia in 1988 on her appointment as the first Musician-in-Residence at Macquarie University. She held this position until 2003. She was a founding member of the Macquarie Trio, and from 1993 to 2006, was also its manager. The trio came to an abrupt end after its university funding was cut, which in turn followed disagreements between the members. She later founded TriOz, and she now presents subscription seasons of chamber music under the banner of "Selby & Friends".

For Andrew Olle's memorial service in the Sydney Town Hall on 22 December 1995, Peter Sculthorpe wrote a special arrangement for cello and piano of his 1947 work Parting, which was played by Nathan Waks and Selby.

Selby has performed with many orchestras in the United States, Australia and other countries. These include the Philadelphia Orchestra (she was a founding member of its Chamber Group), Boston Pops Orchestra, Cincinnati Symphony Orchestra, Indianapolis Symphony Orchestra, Pittsburgh Symphony Orchestra, St. Louis Symphony Orchestra, San Francisco Symphony, Australian Chamber Orchestra, Sydney Symphony Orchestra, Melbourne Symphony Orchestra, The Queensland Orchestra, Canberra Symphony Orchestra, and the West Australian Symphony Orchestra. She has performed at the Athens, Spoleto, Caramoor, Aspen, Marlboro, Sydney Mozart and Sydney Festivals. She has made many recordings.

In the 2013 Australia Day Honours, Selby was appointed a Member of the Order of Australia (AM).
