= Daniel Rojas (Australian musician) =

Chilean-born Australian pianist and composer (born 1974)

- Born: June 23, 1974 (age 51)
- Instrument: Piano

Daniel Rojas (born 23 June 1974) is a Chilean-born Australian pianist and composer. Rojas' work as a composer and improviser draws upon indigenous, folk, popular and classical Latin American traditions.

== Early life and education ==
Rojas received a Bachelor of Music – Composition with Honours (First Class and Medal) and a Master of Music in Composition from the University of Sydney. He later graduated with a PhD from the Sydney Conservatorium of Music.

== Career ==
Since 2012, Rojas worked as a solo pianist, performing music by Latin American composers, including Astor Piazzolla and Alberto Ginastera, his own works, arrangements of traditional folksongs and free improvisation. He performed his own Piano Concerto No. 1 with the Sydney University Symphony Orchestra under George Ellis, has performed solo recitals in Sydney and Townsville and performs with Latin jazz, tango and world music groups such as Latin Kaos; Sonora Galaxia; Orquesta Los Mambizes; Tango Paradiso; Chai Ensemble, Jacana, Drumbeats and Tigramuna.

In 2012 Rojas released a solo album, Latin Piano Expressions, featuring his own works, Piazzolla's Resureccion de Angel and Histoire du Tango as well as four free improvisations. The album was praised in the AU Review, and was selected as 'Editor's Choice' in Limelight Magazine in October 2013.

In 2015 Rojas performed with the North Sydney Orchestra. He also joined the contemporary jazz group Alturas, was a member of the Mendoza Quartet and is the pianist, arranger and composer for Orquesta La Luna, a Sydney-based traditional and contemporary tango ensemble.

== Compositions ==
Rojas' works draw upon a variety of Latin American influences. One of his most widely performed works, Danza de Montañas for solo piano (2003), features the influence of Afro-Cuban dance rhythms as well as the music of the indigenous communities of the Peruvian Andes. These two influences are combined with nuevo tango rhythms in his Sonata for Soprano and Piano (2010) and the solo piano work, Entre Bajos y Alturas (2011). Entre Bajos y Altruas, commissioned by pianist, Zubin Kanga, features a partly prepared piano (evoking a thumb-piano in some sections and the percussion of a salsa band in others) as well as dense polyrhythms and rapid changes in metre. This fusing of traditional Latin American genres with rhythmic techniques borrowed from Stravinsky, Bartók and Messiaen are also found in his major ensemble works, Danza Amarosas (written for the Kammer Ensemble in 2007), Mirimba for solo marimba (commissioned for Claire Edwardes) and Marimba Concerto (for percussionist, Claire Edwardes and the Sydney Metropolitan Orchestra in 2013).

Rojas has composed two piano concertos. The Piano Concerto No. 1 ("The Latin Piano Concerto") is flamboyant and populist, with a tonal harmonic language and classical structure. It is also the more widely performed of the two with performances by the Queensland Orchestra, Sydney University Symphony Orchestra and Kuringai Philharmonic following the premiere with the Sydney Youth Philharmonic (and soloist, Zubin Kanga) in 2006. The Piano Concerto No. 2 ("Entre Ritos y Parrandas"), commissioned by Ars Musica Australis for the Sydney Youth Orchestra and soloist, Konstantin Shamray, is more unorthodox in structure, starting with a pentatonic folk melody and gradually changing into a savage style.

== Selected list of works ==
=== Concert works ===
- Stillness in the Heart for Solo Voice, Mouth Bow and Chamber Orchestra (1998) 15'. Commissioned by Jo van Driessche and the Pro-Musica Philharmonic Orchestra of Ghent. Released by Zoku/EMI Belgium
- Danza de Montañas for piano (2003) 8’
- Festival Afro-Andino for symphony orchestra (2003–04) 10' Commissioned by the Melbourne Symphony Orchestra
- Kyrie Eleison for SATB choir, piano and cello (2004) 3’
- Three Short Thematic Love Pieces for Clarinet and Piano (2004) 6’
- Three Short Pieces for Piano (2004) 5’
- Concerto para Piano and Orchestra: Latinoamericanismos, a.k.a. The Latin Piano Concerto (2005) 25’ Commissioned by Arts Musica Australis and the Sydney Youth Orchestra
- Soltura for Clarinet and String Quartet (2007) 5’ Commissioned by the Sydney Symphony Orchestra Fellows
- Come tu Arroz! for male chorus (2007) 8 Commissioned by Sydney Grammar School for the Grammarphones
- Agua Dura Hervida for string quintet and wind quintet. Commissioned by Ars Musica Australis for the Sydney Omega Ensemble (2008)
- Danzas Amorosas for flute, clarinet, violin, cello and piano (2007) ca. 12’ Commissioned by Ars Musica Australis for the Kammer Ensemble
- Angels Surround These Your Children for Soprano and String Quartet (2007) ca. 7’ Text composed by Anne Boyd; wedding song performed for the occasion of his brother’s wedding
- Jubilate for children’s and men’s choruses, SATB choir, soloists, organ and orchestra (2007) ca. 30’, based on the poem by Christopher Smart, "Jubilate Agno". Commissioned by Sydney Grammar School Music Association for the school’s sequicentenary celebration concert.
- Luna Sobre Miraflores and other pieces for piano (2008) 4’
- Two Peruvian Jungle Legends for Percussion Ensemble. Commissioned by Chronology Arts (2008) 30’
- Little Serenade for String Orchestra. Commissioned by the Bourbaki Ensemble (2008) 12’
- Arrorro (Lullaby) for Female Chorus (SSA) 4’
- Mirimba for Marimba. Commissioned by Claire Edwardes. Released by Tall Poppies. 3’
- Sonata for soprano and piano, text by Pablo Neruda (Spanish). Commissioned by Zubin Kanga. 12’
- Entre Ritos y Parrandas: Concerto for Piano and Orchestra No. 2. Commission by Ars Musica Australis for Konstantin Shamrai and the Sydney Youth Orchestra. Recorded by ABC FM (2009) 27’
- Entre Bajos y Alturas for prepared piano. Commissioned by Zubin Kanga (2011) 10’
- Concerto for Marimba and Chamber Orchestra. Commissioned by Claire Edwardes and the Metropolitan Orchestra (2013) 25’
- La Grán Salsa for 2 pianos (2014) 10’

=== Film scores ===
- Documentary on Charles Billich, Official Olympic Artist, Beijing Olympics (2007) 30’
- Joy (2005) 13’
- Rosa and Denada (2005) 8'. First Screening: Dendy Cinema, Circular Quay, Sydney (2005)
- Felicity’s View (Co-composed with Colin Offord) 20’. First Screening: Montreal Film Festival (1999); Subsequent Screenings: Houston International World Film Festival (2000) Bronze Award for Original Drama; *Festival of Nations, Austria (2000) Jury Prize; TV broadcasts on CBC and WTN.

== Discography ==
- Daniel Rojas, Latin Piano Expressions. 2012. DR005
- "Entre Bajos y Alturas" in Zubin Kanga, Piano Inside Out. 2015
- "Marimba" in Claire Edwardes, Marimba Miniatures. 2010. Tall Poppies, TP215
- "Nostalgia" in Nexas Quartet, Current. 2016. NQC001
- "Llevame" in Jay Byrnes, El Asunto del Tango. 2015
- "Sonata" in Jane Sheldon & Zubin Kanga, Chiaroscuro: Modern Works for Soprano and Piano. 2015. Phosphor Records — 2015 [PR0003]
