= Canberra Symphony Orchestra =

Australian professional orchestra

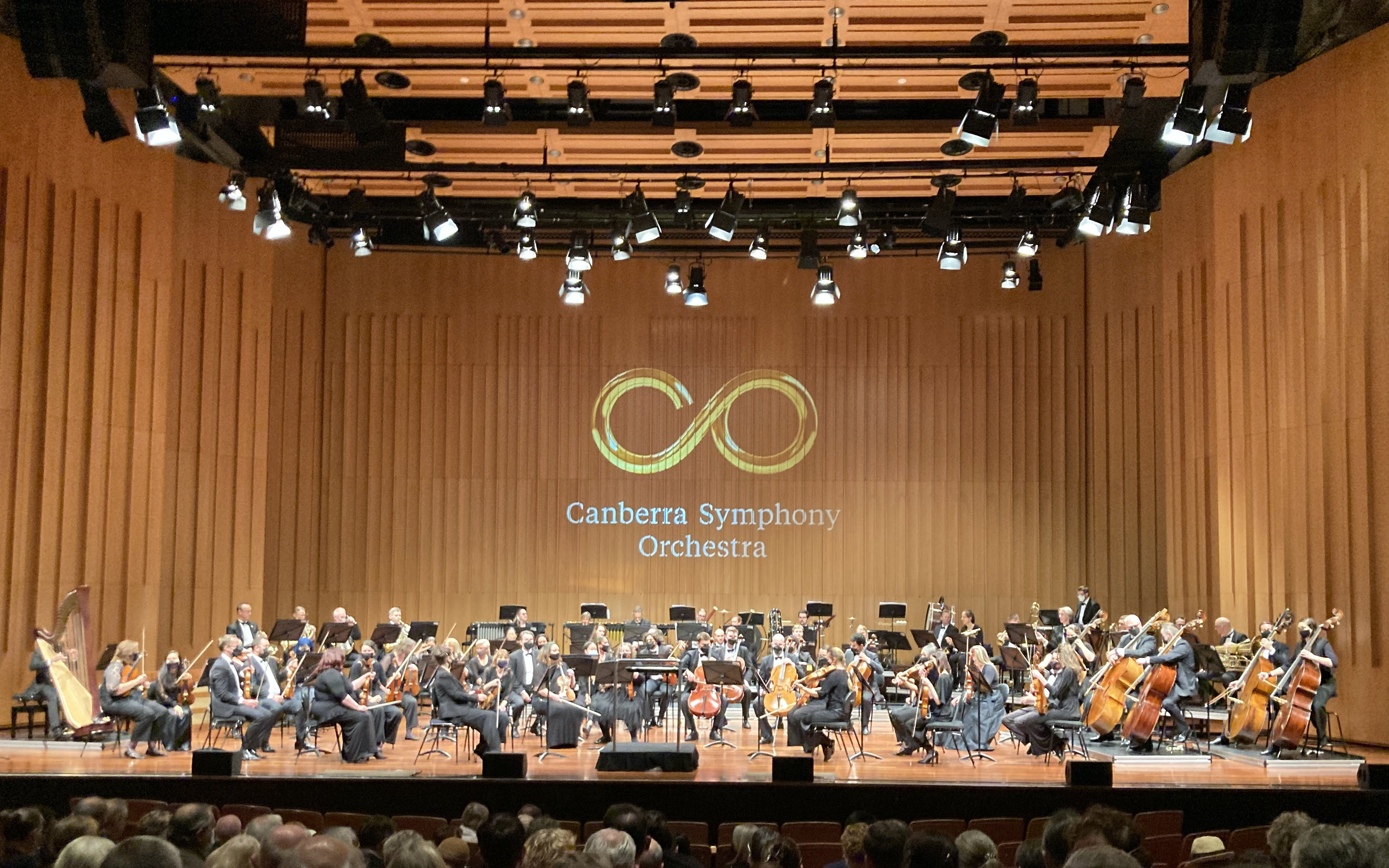
- Canberra Symphony Orchestra at Llewellyn Hall in 2022
- Short name: CSO
- Former name: Canberra Orchestral Society
- Founded: 14 March 1950
- Concert hall: Llewellyn Hall
- Principal conductor: Jessica Cottis
- Website: www.cso.org.au

Canberra Symphony Orchestra (CSO) is the professional orchestra of the Australian Capital Territory based in Canberra, the national capital of Australia.

== History ==
Officially formed on 14 March 1950 and registered as an amateur ensemble, the Canberra Orchestral Society (COS), held rehearsals in the ante-room of Albert Hall. In September 1953, Pieter Kruithof, a Dutch migrant with organ and choral background, was appointed conductor and director. At that time the orchestra had 18 members and shared quarters at the Riverside Cultural Centre. In the Netherlands, Kruithof had conducted choirs and orchestras for 16 years; in Canberra, as of June 1954, he worked as a cleaner at the ABC radio transmitter for 2CY. Concerts were also held in school halls and the Childers Street Hall of the Australian National University. On 8 June 1964, Pieter Kruithof died "after a long illness" and was survived by his wife and their four children.

Wilfred Holland from England, with a conducting and performance background, led the orchestra from April 1961. He also guided the Canberra Choral Society and the two organisations held joint performances of choral masterpieces.

In 1965 Ernest Llewellyn, former concertmaster of the Sydney Symphony Orchestra, became Director of the newly formed Canberra School of Music. In August of that year, he was also appointed conductor of the Canberra Orchestral Society. At the end of 1966 the society changed its name to Canberra Symphony Orchestra, with Llewellyn continuing as chief conductor and director. Llewellyn's reputation made it possible to recruit top professional players to teach at the School and to join the orchestra. The CSO performed at the newly opened Canberra Theatre.

Llewellyn continued to extend the orchestra until his retirement in November 1980, and the new School of Music auditorium was officially named Llewellyn Hall in his honour. Llewellyn worked with the CSO during 1981 as a guest conductor.

The CSO secured Leonard Dommett as the new conductor and musical director by July 1982. As the former concertmaster of the Melbourne Symphony Orchestra, Dommett brought a network of national and international artists to the CSO. Throughout the 1980s the orchestra continued to expand and artistic achievement was continually evolving.

Dommett retired in 1991 and the ensuing decade brought further change to the orchestra, including the implementation of fully professional status in 1994. Large opera gala concerts featured celebrity conductors such as Richard Bonynge and Isaiah Jackson.

When Richard Gill joined the CSO as chief conductor and artistic director in 2001, the organisation was going through difficult times. He brought much needed consistency and stability to the orchestra – and within a couple of years after his arrival, the CSO was back on a solid financial footing.

Nicholas Milton was appointed chief conductor and artistic director in 2007 and his passion, vision and expertise has inspired players and audiences alike. Milton is an Australian conductor now based in Germany who is a former violinist with the Macquarie Trio. Also in 2007 the CSO received Commonwealth Government funding for the first time, which has allowed for additional rehearsals and larger orchestras on stage.

For the Canberra Centenary season of 2013, the ACT Government enlisted the CSO to perform the world premiere of a commissioned work by Andrew Schultz, Symphony No. 3 – "Century", as a feature of the official Canberra Day celebrations in March 2013.

== Chief conductors ==
- 1953–1960 Pieter Kruithof (c. 1906–1964)
- 1961–1965 Wilfred Holland
- 1965–1980 Ernest Llewellyn
- 1980–1982 various conductors
- 1982–1991 Leonard Dommett
- 1991–2001 ????
- 2001–2007 Richard Gill
- 2007–2020 Nicholas Milton
- 2021–present Jessica Cottis
