= Robert Pikler =

Hungarian-Australian musician

Robert Pikler OBE
- Born: 24 January 1909; Budapest, Hungary
- Died: 16 January 1984 (aged 74); Sydney, Australia
- Occupations: Violinist; Violist; Academic teacher
- Organizations: Musica Viva; Sydney Symphony Orchestra; Sydney Conservatorium of Music
- Awards: Britannica Award

Robert Pikler (24 January 1909 – 16 January 1984) was a Hungarian-Australian violinist, violist and academic teacher.

== Biography ==
Pikler received his musical training in his native Budapest, first under Eugene Ormandy, then at the Franz Liszt Academy of Music, principally under Nándor Zsolt and Jenő Hubay. As a violinist he toured extensively in Central Europe, prior to taking his own orchestra to India in 1934. For the next eight years he appeared as director of the orchestra and as soloist in important concert and radio work in the Far East.

In 1946, following three years of internment in a Japanese camp during World War II, he took up residence in Sydney. The same year, he became leader of the original Musica Viva Chamber Music Players founded by Richard Goldner, giving concerts throughout Australia and New Zealand. In 1952 he accepted the invitation from Sir Eugene Goossens to become the principal viola of the Sydney Symphony Orchestra, a position he filled with great distinction for 14 years. Chamber music occupied much of his time outside orchestral duties.

During a four-month absence from Australia in 1962, he visited the United States, England, France, the Netherlands, Italy, Switzerland, Hungary and Austria. Leaving the Sydney Symphony Orchestra in 1966, he became Artistic Director and viola player for the Sydney String Quartet. At the same time he began teaching at the New South Wales Conservatorium of Music. The Sydney Conservatorium Chamber Orchestra which he founded in 1966 was the first Australian ensemble to undertake a tour of Southeast Asia on behalf of the Department of External Affairs.

Pikler received the Britannica Award in 1972 for his services to Australian music and in 1974 was appointed an Officer of the Order of the British Empire (OBE). He died in 1984, shortly before turning 75.

In 1980, as conductor of the Sydney Symphony Orchestra, he made various recordings devoted to Leopold Stokowski's orchestral arrangements of Johann Sebastian Bach.

== Notable pupils ==
Robert Pikler's pupils include:

- Robert Davidovici
- John Harding
- John Curro
- William Hennessy
- Elizabeth Holowell
- Cho-Liang Lin

== Sources ==
- Murdoch, James (1983). A handbook of Australian music. Melbourne: Sun Books. ISBN 978-0-7251-0419-1.
- Borer, Philippe (1 January 1988). Aspects of European influences on violin playing and teaching in Australia (Thesis). University of Tasmania. doi:10.25959/23236208.
