= Ian McDougall (architect) =

Ian Lachlan McDougall is Professor of Architecture and Urban Design at the University of Adelaide and a founding director of the Australian architecture firm Ashton Raggatt McDougall or ARM Architecture. His most significant projects include Melbourne Recital Centre and Melbourne Theatre Company's Southbank Theatre, Hamer Hall at Arts Centre Melbourne, masterplanning of Melbourne Docklands, Albury Library Museum and the Shrine of Remembrance Visitors Centre in Melbourne.

McDougall studied at RMIT University, and has also taught at that institution. He was awarded the Centenary Medal in 2001, and was made a Life Fellow of the Royal Australian Institute of Architects in 2004. His design work has had recognition in the professional arena for individual projects and as an urban designer. McDougall was also appointed to the Melbourne Festival Board of Directors in 2012.
