= Marcella Hempel =

Textile artist

Marcella Augusta Hempel, (born Tilg; 29 December 1915 – 9 December 2010), also known as Marcella Tilg-Senff, was a textile artist, second-generation Bauhaus master weaver, and lecturer in textiles.

She was one of many émigré artists who came to Australia after the second world war, bringing training and expertise from Europe. She became a respected leader in the Australian Crafts Movement. Hempel designed and wove products such as rugs and scarves which were commissioned or exhibited by Australian companies, private collectors and craft and art galleries. Her work received a gold medal award from the Australian Wool Board. She lectured in Dresden then at the University of Applied Arts in Berlin, taught textile design at East Sydney Technical College, was the inaugural lecturer in textiles at the Riverina-Murray Institute of Higher Education (formerly Riverina College of Advanced Education, now Charles Sturt University-Wagga Wagga campus) and was conferred with a Honoris Causa award of Bachelor of Arts (Visual Arts) after retirement. Her woven travel rugs are held in national art collections.

== Life and weaving career ==
=== Master weaver and lecturer in Germany ===
Tilg studied art in high school and aimed in her post-school life, "To help mankind". Her teacher took the class to a Bauhaus display home showing art in action which impressed Tilg so she decided to study at the Bauhaus when she finished high school. By then, the Bauhas school had been closed by the Nazi Party so Tilg studied weaving in Berlin from 1932 under Bauhaus trained Margaret Leischner at the Berlin College of Textile and Fashion, graduating in 1936 with a degree in handweaving and textile design.

She married Georg Friedrich Senff (1908–1944) in 1937, a commercial clerk who in 1934 with 14 other men, had been convicted by the Dresden Higher Regional Court of "preparing to commit treason" against the ruling Nazi Party. She and Senff had one child. Georg Senff died in Poland in 1944. From 1934 to 1946, Marcella Tilg-Senff designed fabrics for German and Danish industry.

In 1947 Tilg-Senff gained a master's certificate in handweaving, and between 1946 and 1950 lectured in Dresden then in East Berlin. Her teaching career in Germany was helped by Mart Stam, designer of the cantilever chair, who was a professor at the University of Applied Arts in Berlin when he appointed her in 1951 as lecturer in weaving then as a panel member for the Institute for Industrial Design.

In 1952 Tilg-Senff left East Germany and moved to England. The only permit that allowed her to leave East Germany was one to work as a domestic abroad. She worked as a live-in housekeeper in the UK (with her daughter). She maintained her friendship with Leischner, who became a leading teacher and weaver in England, visiting her in the UK in the 1950s before migrating to Australia and again in 1970 just before Leischner's death from cancer. About leaving Germany, in 1990 Hempel said in correspondence with John McPhee, then a curator at the National Gallery of Australia, “I did not want my child to grow up under a totalitarian regime which took the life of my husband, who had been a political prisoner under Hitler... My odyssey ended in Australia, where at last I did not feel in constant hopeless opposition to a regime, which denies its citizens integrity." She married Bruno Hempel in the UK.

=== Weaver and lecturer in Australia ===
Now known as Marcella Hempel, she sailed via South Africa to Sydney in 1954 with Bruno and two teenagers (her daughter and Bruno's son by his first marriage). She brought with her samples of her weaves, designs and professional documentation, and even a small hand loom, which helped her obtain work as a weaver and lecturer in Australia. The destination address the Hempels gave was the flat of Walter Andreas and Annemarie Dullo, refugees from Germany before WWII, who became chocolate makers in Australia, interned as enemy aliens during the war, then returned to Sydney and co-founded Musica Viva Australia with Richard Goldner. Between 1954 and 1957 Hempel designed upholstery fabric for a commercial weaving company in Sydney and taught for a while at East Sydney Technical College. About 1956, the Hempels bought a small sheep and dairy farm at Picton, NSW where Marcella also kept a flock of geese. Marcella (and sometimes Bruno) spun wool from her own sheep, combined it with other wool yarns, and created an individual weave that received a gold medal award from the Australian Wool Board. One of her first commissions at Picton was for curtains for the local Camden Hospital, woven in cotton. During her time in Picton, Hempel also opened a continental coffee lounge with a German friend, where they served their home-made cakes and brewed coffee and displayed Hempel's weaving.

Marcella and Bruno had a daughter while at the farm, with Marcella taking her toddler with her when she rose early to milk cows and later weaving and making rugs and other materials. Her eldest daughter was married by then, but still helped Marcella by collecting and delivering her rugs and other products. After awarding the gold medal, the Wool Board recommended Qantas commission Hempel to make 250 travel rugs to give to delegates at the International Air Transport conference in Sydney being hosted by Qantas in 1963. Hempel had three months to fulfill the commission. Bruno had an accident and did not have full use of his legs but wanted to help spin the yarn for the Qantas rugs so Marcella rigged up a hand spinner for him. She successfully produced the travel rugs and more commissions and sales of her woven textiles followed.

By the mid 60s, the marriage had broken down and most of the farm was sold, although Marcella and her daughter were able to keep and live in the cottage with a small plot of bushland surrounding them. She increased her efforts to support herself and her daughter as a weaver but kept to her principle of only producing as much as she could by hand from her own loom. Bruno Hempel died in Picton in 1969. In 1974 Marcella and her daughter moved to Wagga Wagga, New South Wales, where, with other weavers, she established a textile course at the former Riverina College of Advanced Education and was the inaugural lecturer in textiles from 1974 to 1980. She also taught weaving in community workshops. In 1989 the college awarded Hempel an honorary Bachelor of Arts (Visual Arts). At the presentation, senior lecturer Arthur Wicks described her as "a very direct and honest person and it shows through her work... She is without doubt a master craftsperson". An occasional address was made by Edmund Capon, then director of the Art Gallery of NSW. In reply, Hempel said "Culture is really what happens in the community” and the integrity of the individual making a contribution to the community was what was important. In 1990 the Wagga Wagga Art Gallery held an exhibition, "Students of Marcella Hempel" which included works by Hempel as well as her students.

Even when she was working as a designer or lecturer, Hempel maintained her own handweaving practice. Her work was promoted or sold by the Australian Wool Board, Australian Craftworks, Narek Craft Galleries, Design Arts Centre and the Crafts Council of Australia. By the late 90s. Hempel had moved to Canberra, where she set up her "loom room" to continue weaving. In 1994 she gave a talk at the Australian War Memorial on her experiences while living in Germany during the second world war at the "Children of the Holocaust" exhibition of drawings by Jewish children of Teresin ghetto.

In Australia, Hempel passed on her industrial design principles and weaving techniques both as a lecturer and in workshop presentations. She believed that all work should have an aim and a purpose. In 1971 she led a weaving workshop at "Creative Arts '71" at a lodge in Lamington National Park, Queensland and presented a session at the first Australian fibre conference in 1981 on “Tactile sensitivity”, talking about “the importance of the use of the hands for a balanced development of the individual”. She taught her students industrial design principles of harmonious design through colour, shape and texture. She wrote that the decisive factors in her career were the Bauhaus philosophy, the insistence on technical perfection and the application of efficient working methods from industry. One of her College of Advanced Education students said, "Marcella has encouraged me to develop her teaching into my own personal expression and to explore every area of weaving."

Curators and reviewers described her as having a devotion to craftsmanship and her weaves as being inspired by the colours of the Australian landscape. One of Hempel's travel rugs was shown in "The Fabric of Australian Society" exhibition. Hempel wrote in the catalogue, "The various Australian wools provided me with the raw material to create distinguished Australian designs which expressed my reaction to the rawness, the strength and immensity of the Australian landscape".

Hempel died in Canberra on 9 December 2010. Her death notice, written by her daughters, described her as "An honourable person throughout life. Respected second generation trained Bauhaus Master Weaver and teacher. Survivor of Nazi Germany and bombing of Dresden".

== Exhibitions and works ==
Hempel's exhibitions and most well-known works included:

- Good Neighbour Council exhibition, Anthony Hordern, Sydney, 1957 (group)
- Australian Wool Bureau/Board, Gold Medal, "Wool Fashion Awards" for handwoven sample rug, 1962
- 250 travel rugs commissioned by Qantas to give to delegates at the International Air Transport conference in Sydney, 1963
- Berrima Gallery, 1968 (solo)
- "Marcella Hempel”, Design Arts Centre, Brisbane, 1968, 1969, 1976 (solo)
- Hayloft Gallery, Bathurst, 1971 (solo)
- Narek Craft Galleries, "Marcella Hempel, Gino Sanguineti", 1972 (exhibited with a sculptor)
- "Fibre", Narek Galleries, Canberra, 1975 (group)
- Australian Wool Corporation, Australian weavers in wool, 1st annual exhibition, in association with Imago Gallery, 1978 (group)
- Australian Craftworks, "Marcella Hempel: Master weaver: A celebration of 50 years of weaving", Sydney, June–July, 1986 (solo)
- "Profile of Presence", Narek Galleries, Canberra, 1984 (group)
- "Students of Marcella Hempel", Wagga Wagga City Art Gallery, 1990 (group)
- “The Fabric of Australian Society” presented by the Melbourne Olympic Candidature, Melbourne, Tokyo, 1990 (group)
- "The Europeans: Emigre Artists in Australia 1930–1960" at the Australian National Gallery, (now National Gallery of Australia), Canberra, 1997 (group)
