= Holcman =

Holcman is a surname. Notable people with the surname include:

- David Holcman (fl. 2007), French scientist
- Ludwik Holcman (1889–1942), Polish violinist
