= Romola Costantino =

Australian musician (1930–1988)

Romola Helen Louise Costantino, also known as Romola Enyi, OBE (14 September 1930 – November 1988) was an Australian pianist, accompanist and teacher, who also worked as a music, film and theatre critic.

== Biography ==
Costantino was the daughter of Napoleone Costantino (1889–1982), an Italian civil servant in Australia, and his Wales-born wife, Rosamond Lindner (1898–1963). She studied at the NSW Conservatorium of Music under Alexander Sverjensky.

She gave many broadcasts and recitals for the ABC, most notably as an accompanist for musicians such as Ruggiero Ricci and Henryk Szeryng (on his 4th and last Australian tour in 1984).

Costantino gave the first solo piano recital in the Sydney Opera House on 10 April 1973 to an invited audience. She also participated in the first public performance in the Opera House's Music Room alongside the Carl Pini Quartet and Walter Sutcliffe; this event was held under the auspices of Musica Viva Australia. She also formed a well known piano duo with Lance Dossor.

She was a member of the inaugural committee of the Accompanists' Guild of South Australia in 1983, and was President of the Guild from 1984 to 1986.

She recorded Schubert's Arpeggione Sonata with Robert Pikler, viola, and Mozart's Kegelstatt Trio with Pikler and Pamela Johnson, clarinet. She also recorded two Schubert piano sonatas that had been left unfinished by Schubert and completed by Walter Dullo. Other recordings include Ravel's La valse, and pieces by Debussy and Fauré, as well as a Telemann trio sonata for the (long-defunct) AWA record label in which she played the clavichord.

She was a senior lecturer at the University of Sydney. She was also a music critic for the Sydney Morning Herald. and a film and theatre critic for the Sun-Herald.

== Personal life ==
In 1971, Costantino married George Enyi, an artist and sculptor, and sometimes used her married name Romola Enyi.

She was musical consultant for the film Between Wars (1974).

== Honours ==
In the New Year's Day Honours of 1978, she was appointed an Officer of the Order of the British Empire for her services to the arts.

== Death ==
Romola Costantino died in 1988 in Adelaide, South Australia, aged 58, from cancer. Many of her programs and other papers are held at the National Library of Australia.
