= Simon Pullman =

Polish violinist and conductor (1890 - 1942)

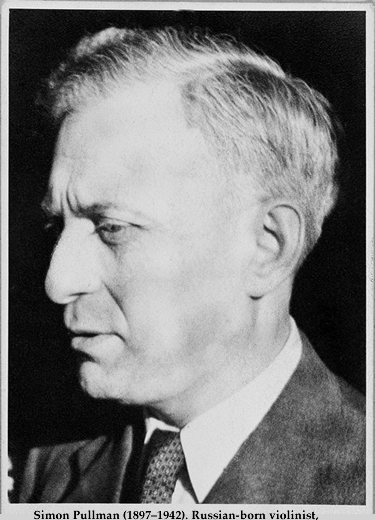

Background information
- Born: 15 February 1890; Warsaw, Poland
- Died: 1942 (aged 52); Treblinka extermination camp, Poland
- Genres: Chamber music
- Occupation(s): Violinist, conductor, music teacher
- Instrument: Violin
- Years active: 1915–1942

Simon Pullman (15 February 1890 – August 1942) was a Polish violinist, conductor, music teacher and founder and director of the Pullman Ensemble and Orchestra, and a seminal figure in the evolution of chamber music performance.

== Early life and education ==
Born in Warsaw, he was a nephew of the famous Yiddish actress Ester Rachel Kamińska and a cousin of Ida Kamińska and Josef Kamińsky. He studied with Leopold Auer at the Saint Petersburg Conservatory (1905–1909) where he received his diploma. In 1913, he continued his studies with Martin Pierre Marsick at the Conservatoire de Paris.

== Musical career ==
Back in Warsaw, he founded and led a chamber orchestra specialised on music of the Vienna Classic (1915 to 1920). In the 1920s and 1930s, he taught violin, viola, and chamber music at the Neues Wiener Konservatorium (New Vienna Conservatory), where he coached several groups including the Galimir String Quartet (led by Felix Galimir). He befriended Welsh novelist Dorothy Edwards during her stay in Vienna in the mid 1920s.

In 1930, he founded the Pullman Ensemble, consisting of 17 string players (4 string quartets with a double-bass), whose speciality was the performance of Beethoven's Große Fuge, Op. 133, and String Quartet in C♯ minor, Op. 131. Later, 10 wind players were added to form the Pullman Orchestra, which performed regularly in Vienna and throughout Europe until 1938, when Pullman was able to escape to Paris.

According to his students and colleagues, Pullman was a visionary musician; his desire for a kind of revelatory ensemble playing led him to make use of the widest possible range of string tone, to demand a perfect legato, and to search out highly unorthodox fingerings to match his conceptions of phrasing. Rehearsals were intense and long; however, they functioned as rolling all-day affairs where members came and went as their schedules permitted. Through his pupils Felix Galimir, Richard Goldner, and others, his ideas influenced the training of generations of chamber music performers in the U. S., Australia (Musica Viva Australia), and elsewhere.

== Second World War ==
In August 1939, he visited Warsaw in an attempt to sell a house belonging to his wife, and was trapped there by the German invasion. Imprisoned in the Warsaw Ghetto, he directed (guided by the orchestra founders Marian Neuteich and Adam Furmanski) the Warsaw Ghetto Symphony Orchestra, which included among notable musicians, Ludwik Holcman. The band performed frequently from 1940 to 1942. Pullman was transported to Treblinka extermination camp in early August 1942, and like him, all of the members of the orchestra were presumed to have been killed.
