= RHG =

RHG may refer to:

- Red House Group, a group of artists in Adelaide, South Australia
- Rehden–Hamburg gas pipeline
- Rainforest hunter-gatherers, or African Pygmies
