= Streeton Trio =

The Streeton Trio is an Australian classical piano trio comprising violinist Emma Jardine, pianist Bernadette Harvey and cellist Rachel Siu.

The trio was founded in 2008 in Geneva, Switzerland, by Benjamin Kopp, Emma Jardine, and cellist Martin Smith, and named after the Australian painter Sir Arthur Streeton.

Kopp was a finalist in the 2007 ABC Symphony Australia Young Performers Awards in the keyboard category; Jardine has performed with the Orchestre de la Suisse Romande; and Clerici was principal cellist of the Sydney Symphony Orchestra from 2014 to 2021.

The Streeton Trio won the 2011 Musica Viva Chamber Music Competition.

From 2010 to 2013, the trio studied at the European Chamber Music Academy.

Formerly based in Switzerland and then Germany, the trio is now based in Sydney, Australia, and performs internationally. They have made three recordings, including a CD of the music of Elena Kats-Chernin, another with works by Joseph Haydn, Ludwig van Beethoven and Roger Smalley, and another with trios by Maurice Ravel and Johannes Brahms.
