= Howard Raggatt =

Australian architect

Howard Raggatt is an Australian architect, member of the firm Ashton Raggatt McDougall, and best known for the design of the National Museum of Australia, opened in 2001.
