= Suzanne Baker =

Australian filmmaker, journalist, and academic

Suzanne Baker AM
- Born: 1939 (age 86–87); England
- Education: University of Sydney (BA (Hons), 2006)
- Occupations: Producer, journalist, writer

Suzanne Dale Baker AM (born 1939) is an Australian film producer, print and television journalist, writer, historian, and feminist. In 1977, she became the first Australian woman to win an Academy Award, winning for the animated short film Leisure in the category Academy Award for Best Animated Short Film.

== Early life and education ==
Suzanne Dale Baker was born in England in 1939, while her Australian parents were visiting that country. Her parents were New Zealand-born writer and philologist Sidney J. Baker (best known as the author of The Australian Language, a work that was highly praised by America's H. L. Mencken in The American Language) and his first wife Sally Baker (née Eena Dale Young), who separated when Baker was seven and divorced when she was eleven. She has a younger sister, Stephanie. When she was twelve, her mother married Lindsay Clinch, a newspaper editor. Her father also remarried twice.

Baker attended Sydney Girls High School but left school at age 15.

When her stepfather was appointed to run the New York office of John Fairfax and Sons, Baker accompanied him and studied television production at New York University and worked for NBC.

== Career ==
On return to Australia, Baker worked as a journalist for the ABC and was a producer for Bob Sanders' People. Her career then took her to the United Kingdom, where she worked for Thames TV, and then back to Australia in 1971 to work with the Sydney Morning Herald, where she modernised the women's section called Look!

In 1972, Baker was a founding member of the Media Women's Action Group.

In 1973, Baker joined Film Australia as its first female film producer. In this capacity, she was nominated for, and won, the Academy Award for Best Animated Short Film for the animated film Leisure, directed by Bruce Petty, at the 49th Academy Awards, presented in 1977. This made her the first Australian woman to win an Academy Award. She did not attend the ceremony, as Film Australia had a limited budget for overseas travel and she was not expected to win. The award was accepted on her behalf by the presenter, Marty Feldman.

In 1978, Baker led a television crew to China to make the five-part documentary series The Human Face of China, which was released worldwide in 1980. She also wrote the accompanying book.

Her interest in film making having waned, Baker left Film Australia in 1984 and entered the University of Sydney as a mature age student, completing an honours degree in history in 2006. Her thesis, titled "Realising an Absent Presence", sought to recognise the influence of women on Australian literature, an influence that had long been neglected in Australian literature studies, including in her own father's work, The Australian Language (1945).

In 2011, Baker published Beethoven and the Zipper: The Astonishing Story of Musica Viva, which detailed how an Austrian immigrant to Australia, Richard Goldner, invented and patented a zip fastener for the Australian Army, and used the proceeds to establish Musica Viva Australia in 1945, which went on to become the world's largest entrepreneurial chamber music organisation. The book was optioned for a movie by Tree Productions (producer Brian Rosen). The screenplay (working title The Musician) is by Joan Sauers and the movie was slated for release in late 2020, the year of the 75th anniversary of Musica Viva.

== Filmography ==
- 1965: On Being a Sheila
- 1967: A Bird's Eye View
- 1975: Sister, If You Only Knew
- 1975: A Say in Your Community with the Australian Assistance plan
- 1976: Leisure
- 1976: Seeing Red and Feeling Blue
- 1979: The Human Face of China (five-part documentary series)
- 1979: Saturday
- 1983: The Weekly's War
- 1984: After the Flood
- 1986: Land of Hope (10-part TV series)

== Awards ==
- 1977: Academy Award, Best Animated Short Film, for Leisure
- 1980: Henry Lawson Award, for The Human Face of China
- 2019: Member of the Order of Australia (AM)

== See also ==
- List of Australian Academy Award winners and nominees
