= Melbourne Recital Centre =

Building for music performances in Melbourne, Australia

Coordinates: 37.8241203°S 144.9678665°E

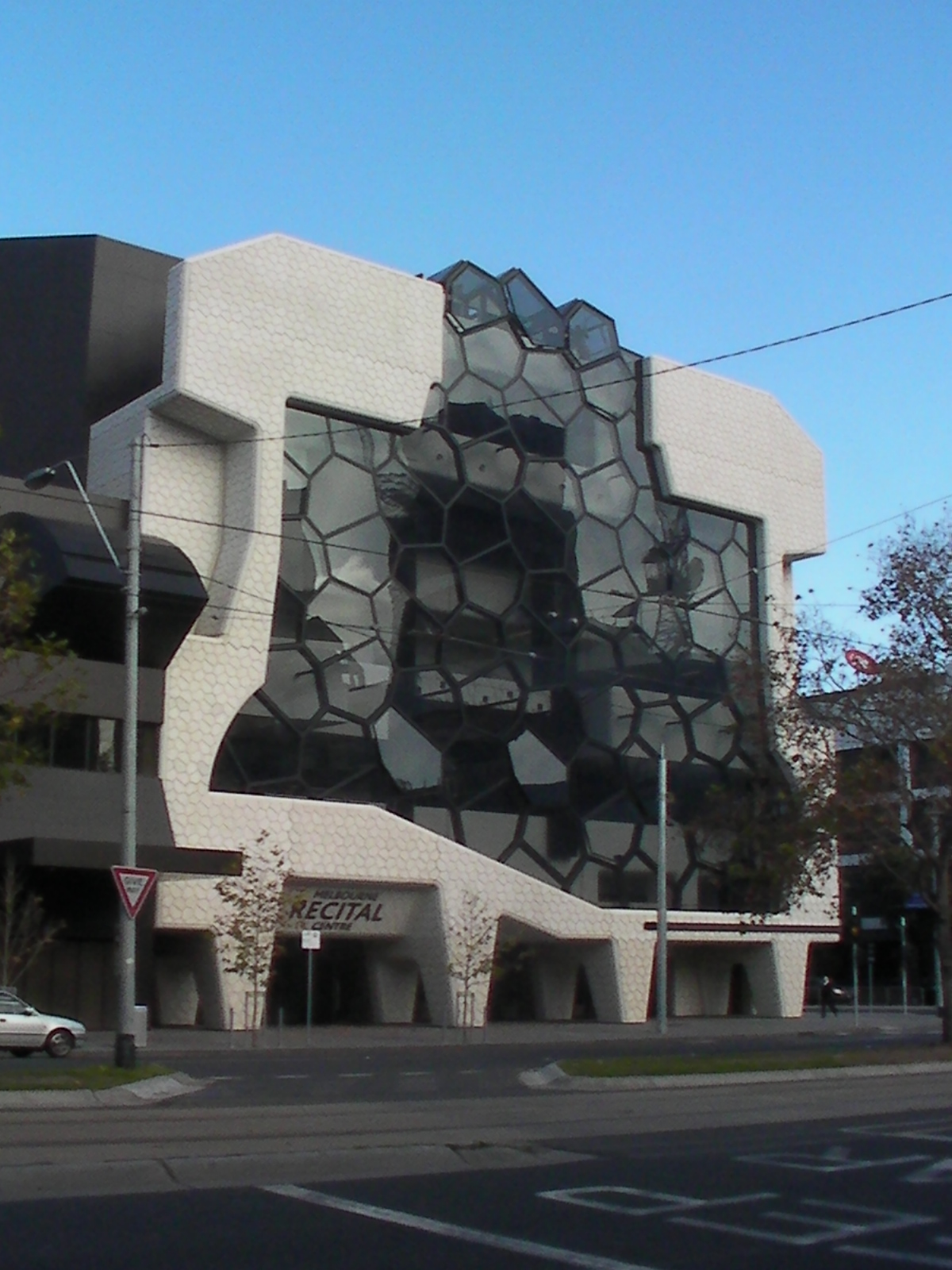
- Melbourne Recital Centre, part of the Melbourne Arts Precinct
- Interactive map of Melbourne Recital Centre
- Address: Corner of Southbank Boulevard and Sturt Street; Melbourne; Australia
- Owner: Melbourne Recital Centre Ltd. (Government of Victoria)
- Capacity: 1000 (Elisabeth Murdoch Hall)
- Type: Concert and Recital Hall

Construction
- Opened: 2009
- Architect: Ashton Raggatt McDougall

Website
- www.melbournerecital.com.au

Melbourne Recital Centre (MRC) is a venue and organisation for live music in Melbourne, Victoria, Australia. The organisation programs and presents more than 500 concerts and events a year across diverse range of musical genres including classical and chamber music, contemporary, pop, folk, rock, electronica, indie, jazz, cabaret and world music. Opened in 2009, the centre is Melbourne's second largest auditorium for classical music.

== History ==
The building was opened in 2009, as part of the Melbourne Recital Centre and Melbourne Theatre Company Southbank Theatre complex designed by Ashton Raggat McDougall, with acoustic and theatre consulting by Arup.

== Location and facilities ==
Melbourne Recital Centre is located on the corner of Southbank Boulevard and Sturt Street in the Melbourne Arts Precinct, Southbank. It is Melbourne's second largest auditorium for classical music (after Hamer Hall in Arts Centre Melbourne).

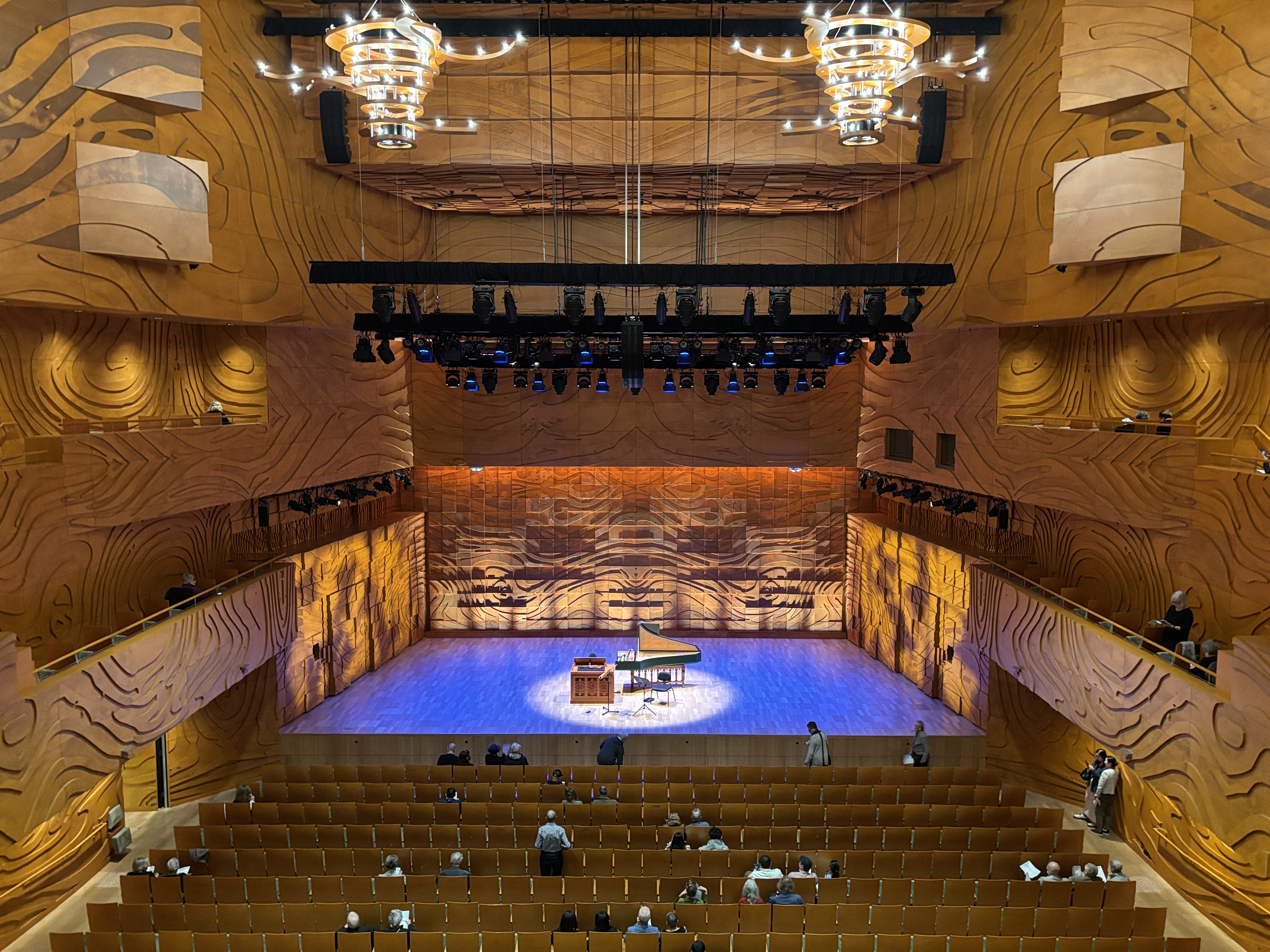
The Elisabeth Murdoch Hall

The centre features two auditoria, the Elisabeth Murdoch Hall, and a smaller Salon. The former, a "modified shoe box" shaped music venue, is named after Dame Elisabeth Murdoch. It has seating for 1000 on two levels.

The 135 m^{2} (1,450 sq ft) stage, with optional 51 m^{2} (550 sq ft) extension is designed to accommodate up to 45–65 musicians, making it well suited to chamber music and other small ensemble music. To eliminate noise from the nearby Southbank Boulevard cars and trams, it is surrounded by 250mm of concrete, mounted on 38 steel springs. The interior is lined with Hoop Pine plywood and is designed to give ideal bass response for cello and low brass. The shoebox shape, size and wooden surfaces were designed to provide a reverberation time of 1.6 to 1.8 seconds

The Salon can seat 136 people. The lighting, seating and stage can be configured to suit the performance.

== Governance ==
Kathryn Fagg AO was for some years around 2014 to 2016 chair of MRC.

As of April 2024, the board is headed by Andrea Hull.

== Activities and events ==
The organisation programs and presents more than 500 concerts and events a year across diverse range of musical genres including classical and chamber, contemporary, pop, folk, rock, electronica, indie, jazz, cabaret and world music.

=== Competitions ===
In 2013, the Asia-Pacific Chamber Music Competition was presented by Chamber Music Australia in association with the Melbourne Recital Centre (MRC). Murdoch University, Arts Victoria, Musica Viva, and ABC Classic FM were all partners, and Dame Elisabeth Murdoch was patron.

In 2016, Musica Viva took over co-management of the Melbourne International Chamber Music Competition, together with MRC and the Australian National Academy of Music.

== Awards ==
=== Architecture awards ===
Melbourne Recital Centre and MTC Theatre complex won the Moore Stephens National Award for Public Buildings at the Property Council of Australia – the country's highest award for a public building. The complex also won the Victorian Architecture Medal, the William Wardell Award for Public Architecture and the Joseph Reed Award for Urban Design at the Australian Institute of Architects Victoria Chapter State Architecture Awards in 2009.

=== Music venue awards ===
The Music Victoria Awards are an annual awards night celebrating Victorian music. They commenced in 2006. The award for Best Venue was introduced in 2016.

Year	Nominee / work	Award	Result	Ref.
Music Victoria Awards of 2016	Melbourne Recital Centre	Best Venue (Over 500 Capacity)	Nominated	
Music Victoria Awards of 2017	Melbourne Recital Centre	Best Venue (Over 500 Capacity)	Nominated	
Music Victoria Awards of 2018	Melbourne Recital Centre	Best Venue (Over 500 Capacity)	Nominated	
Music Victoria Awards of 2019	Melbourne Recital Centre	Best Venue (Over 500 Capacity)	Nominated	
Music Victoria Awards of 2020	Melbourne Recital Centre	Best Venue (Over 500 Capacity)	Nominated	
2021 Music Victoria Awards	Melbourne Recital Centre	Best Venue (Over 500 Capacity)	Won	
2022 Music Victoria Awards	Melbourne Recital Centre	Best Large Venue (Metro)	Nominated	

== See also ==
- The Arts Centre (Melbourne)
- Architectural acoustics
