= Storey Hall =

Former cinema in Melbourne, Victoria, Australia

- RMIT Building 16
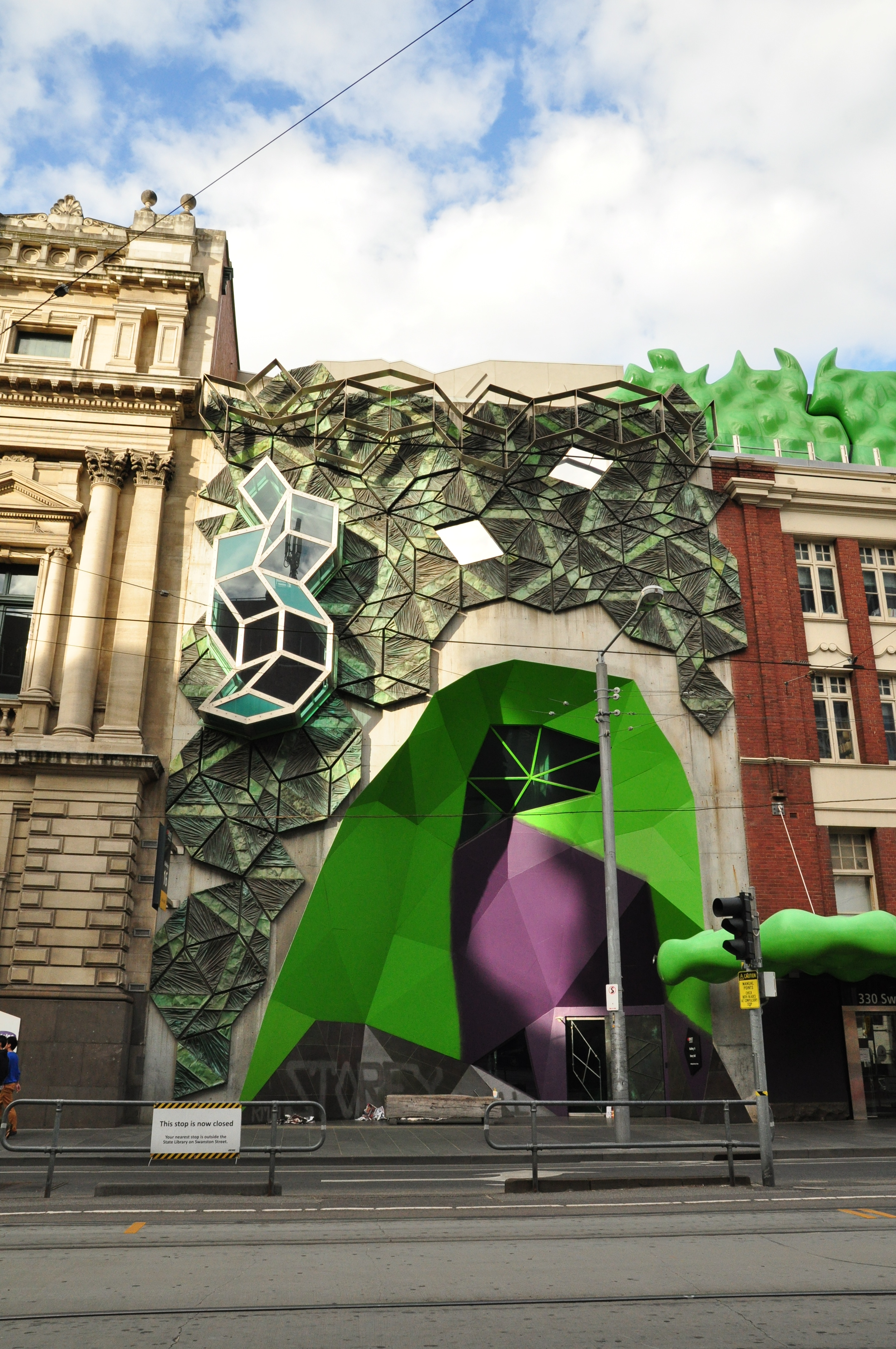
- Postmodern 1996 annex of Storey Hall on Swanston Street
- Interactive map of the Storey Hall area

General information
- Type: Education
- Architectural style: Neoclassical (1887 wing), Postmodern (1996 annex)
- Location: 342—344 Swanston Street, Melbourne, Victoria, Australia
- Completed: 1887
- Renovated: 1996
- Cost: £25,000 (1887 wing)
- Renovation cost: A$10.5 million (1996 annex)
- Owner: RMIT

Design and construction
- Architecture firm: Tappin, Gilbert and Dennehy (1887 wing), Ashton Raggatt McDougall (1996 annex)
- Awards: National Interior Architecture Award, 1996; Victorian Architecture Medal, 1996; William Wardell Award for Institutional Architecture, 1996; Marion Mahony Griffin Award for Interior Architecture, 1996; Dulux Colour Awards, National Award, 1996

Storey Hall, located at 342–344 Swanston Street in Melbourne, Australia, is part of The Royal Melbourne Institute of Technology (RMIT University) City Campus. The building consists of a grand meeting chamber constructed in 1887, which was extended and renovated in 1996. It provides a large upper hall for meetings and events, while the lower hall is home to RMIT Gallery First Site, and a range of lecture theatres and seminar rooms.

== History ==
The hall was built by the Hibernian-Australasian Catholic Benefit Society, formed in 1885, for the local Irish Catholic community, and called Hibernian Hall. The architects were Tappin, Gilbert & Dennehy, and the contractors were O'Dea & Kennedy, and it opened to great fanfare in November 1887. There was a meeting room and offices downstairs, and a large hall upstairs, complete with gallery, and the facade features a high rusticated base, and giant order Corinthian columns above, all executed in fine stone. The Society ran into difficulties and had to sell in 1903, and by 1907 it was known as the Guild Hall, used for art exhibitions, a cinema and as a wrestling venue. From 1917-1919 it was occupied by the Women's Political Association, dedicated to women's suffrage and other political reforms, and became a commune to support wharf workers during the 1917 General Strike.

It was purchased Royal Melbourne Institute of Technology (now RMIT University) in 1957. In 1959 the hall was named after the Storey family; Sir John Storey (Senior), who left a large bequest to RMIT in order to found the John Storey Junior Memorial Scholarships in memory of his son, and John Storey (Junior), who founded the RMIT Student Union in 1944, and whose studies were cut short in 1947 when he died of leukaemia at age 22.

A major refurbishment of the hall, and a large addition to the south was completed in 1996 to the design of Ashton Raggatt McDougall.

The ground level of the original hall houses the RMIT First Site Gallery, which is operated by the RMIT Union, and has a focus on new media, as well as a cafe named re:vault.

== Architecture ==
One of the key influences in the design of the Storey Hall annex is the use of Penrose’s tiling pattern, developed by Roger Penrose. The street façade is a version of the historic hall next door, its basic shapes of arch below and window above transformed by applying the Penrose pattern. The precast Penrose patterned tiles incorporate the impression of ruffles, keys and suspender belts to represent the suffragettes of the Women's Political Association. The colours of purple and green also reflect those of the women's liberation movement, with the green, used more extensively inside, referring to the Hibernian Hall’s construction by the Irish community of Melbourne. The foyer contains off-form concrete walls and columns with a curved stairwell. The main auditorium’s ceiling and large areas of wall are composed of geometric Penrose tile patterns in green and white.

Storey Hall is both architecturally and historically significant as it has won numerous awards and combines both the historical and traditional aspects of the former Hibernian Hall to create a complex and daring building.

Storey Hall could be said to represent the Deconstructivism strain of postmodern architecture, and contrasts for instance with the more ordered and facade of RMIT Building 8 on the other side of Storey Hall.

The Storey Hall refurbishment was one of the first buildings in Melbourne to use computer and digital fabrication, necessary to produce the complex yet mathematical elements of the architecture.

== Gallery ==
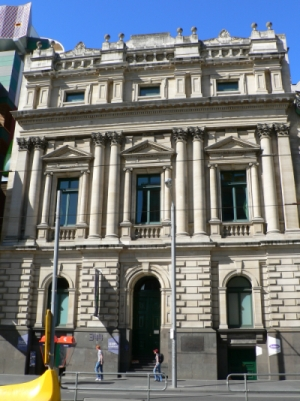
Hibernian Hall facade

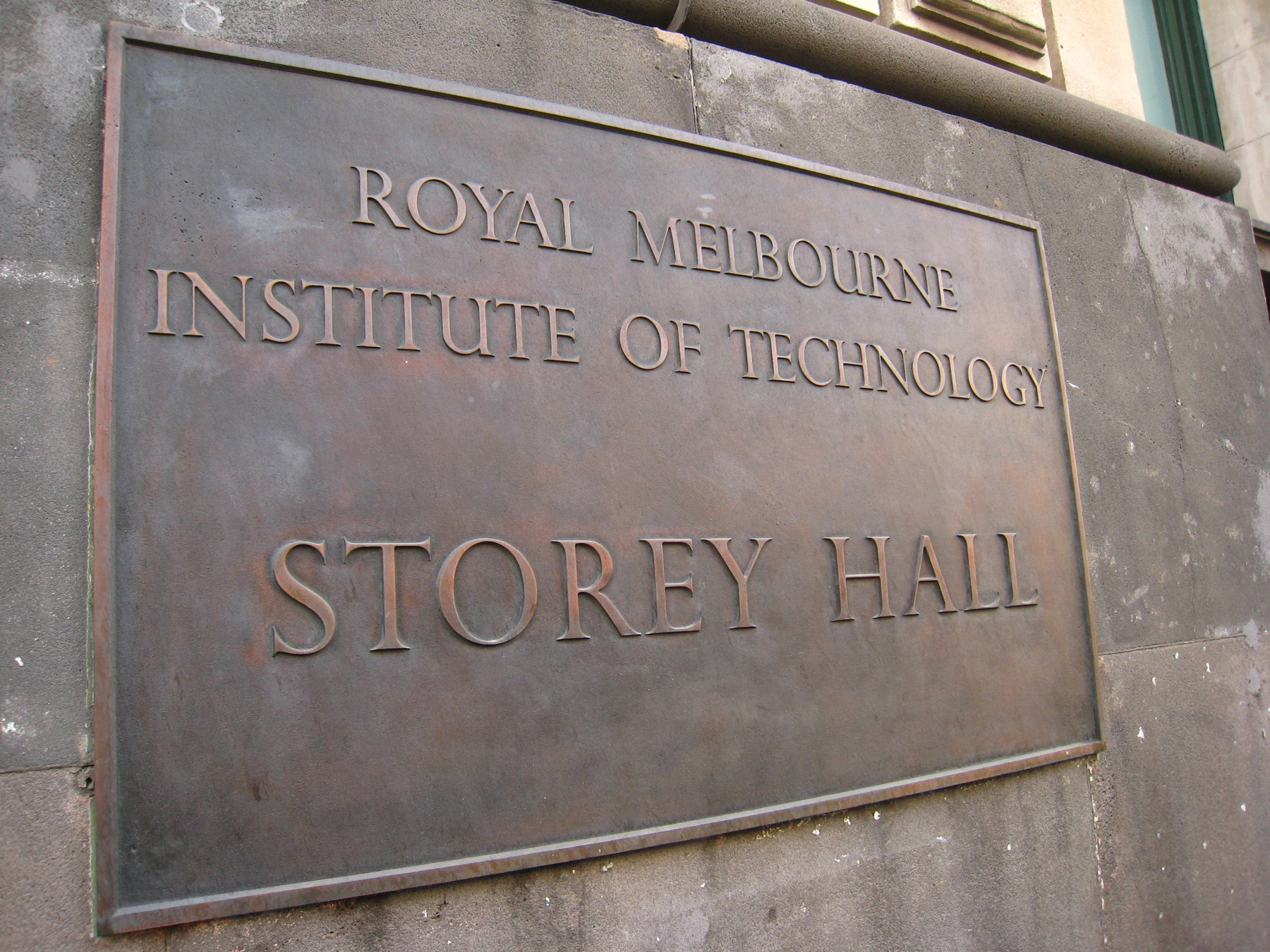
Storey Hall nameplate

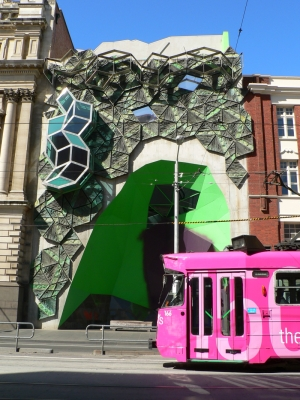
Storey Hall extension

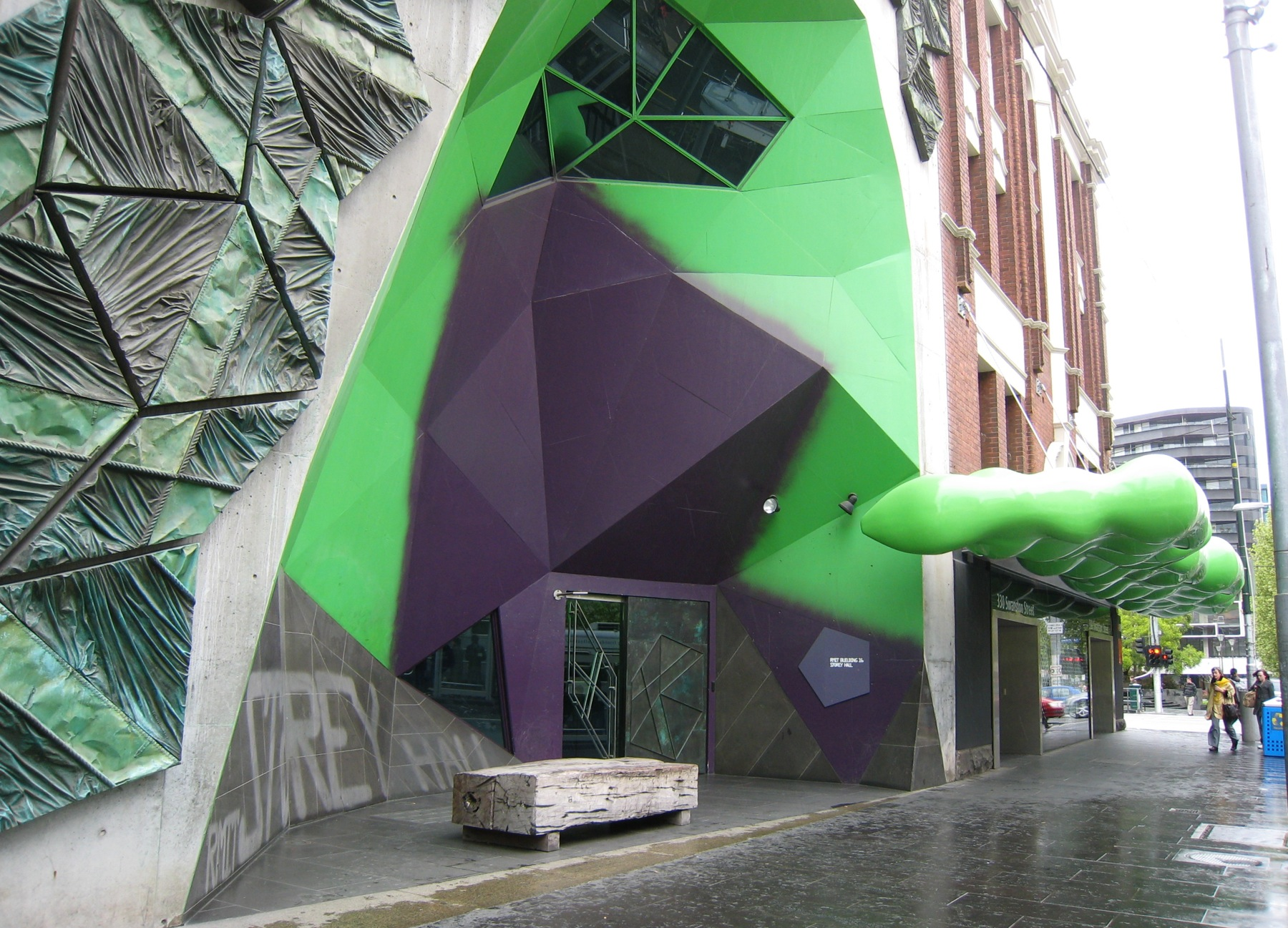
Storey Hall extension

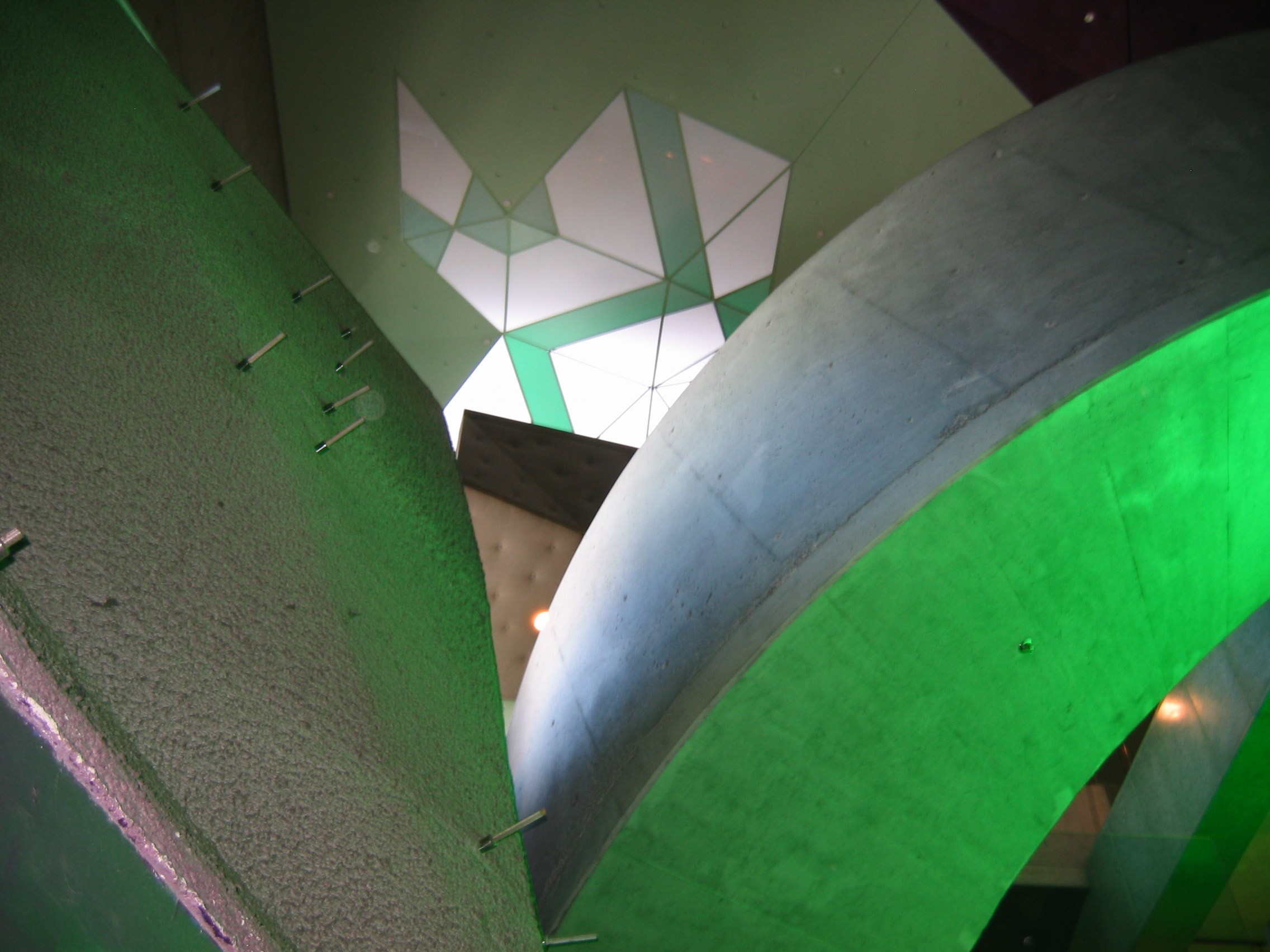
Looking up inside Storey Hall extension lobby

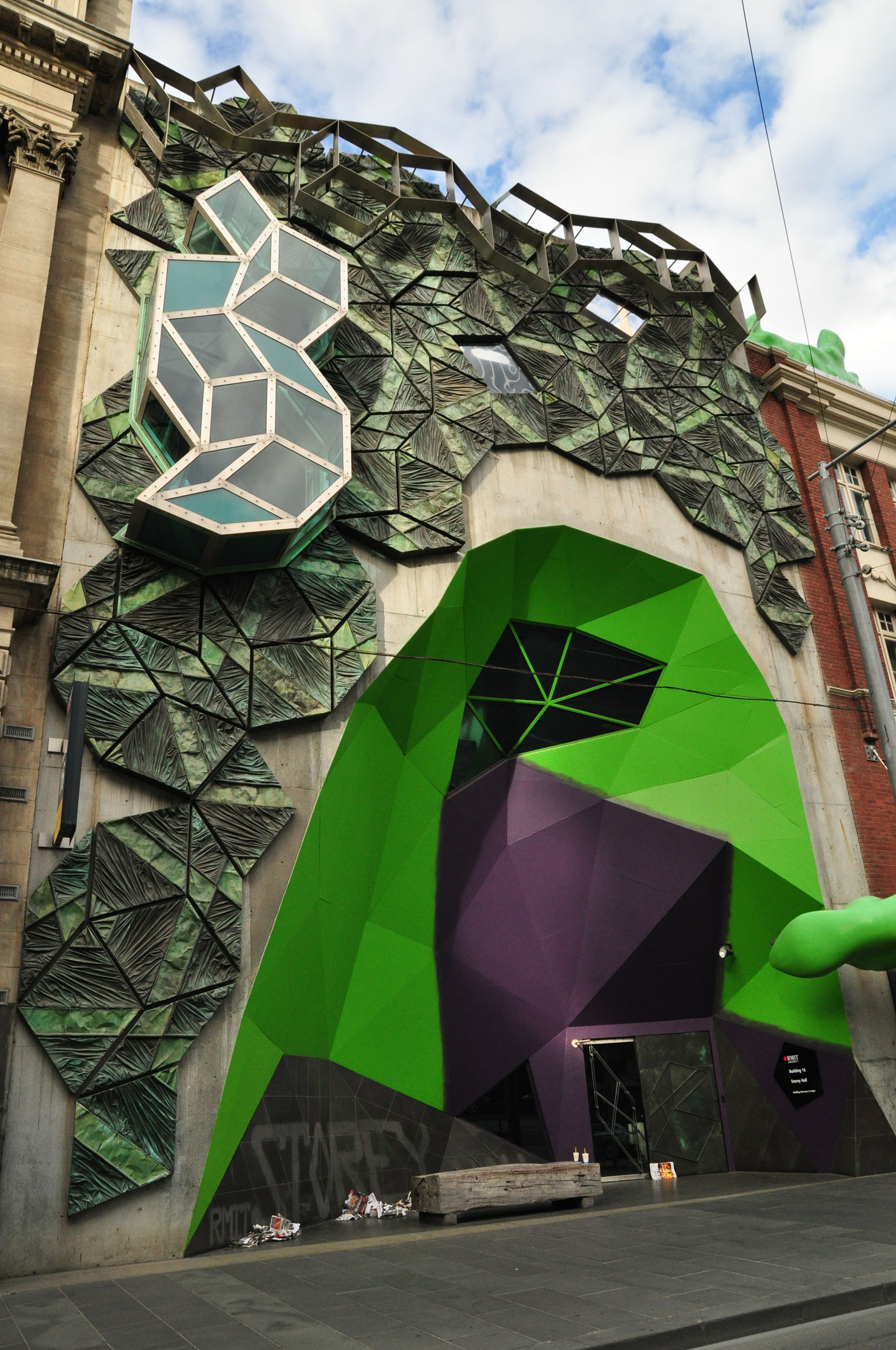
Storey Hall extension entry on Swanston Street

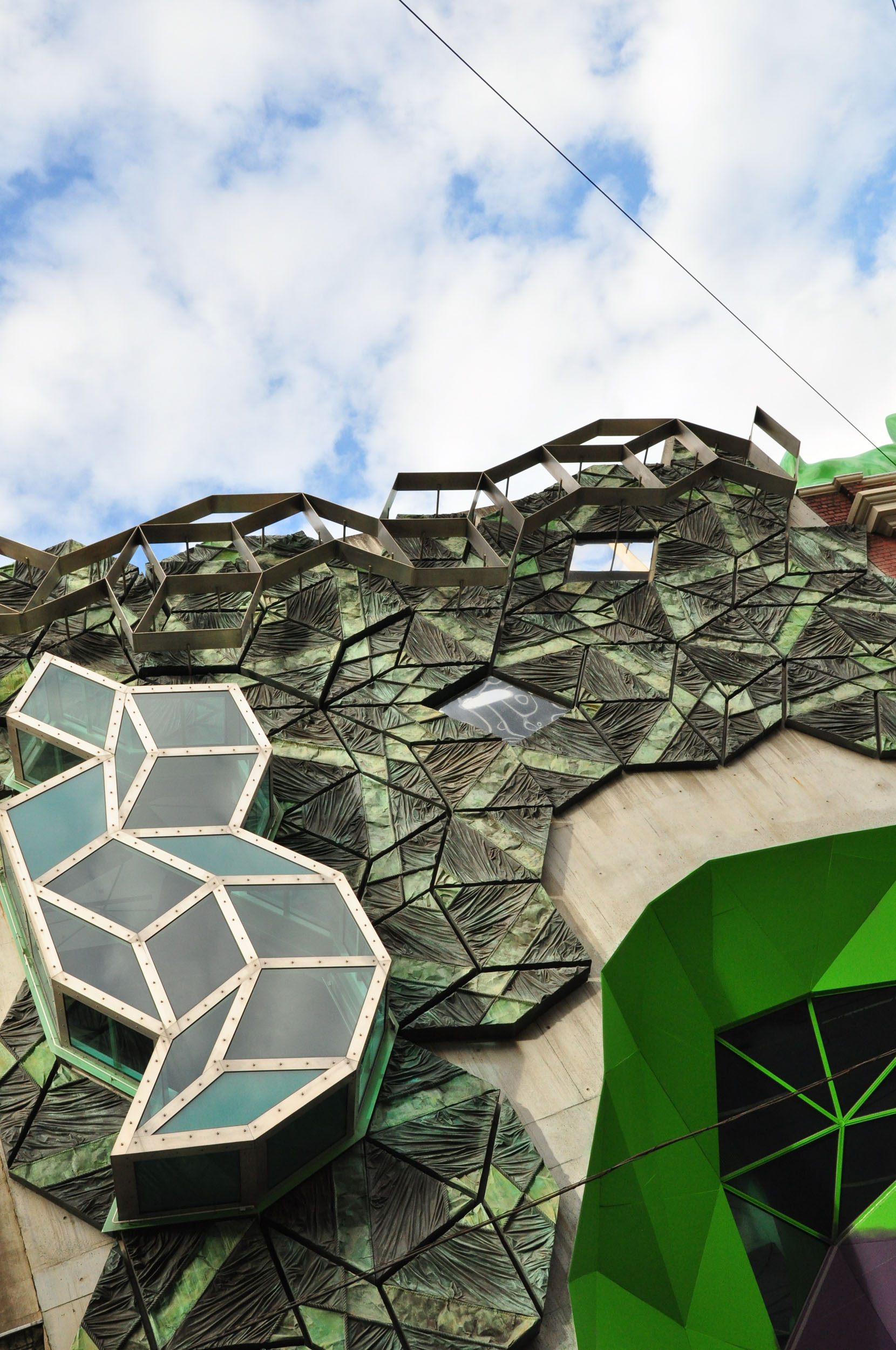
Storey Hall extension tiled elements

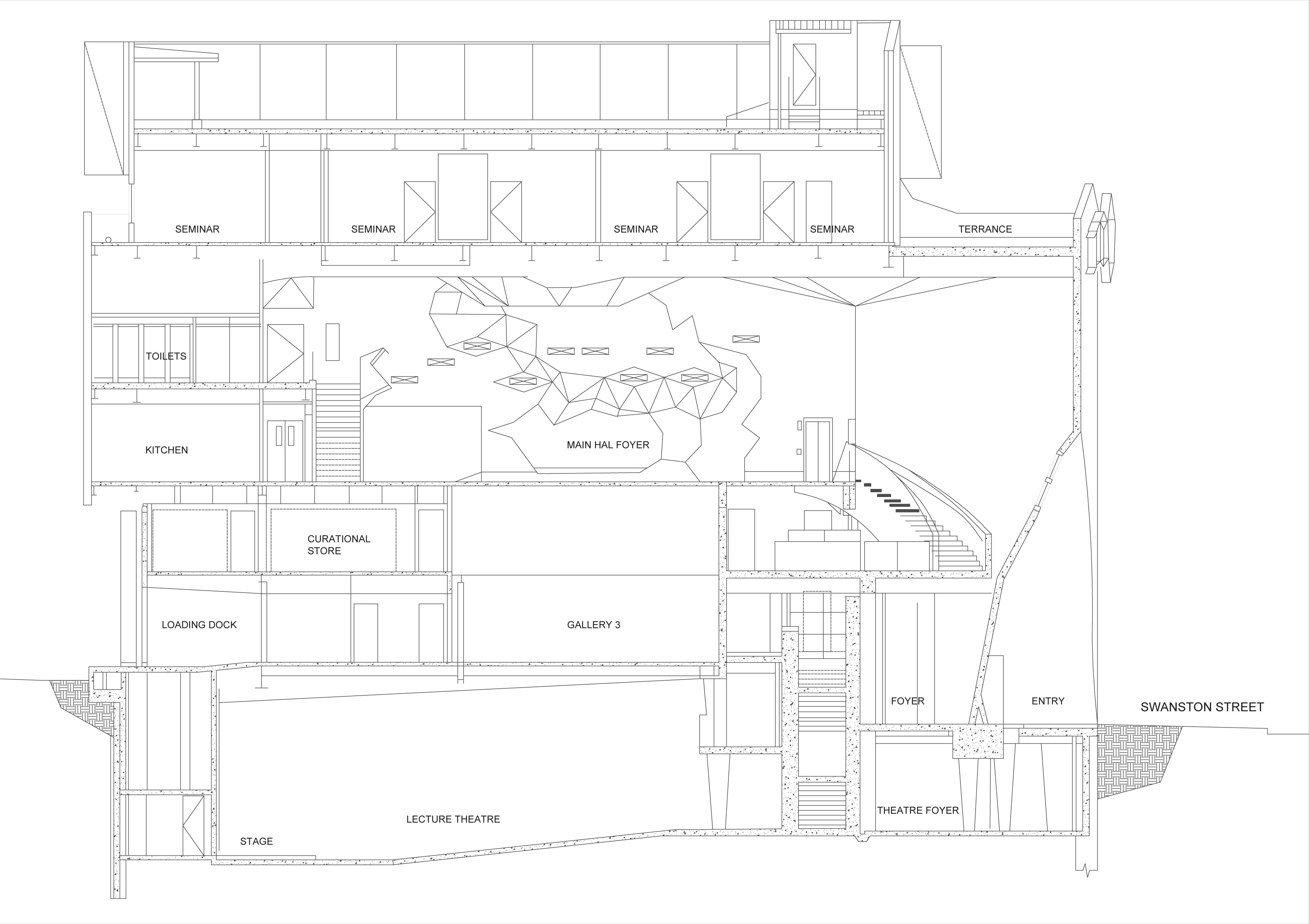
Section

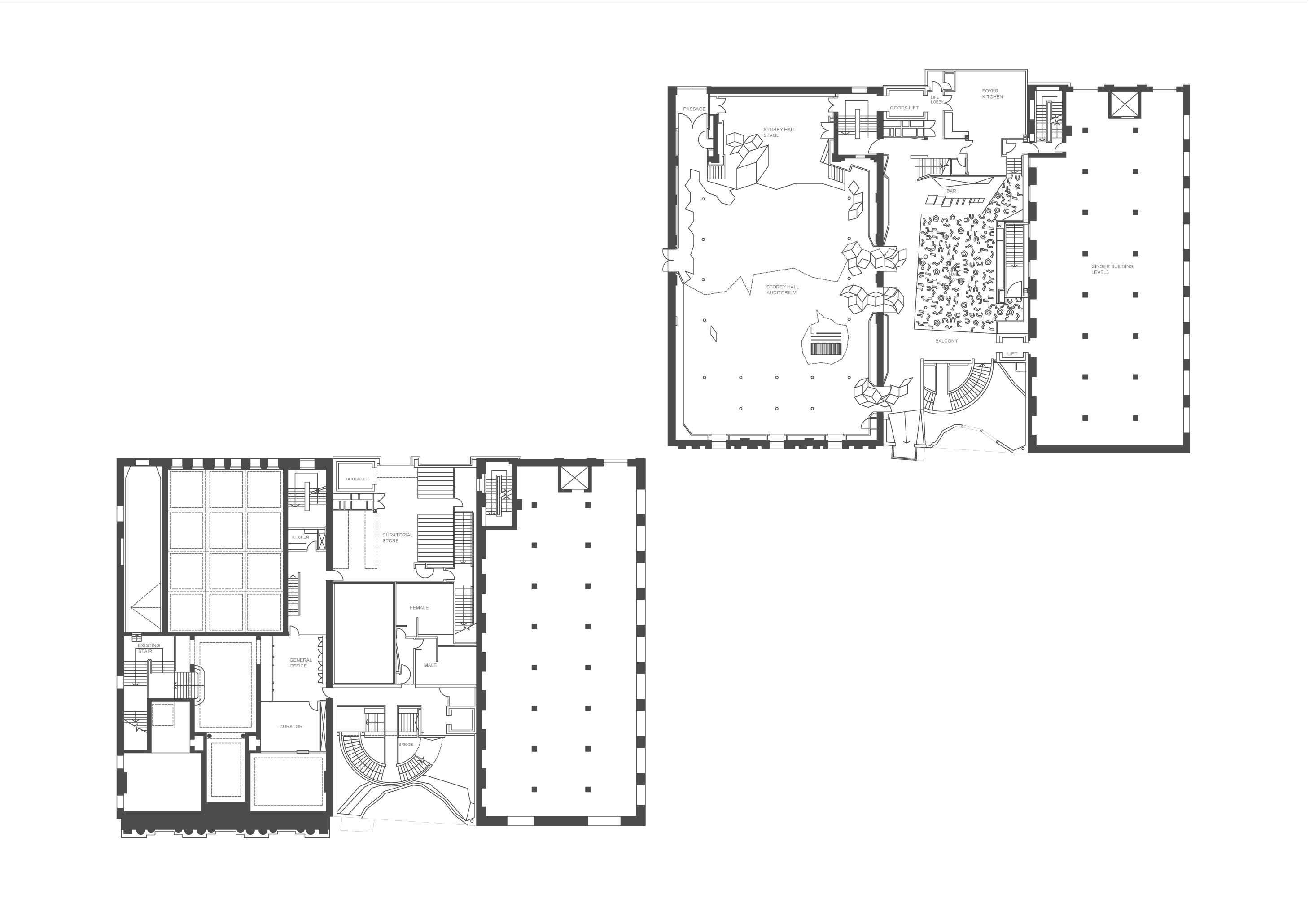
Plan

== Awards ==
- RAIA Victorian Architecture Medal, 1996
- RAIA William Wardell Award for Institutional Architecture, 1996
- RAIA National Interior Architecture Award, 1996
- RAIA Marion Mahony Award for Interior Architecture, 1996 (Victoria)R
- RAIA National Award, Dulux Colour Awards, 1996
