= Southbank Theatre =

Performing arts venue in Melbourne, Australia

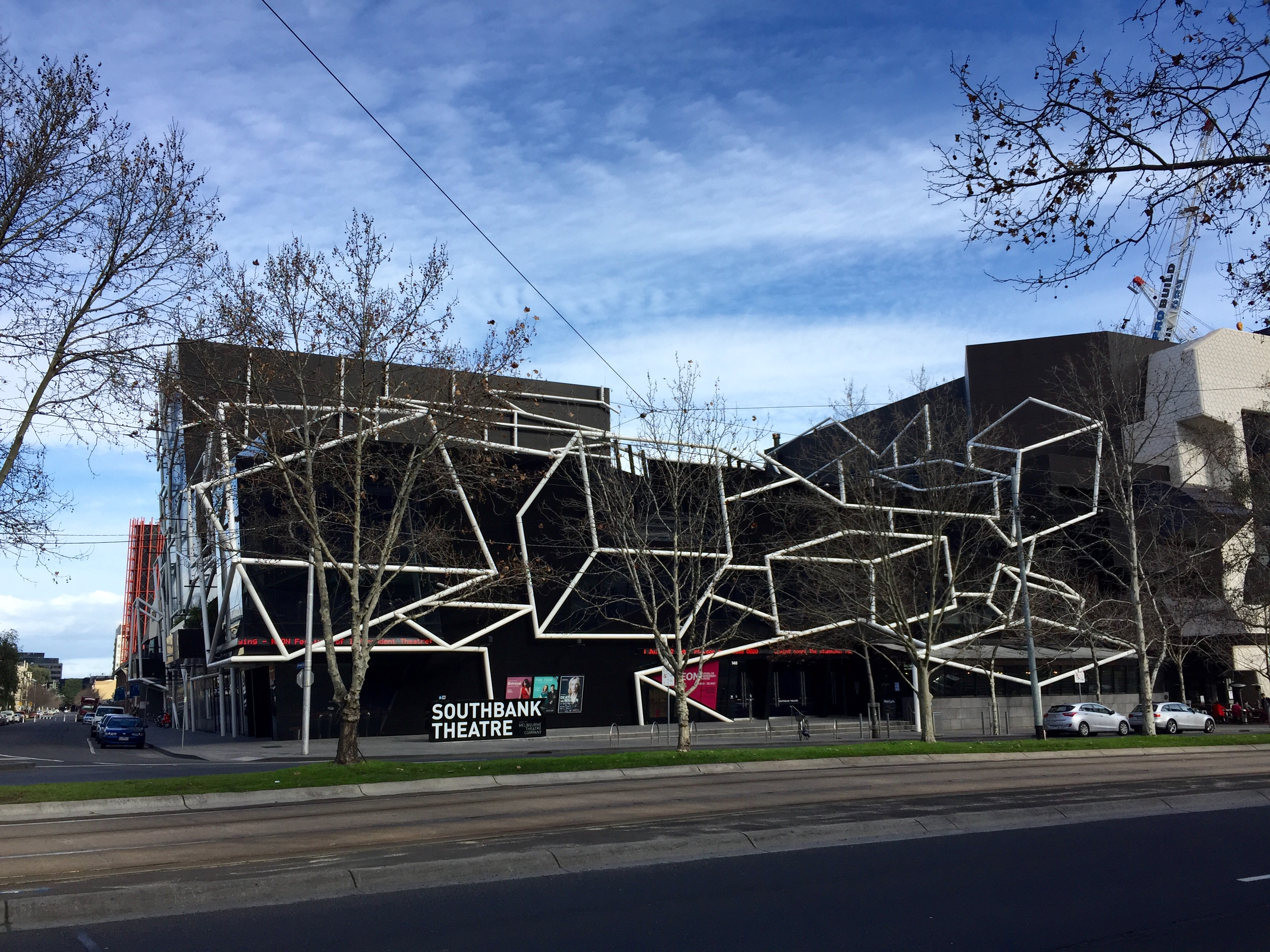
- Interactive map of Southbank Theatre
- Former names: MTC Theatre
- Address: 140 Southbank Boulevard; Southbank
- Coordinates: 37°49′26.6″S 144°58′5.8″E
- Operator: Melbourne Theatre Company
- Type: Theatre

Construction
- Opened: 27 January 2009
- Cost: AUD $55 million
- Architect: ARM Architecture
- General contractor: Bovis Lend Lease

Southbank Theatre is a performing arts venue located in the Southbank region of Melbourne, Victoria. It is the principal home of the Melbourne Theatre Company. The theatre was designed by ARM Architecture (Ashton Raggatt McDougall), and opened in January 2009 with a production of Poor Boy starring Guy Pearce. The building was awarded the 2009 Victorian Architecture Medal, the highest award in the state.

The theatre is adjacent to the Melbourne Recital Centre venue on Southbank Boulevard, with the two buildings constructed simultaneously. The distinctive geometric shapes on the theatre's facade were inspired by the paintings of the American abstract expressionist artist Al Held.

The theatre contains two performance spaces: the 559-seat "Sumner", and the smaller "Lawler" with 150 seats. These were named after director John Sumner and playwright Ray Lawler respectively. The theatre is also home to Script Bar & Bistro, function rooms and foyers and two foyer bars.
