= Richard Goldner =

- Born: 23 June 1908; Craiova, Romania
- Died: 27 September 1991 (aged 83); Balmain, Australia
- Occupations: Violist; Music pedagogue; Inventor
- Organizations: Musica Viva

Richard Goldner (23 June 1908 – 27 September 1991) was a Romanian-born, Viennese-trained Australian violist, pedagogue and inventor. He founded Musica Viva in 1945, which became the world's largest entrepreneurial chamber music organisation. The Goldner String Quartet was named in his memory.

== Biography ==
Goldner was born in Craiova in 1908. His father, Avram Beer Goldner, was a delicatessen owner, and his mother was Bertha (née Sachter). He grew up with an older brother, Gerard. His family moved to Vienna when he was six months old. He took up the violin at the age of four or five. After leaving school, Goldner studied architecture at Vienna Technical University from 1925, but also enrolled at the New Vienna Conservatory (1927–30), where he studied under Simon Pullman. He later received another diploma from the Academy of Music. He received instruction at master classes from Bronisław Huberman and other violinists. He played the viola in the Simon Pullman Ensemble from 1931 to 1938, and became Pullman's assistant and closest friend. (Pullman was later to die in a Nazi extermination camp.)

Goldner and his wife, Marianne née Reiss, with his brother and sister-in-law, escaped the Nazi oppression of Jews in Austria and arrived in Australia on the Orama in March 1939, six months before the start of World War II. There, although designated an enemy alien he soon became involved in musical life in his new country. He founded the Monomeeth String Quartet, basing its name on an indigenous word for peace and harmony.

However, because the Australian Musicians Union's restrictions on employing foreigners meant Goldner could not take up an offer of a position with an Australian Broadcasting Commission orchestra, he had to find other ways of making a living. He worked as a jeweller with Gerard. They invented a new style of zipper that was resistant to sand and would not break under war-time conditions, and which was vitally needed for use in the manufacture of parachutes. For this, he was attached to the Army Inventions Directorate and the Royal Australian Air Force. This invention made him a lot of money, and was acknowledged in the official history of Australia's war effort. In 2011, the Oscar-winning former film maker Suzanne Baker published Beethoven and the Zipper: The Astonishing Story of Musica Viva.

During the war, the then Minister for Immigration, Harold Holt, was personally very helpful in arranging passage for Richard Goldner's parents to Australia.

== Musica Viva ==
In 1945 he founded "Richard Goldner's Sydney Musica Viva", whose first concert was held at the New South Wales Conservatorium of Music in Sydney on 8 December 1945, to an audience of over 1,000 people. The first item they played was Beethoven's Grosse Fuge, Op. 133, in honour of his teacher Simon Pullman. (Pullman's makeshift chamber ensemble had been playing the Grosse Fuge in the Warsaw Ghetto in August 1942 when they were rounded up and sent to Treblinka, only one of them surviving.) During Goldner's concert there was a power blackout, and car headlights, an Army generator and hurricane lamps were used for illumination. The success of the concert inspired Goldner to form an organisation for the promotion of chamber music in all its forms. In this he was supported by Hephzibah Menuhin (then married to an Australian and living in Victoria) and assisted by a fellow refugee named Walter Dullo, a German lawyer-turned-chocolate maker and musicologist. Together, Goldner and Dullo found 17 musicians (mostly also southern or central European refugees, and mostly Jewish) and formed them into four separate chamber groups under the name Musica Viva. The initial funding for the organisation came from Goldner himself, from the proceeds of the manufacture of his zipper. They developed a punishing playing schedule throughout Australia and New Zealand, giving 170 concerts and travelling 50,000 miles a year. Although they were always financially successful, this schedule became exhausting. This, plus the fact that Goldner had injured the first finger of his left hand while making another invention, led to Goldner retiring from playing in 1952, and the group was disbanded, but it reformed in 1954.

== Later life ==
Goldner had always wanted to teach violin and viola, and to conduct young people's orchestras. In the early 1950s, Eugene Goossens, the Director of the NSW Conservatorium, approached him about teaching there, but he was far too busy with Musica Viva's playing schedule at that time. He was again approached in the early 1960s, this time by the new Director, Sir Bernard Heinze, and he was now in a position to accept a teaching position. He lectured in violin and viola.

In 1966 he moved to the United States with his former pupil Charmian Gadd. They taught at Pittsburgh and Washington (state). They married in 1970, when he was 62, and returned to Australia in 1981. Richard Goldner collected one of the most extensive chamber music libraries in Australia, which he donated to the NSW Conservatorium.

He died in Balmain, Sydney on 27 September 1991, aged 83.

== Honours ==
In June 1992, less than nine months after his death, a street in the Canberra suburb of Melba was named Goldner Circuit.

The Richard Goldner Award was founded by the Balmain Sinfonia in 1993, and goes to the winner of a biennial concerto competition for the player of an orchestral string instrument. Charmian Gadd is the patron of the competition.

== Goldner String Quartet ==
The Goldner String Quartet was formed in honour of Richard Goldner in 1995, and consists of Dene Olding and Dimity Hall (violins), Irina Morozova (viola; an ex-pupil of Goldner) and Julian Smiles (cello).

== Bibliography ==
- Suzanne Baker, Beethoven and the Zipper: The Astonishing Story of Musica Viva, 2011 ISBN 978-0-646-54017-7
