= ARM Architecture (company) =

Australian architectural firm

Practice information
- Partners: Howard Raggatt; Jesse Judd; Andrew Lilleyman; Mark Raggatt; Andrew Hayne
- Founders: Stephen Ashton; Howard Raggatt; Ian McDougall
- Founded: 1988
- Location: Melbourne, Sydney, Perth, Gold Coast and Adelaide, Australia

Significant works and honors
- Buildings: Storey Hall; National Museum of Australia; Shrine of Remembrance Redevelopment; Melbourne Recital Centre
- Projects: Adelaide Festival Plaza Precinct; Elizabeth Quay

Website
- www.armarchitecture.com.au

ARM Architecture or Ashton Raggatt McDougall is an architectural firm with offices in Melbourne, Sydney, and Adelaide, Australia. The firm was founded in Melbourne in 1988 by Stephen Ashton, Howard Raggatt, and Ian McDougall.

Notable projects include the National Museum of Australia in Canberra, the Melbourne Recital Centre and Southbank Theatre in Melbourne, Perth Arena and the Marion Cultural Centre in Adelaide.

== Architectural style ==
ARM has been described as practising "architectural outspokenness". The firm has undertaken a number of heritage and renewal projects, including the refurbishment of Hamer Hall at Arts Centre Melbourne, the redevelopment of the Shrine of Remembrance in Melbourne, RMIT Storey Hall, and the redevelopment of Melbourne Central Shopping Centre. ARM was also commissioned to prepare the masterplans for Melbourne Docklands, the Adelaide Festival Plaza Precinct, and Elizabeth Quay in Perth. Other projects include the Perth Arena and Wanangkura Stadium in Port Hedland.

As of 2016, ARM was the only Australian firm to have won the Australian Institute of Architects' Premier State Award seven times, most recently for the Geelong Library and Heritage Centre. The firm's design work has been featured on two Australian postage stamps.

== Notable projects ==
Completed	Project name	Location	Award	Notes
1994	St Kilda Library	Melbourne	Commendation for Institutional Alterations and Extensions, 1995; Commendation for Interior Architecture, 1995	
1995	RMIT Storey Hall	Melbourne	Interior Architecture Award, 1996; National Interior Architecture Award, 1996; Victorian Architecture Medal, 1996; William Wardell Award for Institutional Architecture, 1996; Marion Mahony Griffin Award for Interior Architecture, 1996; Dulux Colour Awards, National Award, 1996	
2000	National Museum of Australia	Canberra	Award of Merit, 2002 (ACT); Colorbond Award, 2002 (ACT)	
2001	Marion Cultural Centre	Adelaide	Award of Merit, 2003 (SA)	
2004	Shrine of Remembrance Visitor Centre and Gardens	Melbourne	Victorian Architecture Medal, 2004; Walter Burley Griffin Award for Urban Design, 2004; Melbourne Prize, 2004; William Wardell Award for Public Architecture, 2004; John George Knight Award (Heritage Architecture), 2004	
2006	Melbourne Central Shopping Centre	Melbourne	Walter Burley Griffin Award for Urban Design, 2006; Melbourne Prize, 2006	
2007	Albury Library Museum	Albury	Public Architecture Award, 2008	
2008	Melbourne Recital Centre and MTC Theatre Project, (Southbank Theatre)	Melbourne	Victorian Architecture Medal, 2009; Marion Mahony Award for Interior Architecture, 2009; Joseph Reed Award for Urban Design, 2009; William Wardell Award for Public Architecture, 2009	
2012	Hamer Hall	Melbourne	National Award for Interior Architecture, 2013; Lachlan Macquarie Award for Heritage, 2013; Melbourne Prize, 2013	
2012	Perth Arena	Perth	Sir Zelman Cowen Award for Public Architecture, 2013; Emil Sodersten Award for Interior Architecture, 2013 (National); Jeffrey Howlett Award for Public Architecture, 2013 (WA); George Temple Poole Award, 2013 (WA); Colorbond Steel Award, 2013 (WA)	
2012	Wanangkura Stadium	Port Hedland		
2013	Administration building, National Museum of Australia	Canberra		
2013–present	Home of the Arts	Surfers Paradise		
2015	Shrine of Remembrance Galleries of Remembrance	Melbourne	Sir Zelman Cowen Award for Public Architecture, 2015; Victorian Architecture Medal, 2015; Melbourne Prize, 2015; William Wardell Award for Public Architecture, 2015; John George Knight Award (Heritage Architecture), 2015; Urban Design Architecture Award, 2015	
2016	Geelong Library and Heritage Centre	Geelong	Sir Zelman Cowen Award for Public Architecture, 2016; Victorian Architecture Medal, 2016; William Wardell Award for Public Architecture, 2016; Marion Mahony Award for Interior Architecture, 2016; Regional Prize, 2016	
2020—2022	Sydney Opera House Renewal	Sydney, Australia	NSW Architecture Medallion, 2023; Lachlan Macquarie Award for Heritage Architecture, 2023; Emil Sodersten Award for Interior Architecture, 2023; John Verge Award for Interior Architecture, 2023 (NSW); Greenway Award for Heritage, 2023 (NSW)	
2023	Geelong Arts Centre (Stage 3)	Geelong		
2023	Blacktown Exercise and Sports Technology Hub (BEST)	Rooty Hill		

== Gallery ==
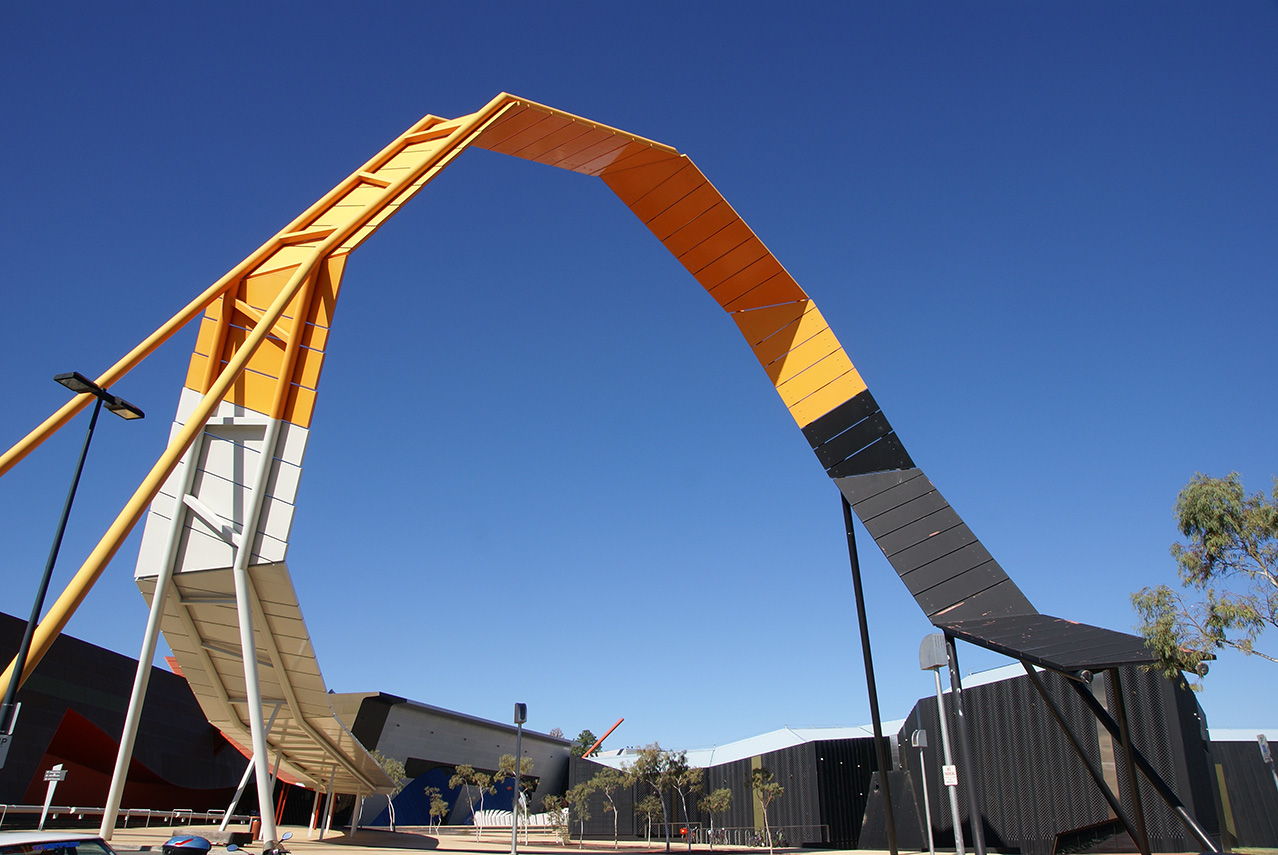
National Museum of Australia (2000)

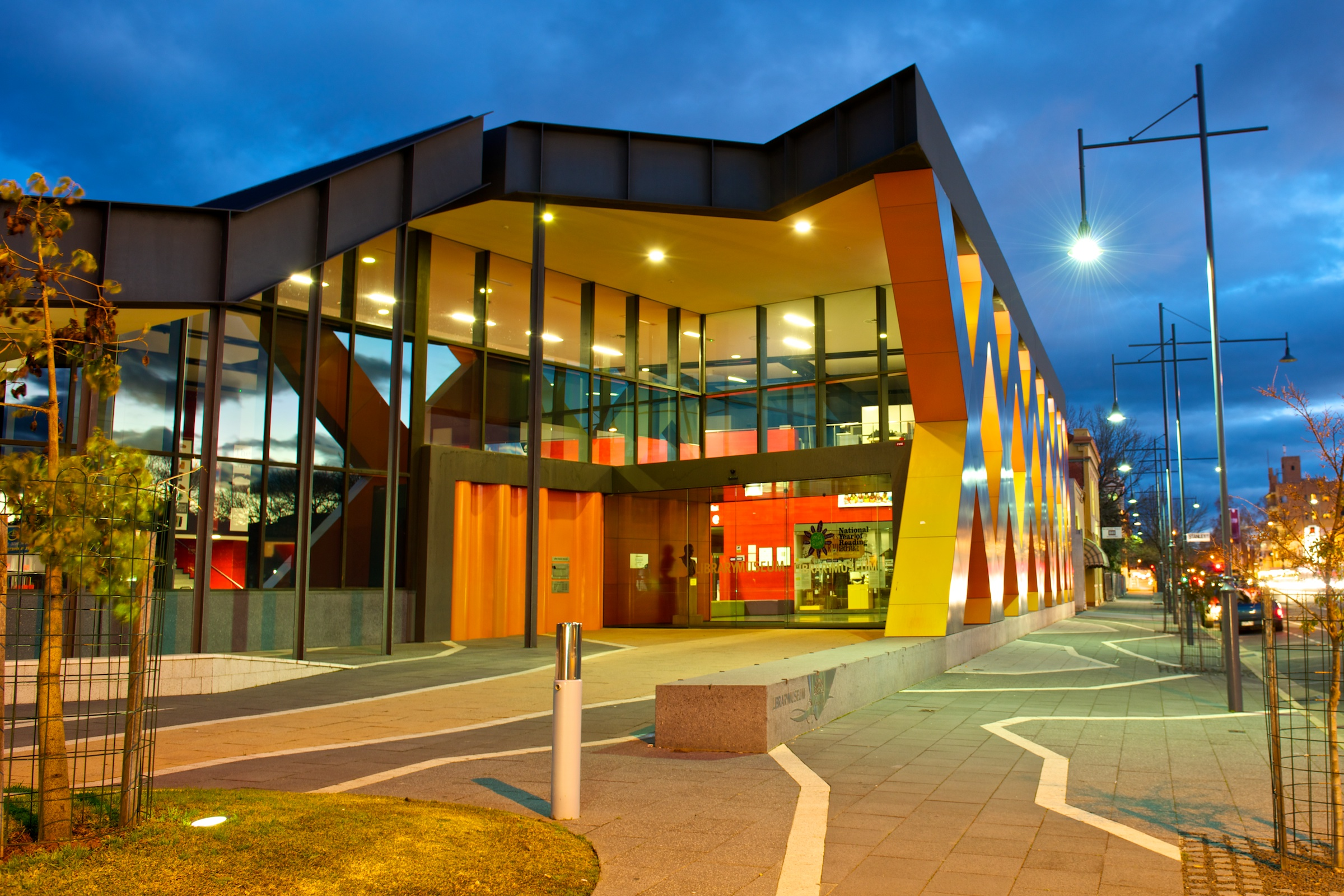
Albury Library Museum (2007)

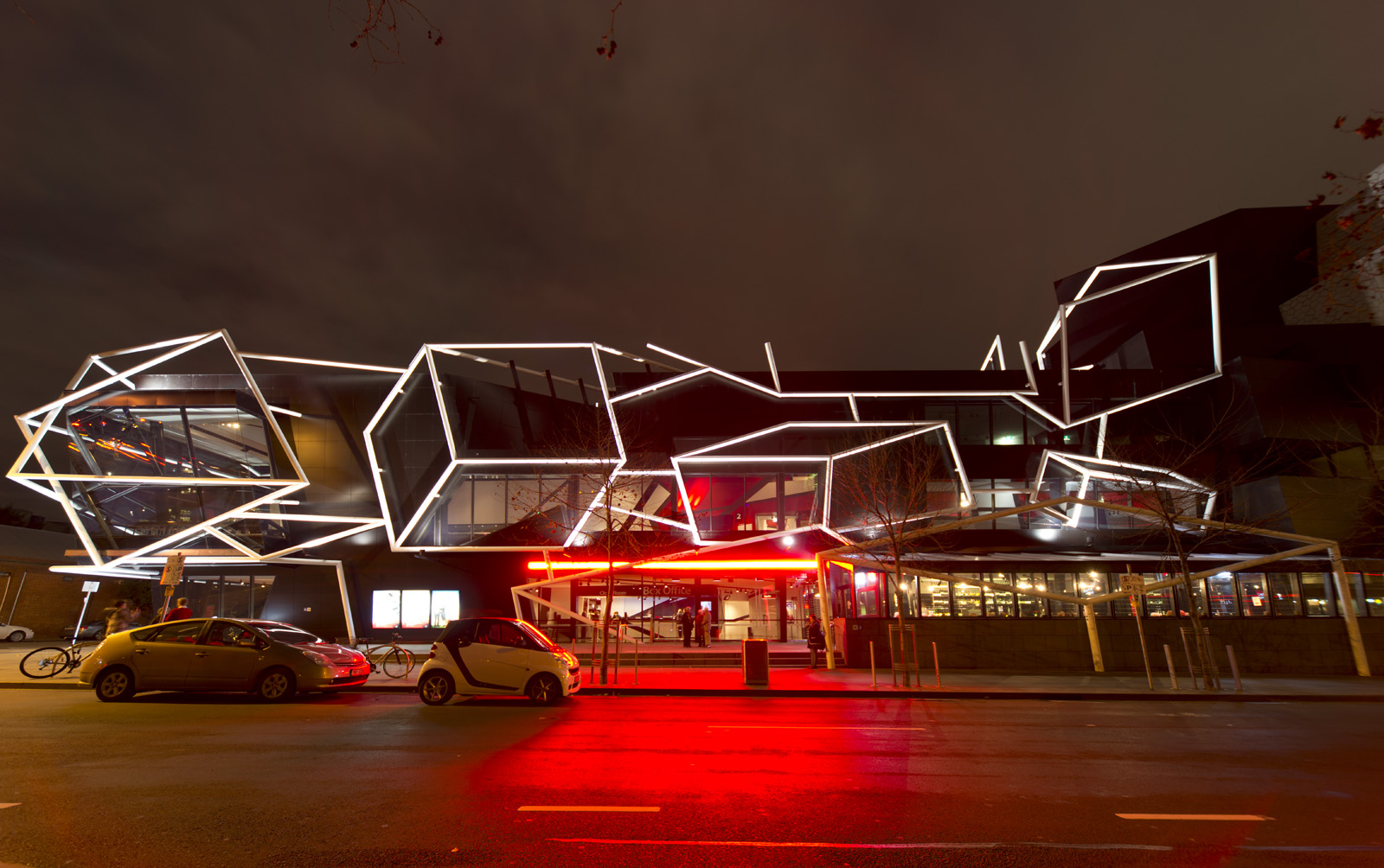
Southbank Theatre (2008)

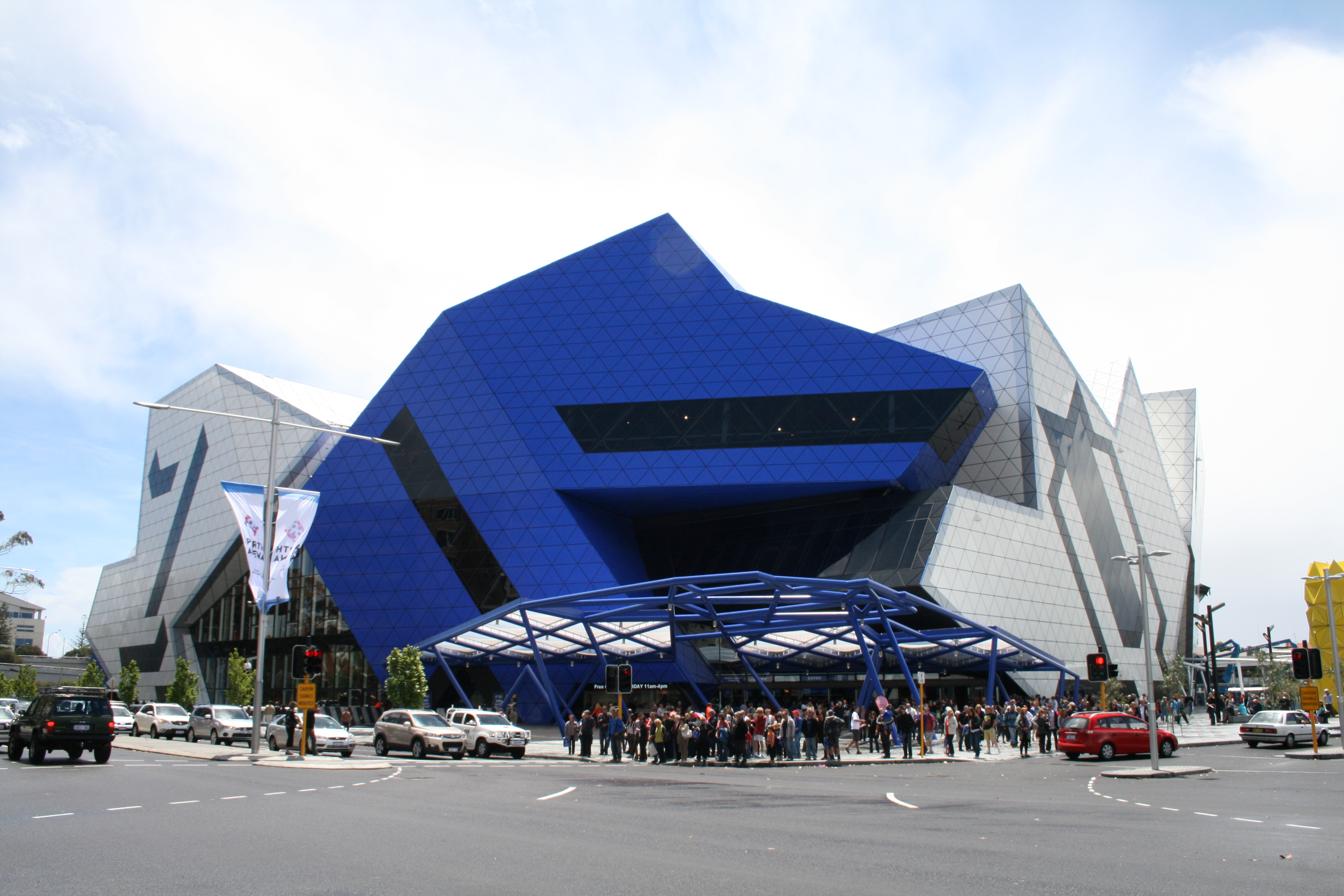
Perth Arena (2012)

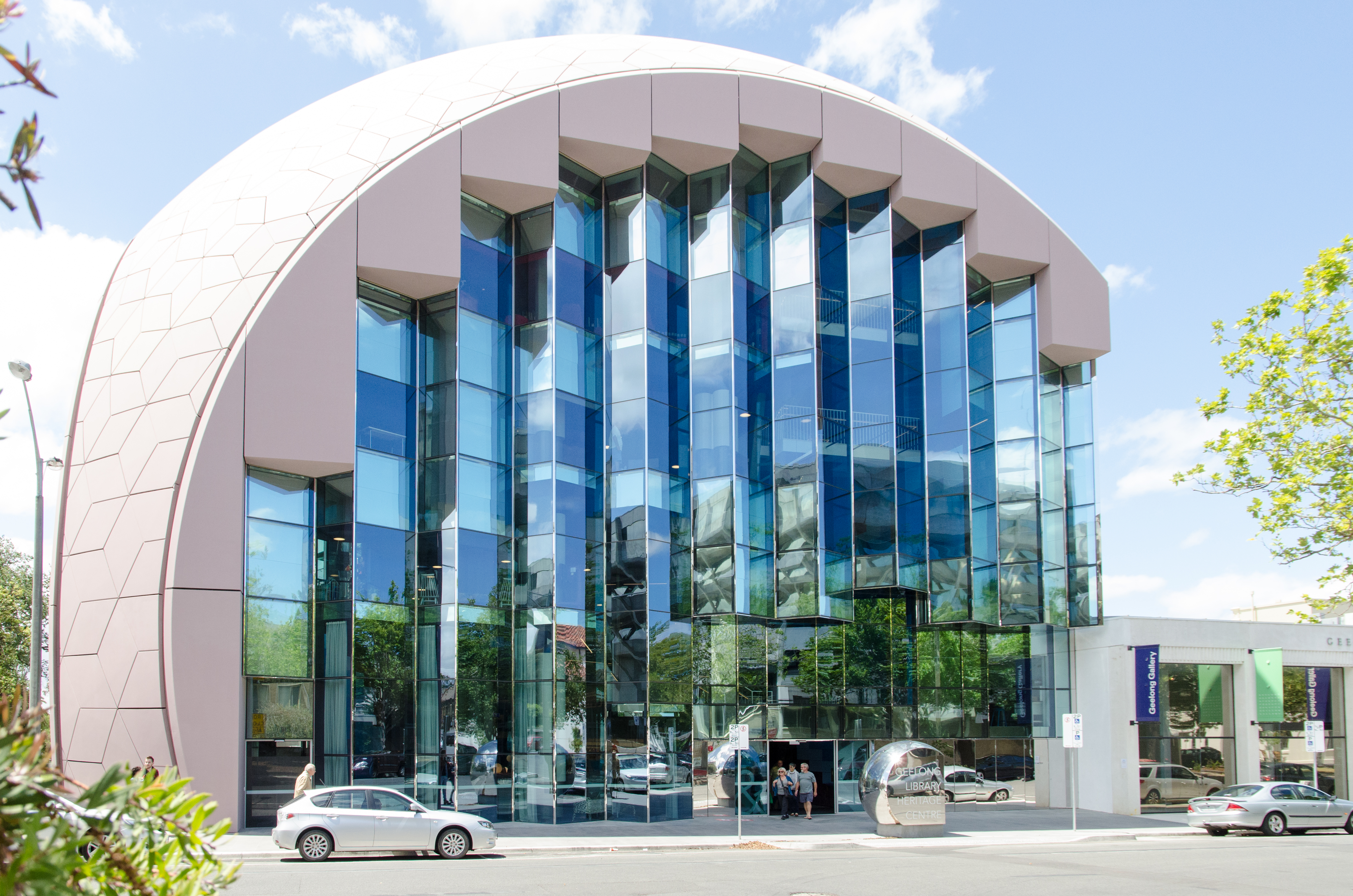
Geelong Library and Heritage Centre (2015)

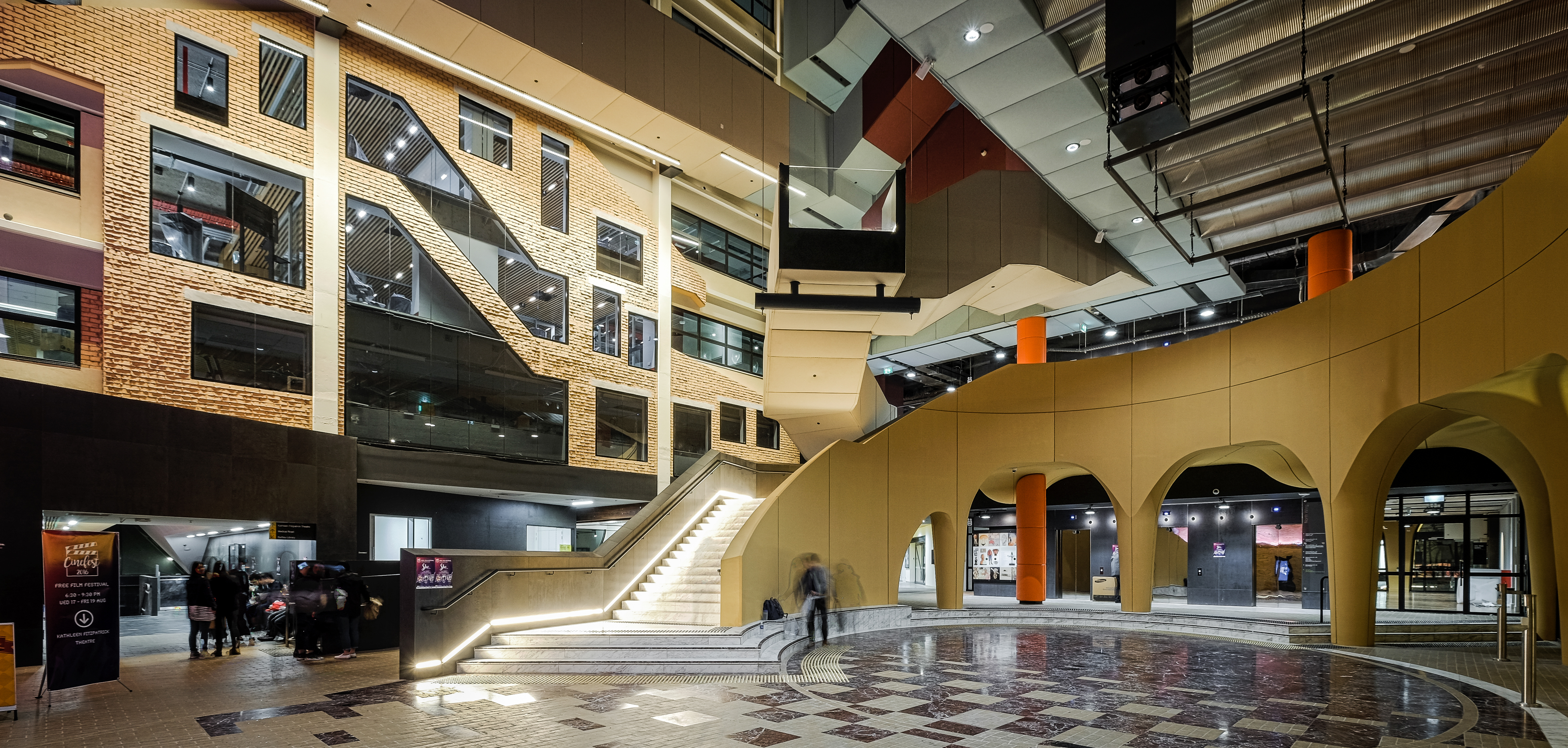
Arts West Building (2017) University of Melbourne

== See also ==
- Architecture of Australia
