= Marion Cultural Centre =

Building in Adelaide, South Australia

- Interactive map of the Marion Cultural Centre area

General information
- Type: Cultural centre
- Architectural style: Modernism
- Location: Oaklands Park, City of Marion, Australia
- Coordinates: 35.0135°S 138.5435°E
- Completed: November 2001
- Cost: $8.5m (A$)
- Client: Marion City Council

Technical details
- Floor area: 2,500 m^{2} (27,000 sq ft)

Design and construction
- Architects: Ashton Raggatt McDougall and Phillips Pilkington Architects in Association

Marion Cultural Centre is located in the City of Marion, a local government area and suburb in Adelaide, South Australia, Australia.

== History ==
The Marion Cultural Centre is situated in the suburb of Marion, in the city of Adelaide, South Australia. The building, designed by Melbourne architects Ashton Raggat McDougall (ARM) in collaboration with the Adelaide studio of Phillips/Pilkington Architects (PP), was inaugurated on 23 November 2001. The Marion City Council provided the funding for the cultural centre with the aim of establishing a venue for cultural events and gatherings. The building comprises several facilities, including a library, an information centre, an art gallery, a multipurpose space, a café, a workshop space, a multipurpose performance hall, and a plaza.

== Architecture ==
=== Themes ===
The postmodern building is meant to emphasise the importance of a creative agenda for Marion's future sustainability. ARM Architecture has aimed to give the cultural centre a connecting theme for residents and visitors by incorporating the word "Marion" into the façade and external features of the building.

The entry, midway along the arcade, leads to an "open circulation space" that is partially filled with a café and has wide steps leading up to the library. The building contains a library, a gallery, and an auditorium. The auditorium has no windows and is clad internally with plywood panels. These stained panels feature many small holes in their groupings. A more direct symbol is used on the ceiling, with two pixelated hands.

=== Design approach and key influences ===
Site Context: Marion Cultural Centre

Facade Sketch of the Marion Cultural Centre

=== The Plaza ===
The two main elements of the plaza are the undulating lawn and the band of paving slate that intersects the area, interpreting a creek bed pattern flowing from hills to sea. Landscaping themes are also intended to be simple and contemporary, incorporating tree species that aim to reflect the pioneer agricultural settlement of the Marion district as well as reflect the site's earlier role as the site of Warracowie House. Spotted gums are present and intended to blend with surrounding elements - particularly, the locally identifiable red and lemon-scented gums that dot the Westfield precinct. Outer landscape elements are stone or slate seating and retaining walls. Garden areas are simple, low-maintenance, and water-efficient, with provisions for seating and relaxation.

=== Strip shops ===
The plan and layout of the architecture and programs emulate the tradition of strip shops. This model of layout has been the main retail typology in Australian cities, rather than the big industrial shopping complexes. The supposed reasoning is that it encourages outdoor usage, with the plaza as the primary circulation. The shop, gallery, and café are all accessible from outside.

=== Sustainability ===
The sustainable design of the Marion Cultural Centre incorporates a storm water retention system that allows surface run-off to be stored, filtered on site, and then pumped into the ground to replenish the aquifer under Adelaide. It is also used for greywater in the building itself. The centre also features a solar hot water system, water-efficient fixtures and fittings, energy-efficient artificial lighting, low-energy evaporative systems, and economy-cycle air conditioning. The external landscaping is designed to be low-maintenance and water-efficient. The centre uses a building management system that includes night purging, C-Bus lighting control combined with sensor activation, low emissivity glass on the eastern façade, and a gas-boosted solar hot water system. The architects were linked with the project managers, sub-consultants, and Marion Council by an Internet-based project management system to ensure tight and responsive management during the construction process. Considerable community consultation also went into the building's design to appeal to residents of Marion and aims to reflect its cultural identity.

== Program ==
=== The Library ===
The library is located on the eastern side of the building and is intended to be the 'information hub' of the centre. The eastern façade is glazed and screened to let high levels of natural light in; the eastern veranda also provides a certain amount of shading.

=== The Domain Theatre ===
The Domain Theatre is the centre's 'performing art' focus. The floor can be arranged into different configurations, which can provide seating ranging from 80 to approximately 250 people. Along with having a versatile seating area, this area incorporates a raised, movable stage for theatrical and musical performances. The floor area is the same as the old Pioneer Hall, the facility it replaces. Internal finishes of sprung timber over a concrete slab and acoustic wall panelling mean this multi-purpose facility provides a venue for a wide range of 'performance-based' activities. Subsidiary spaces, including a backstage area, rehearsal space, storage area, and box office, mean the Domain Theatre can host a diverse range of activities, including performing arts, functions, meetings, seminars, concerts, and conferences.

=== Gallery M ===
Located on the western side of the centre, Gallery M has been designed as an arts facility, and includes a gallery shop, and a storage area for artworks. The gallery has 66 m (217 ft) of hanging space. The gallery and shop are managed by the Red House Group (RHG), which is a group of artists governed by a board, on behalf of the City of Marion. The gallery mounts around 17 and 20 exhibitions per year of work by both established and emerging artists. Ann-Marie Green has been manager of the gallery since 2021. Green grew up in Adelaide, but had lived in Sydney for 25 years before completing a Master of Museum and Curatorial Studies at the University of Adelaide.

In March 2025, Gallery M was able to benefit from the "Sharing the National Collection" initiative of the National Gallery of Australia, which enabled some of its stored artworks to be exhibited in regional galleries. Green had learnt of the initiative at a conference in 2023, and after a long consultation and approval process, a number of works curated by Green arrived at the gallery for exhibition. The loaned art works stay on display until March 2027, alongside other exhibitions already planned for the gallery.

=== Meeting rooms ===
The cultural centre has three main meeting rooms, all of varying sizes and for different needs. Meeting Room 1 can accommodate 30 people and provides an ideal venue for small-scale presentations, lectures, and launches. Rooms two and three are designed for smaller numbers that would suit planning meetings while at the same time doubling as changing rooms for Domain Theatre performers and players.

=== Foyer and café ===
The foyer is flexible and split-level. Located in the foyer are the café and an open space with the hubs of the centre's three other functional zones. These zones then link to the outside plaza space.

With a floor area of approximately 200m², the foyer operates simply as a main lobby, a display space, and a performance area, with the steps providing an informal amphitheatre or a café area with partial or full exposure to The Plaza.

== 2013 upgrade ==
A competition was run by the Marion City Council on 10 November 2012, to upgrade and revitalize the Marion Cultural Centre Plaza. The winner was unanimously decided by a panel of specialists in separate fields, with ASPECT Studios in association with Roarkus Moss Architects and Groundplay winning.

The upgrades were to commence in early 2013, with the first stage to be completed by the end of 2013, but the plans have since been postponed until further notice.
