= Ludwik Holcman =

Polish violinist

- Born: 1889
- Died: August 1942 (aged 52–53); Treblinka, Poland
- Occupation: Concertmaster
- Instrument: Violin

Ludwik Holcman (1889 – August 1942) was a Jewish violinist from Poland who died at Treblinka during the Holocaust.

== Biography ==
Holcman was born in 1889.

By 1929, Holcman was already a violinist for the Warsaw Symphony Orchestra.

From 1937 to 1939, Holcman was serving as a concertmaster for the orchestra. In 1939, he had become a solo violinist for the orchestra and began working as a conductor as well.

Holcman became a violinist in the Warsaw Ghetto Symphony Orchestra that was led by Simon Pullman.

As he was Jewish, he was transported to Treblinka extermination camp with all the members of the orchestra early in August 1942, where they were killed.
