= Walter Dullo =

Walter Andreas Dullo (26 November 1902 – 22 August 1978) was a German musicologist and lawyer who migrated to Australia, where he became best known as a chocolate maker. He also continued his musical activities there, and was a co-founder of both Musica Viva Australia (with Richard Goldner) and FM radio station 2MBS.

== Career ==
Walter Dullo was born in Königsberg, East Prussia, Germany (now Kaliningrad, Russia). He studied mathematics at the Humboldt University of Berlin 1921-24, music at the University of Heidelberg 1925-28, and law back at Humboldt 1929-33. Being prevented by the Nazi government from practising law because his mother was Jewish, he learned the art of chocolate making. He married in Berlin in June 1937, and in September he and his wife travelled by ship to Australia.

In 1939 the Dullos opened a small shop in the Sydney suburb of Double Bay, where they sold their home-made chocolate truffles. He was classified as a refugee alien during World War II, and was sent to work at Alice Springs. He became a British subject in 1944. The chocolate business resumed after the war, and became well-known but always stayed at its modest home. Dullo retired in 1970. Dullo Fine Chocolates continues to this day, in a different location.

== Musical activities ==
In 1945, along with Richard Goldner, Dullo co-founded Musica Viva Australia, which had its first concert on 8 December 1945, and went on to become the world's largest chamber music organisation. The inaugural concert included Dullo's arrangement for string orchestra of Mozart's Fantasy No. 1 in F minor for Mechanical Organ.

He was also vice-president of the Sydney Mozart Society and correspondent of the Salzburg Mozarteum.

In the 1960s he reconstructed and completed five piano sonatas by Franz Schubert. These have been recorded by Romola Costantino and Geoffrey Saba. He also wrote cadenzas for Mozart piano concertos, and wrote program notes for the ABC, Musica Viva and the Mozart Society, and articles for music publications.

Along with Trevor Jarvie and others, Dullo founded Australia's first FM radio station, 2MBS (now called Fine Music 102.5), which began broadcasting on 15 December 1974. He helped devise programs, and lent the station many records from his extensive private collection.

In 1977 he was appointed to the Order of Merit of the Federal Republic of Germany.

Walter Andreas Dullo collapsed at the offices of 2MBS on 22 August 1978, and died at the Royal North Shore Hospital in Sydney, aged 75.
