= Albury Library Museum =

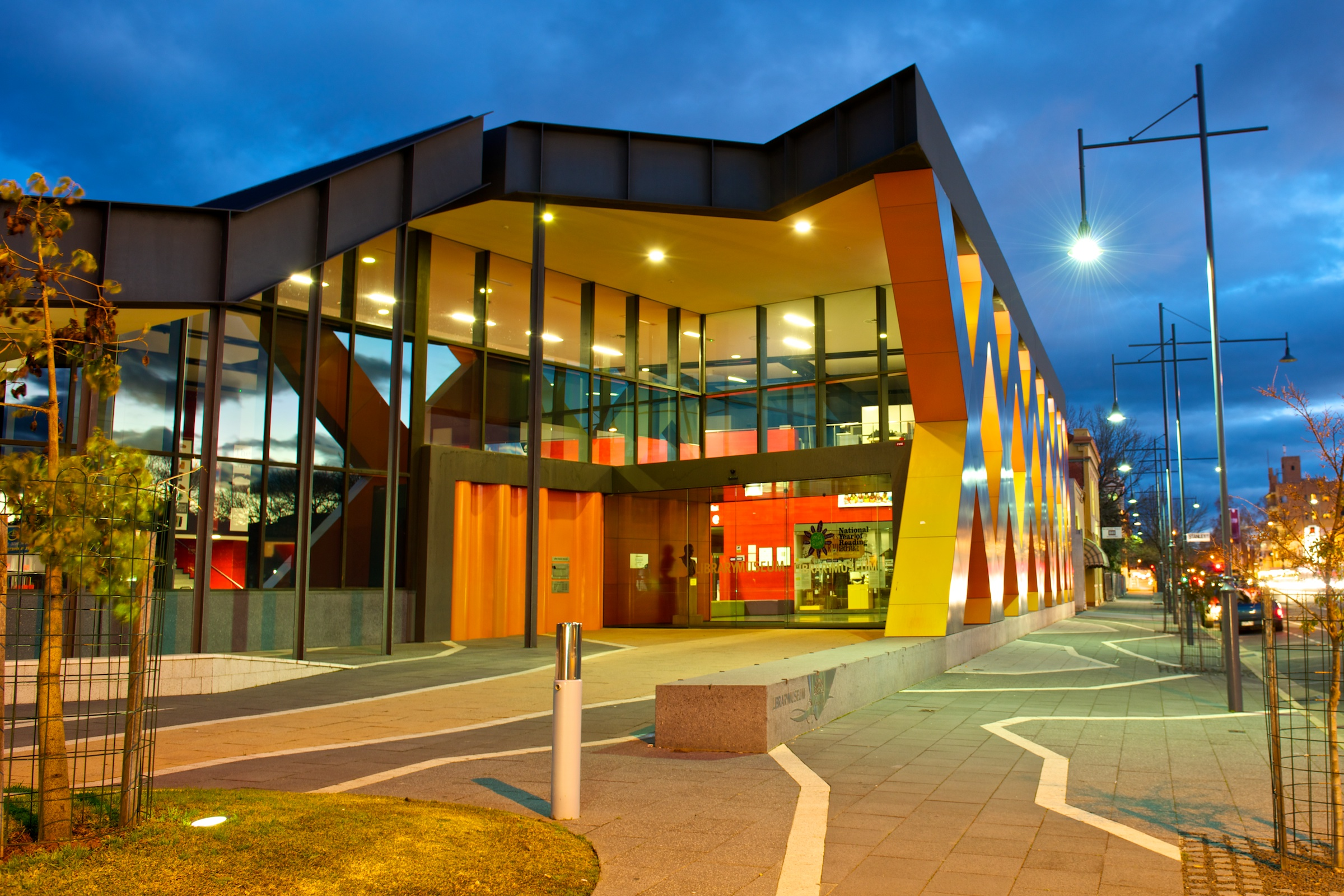
- Albury Library Museum by night
- 36°4′44″S 146°54′58″E
- Location: Albury, New South Wales, Australia
- Established: 2007
- Architect: Ashton Raggatt McDougall

Other information
- Website: www.alburycity.nsw.gov.au/leisure/museum-and-libraries/locations/librarymuseum

Albury Library Museum is a combined library and museum in Albury, New South Wales, Australia. Designed by Ashton Raggatt McDougall it was opened in 2007. The library has 50,000 books, magazines and electronic media items. The building received the Australian Institute of Architects's National Award for Public Architecture.

== Architecture ==
The library museum renders an architectural texture to the cityscape of Albury. The building is orange and grey with a criss-cross architecture said to have been motivated by the historic Murray River rail bridge.

The library has free access to computer and free wifi.

In the first year of its operation the building had 226,000 visitors, of which 80,000 entered the exhibition space.
