= Neues Wiener Konservatorium =

The Neues Wiener Konservatorium (New Vienna Conservatory) was a music school established in Vienna by Theobald Kretschmann in 1909. In 1929, it had the largest number of enrolled students during its lifetime.

Other names include Privatmusikschule Theobald Kretschmann and Neues Konservatorium für Musik.

Among its faculty were Richard Robert (briefly its director), Simon Pullman and Severin Eisenberger.
