= Hamer Hall, Melbourne =

Concert hall in Melbourne, Victoria, Australia

Hamer Hall
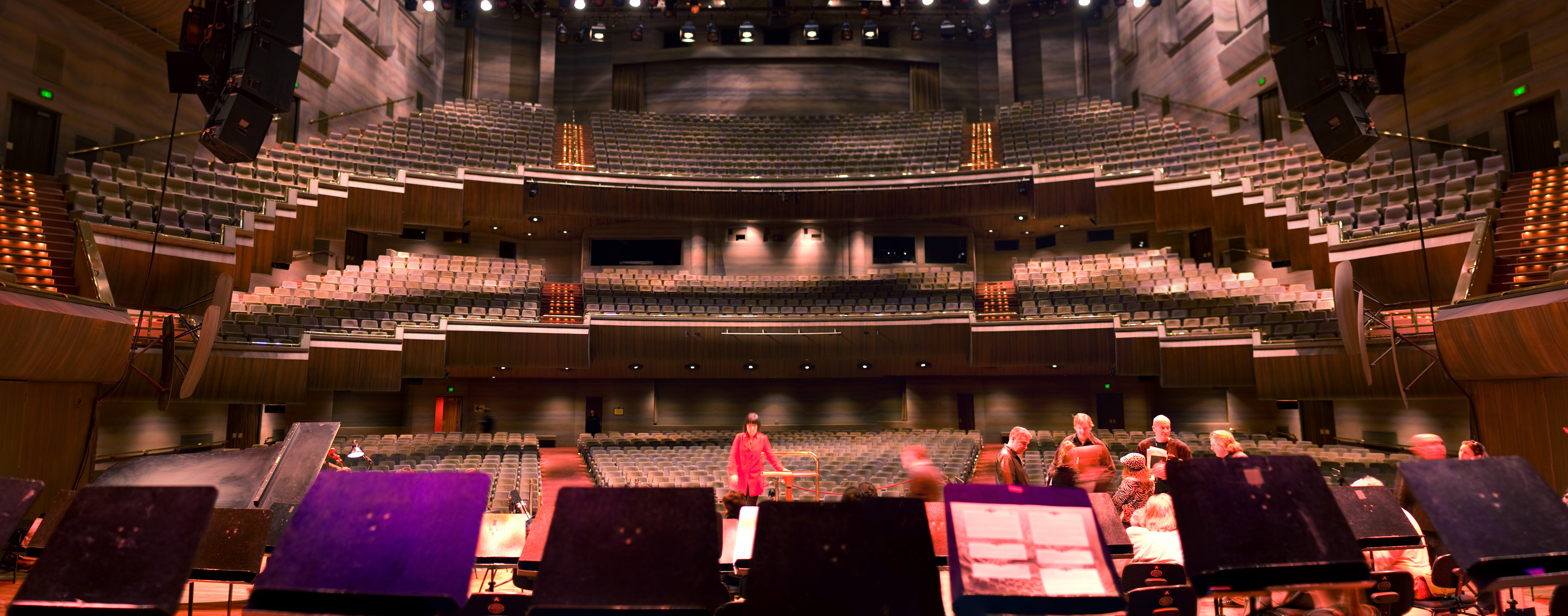
- Interior from back of the stage
- Interactive map of the Hamer Hall area
- Former names: Melbourne Concert Hall

General information
- Type: Concert hall
- Location: Southbank, Victoria, Australia
- Coordinates: 37°49′13″S 144°58′6″E
- Construction started: 1973; 53 years ago
- Completed: 1982; 44 years ago
- Owner: Victorian Arts Centre Trust

Design and construction
- Architects: Roy Grounds and Company
- Other designers: John Truscott
- Main contractor: Baulderstone

Other information
- Seating capacity: 2,466

Website
- Arts Centre Melbourne

Hamer Hall, formerly the Melbourne Concert Hall, is a concert hall in Melbourne, Australia. The 2,466-seat hall is the largest indoor venue at the Arts Centre Melbourne, and is mostly used for orchestral and contemporary music performances. It was designed by Roy Grounds as part of the cultural centre which comprised the National Gallery of Victoria and the Arts Centre Melbourne. It was opened as the Melbourne Concert Hall in 1982 (the theatres building opened in 1984) and was renamed Hamer Hall in honour of Sir Rupert Hamer (the 39th Premier of Victoria) shortly after his death in 2004.

== 2010 redevelopment ==
Construction on the A$136 million inside–out redevelopment of Hamer Hall was due to begin in 2010. The venue's redevelopment was the first stage of the Southbank Cultural Precinct Redevelopment and was delivered through an alliance between Arts Victoria, Major Projects Victoria, the Arts Centre, Ashton Raggatt McDougall and Baulderstone. The redevelopment included a new outlook to the city and new connections to central Melbourne, St Kilda Road and the Yarra River, new and expanded foyer spaces, improved amenities, new stairs, improved disability access, escalators and lifts as well as improved acoustics, new auditorium seating and staging systems.

The hall was reopened on 26 July 2012 with a Hamer Hall Opening Concert featuring Caroline O'Connor, k.d. lang, Eddie Perfect and Lior with a live orchestra. The project later won the AIA Melbourne Prize for the architects Ashton Raggatt McDougall for its overall contribution to the civic life of Melbourne.

== Awards and nominations ==
=== Music Victoria Awards ===
The Music Victoria Awards are an annual awards night celebrating Victorian music. They commenced in 2006. The award for Best Venue was introduced in 2016.

Year	Nominee / work	Award	Result	Ref.
Music Victoria Awards of 2018	Hamer Hall, Melbourne	Best Venue (Over 500 Capacity)	Nominated	
Music Victoria Awards of 2019	Hamer Hall, Melbourne	Best Venue (Over 500 Capacity)	Nominated	
Music Victoria Awards of 2020	Hamer Hall, Melbourne	Best Venue (Over 500 Capacity)	Nominated	
2021 Music Victoria Awards	Hamer Hall, Melbourne	Best Venue (Over 500 Capacity)	Nominated	

== See also ==
- Donald Laycock, Australian artist who painted the interior of Hamer Hall
- Melbourne Prize
