= Musica Viva =

Australian music organisation

- Formation: 1945; 81 years ago
- Founder: Richard Goldner; Walter Dullo
- Type: Chamber music organization
- Headquarters: Sydney, Australia
- Artistic director: Paul Kildea

Musica Viva, also known as Musica Viva Australia, is a national organisation in Australia dedicated to chamber music.

== History ==
Music Viva was founded in Sydney in 1945 by Romanian-born Vienna-educated violinist Richard Goldner, who had fled Nazi Germany in 1939. The co-founder was a German-born musicologist, Walter Dullo. At its inception, Richard Goldner's Sydney Musica Viva, as it was then called, was a string ensemble comprising 17 European immigrants, who were excluded from playing in Australian orchestra's by the Musicians' Union of Australia. Funded entirely by Goldner, the name was chosen in honour of Hermann Scherchen, conductor of an orchestra in Vienna named Musica Viva.

The first concert of Sydney Musica Viva was presented at Verbrugghen Hall, Sydney Conservatorium of Music, on 8 December 1945. Let down by Sydney's unreliable post-war power supply, the concert took place in darkness save the headlights of several cars parked in the doorway of the auditorium, and lighting provided by a generator in the foyers.

Richard Goldner's Sydney Musica Viva performed 10 concerts in 1946, and 20 in 1947. In 1948, the ensemble toured Melbourne, Adelaide, and New Zealand, and eventually reduced to just five players, including Goldner as violist. They were popular with recent European refugees as well as locals. However, the schedule was exhausting, Goldner's financial resources were drying up, and he was forced to give up playing after injuring his hand in 1952. Musica Viva paused their activities, but re-formed in 1953 or 1954 as a concert agency with the help of Fred Turnovsky and Paul Morawetz, named Musica Viva Society of Australia. Goldner took the role of music director, with the group being guided by Charles Berg and Ken Tribe.

Goldner continued as honorary music director until 1969, and Musica Viva eventually became the largest not-for-profit chamber music organisation in the world.

In 2011, the Academy Award-winning film producer Suzanne Baker published a book titled Beethoven and the Zipper: The Astonishing Story of Musica Viva, which detailed how Richard Goldner had invented and patented a zip fastener for the Australian Army, and used the proceeds to establish Musica Viva Australia.

== Governance and people ==
Since 2019 and as of November 2023 the artistic director is conductor and author Paul Kildea. He succeeded composer Carl Vine, who had been in the role for the previous 20 years.

As of November 2023 the CEO is Anne Frankenberg. She occupied the newly created role of deputy CEO in 2019.

Hywel Sims was appointed Victorian general manager in June 2016.

== Chamber music competitions ==
=== MICMC ===
Since 1991, when it was founded by Marco van Pagee, a lecturer at the Victorian College of the Arts, the Melbourne International Chamber Music Competition (MICMC) has been staged every four years.

In 2016, Musica Viva took over co-management of the Melbourne International Chamber Music Competition, together with MRC and the Australian National Academy of Music (ANAM). Wilma Smith, previously concertmaster of the Melbourne Symphony Orchestra, was appointed artistic director of the competitions, and works alongside the Victorian general manager.

In 2018, the Grand Prize of the MICMC was won by the Berlin-based piano trio, Trio Marvin,

As of 2023, MICMC prizes are, for string quartets:

- 1st Prize – Robert Salzer Foundation Prize - $30,000
- 2nd Prize – Patricia H. Reid Endowment Fund Prize - $20,000
- 3rd Prize – $10,000
- Audience Prize for String Quartet - $8,000
- Quartet Commission Prize – Rowland-Jones & Immelman Commission Performance Prize - $4,000

and for piano trio:

- 1st Prize – Tony Berg Prize - $22,500
- 2nd Prize – In Memory of Paul Morawetz - $15,000
- 3rd Prize – Musica Viva Australia Victorian Committee Prize - $7,500
- Audience Prize for Piano Trio - $6,000
- Trio Commission Prize – Barry Jones Commission Performance Prize - $3,000

=== APCMC ===
The forerunner to the Asia-Pacific Chamber Music Competition (APCMC) was the Australian National Chamber Music Competition, first held in 1997 and held every four years alternately with MICMC. In 2001, the Seraphim Trio, an Australian trio co-founded by pianist Anna Goldsworthy, won the trio and audience choice prizes in the competition.

In 2009, the MICMC was complemented by the Asia-Pacific Chamber Music Competition, with each held at the newly opened Melbourne Recital Centre (MRC) alternately on a four-year cycle. Young chamber music ensembles from around the world compete in both competitions. The expansion was initiated under Chamber Music Australia's artistic director Marco van Pagee. APCMC is open to "the best young [aged under 35] piano trios and string quartets from the region". Prizes are in cash as well as including concert engagements. In its inaugural year, Anna Goldworthy, Tokyo String Quartet member Koichiro Harada, and Scottish cellist Alasdair Tait were on the panel of six jurors.

In 2013, APCMC was presented by Chamber Music Australia in association with the MRC. Murdoch University, Arts Victoria, Musica Viva, and ABC Classic FM were all partners, and Dame Elisabeth Murdoch was patron.

=== Strike A Chord ===
In 2020, the "Strike A Chord" competition was established, a national chamber music competition for Australian school students. In addition to prizes, the winners are given opportunities for development with Monash University, the Flinders Quartet, and the Sutherland Trio. The finalists' concert is broadcast by the ABC. The third edition was held in 2022.

== Programs and events ==
=== Past ===
==== Rising Stars (2012) ====
In 2012, Musica Viva ran a program called Rising Stars – an initiative that provides purposeful performance-based and practical training opportunities for three emerging Australian chamber ensembles each year. The Rising Stars of 2012 were the Enigma Quartet, Sydney Camerata Quartet, and Streeton Trio.

=== Ongoing ===
==== Musica Viva in Schools ====
Musica Viva runs a large music education program across Australia called Musica Viva in Schools. Talented and experienced musicians travel to all states and territories, including regional and remote areas, "to perform interactive, musically, and culturally diverse performances". The program includes teacher development and online resources.

In 2014, The Guardian named Musica Viva in Schools' Interactive Whiteboard as one of the ten global R&D projects that were changing arts and culture.

In 2016 Musica Viva announced the inaugural artistic director of education, Michael Sollis.

==== FutureMakers ====
In 2015, a program called FutureMakers was launched. This is a two-year program in which young musicians participate in intensive sessions with leading artists, directors, and consultants from a range of industries and sectors. As of 2015 Genevieve Lacey was artistic director of Musica Viva's FutureMakers program.
