= Prospect Hill Reservoir =

- Tower in image is pale-grey on the left.

- Location within Sydney Location within Australia
- 33°49′17″S 150°54′55″E
- Location: East of Prospect Reservoir, Prospect, City of Blacktown, New South Wales, Australia

History
- Built: 1934

Site notes
- Elevation: 116 metres (381 feet) ASL
- Architect: The Metropolitan Board of Water Supply and Sewerage
- Architectural style: Egyptian Revival architecture
- Owner: Sydney Water; Water NSW

New South Wales Heritage Register
- Official name: Prospect Hill Reservoir (Elevated)
- Type: State heritage
- Designated: 14 August 2000

Prospect Hill Reservoir, also known as Prospect water tower or water tower hill, is a heritage-listed water tower situated in the western suburbs of Sydney, New South Wales, Australia. Built in 1934, the tower is one of the few concrete elevated reservoirs in Sydney, which features Egyptian-style doorways and serves the proximate suburban communities.

== History ==
The water tower as seen from Reconciliation Road.

A reservoir was built in 1915 near its site, but was then deconstructed in 1936. In 1957, another tower was built just right next to it, which is darker grey in colour and slightly taller. In the 1960s/1970s, a roof was installed on the water tower to support higher water quality. It was listed in August 2000 in the New South Wales Heritage Database.

== Design ==
The tower is physically similar to Dural Reservoir (1938) and Berowra Reservoir (1939), all have stepped or tapered sides and doorways at the bottom and top with Egyptian inspired door-frames. The platform above of tower for the staircase, which leads to the top of the reservoir, has a steel frame. Features of the tower include davit, handrails and inlet and outlet valve chambers. The tower is supplied by pumping water from the main Prospect Reservoir.

== Geography ==
The tower is situated within the Prospect Nature Reserve in Reservoir Road, just east of Prospect Reservoir, although it is inaccessible for the public. Surrounded by Australian bushland, it is one of the highest points of Prospect Hill and can be observed from Prospect Highway and other areas nearby, due to its steep, prominently elevated, edged location.

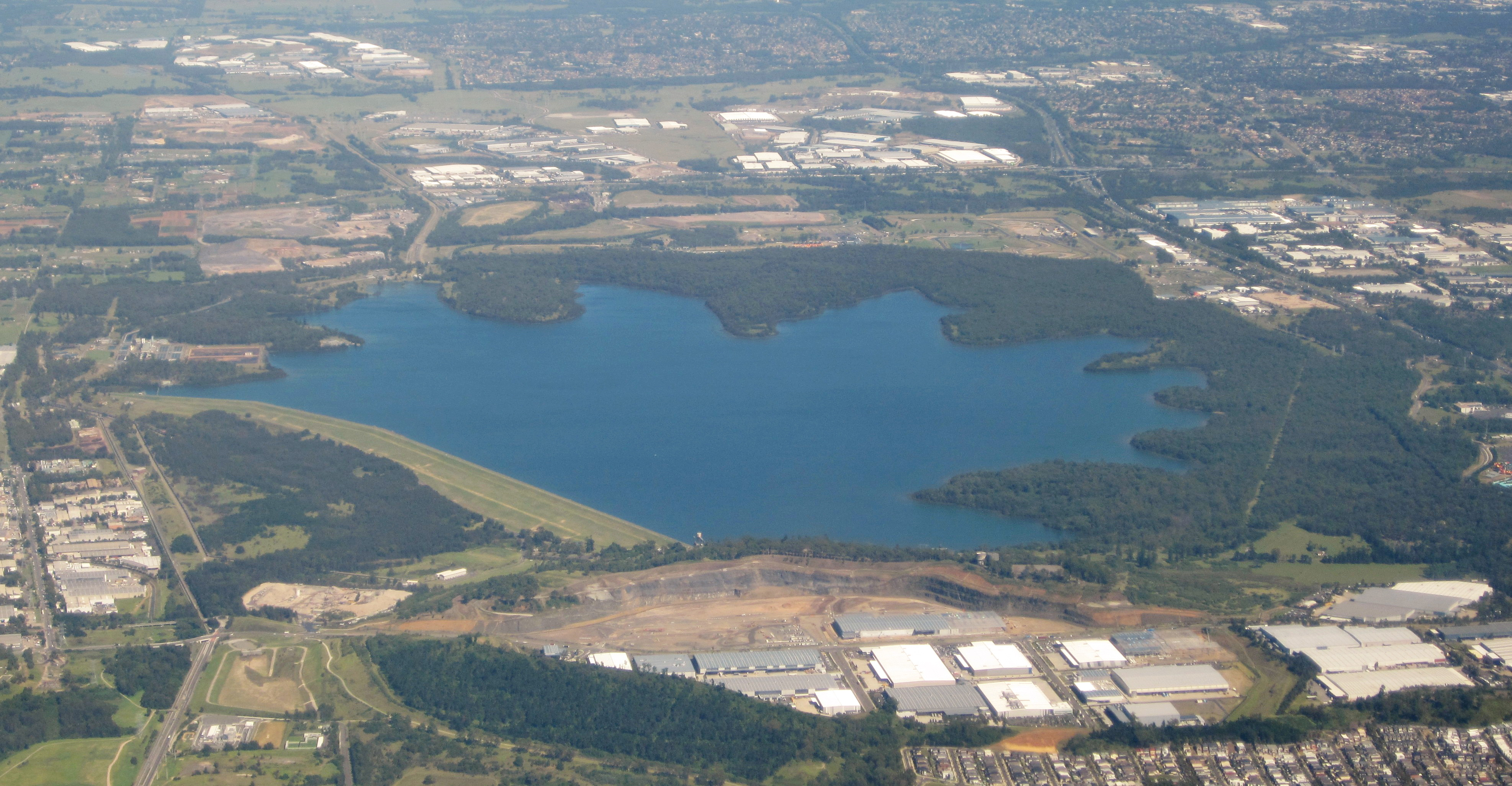
The pale grey water tower can be seen faintly at centre-right of this image, just front of Prospect Reservoir at a precipice.

== See also ==
- Bankstown Reservoir
- Ashfield Reservoir
