= Ashbury, New South Wales =

Ashbury
- Suburb
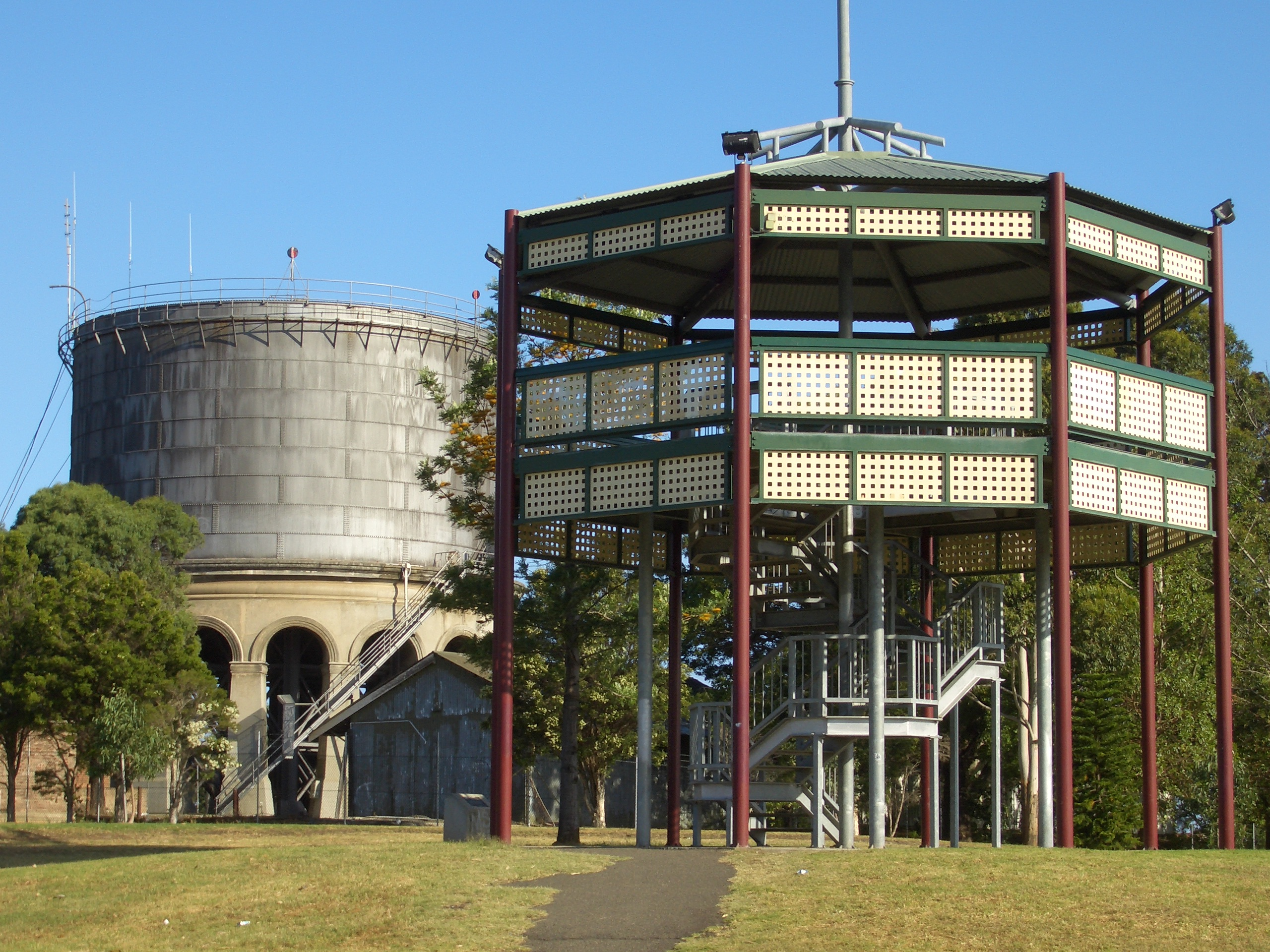
- Peace Park

- Interactive map of Ashbury
- Coordinates: 33°54′11″S 151°06′59″E
- Country: Australia
- State: New South Wales
- City: Sydney
- LGAs: City of Canterbury-Bankstown; Inner West Council
- Location: 9 km (5.6 mi) south-west of Sydney CBD
- Established: 1919

Government
  - State electorates: Summer Hill; Canterbury; Strathfield
  - Federal divisions: Grayndler; Watson

Area
  - Total: 1.03 km^{2} (0.40 sq mi)
- Elevation: 37 m (121 ft)

Population
  - Total: 3,353 (2021 census)
  - Density: 3,255/km^{2} (8,430/sq mi)
- Postcode: 2193
Suburbs around Ashbury
Croydon	Ashfield	Summer Hill
Croydon Park	Ashbury	Dulwich Hill
Campsie	Canterbury	Hurlstone Park

Ashbury is a suburb in the Inner West of Sydney, in the state of New South Wales, Australia. It lies in the local government area of City of Canterbury-Bankstown with some areas in the Inner West Council and is about 10 kilometres south-west of the Sydney central business district. The postcode is 2193, the same as neighbouring Canterbury and Hurlstone Park.

Ashbury is mostly residential and has no commercial centre, although there are a few shops on King Street. Its major landmark is Peace Park, the highest point in the Canterbury local government area. Ashbury derived its name from the two neighbouring suburbs Ashfield and Canterbury. It is near Canterbury Park Racecourse.

== History ==
Before the British colony at Sydney, the Ashbury area was home to the Wangal and Cadigal people, clans of the Darug tribe. After pressure from colonists, the British administration began subdividing land in the area surrounding the Sydney settlement and granting it to colonists. The first land grant in the area was 100 acres (40 ha) made to Reverend Richard Johnson (1753–1827), the colony's first chaplain.

The land that extended over Ashbury was known as Canterbury Vale. When it was sold to Lieutenant William Cox in 1800, it covered 600 acres (240 ha). It was then sold to Robert Campbell (1769–1846) in 1803 when it covered 900 acres (360 ha) and then proceeded to purchase more land to Liverpool Road. The estate passed onto his son-in-law Arthur Jefferey and was eventually split up. This area then became known as Goodlet's Bush, after an early settler, John Hay Goodlet. In 1878 Goodlet had bought Canterbury House, which had been built by Arthur Jeffreys.

The South Ashfield Brickworks (later called the Ashbury Brickyard) opened in 1910 from the site of what is now Peace Park. Widescale housing development of the area began in 1919. A primary school began taking students in 1924 and in 1926 changed its name from South Ashfield to Ashbury Public School, leading to the area adopting its own identity. A non-official post office was established on King St in the same year. "Ashbury" combines the names of the two nearby towns of Ashfield and Canterbury, although Ashbury itself is also the name of several villages in the British Isles.

=== Early subdivision plans ===
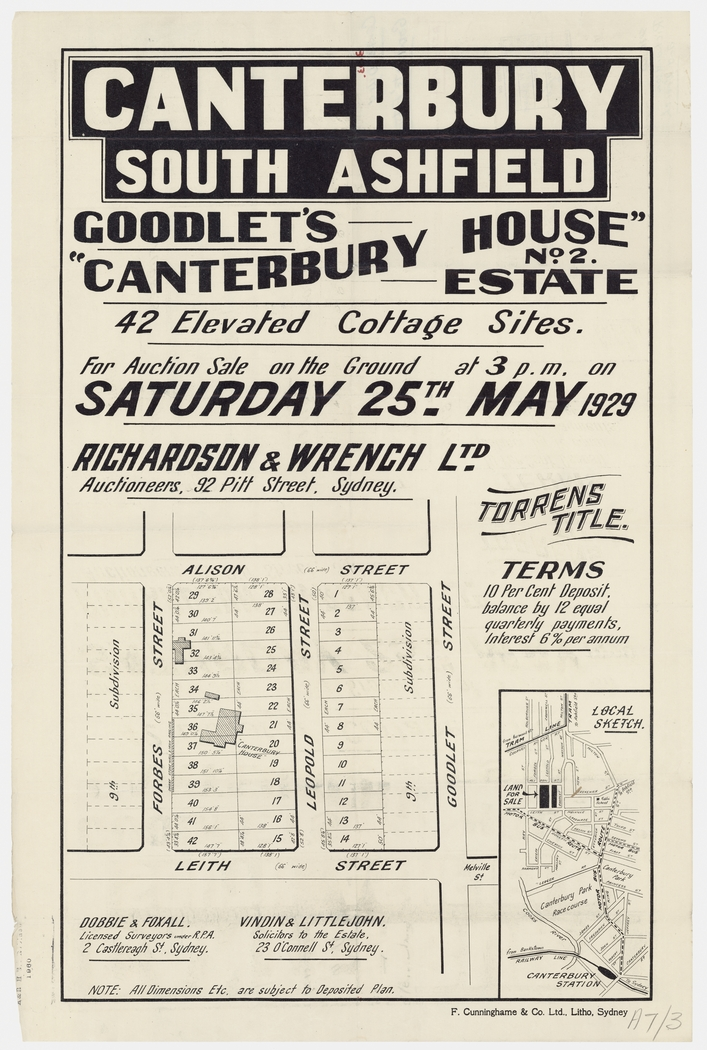
Canterbury South Ashfield, 1929, Richardson & Wrench, Alison St, Leith St, Leopold St, Forbes St, Goodlet St, lithograph F Cunningham and Co

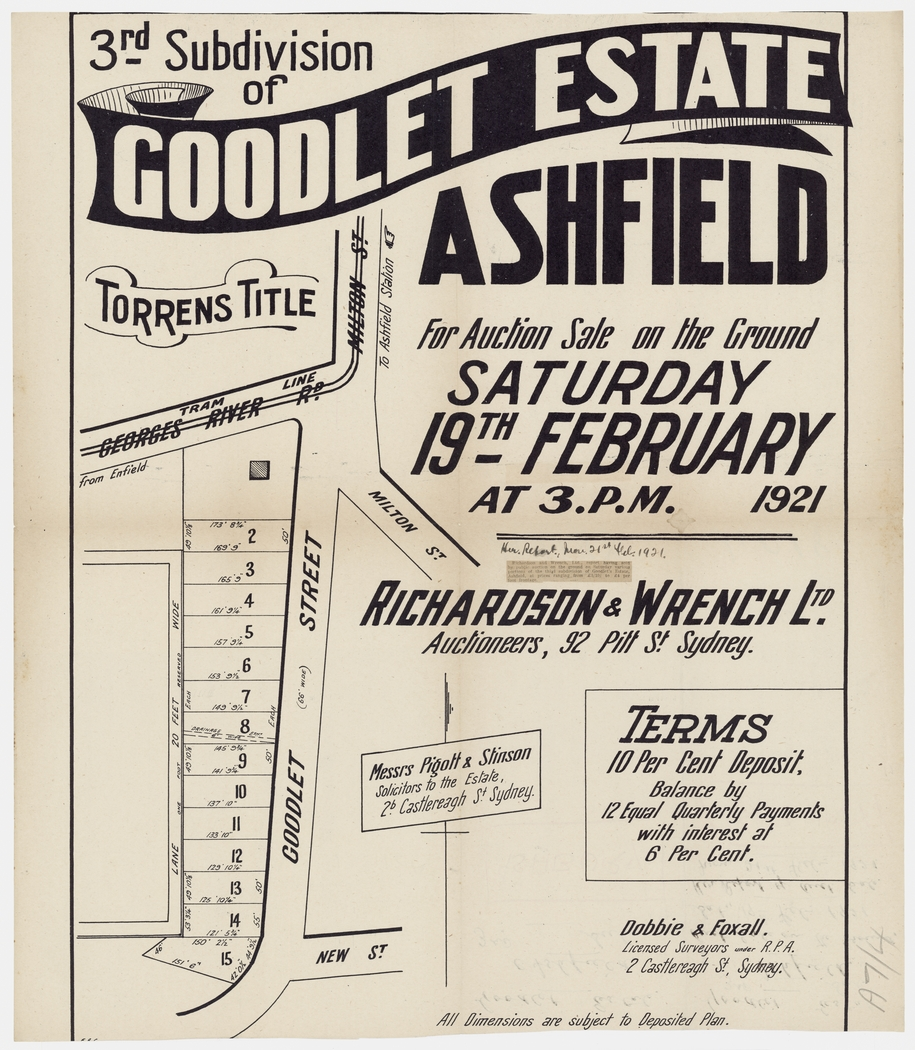
Goodlet Estate Ashfield, 1921, Richardson & Wrench, Goodlet St, New St

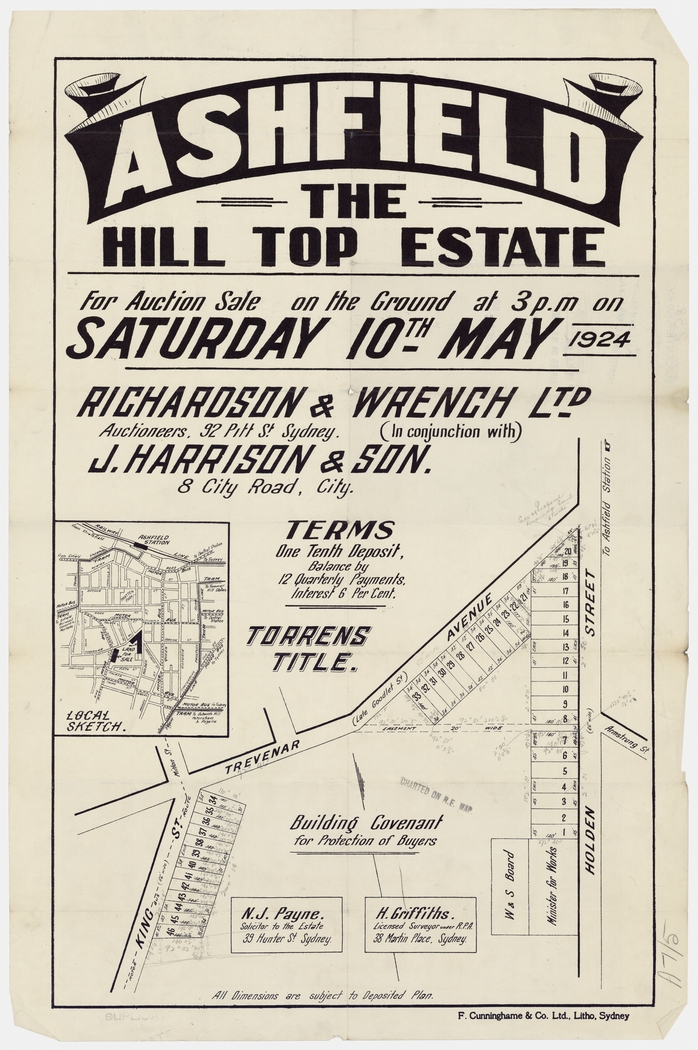
Ashfield The Hill Top Estate, 1924, Richardson & Wrench, Holden St, Trevenar Rd, lithograph F Cunningham and Co

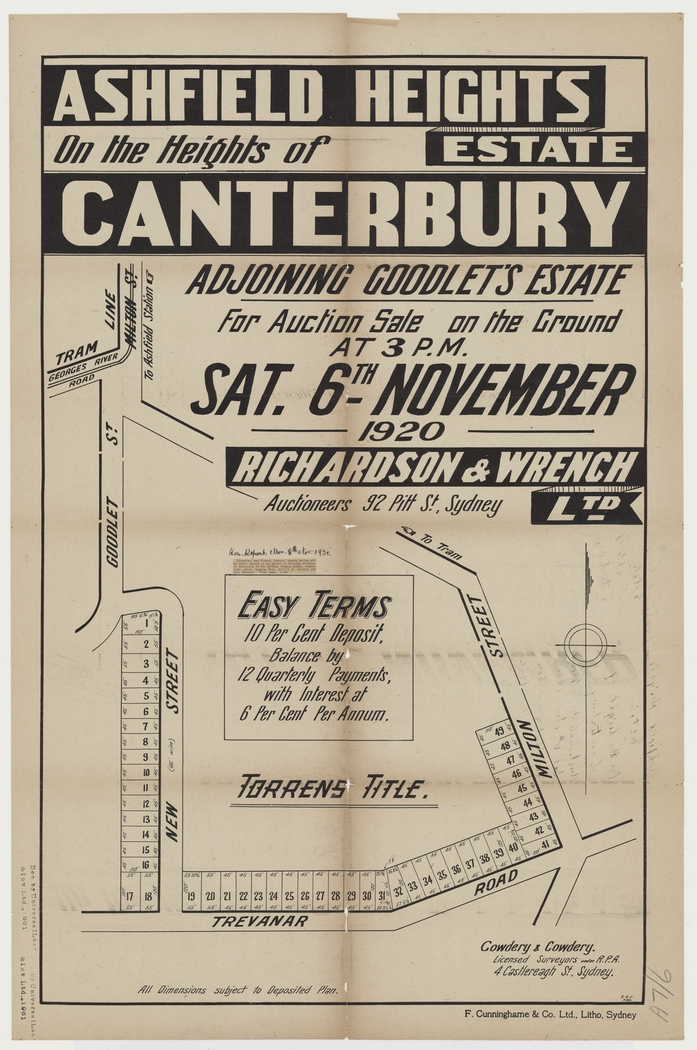
Ashfield Heights Estate Canterbury, 1920, Richardson & Wrench, New St, Trevenar Rd, Milton St, Goodlet St, lithograph F Cunningham and Co

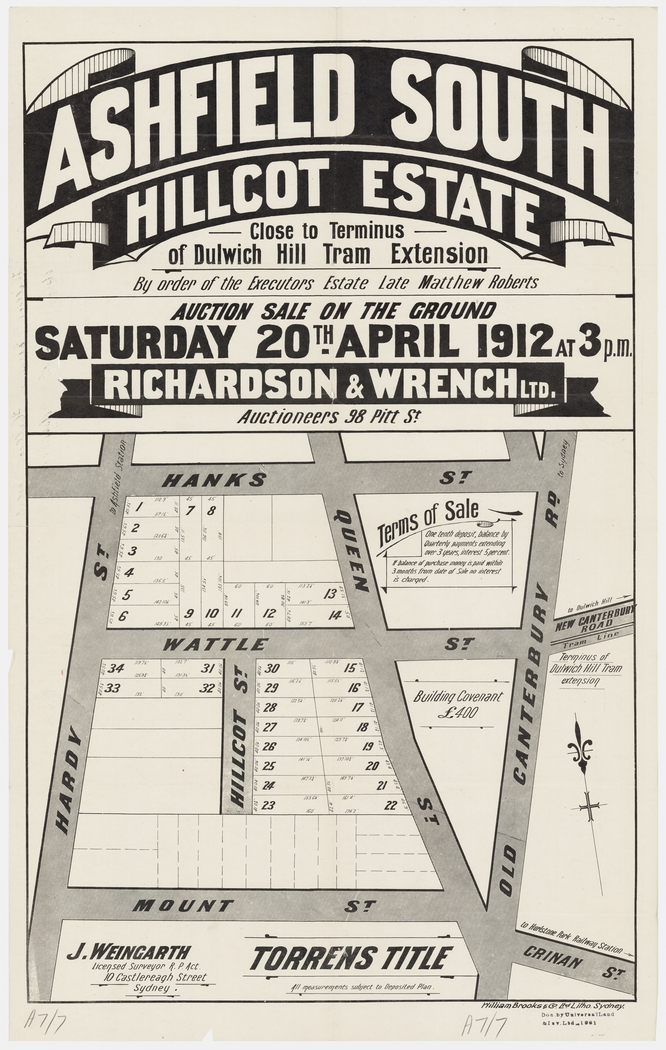
Ashfield South Hillcot Estate, 1912, Richardson and Wrench, Hanks St, Wattles St, Mount St, Hardy St, Old Canterbury Rd, lithograph William Brooks and Co

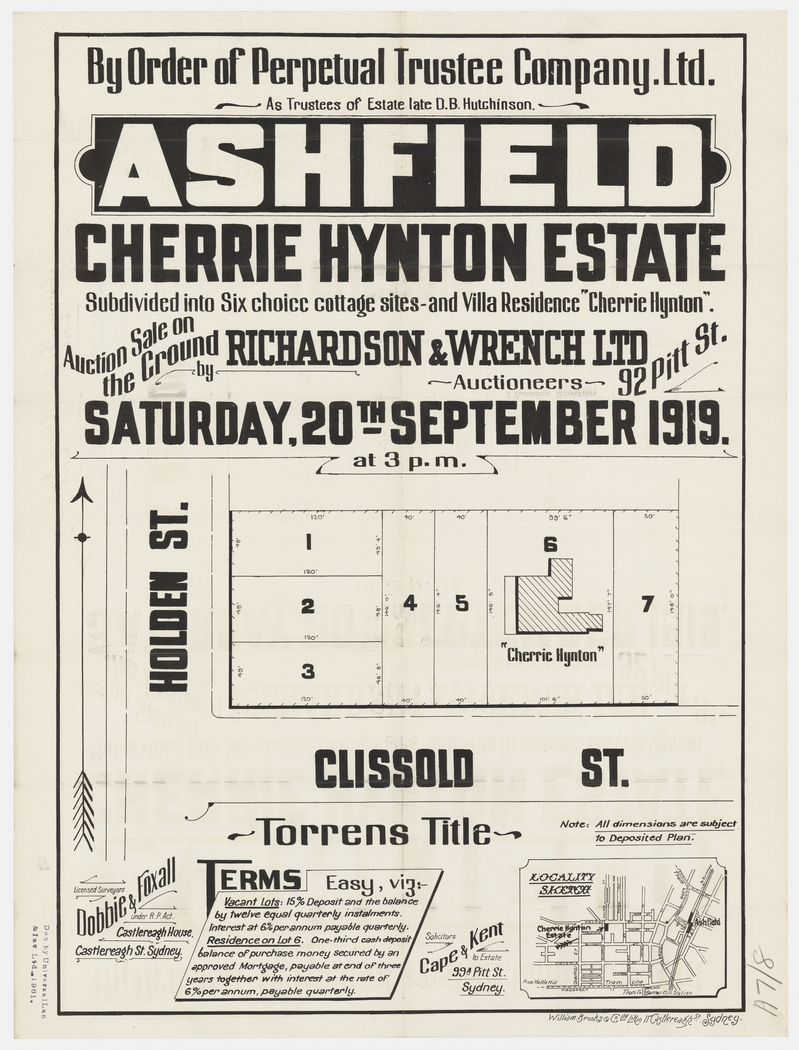
Ashfield Cherrie Hynton Estate, 1919, Richardson & Wrench, Holden St, Clissold St, lithograph William Brooks and Co

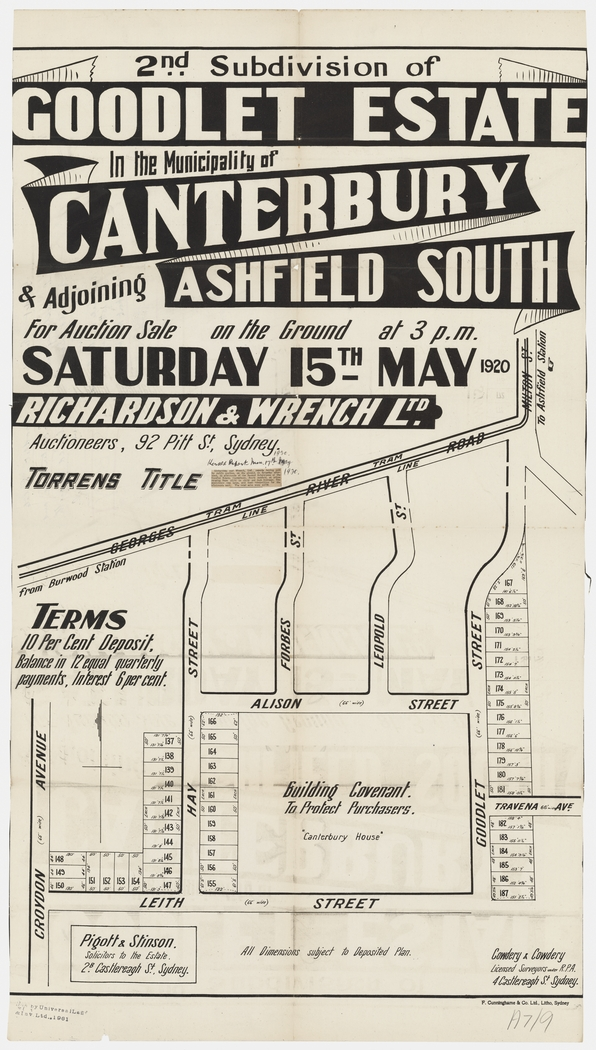
Goodlet Estate Canterbury Ashfield South, 1920, Richardson & Wrench, Alison St, Leith St, Goodlet St, Leopold St, Croydon St

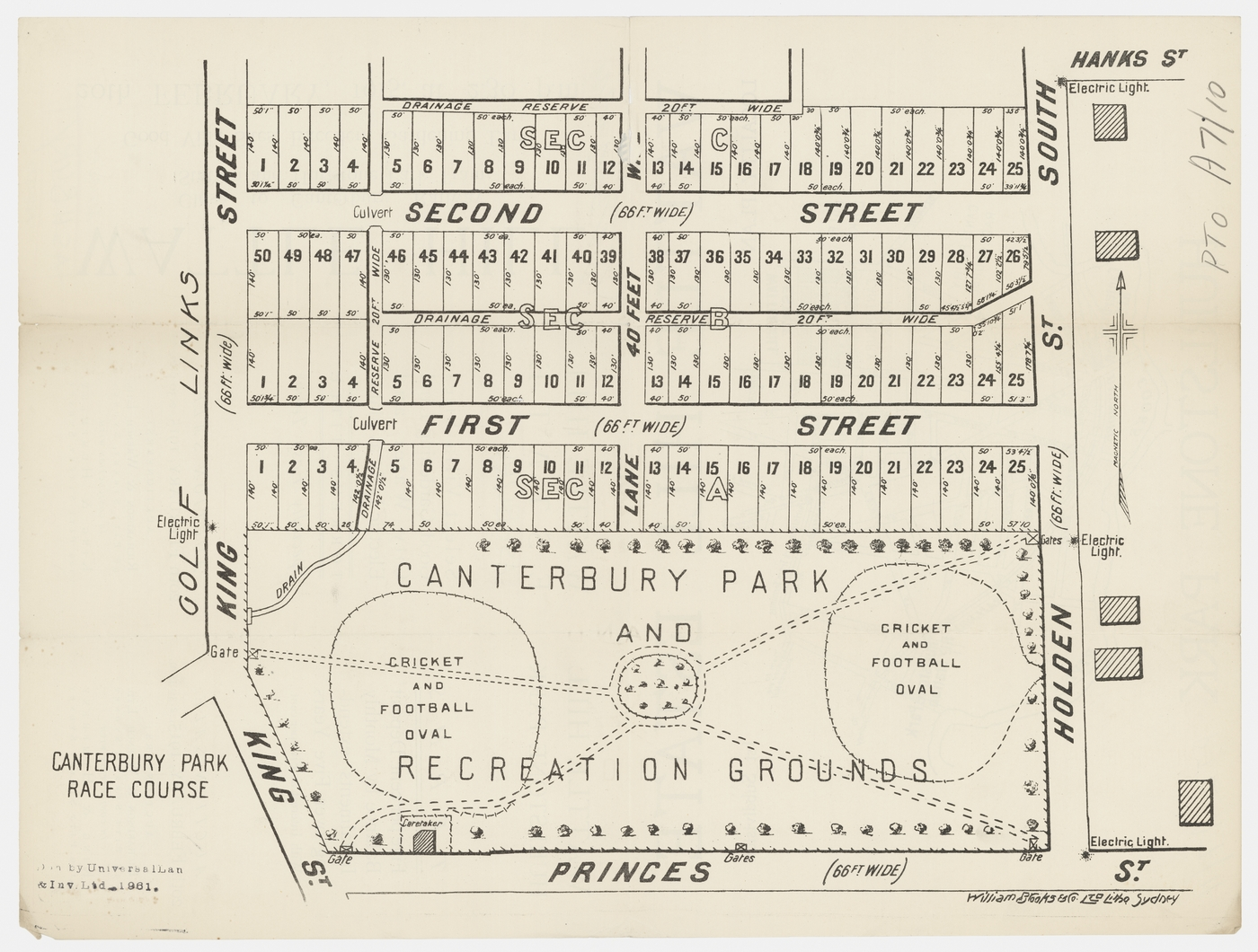
Canterbury Park Race Course, c.1920, Princes St, First St, Second St, King St, Holden St

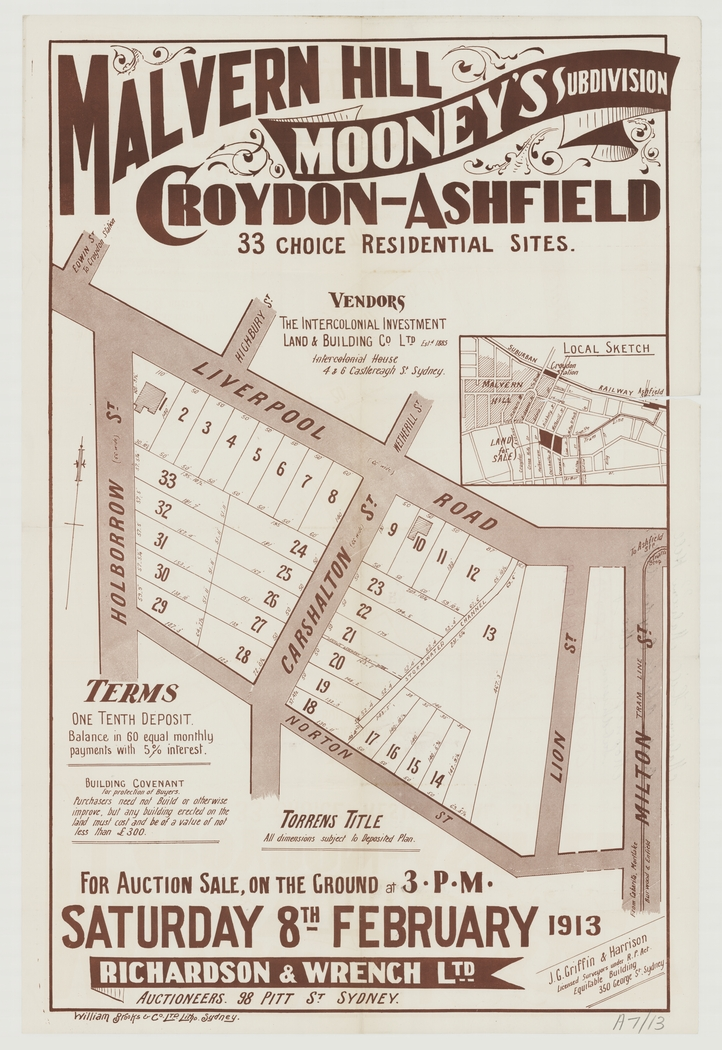
Malvern Hill Mooney's Subdivision Croydon Ashfield, 1913, Richardson & Wrench, Liverpool Rd, Holborrow St, lithograph William Brooks and Co

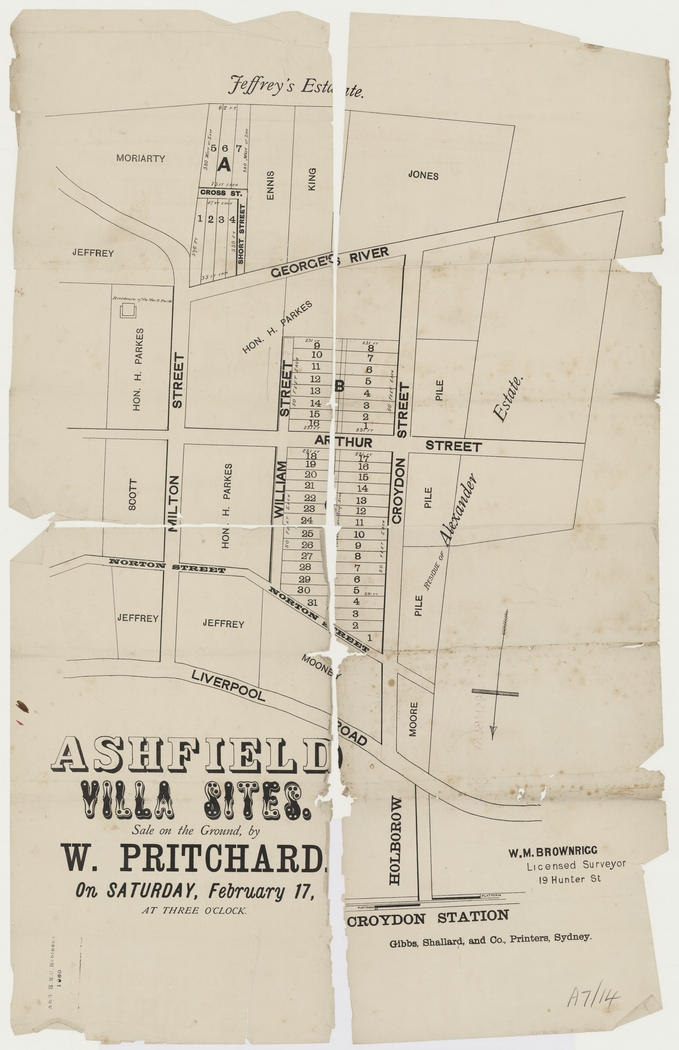
Ashfield Villa Sites, c.1890, W Pritchard, Arthur St, Croydon St, Liverpool Rd, Milton Rd

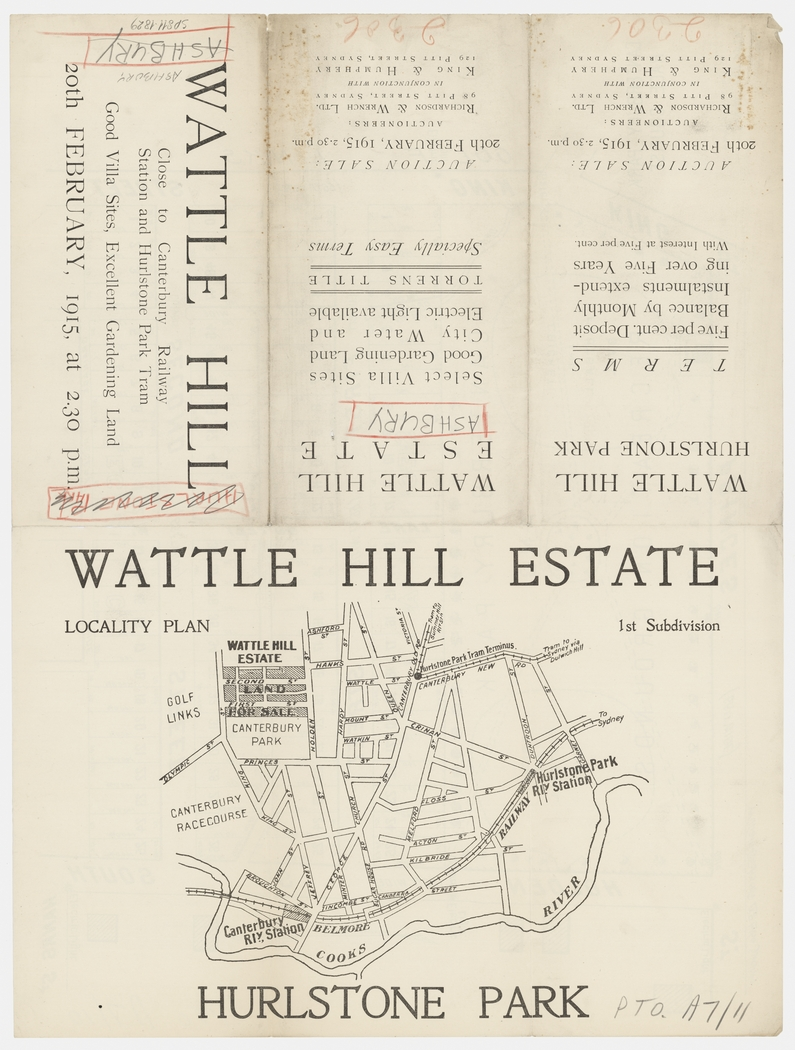
Wattle Hill Estate Ashbury, 1915, Location Map, Richardson & Wrench

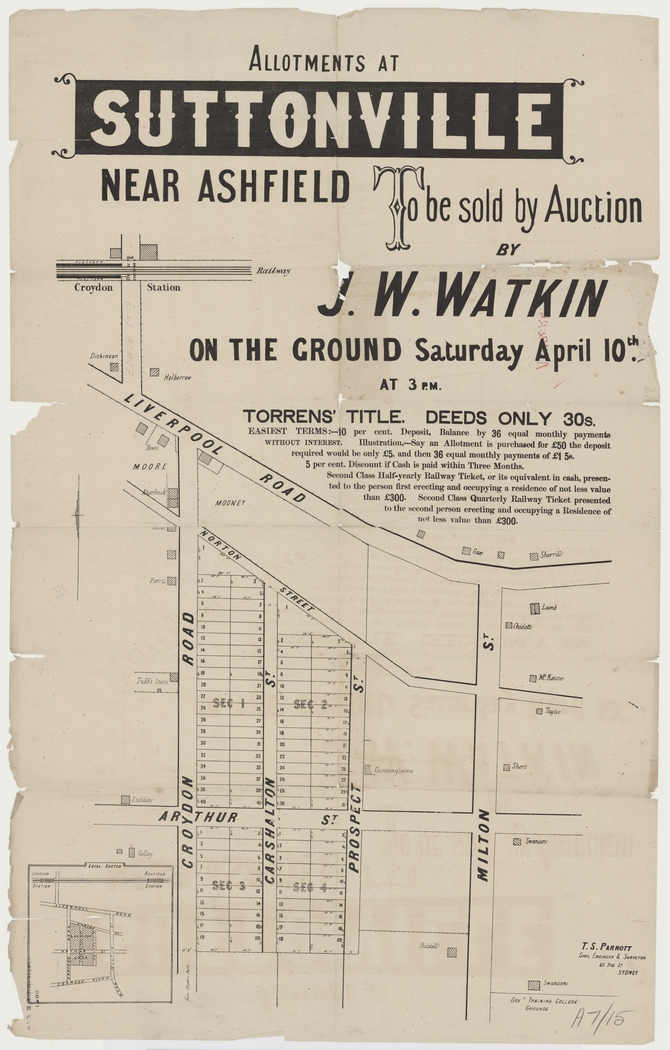
Suttonville, Ashbury, c.1900, W Pritchard, Liverpool Rd, Croydon Rd, Prospect St, Milton Rd

== Transport ==
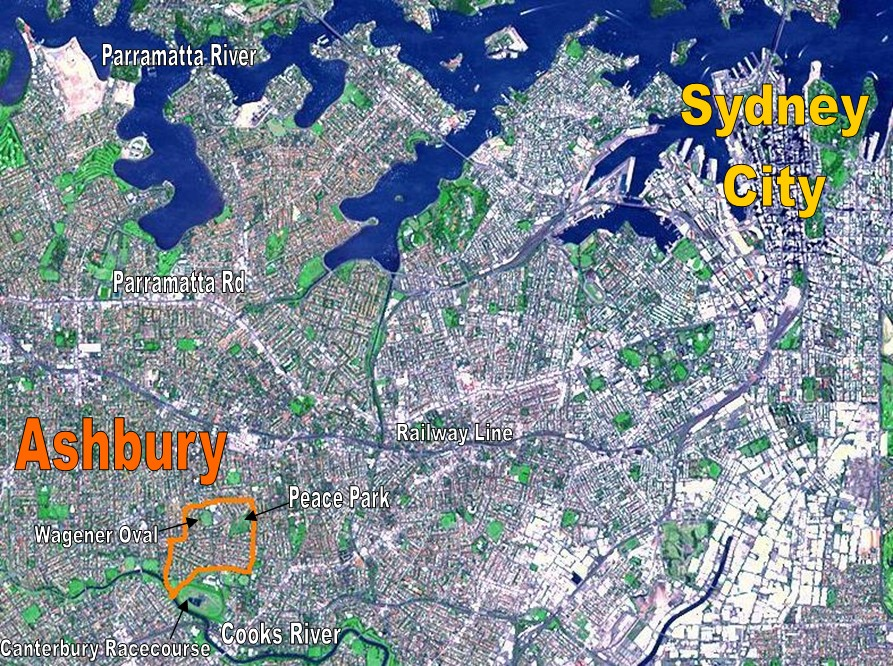
NASA image of Sydney's CBD and inner west suburbs, with borders of Ashbury shown in orange

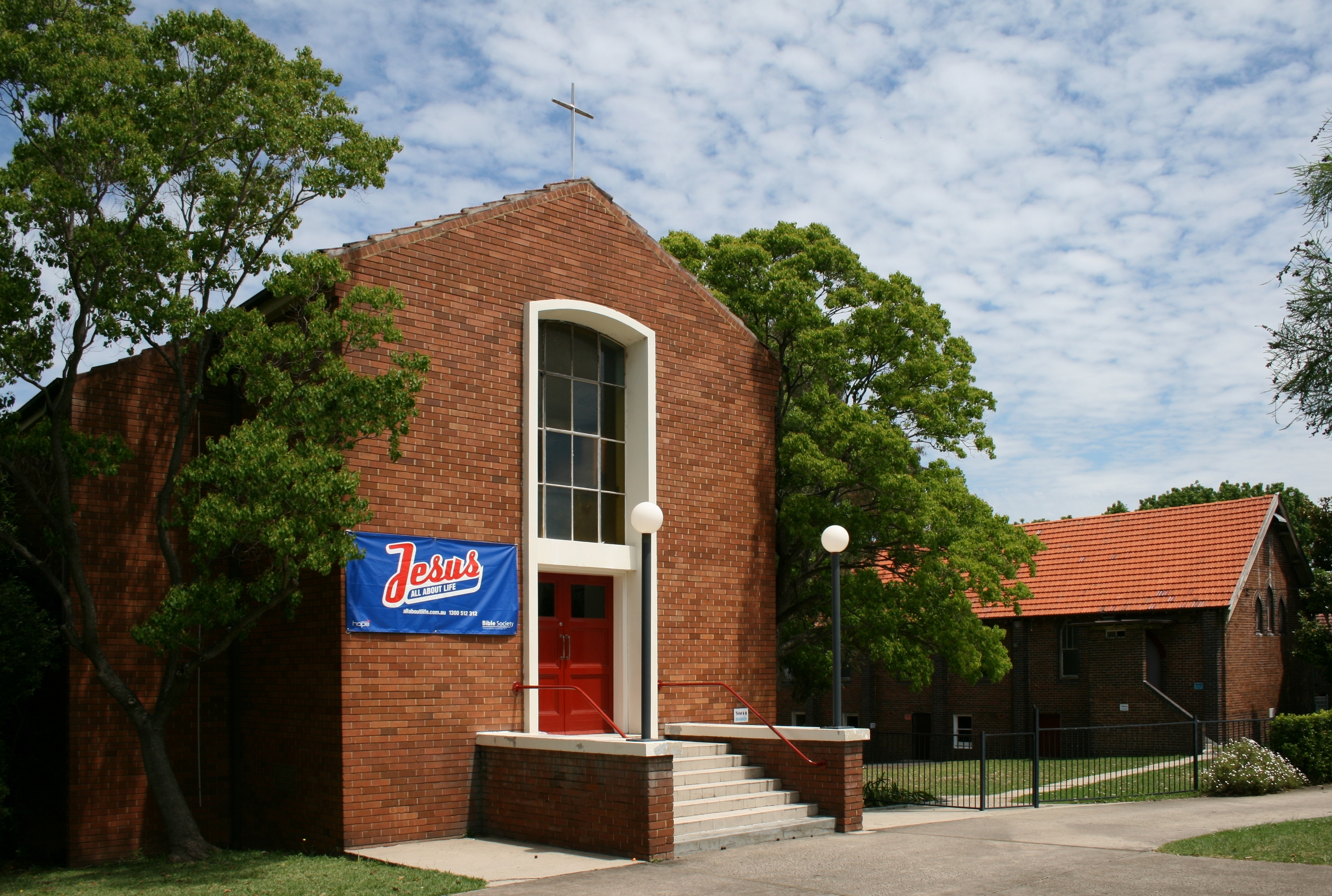
St. Matthew's Anglican Church

Ashbury has no railway station but it is relatively close to both Ashfield station on the Main Suburban railway line and Canterbury station on the Bankstown railway line. Transit Systems buses serve Ashbury. The 491 Five Dock to Hurstville bus links Ashbury to both Ashfield and Canterbury stations from King Street. The 413 bus links Ashbury to both Railway Square and Campsie. Route 418 links Ashbury with Burwood, Ashfield, Hurlstone Park, Marrickville, Sydenham, Mascot and Kingsford whilst the 406 connects Ashbury with Five Dock, Ashfield and Hurlstone Park via Victoria Street and Old Canterbury Road.

Ashbury borders the Cooks River and offers excellent access for cyclists and walkers to the Cooks River Cycleway.

== Schools ==
There are two schools in Ashbury. Ashbury Public School was built in 1928. Its catchment area includes students from southern Ashfield as well as Ashbury. St Francis Xavier's Primary School began in 1930.

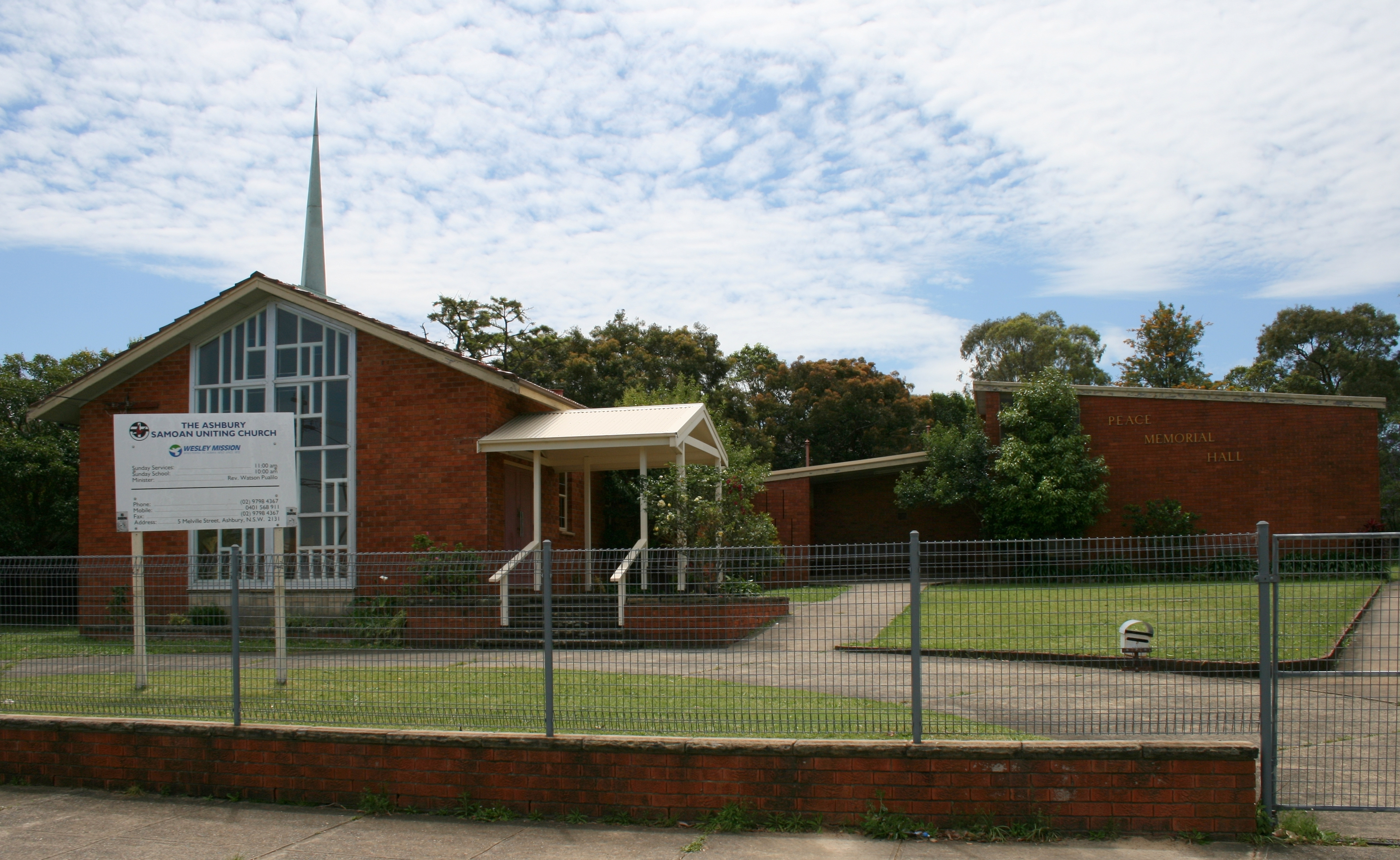
Ashbury Samoan Uniting Church

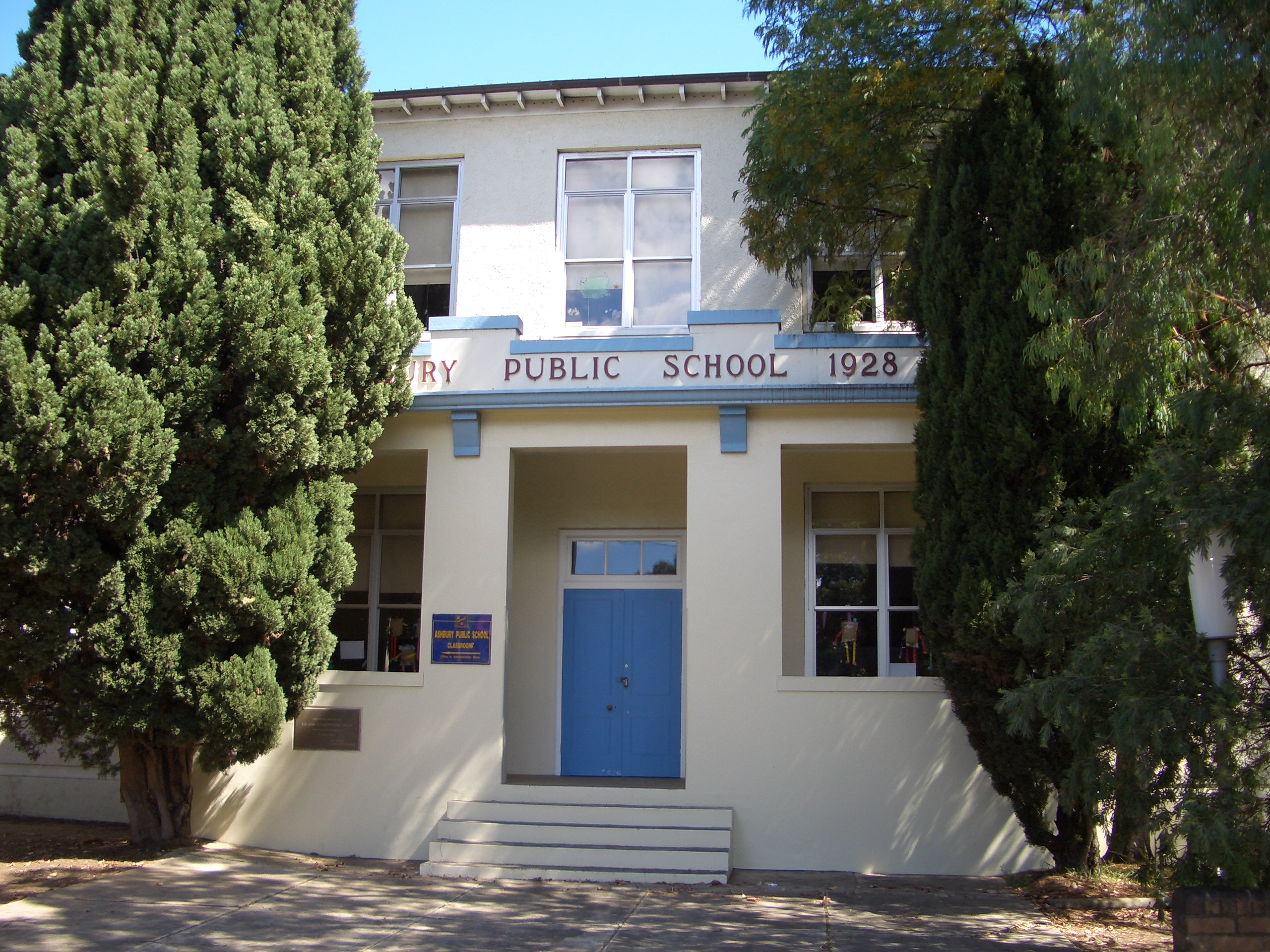
Ashbury Public School

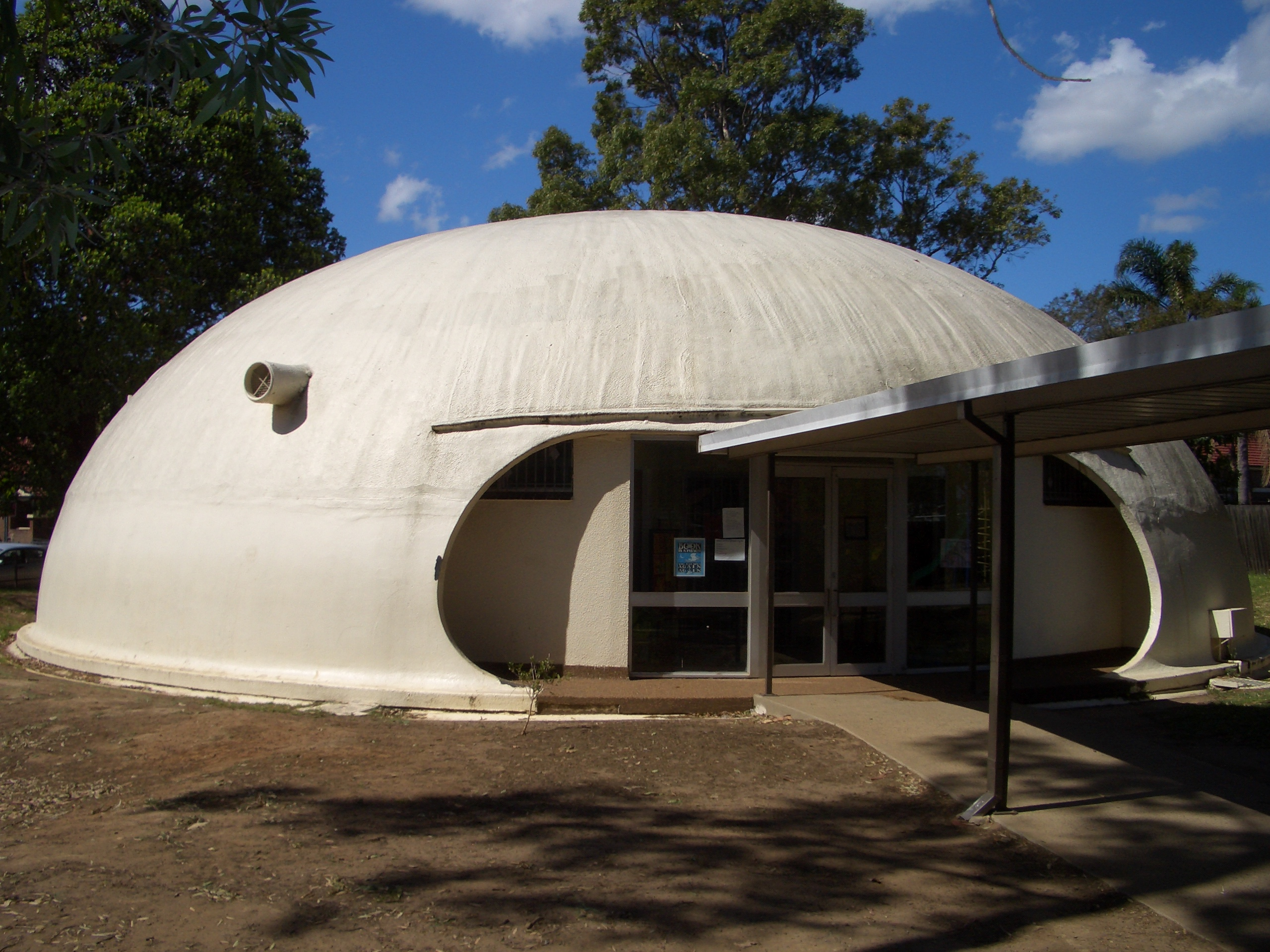
Ashbury Public School library dome

== Housing ==
The area has a consistent subdivision pattern, building form and streetscape, largely because its development occurred over a relatively short period of time. A high standard of design and residential amenity was also achieved, and housing in this area has become increasingly sought after. Ashbury consists of character filled Federation and Californian bungalows which are under heritage conservation making the suburb highly sought after.

== Parks ==
Ashbury has a multitude of parks. These Include Lees park, Peace park and Wagner Oval which is a ground for AFL .

== Heritage conservation ==
=== Special character area ===
In 2000, the campaign to protect the suburb's period housing was formally joined by Canterbury Council's Labor Party. Federation, Californian Bungalow, and Art Deco style dwellings were built mainly during a period that spanned four decades, from the beginning of the Twentieth Century, into the 1940s. Californian Bungalow and Art Deco style houses are referred to as Inter-War Period Housing. The homes built during this time reflected a sentiment which embraced the Art Nouveau movement covering the period from 1890 to 1910.

=== Heritage architecture ===
The predominant architectural style typifying Ashbury is "Californian Bungalow". Built in the nineteen twenties, the original allotments were occupied by single storey, single dwellings, which were designed and constructed using a variety of repeated floor plans. The architectural forms featured mostly gabled and hipped roofs, covered with unglazed red terra cotta tiles. The gables were clad in fibrous cement segmented with vertical timber strip covers. Generous verandahs and leadlight windows were also commonly featured. Timber-framed awnings with decorative timber brackets also enhanced elevations and exposed rafters, dressed-all-round, added to the character and attractiveness of the homely surrounds. External timber sills were often supported by corbelled brickwork, adding a three dimensional protrusion of the windows externally, and the opportunity for a recessed bay internally. This could be used for flower arrangements or placement of ornaments. Awning windows with high sill heights would allow for natural ventilation, weather protection, and security all at the same time. Tuckpointing on manganese or liver coloured face bricks on front elevations was featured, whilst side elevations were finished in common bricks set in lime mortar.

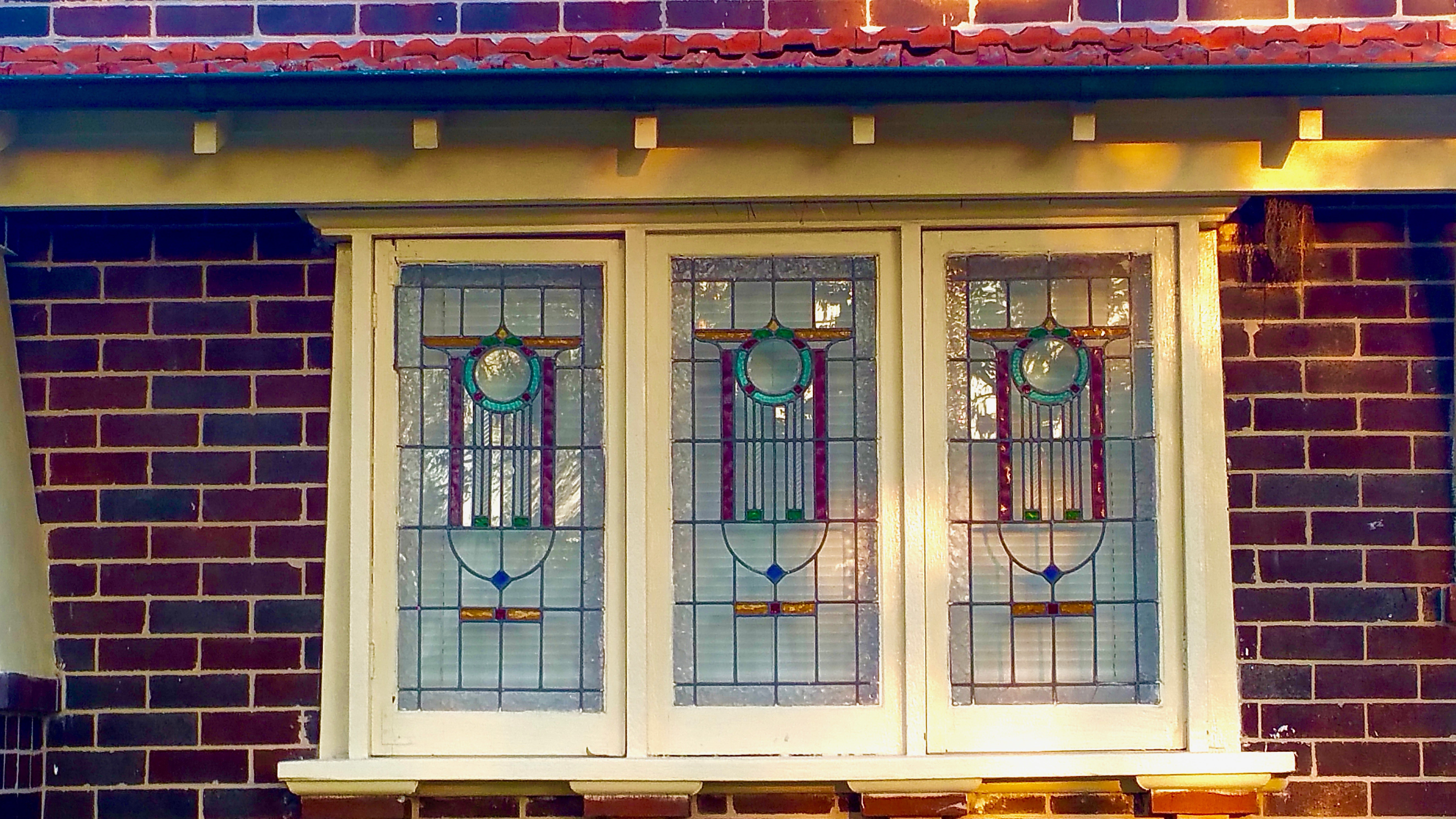
1920s leadlights

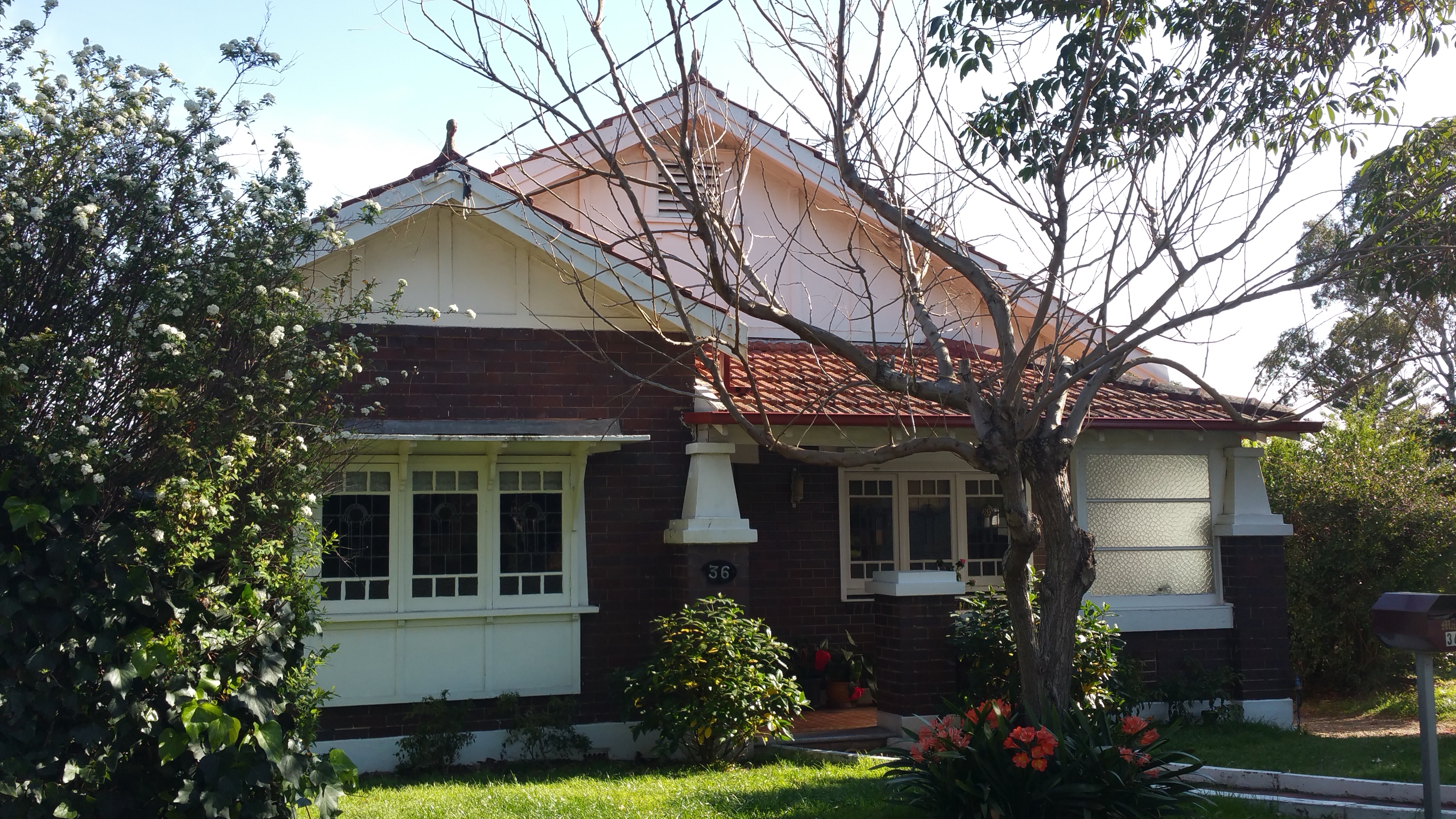
Californian Bungalow Cheviot Street, Ashbury

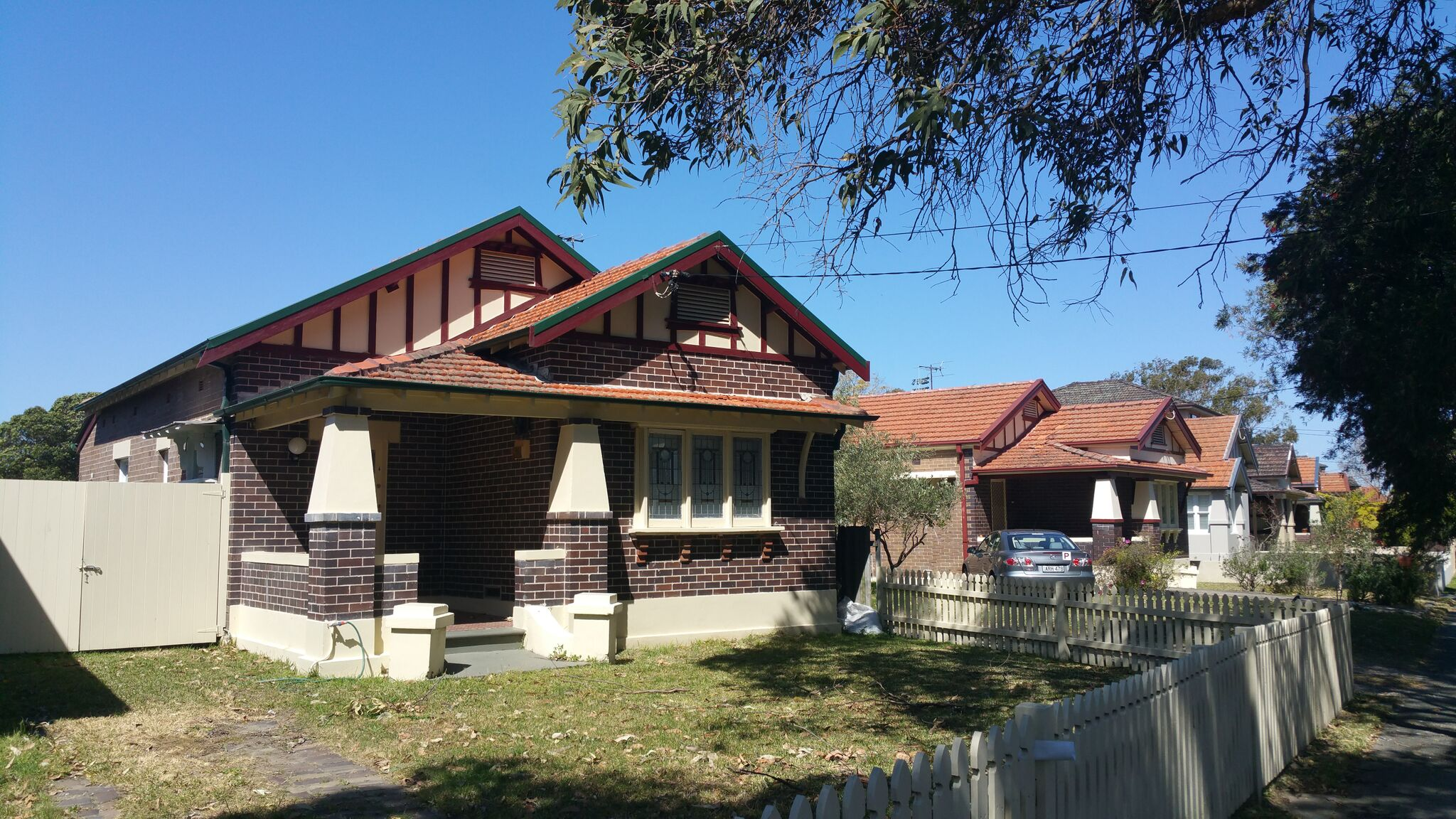
Malleny Street; Californian Bungalow streetscape

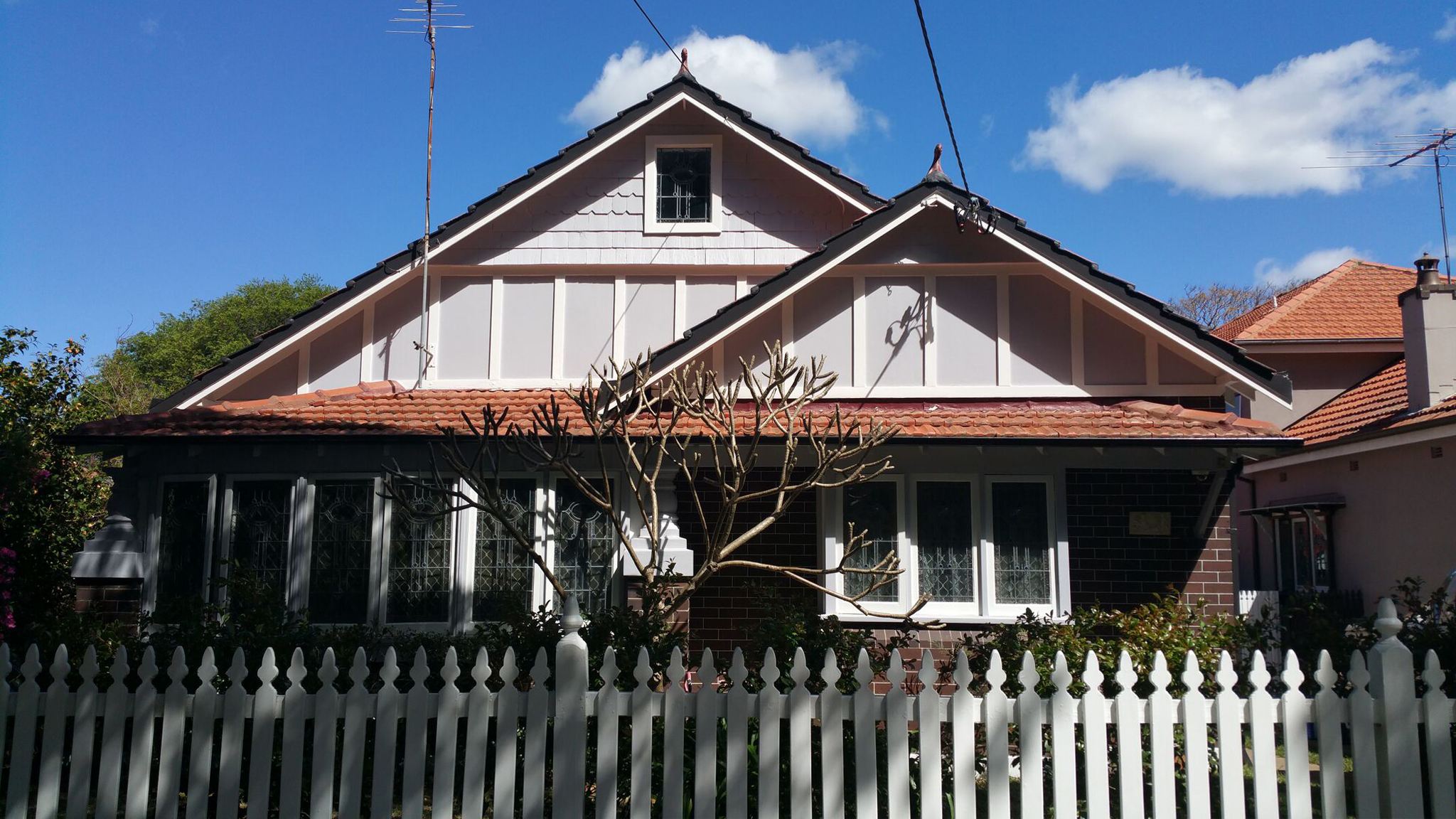
Californian Bungalow in Cheviot Street

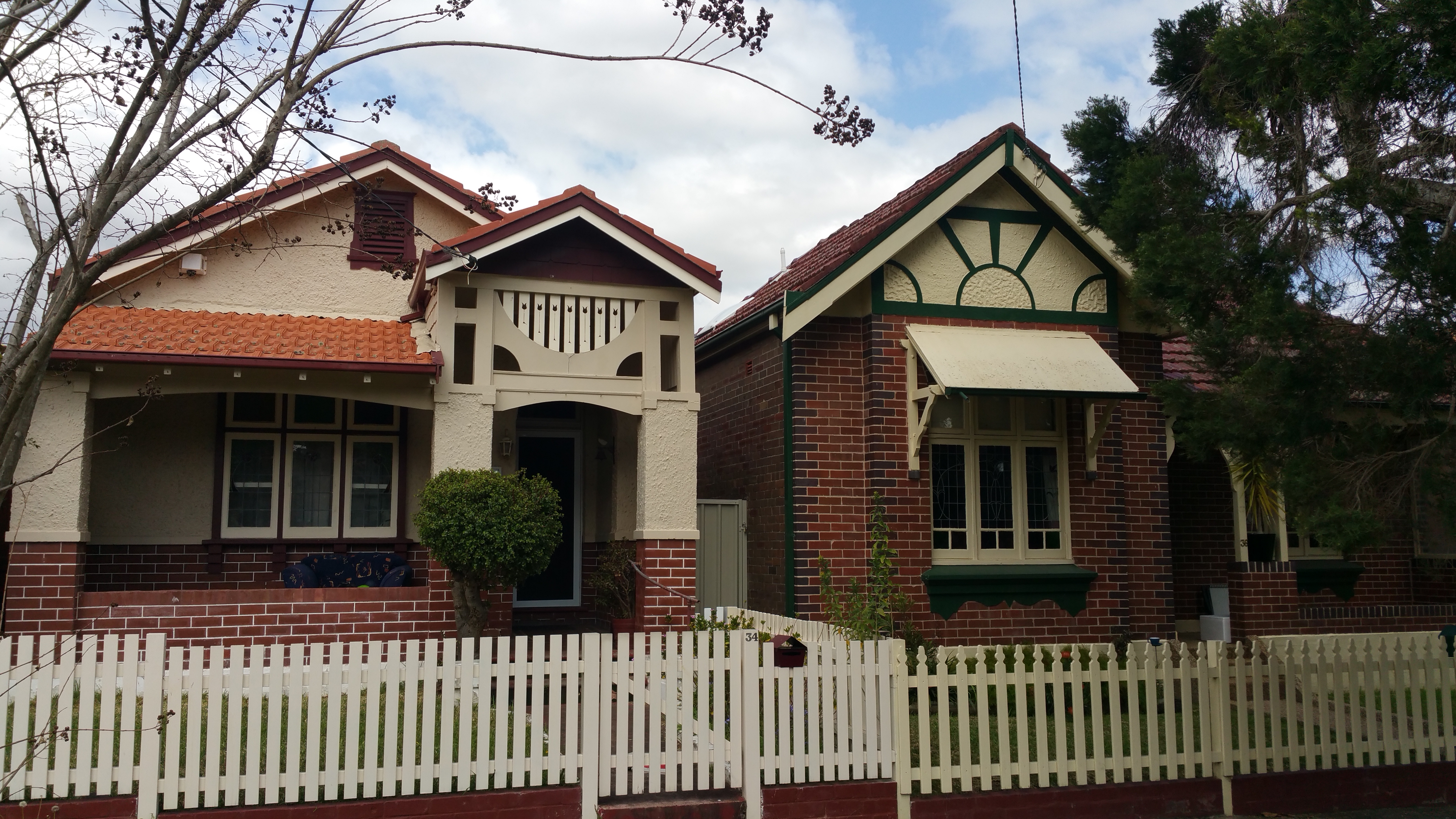
Federation house with roughcast rendering

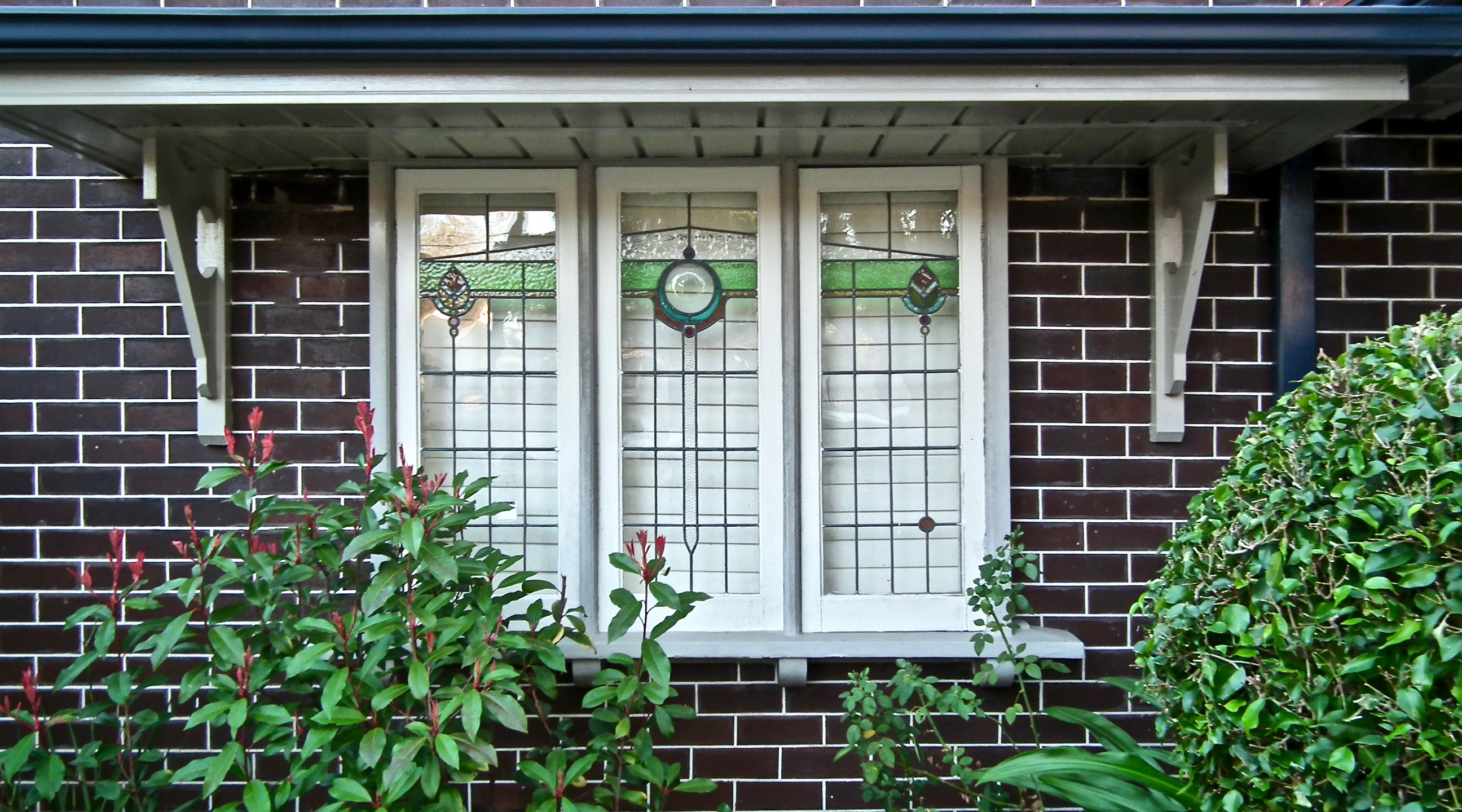
Cheviot Street, leadlight window and awning

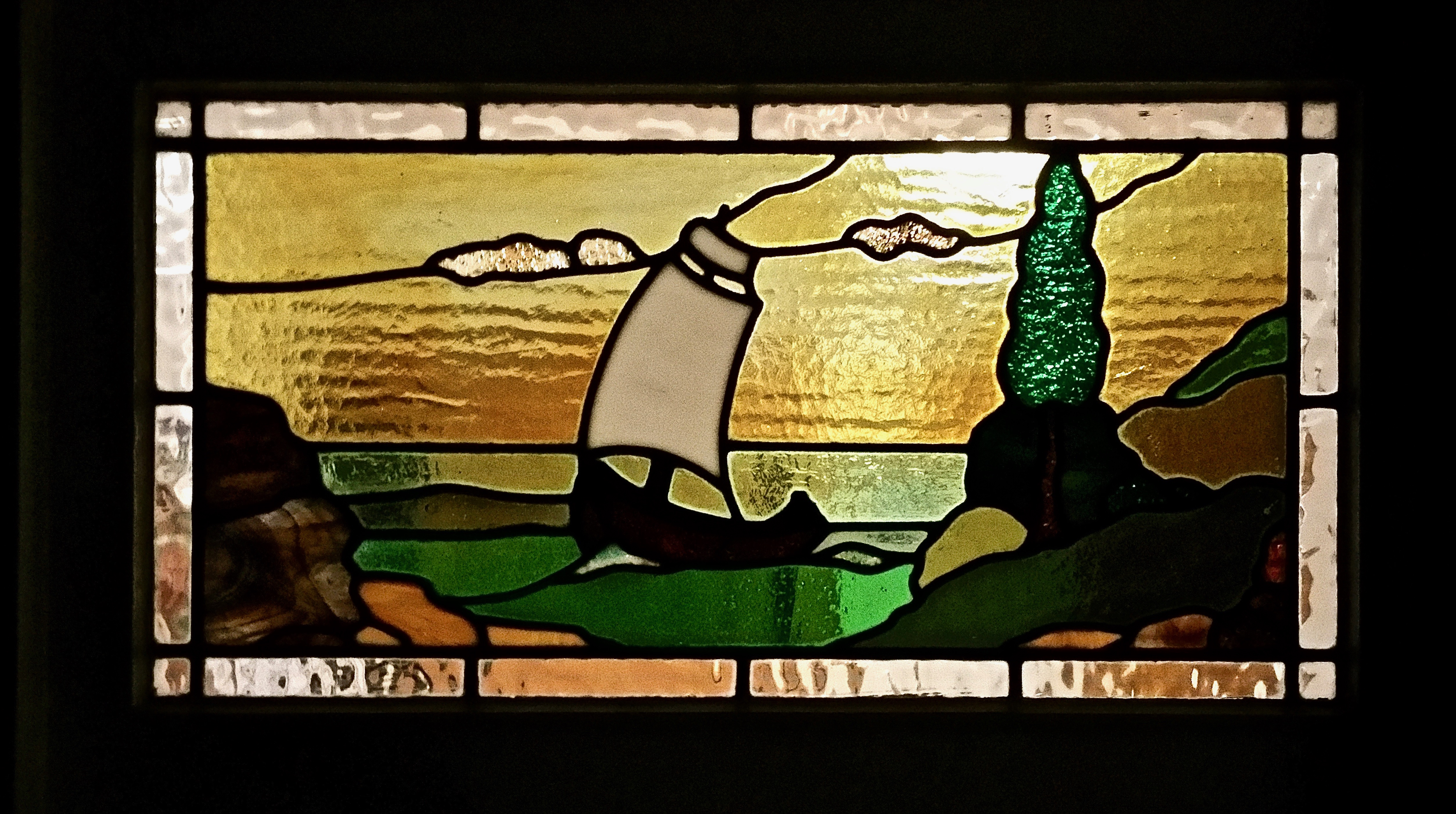
Leadlight window

=== Federation and Inter-war Period architecture ===
Other architectural period styles include Federation and inter-war dwellings of the nineteen thirties. Some Federation Period dwellings included roughcast rendered gable faces and brick piers. Tulips were often incised in decorative timber fretwork, whilst elaborate floral leadlights were found on front and side elevations. Prior to listing the entire suburb for heritage conservation, many of the houses were modified and added to, with little or no consideration for either scale or style of the original architecture. Leadlight windows were designed in the Art Deco style, which is reflected in the many diverse geometric patterns, typical of the 1920s and 1930s. This manifested as a direct divergence from the floral designs of the preceding Federation Period from the first two decades of the 1900s. This artistic approach to home design was reflected in the many variations of detailed elements defining the Australian adaptation of the Californian Bungalow. Picture rails, ceilings, leadlight windows, chimneys and chimney pots, terra cotta tiles and finials were typical elements of this style. Inter-war Period dwellings were marked by the more austere hipped roofs, replacing gables, with leadlights being geometrical and without colour, and brickwork featuring inset textured, or herringbone designs. Some of the houses also included curved brick walls, and Art Deco ironwork of the Universal Style. The single storey, single dwelling streetscape has been largely retained in Ashbury. Where 1st floor additions have been allowed, under the Local Government's Development Control Plan, few have been designed to complement the original architecture.

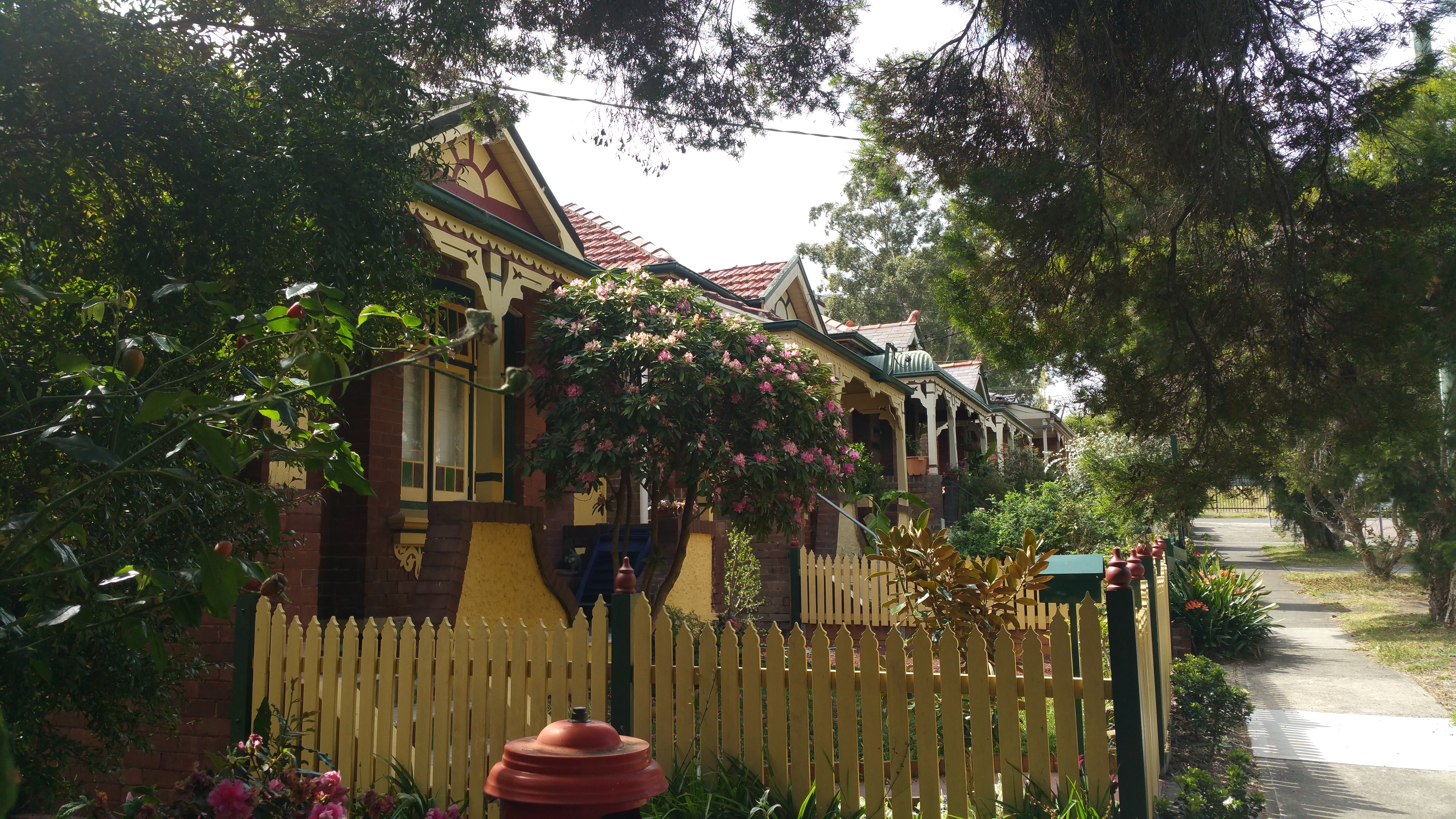
Second Street Ashbury, Federation streetscape

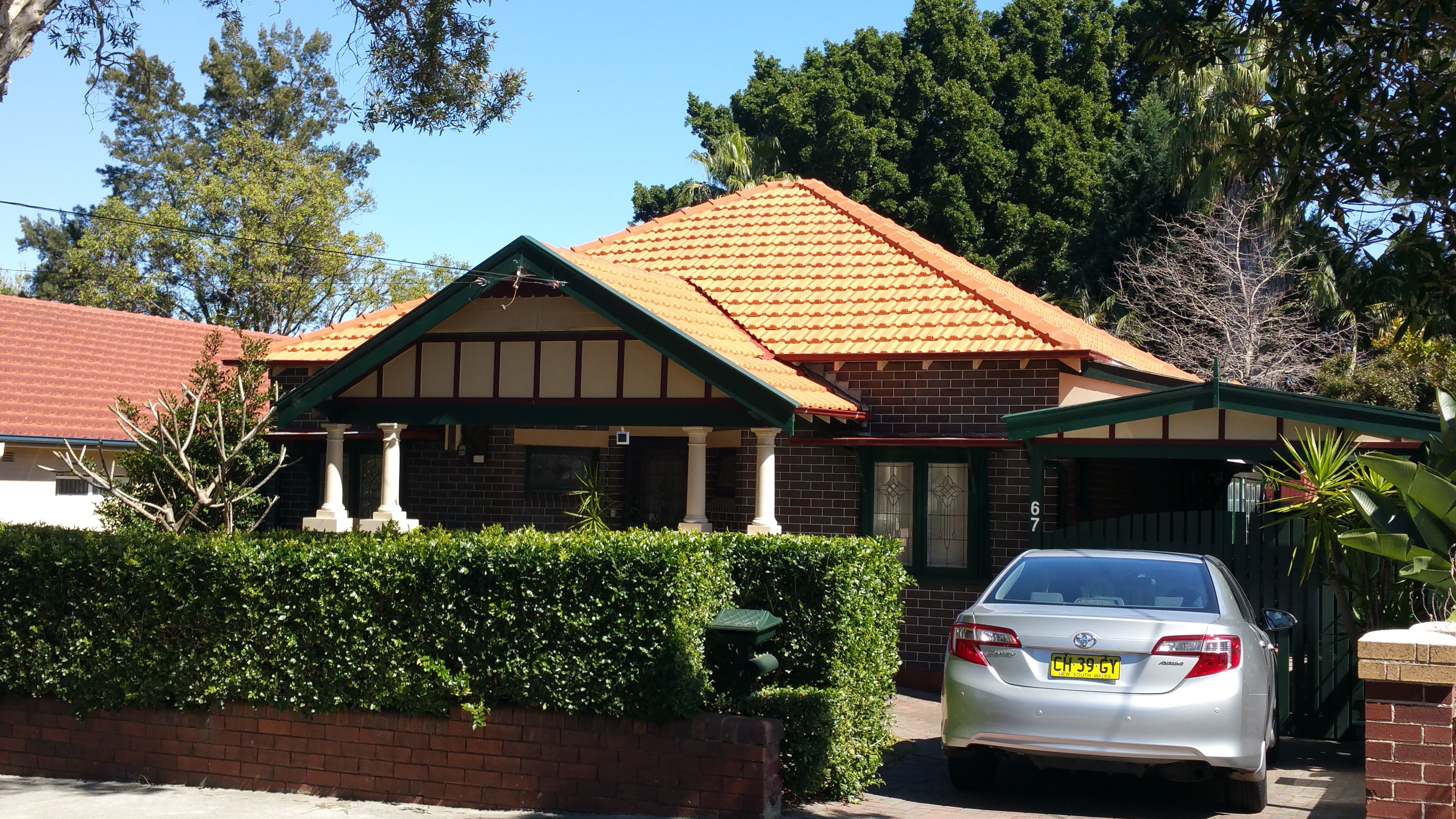
Californian Bungalow in Hay Street Ashbury

Nautical theme leadlight window. Corner of Hay and Cheviot Streets, Ashbury

Rural scene leadlight, Ashbury

Cheviot Street Addition complements existing heritage dwelling

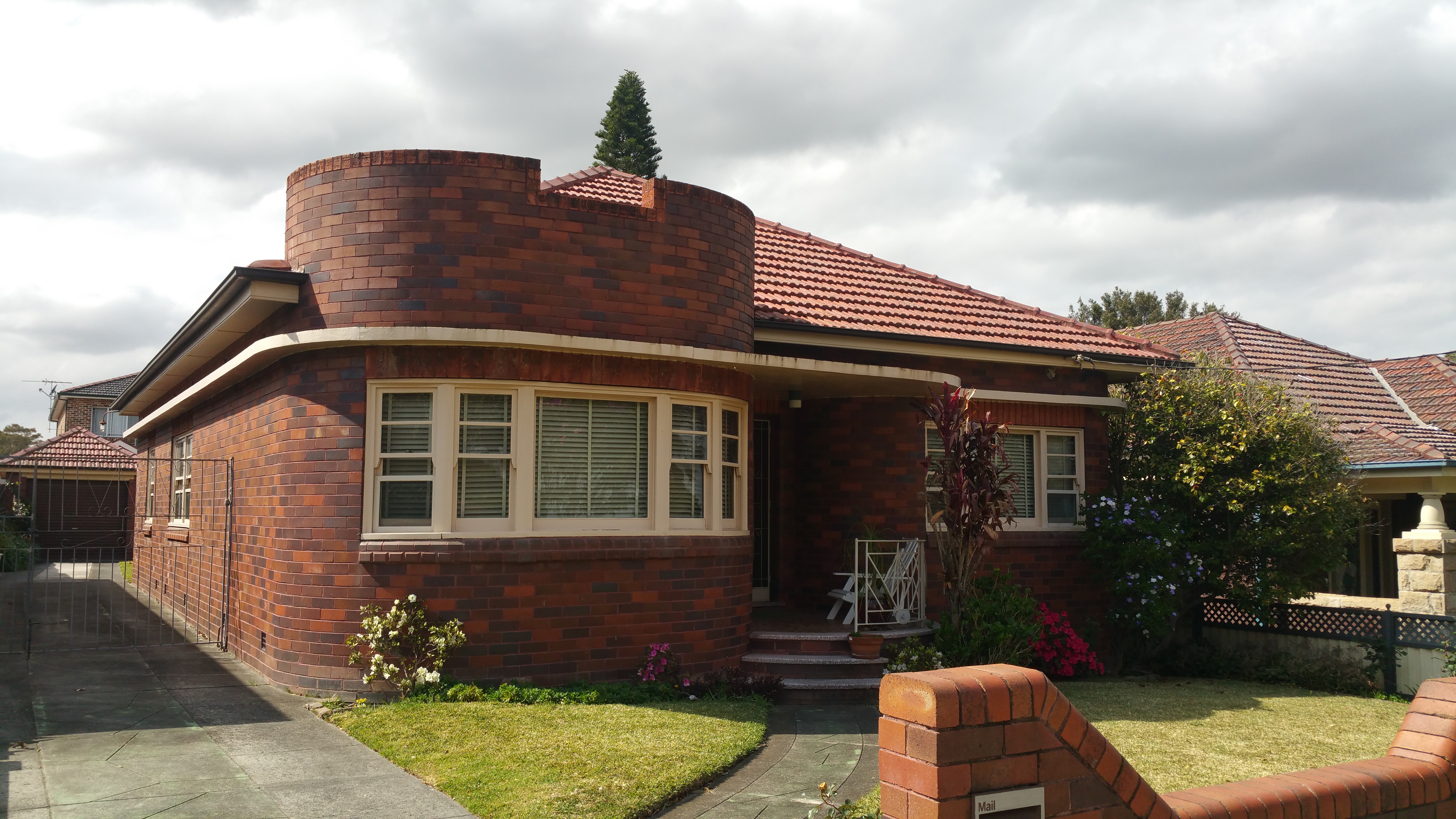
Ashbury Art Deco Universal Style

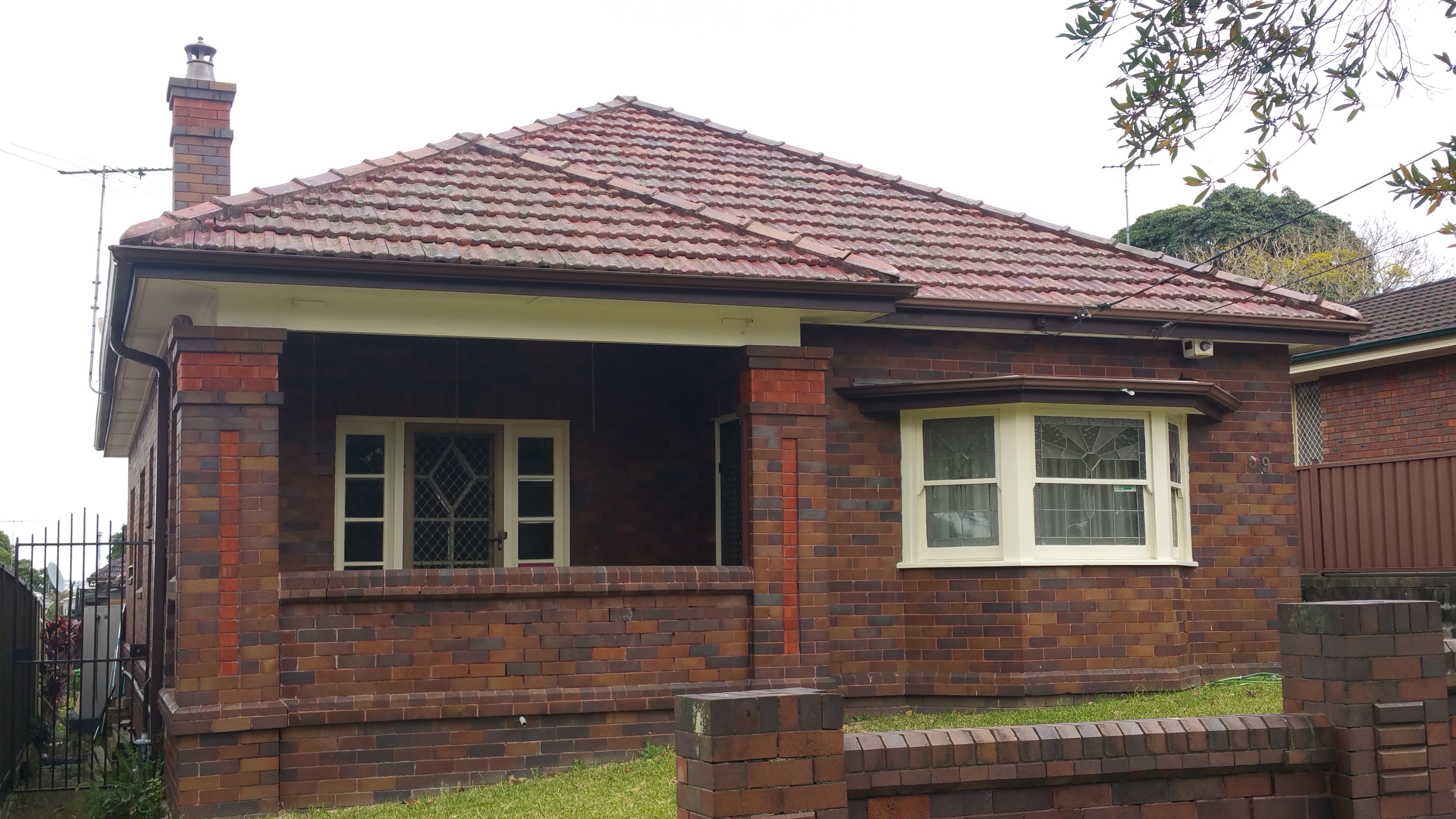
Ashbury Inter-war Period Home

Trevenar Street, showing streetscape with complementary addition

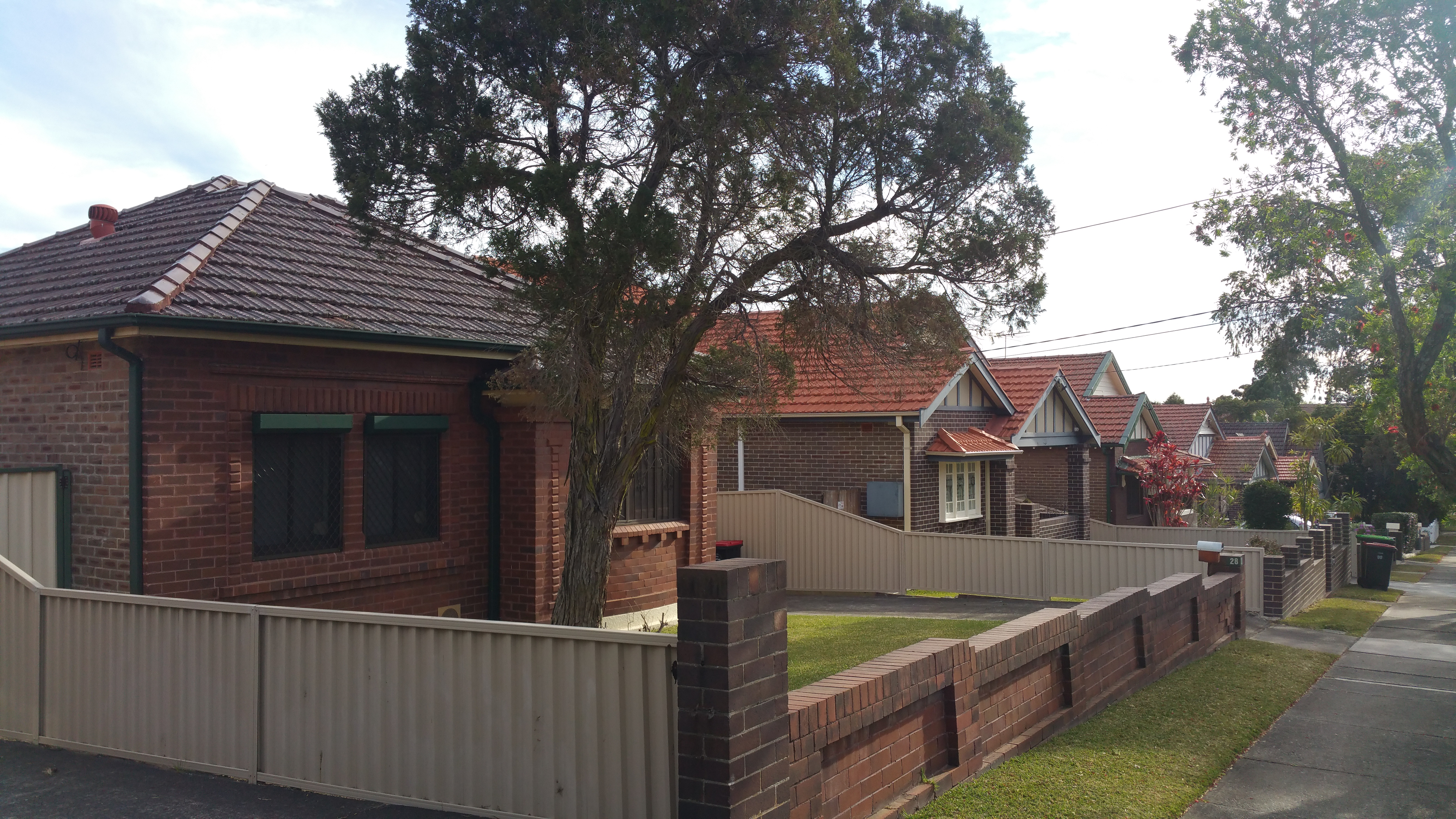
Lasswade Streetscape, Ashbury

== Heritage listings ==
- Holden Street: Ashfield Reservoir

== Demographics ==
According to the 2021 census, there were 3,353 residents in Ashbury. 66.7% of residents were born in Australia. The most common other countries of birth were Italy 5.5%, China 3.1% and Lebanon 3.0%. 62.1% of residents spoke only English at home. Other languages spoken at home included Italian 8.0%, Greek 7.4% and Arabic 5.0%. The most common responses for religious affiliation were Catholic 39.7%, No Religion 26.8%, Eastern Orthodox 11.9%, Anglican 7.8% and Not stated 3.8%. Christianity was the largest religious group reported (66.8% of those who answered this question).

=== Notable residents ===
The following people were either born or lived in Ashbury:

- Selina Siggins (née Anderson; 1878–1964): first woman to stand as a candidate for the Australian House of Representatives (in 1903). She lived in Ashbury from 1928 till her death in 1964.
- Rev Richard Johnson (1753–1827): first chaplain of the colony in Sydney and first landowner in Ashbury, described by Watkin Tench as "the best farmer in the country".

== Politics ==
Ashbury is located in the Canterbury Ward of the City of Canterbury-Bankstown. Canterbury-Bankstown Council is dominated by Labor councillors. Canterbury Ward has one Labor, Liberal and Greens councillor, elected at the last council elections in 2017. The mayor of Canterbury-Bankstown is Labor's Khal Asfour.

Part of Ashbury is also located in the Ashfield Ward of the Inner West Council area.

For state government elections, Ashbury was in the Electoral district of Canterbury, held by Labor's Linda Burney, until 2015 when it was moved to the newly created Electoral district of Summer Hill, held by Labor's Jo Haylen since 2015. For federal government elections, it was in the Division of Grayndler, held by Labor's Anthony Albanese since 1996, until 2016 when it was moved to the Division of Watson, held by Labor's Tony Burke since 2004. The table below details polling results from Ashbury Public School, which has remained Ashbury's sole polling location across elections and division changes, and shows a consistently strong Labor vote in both Federal and state elections.

Voting in Ashbury since 2000
Elections	Fed01	NSW03	Fed04	NSW07	Fed07	Fed10	NSW11	Fed13	NSW15	Fed16	NSW19	Fed19	Fed22
Two Candidate Preferred Results
Labor	61%	nr	63%	72%	65%	56%	56%	58%	nr	65%	nr	60%	64%
Liberal	39%	nr	37%	28%	35%	nr	44%	42%	nr	35%	nr	40%	36%
Greens	nr	nr	nr	nr	nr	44%	nr	nr	nr	nr	nr	nr	nr
First Preference Results
Labor	49%	57%	52%	56%	54%	46%	45%	46%	44%	48%	48%	48%	46%
Liberal	34%	18%	35%	21%	31%	38%	38%	38%	37%	31%	34%	34%	28%
Greens	6%	12%	10%	12%	11%	13%	13%	11%	15%	12%	11%	10%	16%
Democrats	5%	nc	2%	4%	1%	1%	nc	nc	nc	nc	nc	nc	nc
Christian Democrats	2%	nc	nc	5%	2%	nc	4%	2%	2%	5%	nc	3%	nc
Unity Party	1%	2%	nc	nc	nc	nc	nc	nc	nc	nc	nc	nc	nc

Other parties including the United Australia Party and Pauline Hanson's One Nation have also contested elections for which Ashbury Public School was a voting booth.
