= Ashfield Reservoir =

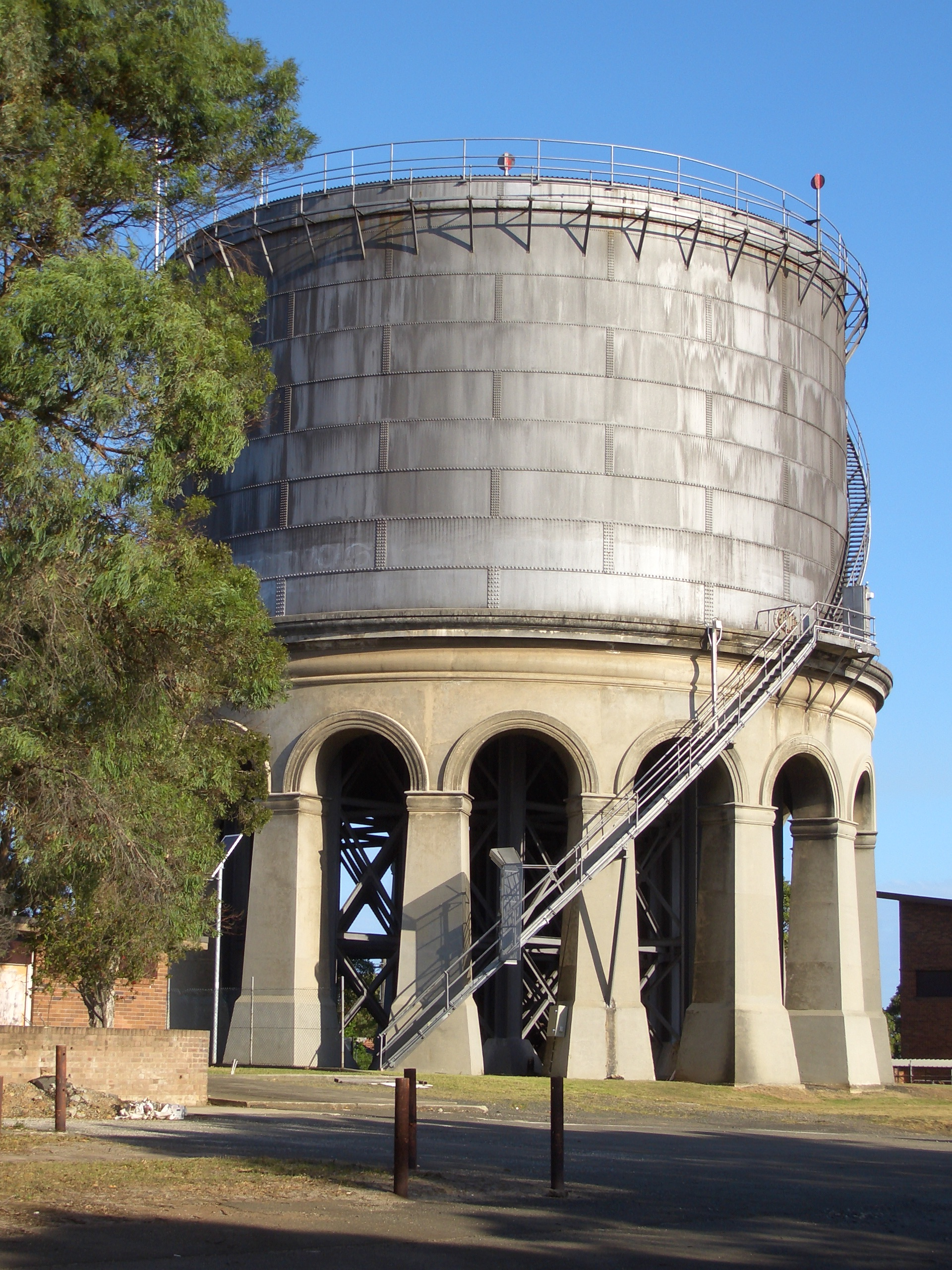
- Ashbury water reservoir,, in October 2008

- Location within Sydney Location within Australia
- 33°53′56″S 151°07′29″E
- Location: Holden Street, Ashbury, City of Canterbury-Bankstown, New South Wales, Australia

History
- Built: 1912
- Built for: Metropolitan Board of Water Supply and Sewerage

Site notes
- Architect: Metropolitan Board of Water Supply and Sewerage
- Owner: Sydney Water

New South Wales Heritage Register
- Official name: Ashfield Reservoir (Elevated) (WS 0003); WS 0003
- Type: State heritage (built)
- Designated: 15 November 2002
- Reference no.: 1622
- Type: Water Supply Reservoir/ Dam
- Category: Utilities – Water
- Builders: Metropolitan Board of Water Supply and Sewerage
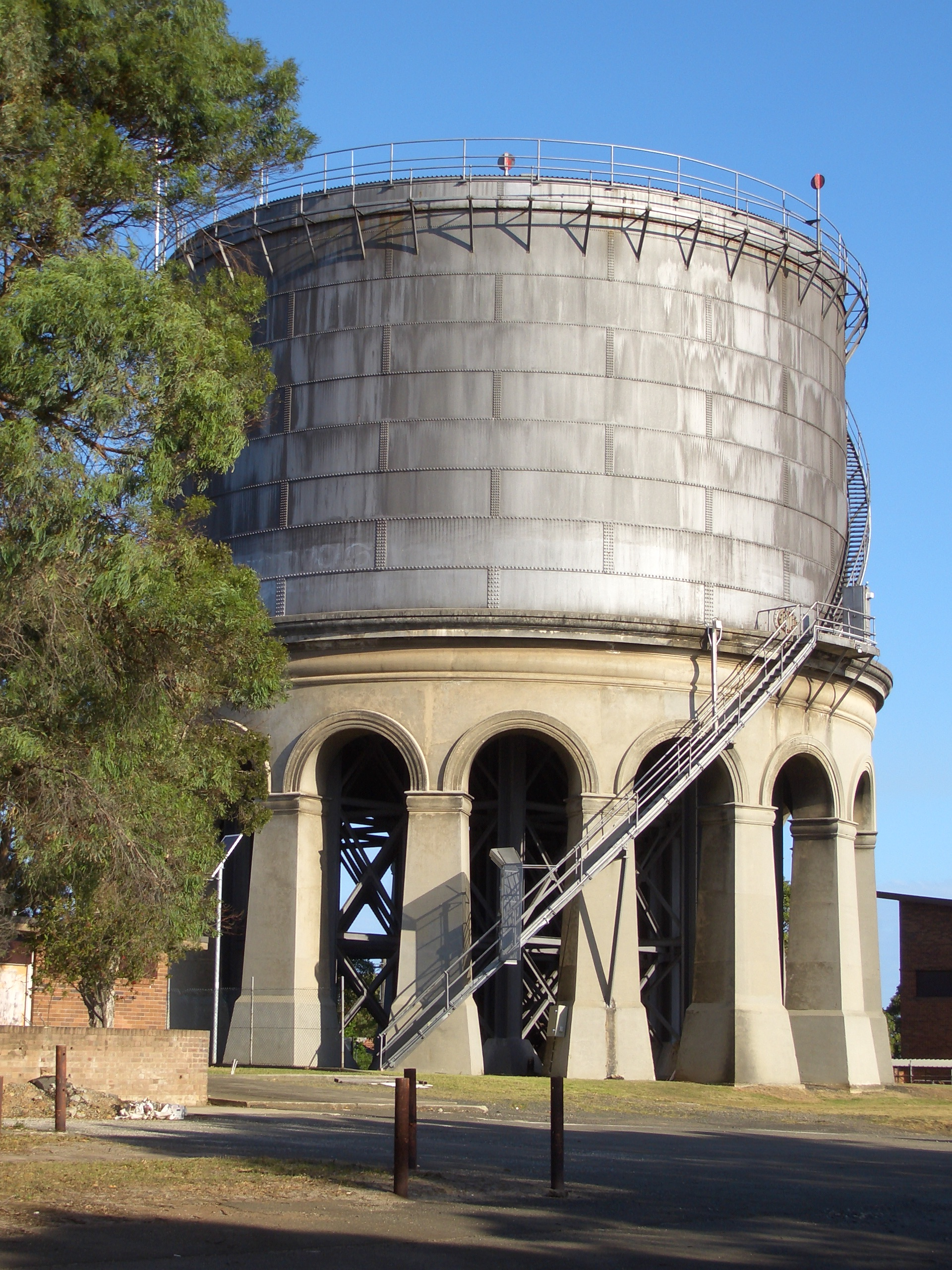
- Interactive map of Ashfield Reservoir

Reservoir
- Total capacity: 1,000,000 imperial gallons (4.55 Ml)
- Maximum water depth: 39 ft 2 in (11.94 m)
- Normal elevation: 220 ft (67 m)

The Ashfield Reservoir is a heritage-listed reservoir located at Holden Street, Ashbury, New South Wales, a suburb of Sydney, Australia. It was designed and built by the Metropolitan Board of Water Supply and Sewerage. It is also known as Ashfield Reservoir (Elevated) (WS 0003) and WS 0003. The property is owned by Sydney Water (State Government). It was added to the New South Wales State Heritage Register on 15 November 2002.

== History ==
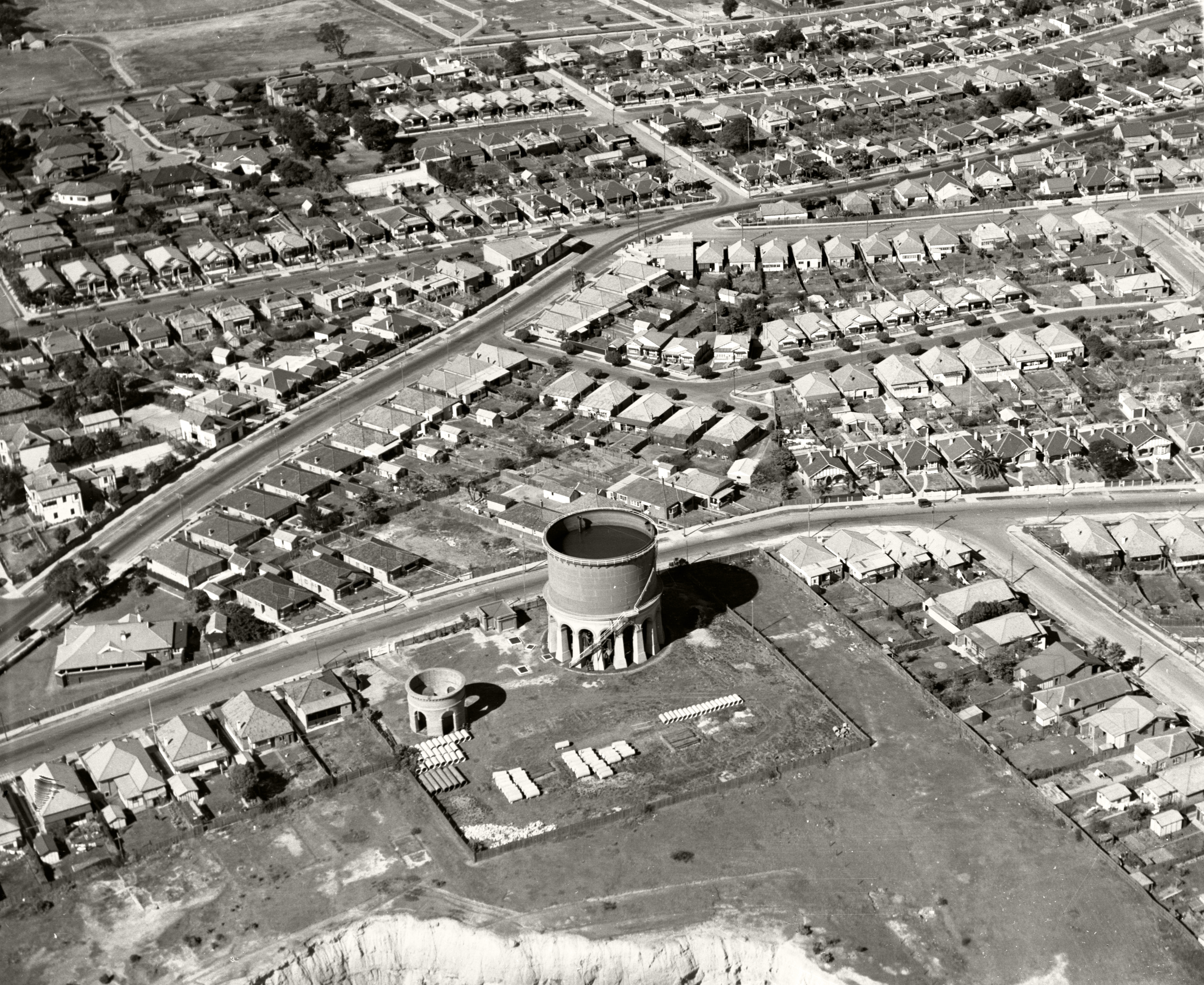
Ashfield Water Tower, 1936

Ashfield Reservoir (Elevated), (WS 3) built in 1912, is one of a group of four similar elevated reservoirs in the Sydney Water system, the others being Bellevue Hill Reservoir (WS 10), 1910, Drummoyne Reservoir (Elevated) (WS 38), 1910, and Penshurst Reservoir (Elevated) (WS 87), 1910.

Petersham Reservoir supplied western Sydney and Illawarra suburbs. A pumping station at Carlton lifted water to Penshurst to supply the higher areas of Kogarah.

Originally, water from Woollahra Reservoir was fed back to Ashfield Reservoir (1888) to supply the higher areas in Inner West. By 1927 an additional main from Potts Hill supplied Ashfield Reservoir. The reservoir is now supplied by the City Tunnel.

== Description ==
Ashfield Reservoir (Elevated), (WS 3) is one of a group of four similar elevated reservoirs in the Sydney Water system, the others being Bellevue Hill Reservoir (WS 10), 1910, Drummoyne Reservoir (Elevated) (WS 38), 1910, and Penshurst Reservoir (Elevated) (WS 87), 1910.

Each reservoir is an elevated cylindrical riveted steel tank, resting on a concrete apron and supported on a steel girder frame. The perimeter of the steel stand has a facade of concrete columns and arches, which forms a decorative, rather than a structural feature. The walkway around the rim of the reservoir is attached to the outside and supported on brackets (decking planks removed).

Standard features include: handrail in tubular steel, davit, access ladder, trigonometric station, inlet and outlet valve chambers.

At its full service level of 260 feet (79.25 m), the reservoir has a capacity of 1,000,000 imp gal (4.5 ML).

The site includes workshops and offices, as well as access to the Pressure Tunnels. Two skid huts are located in the grounds and are a rare survival, demonstrating former working conditions in MWS&DB.

=== Modifications and dates ===
The reservoir has been roofed to safeguard water quality (1960s–1970s).

== Heritage listing ==
As at 10 June 2005, Ashfield Reservoir (Elevated) (WS 3) was one of a small group of four similar elevated reservoirs in the Sydney Water system, the others being Bellevue Hill Reservoir (WS 10), 1910, Drummoyne Reservoir (Elevated) (WS 38), 1910, and Penshurst Reservoir (Elevated) (WS 87), 1910. The group of reservoirs demonstrates a high level of engineering expertise and architectural detail, accommodating both structural requirements and aesthetic qualities.

Ashfield Reservoir was listed on the New South Wales State Heritage Register on 15 November 2002 having satisfied the following criteria.

The place is important in demonstrating the course, or pattern, of cultural or natural history in New South Wales.

Ashfield Reservoir (Elevated) (WS 3) is one of a small group of four similar elevated reservoirs, the others being Bellevue Hill Reservoir (WS 10), 1910, Drummoyne Reservoir (Elevated) (WS 38), 1910, and Penshurst Reservoir (Elevated) (WS 87), 1910.

The place is important in demonstrating aesthetic characteristics and/or a high degree of creative or technical achievement in New South Wales.

The group of reservoirs demonstrate a high level of engineering expertise and architectural detail, accommodating both structural requirements and aesthetic qualities, rare in NSW.

The reservoir is a landmark in the surrounding area.

The place has potential to yield information that will contribute to an understanding of the cultural or natural history of New South Wales.

This reservoir demonstrates the high level of technical expertise available to the MWS & DB for reservoir construction at the time.

The place possesses uncommon, rare or endangered aspects of the cultural or natural history of New South Wales.

This reservoir is one of four riveted steel elevated reservoirs on a steel girder stand with concrete surround in the SWC system, rarer still because of the high level of architectural detailing. The "skid huts" are a rare survival.

The place is important in demonstrating the principal characteristics of a class of cultural or natural places/environments in New South Wales.

The riveted steel tank was common technology for surface reservoirs, but was extremely rare when combined with an elevated steel frame with concrete apron.

== See also ==
- List of dams and reservoirs in New South Wales
- Sydney Water
- Bankstown Reservoir, structure with similar design
