= Bankstown Reservoir =

Water tower in Bankstown, Sydney, NSW

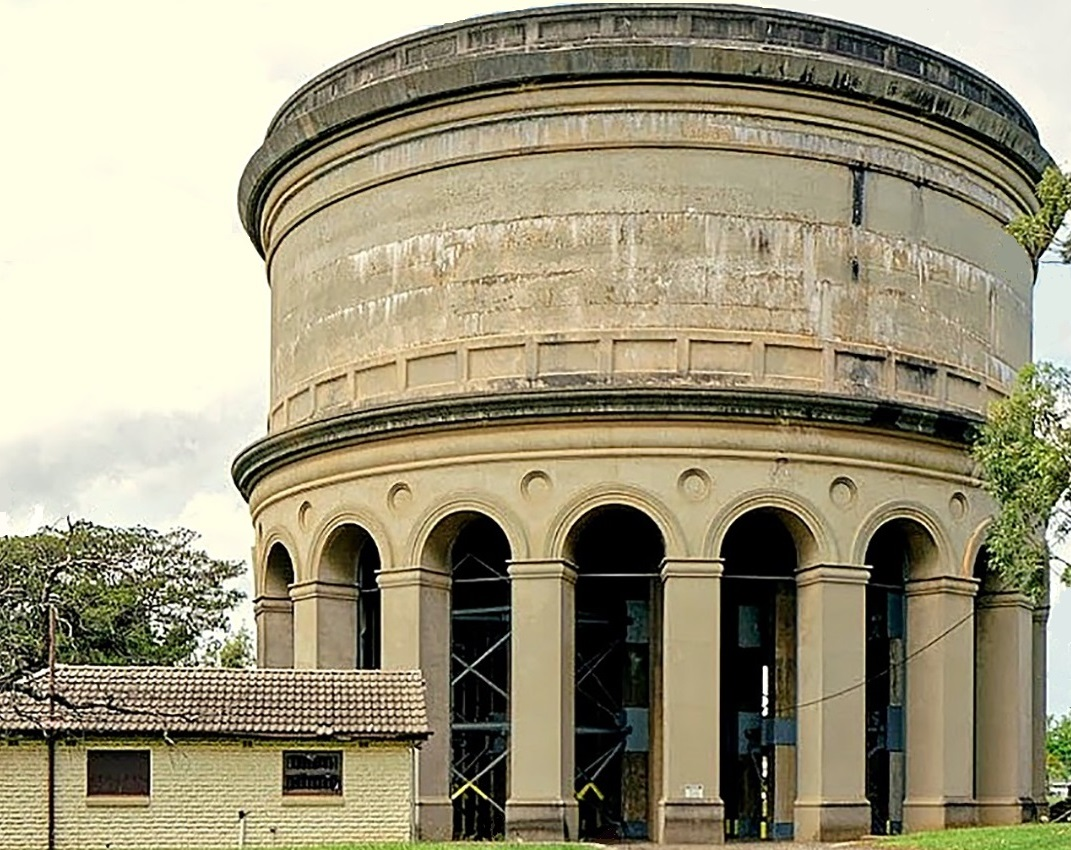
- The pillared water tower
- Interactive map of Bankstown Reservoir
- 33°54′19.78″S 151°02′22.74″E
- Location: 300 Hume Highway, Bankstown, New South Wales

History
- Built: 1920; 106 years ago
- Built for: Metropolitan Board of Water and Sewerage, Sydney

Site notes
- Elevation: 20 metres (66 feet) AGL
- Architect(s): Metropolitan Board of Water Supply and Sewerage
- Architectural styles: Federation Free Classical; Romanesque revival
- Governing body: City of Canterbury-Bankstown

New South Wales Heritage Register
- Official name: Bankstown Reservoir
- Type: Built
- Designated: 18 November 1999
- Reference no.: 01316

Bankstown Reservoir is a heritage-protected water tower and a local landmark situated in the Sydney suburb of Bankstown, New South Wales, Australia. Located 22 kilometres (14 mi) west of Sydney CBD, the reservoir is elevated and was built on reinforced concrete piers, which is one of the oldest of this type that is still in use.

The reservoir features various decorative attributes, plastered by hand, which lack in other functional reservoirs. Established in 1920, the reservoir serves a large area of South-Western Sydney. At the time of its construction in 1918, the reservoir was the largest elevated reinforced concrete reservoir in Australia.

== History ==
In 1826, the reservoir was once a hanging site for bushrangers. Patrick Sullivan and James Moran, both members of Sullivan's gang, were hanged at the site on 18 October 1826 after creating a stir in the Bathurst district. The site on which the Reservoir sits may be connected with the earliest period of Bankstown's European settlement, transport routes, the bushrangers which traversed Liverpool Road and the appearance and carrying out of law and order in the district.

=== Construction ===
Construction of Bankstown Reservoir began in October 1918. The reservoir was built to meliorate the pressure on Ashfield Reservoir and obviate pumping from Ryde. In November 1918, the cornerstone for the piers were unveiled in stiff clay to an unfaltering shale foundation, to an average depth of 2.7 metres (9 feet). The concrete for the reservoir was made on site, with the sandstone acquired from a quarry at Potts Hill.

Power was administered by a portable steam engine. The rendering was made by ornamental exterior plastering and waterproofing of the interior of tank by cement gun. Hand rendering began in February 1920. Extra adjustments to the reservoir include the aluminium roof built in 1962 to preserve water quality. It is likely that the concrete walkway was removed or covered by the roof.

After its completion, elevated reservoirs built in reinforced concrete became common until the 1950s, with one similar tower established in the 1930s in Padstow Heights.

== Design ==
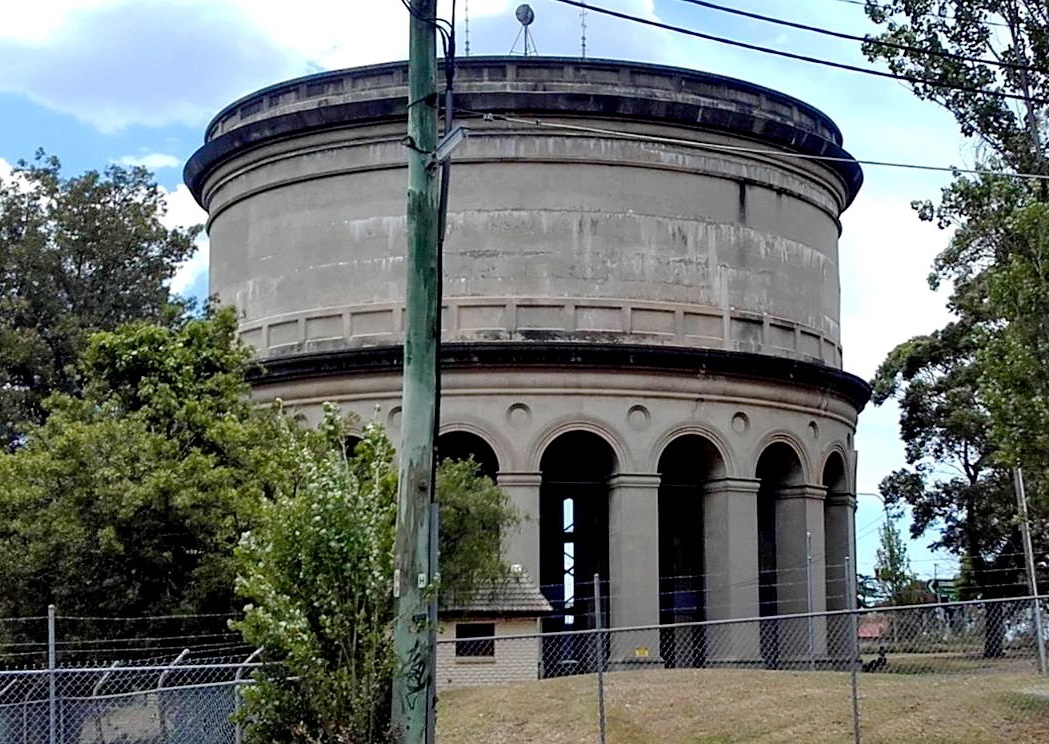
The reservoir from another angle

Bankstown reservoir is built of reinforced concrete and contains a circular water tank. Being akin to a rotunda, it is backed up by 36 strengthened concrete pillars and decorative arches which encircle the establishment. The inward columns are assembled of reinforced concrete while the outer ones consist of plain concrete. Construction aggregate was used for the concrete in the elevated tank and its columns and sandstone conglomeration for the bowed encirclement and ground foundations at the bottom. Instead of a handrail at the top, the reservoir has a concrete rectangular paneled parapet wall.

The tower's arches have a moulding and a circular pattern above each column, with the base of the tank having moulded apron with rectangular panels above. Furthermore, the structure was restrengthened to abide to the earthquake code in 2009. The design of Bankstown Reservoir exemplifies the Victorian and neoclassical architectural of the early 20th century. Its structure is mostly intact and has sustained minor alterations thus retaining its integrity. The reservoir has been roofed to safeguard water quality in the 1960s-1970s. The reservoir is surrounded by brush box, coral tree, poplar and fig trees.

The reservoir is renowned for being the first concrete reservoir to be elevated on concrete piers. Sydney Water Heritage Program leader Phil Bennett stated the Bankstown reservoir has "the highest level of heritage protection because it is the oldest of the class of elevated reinforced concrete reservoirs". Mr Bennett concluded, “It’s quite decorative so it has aesthetic value and it sits very prominently on a hill top and it can be seen for miles, so it has landmark values”. The reservoir has a foot bridge to a walkway on the top of the water tower, passing through the centre of the tank. The tower's rooftop, being 86 metres (282 feet) above sea level, provides panoramic views of the Sydney skyline and Greater Western Sydney area.

=== Proposed developments ===
In 2015, it was proposed by Bankstown City Council and Sydney Water for the tower to be ornamented with decorative lights from sunset to sunrise, akin to those displayed in Vivid Sydney. Bankstown councillor Naji Najjar's vision was to turn the tower into a tourist attraction that could rival Coffs Harbour's Big Banana and Goulburn's Big Merino, stating "I believe it is important that Bankstown City Council, together with Sydney Water, take the opportunity to promote this icon of our city".

As part of Cr Najjar's plan, the area would also be embellished with fencing, landscaping and Australian native gardens, with interpretative signage, including a stone monument revealing the site's history. He concludes, "The lighting could have themes for various charity and community events and awareness campaigns". The council would eventually write to the State Government and await approval.

== Supply ==
With its capacity of 4.4 ML (970,000 imp gal; 1,200,000 US gal) and water depth of 8.7 metres (29 feet), Bankstown Reservoir supplies drinking water to households as far west as Villawood and Condell Park in the southwest, Croydon in the east, and Auburn and North Strathfield in the north.

== Access ==
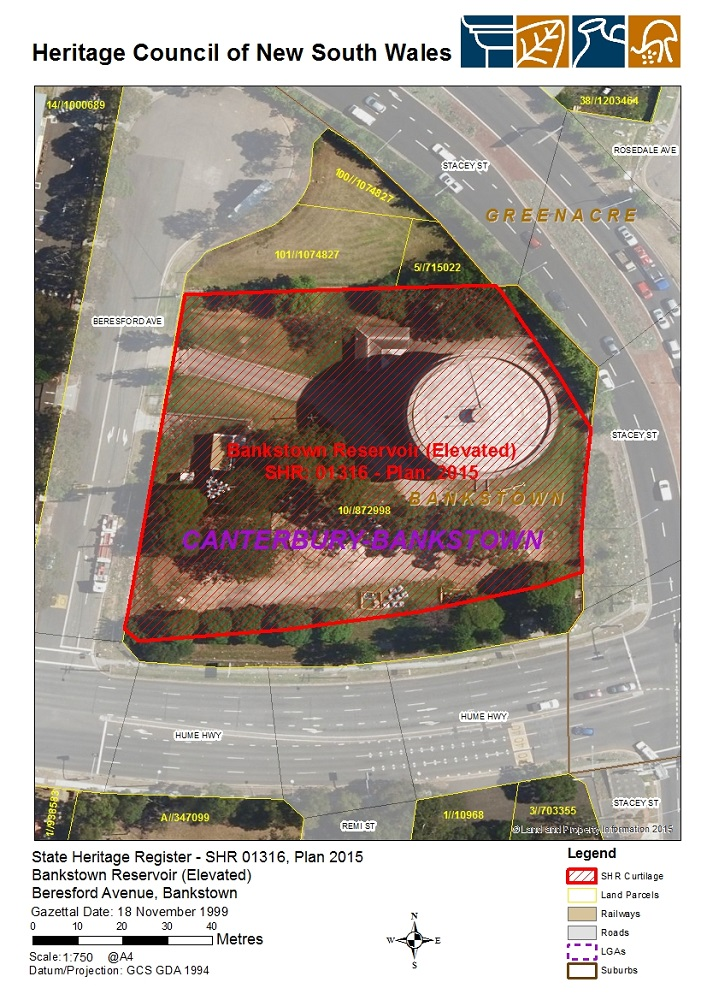
Heritage boundaries

The reservoir is situated on the corner of Hume Highway and Stacey Street in the northeastern periphery of Bankstown, bordering Greenacre. However though, the main entry to the water tower is from Beresford Avenue, which is a dead end street accessed from Hume Hwy.

== Heritage register ==
The reservoir was listed on the New South Wales State Heritage Register as a site of State significance on 18 November 1999 with the following citation:

Bankstown Elevated Reservoir has a considerable level of state heritage significance as a representative example of a common reservoir design strongly favoured by Board engineers during the early period of the twentieth century. It is the oldest elevated reservoir constructed in reinforced concrete that is still in use. At the time of its construction it was the largest elevated reinforced concrete reservoir, and symbolised the technological advancements of the time. It displays decorative and formal architectural qualities and shows a high level of workmanship and technical accomplishment. It has several features which distinguish it from other elevated reservoirs of this type, including; the central concrete access tower; the concrete footbridge connecting the tower to the walkway and which encircles the perimeter of the top bank; and the mercury U-shaped tube depth gauge. It is currently still in active service and makes a positive contribution to the streetscape of Bankstown.

== See also ==
- Paddington Reservoir
- Balmain Reservoir
- Boothtown Aqueduct
- Prospect Hill Reservoir
