= Bunyip =

Mythical creature from Aboriginal mythology

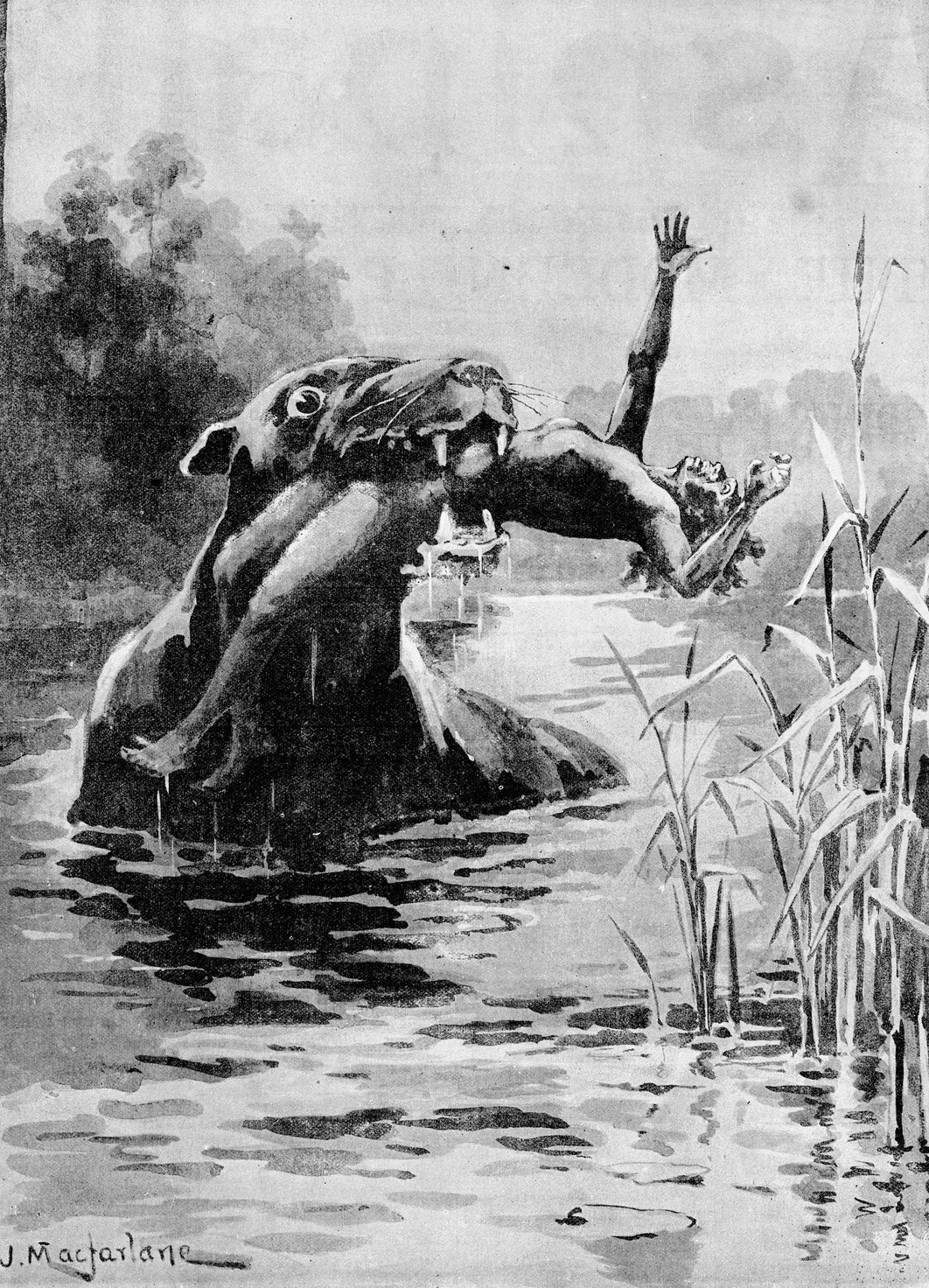
Illustration of a bunyip by J. Macfarlane (1890)

The bunyip is a legendary creature from the aboriginal mythology of southeastern Australia, said to lurk in swamps, billabongs, creeks, riverbeds and waterholes.

== Etymology ==
The origin of the word bunyip has been traced to the Wemba-Wemba or Wergaia language of the Aboriginal people of Victoria, in South-Eastern Australia.

The word bunyip is usually translated by Aboriginal Australians today as devil or evil spirit. This modern translation may not accurately represent the role of the bunyip in pre-contact Aboriginal mythology or its possible origins before written accounts were made. Some modern sources allude to a linguistic connection between the bunyip and Bunjil, "a mythic 'Great Man' who made the mountains, rivers, man, and all the animals".

The word bahnyip first appeared in the Sydney Gazette in 1812. It was used by James Ives to describe "a large black animal like a seal, with a terrible voice which creates terror among the blacks".

== Distribution ==
The bunyip is part of traditional Aboriginal beliefs and stories throughout Australia, while its name varies according to tribal nomenclature. In his 2001 book Robert Holden identified at least nine regional variations of the creature known as the bunyip across Aboriginal Australia.

== Characteristics ==
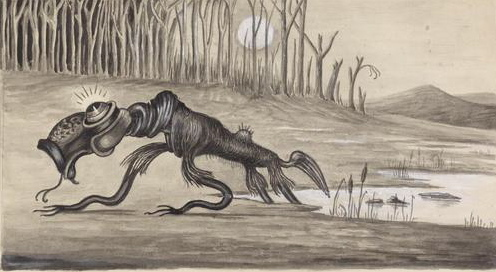
Bunyip (1935), by Gerald Markham Lewis, from the National Library of Australia digital collections, demonstrates the variety in descriptions of the legendary creature.

The bunyip has been described as amphibious, almost entirely aquatic (there are no reports of the creature being sighted on land), (Note: Amphibious, but never having been witnessed going ashore on the riverbank, according to South Australian Institute 1901, p. 101.) inhabiting lakes, rivers, swamps, lagoons, billabongs, creeks, waterholes, (Note: Crawford, Eugénie (1972). A Bunyip Close Behind Me. quoted in Seal 1999, p. 15 and Holden 2001, p. 60. The informant of the childhood experience in the 1890s is not Crawford (as misattributed by Holden) but her mother, Eugénie Louise McNeil (1886–1983).) sometimes "particular waterholes in the riverbeds".

Physical descriptions of bunyips vary widely. George French Angus may have collected a description of a bunyip in his account of a "water spirit" from the Moorundi people of the Murray River before 1847, stating it is "much dreaded by them ... It inhabits the Murray; but ... they have some difficulty describing it. Its most usual form ... is said to be that of an enormous starfish." The Challicum bunyip, an outline image of a bunyip carved by Aboriginal people into the bank of Fiery Creek, near Ararat, Victoria, was first recorded by The Australasian newspaper in 1851. According to the report, the bunyip had been speared after killing an Aboriginal man. Antiquarian Reynell Johns claimed that until the mid-1850s, Aboriginal people made a "habit of visiting the place annually and retracing the outlines of the figure [of the bunyip] which is about 11 paces long and 4 paces in extreme breadth". The outline image no longer exists. Robert Brough Smyth's Aborigines of Victoria (1878) devoted ten pages to the bunyip, but concluded "in truth little is known among the blacks respecting its form, covering or habits; they appear to have been in such dread of it as to have been unable to take note of its characteristics." Eugénie Louise McNeil recalled from her childhood memory in the 1890s that the bunyip supposedly had a snout like an owl ("a Mopoke"), and was probably a nocturnal creature by her estimation.

The bunyips presumably seen by witnesses, according to their descriptions, most commonly fit one of two categories: 60% of sightings resemble seals or swimming dogs and 20% of sightings are of long-necked creatures with small heads; the remaining descriptions are ambiguous beyond categorisation. The seal-dog variety is most often described as being between 4 and 6 feet long with a shaggy black or brown coat. According to reports, these bunyips have round heads resembling a bulldog, prominent ears, no tail, and whiskers like a seal or otter. The long-necked variety is allegedly between 5 and 15 feet long and is said to have black or brown fur, large ears, small tusks, a head like a horse or emu, an elongated, maned neck about three feet long and with many folds of skin, and a horse-like tail. The bunyip has been described by natives as amphibious, nocturnal, reclusive and inhabiting lakes, rivers and swamps. Bunyips, according to Aboriginal mythology, can swim swiftly with fins or flippers, have a loud, roaring call and feed on crayfish, though some legends portray them as bloodthirsty predators of humans, particularly women and children. As a result Aboriginal People purposely avoided unfamiliar bodies of water lest there were bunyips lurking in the depths. Bunyip eggs are allegedly laid in platypus nests, making them brood parasites.

The bunyip appears in Ngarrindjeri dreaming as a water spirit called the Mulyawonk, which would get anyone who took more than their fair share of fish from the waterways, or take children if they got too close to the water. The stories taught practical means of ensuring long-term survival for the Ngarrindjeri, embodying care for country and its people.

== Debate over origins ==
There have been various attempts to understand and explain the origins of the bunyip as a physical entity over the past 150 years. Writing in 1933, Charles Fenner suggested that it was likely that the "actual origin of the bunyip myth lies in the fact that from time to time seals have made their way up the Murray and Darling (Rivers)". He provided examples of seals found as far inland as Overland Corner, Loxton, and Conargo and reminded readers that "the smooth fur, prominent 'apricot' eyes, and the bellowing cry are characteristic of the seal", especially southern elephant seals and leopard seals.

Another suggestion is that the bunyip may be a folk memory of extinct Australian marsupials such as the Diprotodon, Zygomaturus, Nototherium, Palorchestes or Thylacoleo. This connection was first formally made by Dr George Bennett of the Australian Museum in 1871. In the early 1990s, palaeontologist Pat Vickers-Rich and geologist Neil Archbold also cautiously suggested that Aboriginal legends "perhaps had stemmed from an acquaintance with prehistoric bones or even living prehistoric animals themselves ... When confronted with the remains of some of the now extinct Australian marsupials, Aborigines would often identify them as the bunyip." They also note that "legends about the mihirung paringmal of western Victorian Aborigines ... may allude to the ... extinct giant birds the Dromornithidae".

In a 2017 Australian Birdlife article, Karl Brandt suggested Aboriginal encounters with the southern cassowary inspired the myth. According to the first written description of the bunyip from 1845, the creature laid pale blue eggs of immense size, possessed deadly claws, powerful hind legs, a brightly coloured chest, and an emu-like head, characteristics shared with the Australian cassowary. As the creature's bill was described as having serrated projections, each "like the bone of the stingray", this bunyip was associated with the indigenous people of Far North Queensland, renowned for their spears tipped with stingray barbs and their proximity to the cassowary's Australian range.

Another association to the bunyip is the shy Australasian bittern (Botaurus poiciloptilus). During the breeding season, the male call of this marsh-dwelling bird is a "low pitched boom"; hence, it is occasionally called the "bunyip bird".

== Early accounts of European settlers ==
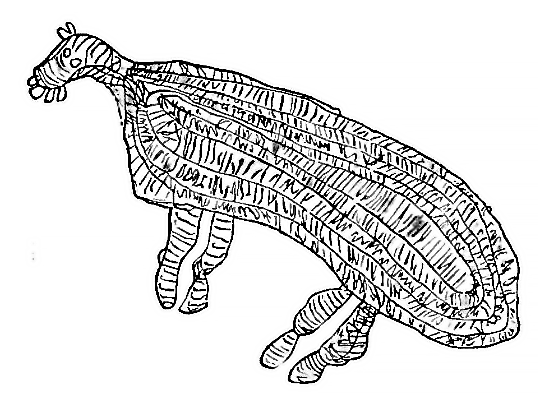
An 1878 illustration of the bunyip from "Aborigines in Victoria".

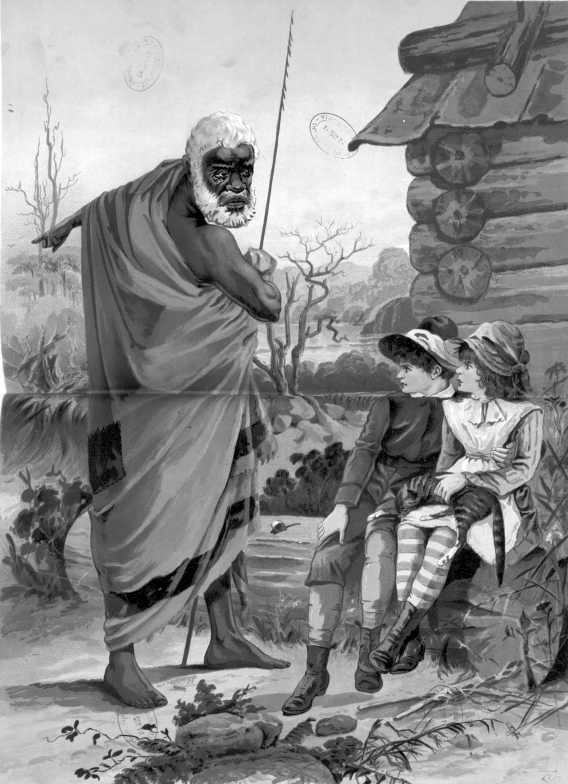
An 1882 illustration of an Aboriginal man telling the story of the bunyip to two white children

During the early settlement of Australia by Europeans, the notion became commonly held that the bunyip was an unknown animal that awaited discovery. Unfamiliar with the sights and sounds of the island continent's peculiar fauna, early Europeans believed that the bunyip described to them was one more strange Australian animal and they sometimes attributed unfamiliar animal calls or cries to it. Scholars suggest also that 19th-century bunyip lore was reinforced by imported European folklore, such as that of the Irish Púca.

A large number of bunyip sightings occurred during the 1840s and 1850s, particularly in the southeastern colonies of Victoria, New South Wales and South Australia, as European settlers extended their reach. The following is not an exhaustive list of accounts:

=== First written use of the word bunyip, 1845 ===
In July 1845, The Geelong Advertiser announced the discovery of fossils found near Geelong, under the headline "Wonderful Discovery of a new Animal". This was a continuation of a story on 'fossil remains' from the previous issue. The newspaper continued, "On the bone being shown to an intelligent black, he at once recognised it as belonging to the bunyip, which he declared he had seen. On being requested to make a drawing of it, he did so without hesitation." The account noted a story of an Aboriginal woman being killed by a bunyip and the "most direct evidence of all" – that of a man named Mumbowran "who showed several deep wounds on his breast made by the claws of the animal".

The account provided this description of the creature:

The Bunyip, then, is represented as uniting the characteristics of a bird and of an alligator. It has a head resembling an emu, with a long bill, at the extremity of which is a transverse projection on each side, with serrated edges like the bone of the stingray. Its body and legs partake of the nature of the alligator. The hind legs are remarkably thick and strong, and the fore legs are much longer, but still of great strength. The extremities are furnished with long claws, but the blacks say its usual method of killing its prey is by hugging it to death. When in the water it swims like a frog, and when on shore it walks on its hind legs with its head erect, in which position it measures twelve or thirteen feet in height.

Shortly after this account appeared, it was repeated in other Australian newspapers. This appears to be the first use of the word bunyip in a written publication.

=== Australian Museum's bunyip of 1847 ===
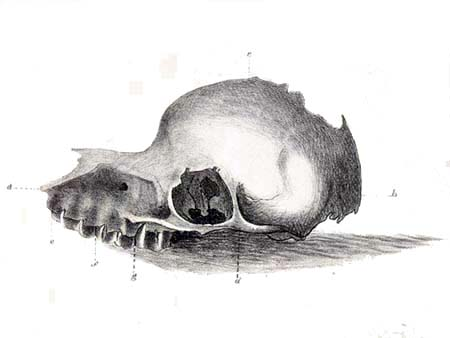
The purported bunyip skull

In January 1846, a peculiar skull was taken by a settler from the banks of Murrumbidgee River near Balranald, New South Wales. Initial reports suggested that it was the skull of something unknown to science. The squatter who found it remarked, "all the natives to whom it was shown called [it] a bunyip". By July 1847, several experts, including W. S. Macleay and Professor Owen, had identified the skull as the deformed foetal skull of a foal or calf. At the same time, the purported bunyip skull was put on display in the Australian Museum (Sydney) for two days. Visitors flocked to see it, and The Sydney Morning Herald reported that many people spoke out about their "bunyip sightings". Reports of this discovery used the phrase 'Kine Pratie' as well as Bunyip. Explorer William Hovell, who examined the skull, also called it a 'katen-pai'.

In March of that year, "a bunyip or an immense Platibus" (Platypus) was sighted "sunning himself on the placid bosom of the Yarra, just opposite the Custom House" in Melbourne. "Immediately a crowd gathered" and three men set off by boat "to secure the stranger" which "disappeared" when they were "about a yard from him".

=== William Buckley's account of bunyips, 1852 ===
Another early written account is attributed to escaped convict William Buckley in his 1852 biography of thirty years living with the Wathaurong people. His 1852 account records "in ... Lake Moodewarri [now Lake Modewarre] as well as in most of the others inland ... is a ... very extraordinary amphibious animal, which the natives call Bunyip." Buckley's account suggests he saw such a creature on several occasions. He adds, "I could never see any part, except the back, which appeared to be covered with feathers of a dusky grey colour. It seemed to be about the size of a full grown calf ... I could never learn from any of the natives that they had seen either the head or tail." Buckley also claimed the creature was common in the Barwon River and cites an example he heard of an Aboriginal woman being killed by one. He emphasized the bunyip was believed to have supernatural powers.

=== Stocqueler's sightings and drawings, 1857 ===
In an article titled, 'The Bunyip', a newspaper reported on the drawings made by Edwin Stocqueler as he travelled on the Murray and Goulburn rivers: 'Amongst the latter drawings we noticed a likeness of the Bunyip, or rather a view of the neck and shoulders of the animal. Mr. Stocqueler informs us that the Bunyip is a large freshwater seal, having two small padules or fins attached to the shoulders, a long swan like neck, a head like a dog, and a curious bag hanging under the jaw, resembling the pouch of the pelican. The animal is covered with hair, like the platypus, and the colour is a glossy black. Mr. Stocqueler saw no less than six of these curious animals at different times; his boat was within thirty feet of one near McGuire's punt on the Goulburn, and he fired at the Bunyip, but did not succeed in capturing him. The smallest appeared to be about five feet in length, and the largest exceeded fifteen feet. The head of the largest was the size of a bullock's head, and three feet out of water. After taking a sketch of the animal, Mr. Stocqueler showed it to several blacks of the Goulburn tribe, who declared that the picture was "Bunyip's brother," meaning a duplicate or likeness of the bunyip. The animals moved against the current, at the rate of about seven miles an hour, and Mr. Stockqueler states that he could have approached close to the specimens he observed, had he not been deterred by the stories of the natives concerning the power and fury of the bunyip, and by the fact that his gun had only a single barrel, and his boat was of a very frail description.'

The description varied across newspaper accounts: 'The great Bunyip question seems likely to be brought to a close, as a Mr. Stocqueler, an artist and gentleman, who has come up the Murray in a small boat, states that he saw one, and was enabled to take a drawing of this "vexed question," but could not succeed in catching him. We have seen the sketch, and it puts us in mind of an hybrid between the water mole and the great sea serpent.' 'Mr. Stocqueler, an artist, and his mother are on an expedition down the Murray, for the purpose of making some faithful sketches of the views on this fine stream, as well as of the creatures frequenting it. I have seen some of their productions, and as they pourtray localities with which I am well acquainted, can pronounce the drawings faithful representations. Mother and son go down the stream in a canoe. The lady paints flowers, &c.; the son devotes himself to choice views on the river's side. One of the drawings represents a singular creature, which the artist is unable to classify. It has the appearance in miniature of the famous sea-serpent, as that animal is described by navigators. Mr. Stocqueler was about twenty-five yards distant from it at first sight as it lay placidly on the water. On being observed, the stranger set-off, working his paddles briskly, and rapidly disappeared. Captain Cadell has tried to solve the mystery, but is not yet satisfied as to what the animal really is. Mr. Stocqueler states that there were about two feet of it above water when he first saw it, and he estimated its length at from five to six feet. The worthy Captain says, that unless the creature is the "Musk Drake" (so called from giving off a very strong odour of musk), he cannot account for the novelty.'

Stocqueler disputed the newspaper descriptions in a letter; stating that he never called the animal a bunyip, it did not have a swan like neck, and he never said anything about the size of the animal as he never saw the whole body. He went on to write that all would be revealed in his diorama as an 'almost life size portrait of the beast' would be included. The diorama took him four years to paint and was reputed to be a mile (1.6 km) long and made of 70 individual pictures. The diorama has long since disappeared and may no longer exist.

== Figure of speech and eponymy ==
By the 1850s, bunyip was also used as a "synonym for impostor, pretender, humbug and the like", although this use of the word is now obsolete in Australian English. The term bunyip aristocracy was first coined in 1853 to describe Australians aspiring to be aristocrats. In the early 1990s, Prime Minister Paul Keating used this term to describe members of the conservative Liberal Party of Australia opposition.

The word bunyip can still be found in a number of Australian contexts, including place names such as the Bunyip River (which flows into Westernport Bay in southern Victoria) and the town of Bunyip, Victoria.

== In popular culture and fiction ==
- The Bunyip is a local weekly newspaper published in the town of Gawler, South Australia. First published as a pamphlet by the Gawler Humbug Society in 1863, the name was chosen because "the Bunyip is the true type of Australian Humbug!"
- A private residence built in the 1860s in Clifton Hill, Victoria, was redeveloped in the 1970s as the "House of the Gentle Bunyip", an ecumenical Christian community, the first of several such initiatives.

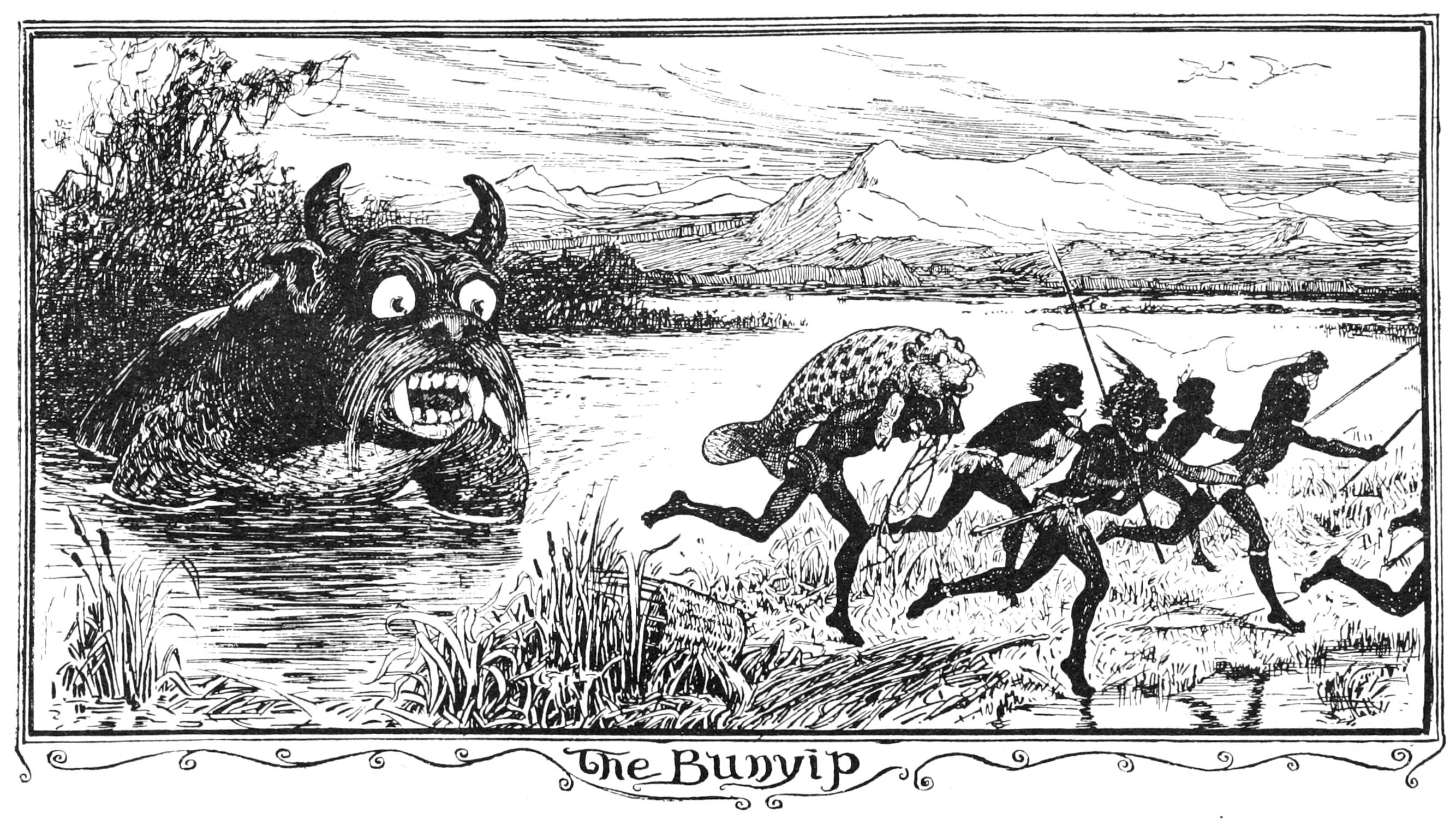
Illustration by H. J. Ford accompanying the tale "The Bunyip" in the Brown Fairy Book

Numerous tales of the bunyip in written literature appeared in the 19th and early 20th centuries. One of the earliest known is a story in Andrew Lang's The Brown Fairy Book (1904), adapted from a tale collected and published in the Journal of the Anthropological Institute in 1899.

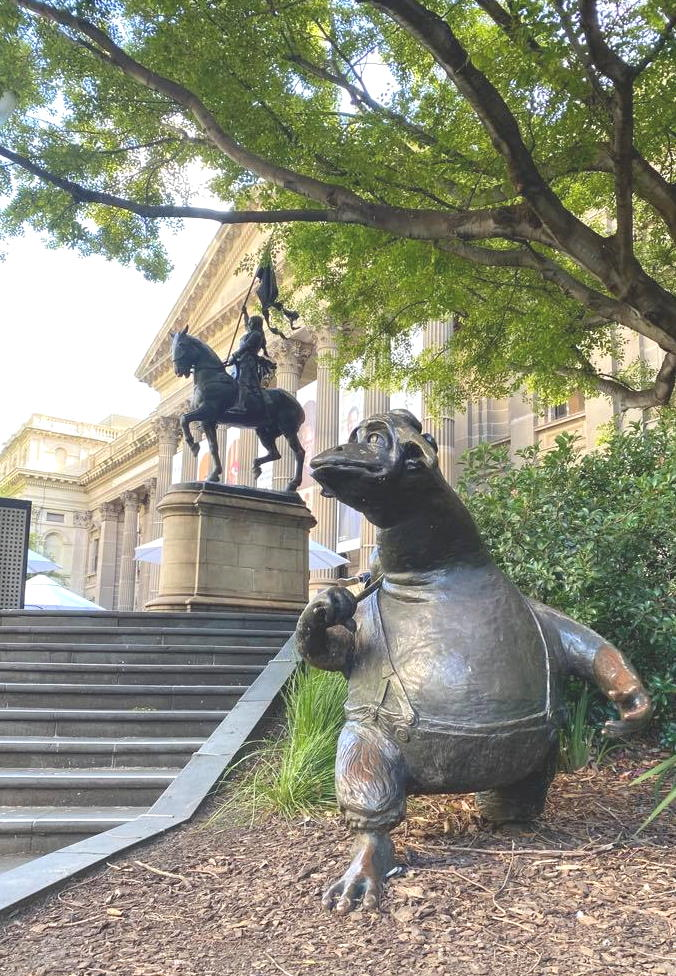
Bronze statue of The Bunyip by Ron Brooks (born 1947), illustrator and sculptor. From The Bunyip of Berkeley's Creek, by Jenny Wagner (born 1939). Forecourt of the State Library of Victoria.

- The character Alexander Bunyip, created by children's author and illustrator Michael Salmon, first appeared in print in The Monster That Ate Canberra (1972). Salmon featured the Bunyip character in many other books and adapted his work as a live-action television series, Alexander Bunyip's Billabong. A statue of Alexander Bunyip by Anne Ross, called A Is for Alexander, B Is for Bunyip, C Is for Canberra, was commissioned by the ACT Government for Gungahlin's $3.8 million town park and installed in front of the Gungahlin Library in 2011.
- The ragtime musical comedy The Bunyip or The Enchantment of Fairy Princess Wattle Blossom by Ella Palzier Campbell (AKA Ella Airlie) toured nine venues in three states for a year in 1916 with the Fuller Brothers theatre circuit. Music was supplied by a number of Australian stage personalities including Vince Courtney, Herbert De Pinna, Fred Monument and James Kendis.

The Australian tourism boom of the 1970s brought a renewed interest in bunyip mythology.

- (1972) A coin-operated bunyip was built by Dennis Newell at Murray Bridge, South Australia, at Sturt Reserve on the town's riverfront.
- Jenny Wagner published a children's picture book, The Bunyip of Berkeley's Creek (1973).
- (1977) The film Dot and the Kangaroo contains a song "The Bunyip (Bunyip Moon)". The bunyip was the subject of Dot and the Smugglers where the title character, Dot, and her animal friends foil a circus-ringmaster's plan to capture a bunyip. The bunyip turns out to be a gentle, shy creature.
- (1982) Graham Jenkin wrote a children's picture book, The Ballad of the Blue Lake Bunyip
- (2016) The independent Australian film Red Billabong was released in 2016. It tells of two estranged brothers who find themselves stalked by the Bunyip.

Bunyip stories have also been published outside Australia.

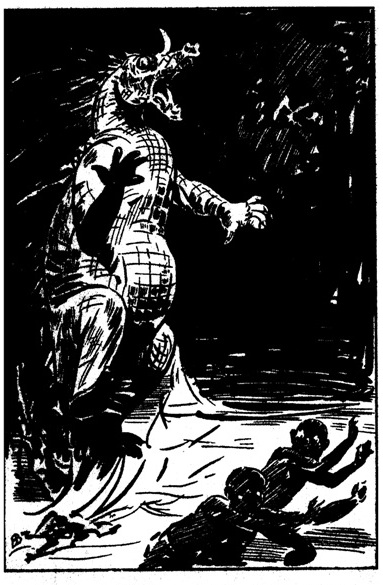
Bunyip as presented in Bibhutibhushan Bandyopadhyay's Chander Pahar. Art by Jukto Binir Basu.

- (1937) Bibhutibhushan Bandyopadhyay wrote a Bengali novel Chander Pahar (Mountain of the Moon) that included an account of a bunyip. The novel was adapted as a film of the same name, released in late 2013. The bunyip was portrayed as the primary threat to the treasure seekers in the wilderness of the Richtersveld mountains in southern Africa. In the novel, the bunyip is described as a three-toed ape-like hominid.
- From 1954 to 1966, Bertie the Bunyip was the lead puppet character on a popular children's series on Channel 3 in Philadelphia, Pennsylvania.
- (1992) The roleplaying game, Werewolf: The Apocalypse, appropriates the Bunyip legend, having the Bunyip actually be a tribe of Australian native Garou, or werewolves. However, they are not playable in the game as, according to the game's lore, they were driven to extinction by the European werewolves during the colonisation of Australia.

The Bunyip has been featured in films as well.

In the 21st century, the bunyip has been featured in works around the world.

- (2009) A character named Bruce Bunyip appears in the children's book The Neddiad by American Daniel Pinkwater. He is initially described as "big and swarthy, and had tiny eyes, a scowl and his eyebrows grew together" and later says he is a monster.
- (2010) Bunyips appear in Naomi Novik's fantasy novel Tongues of Serpents, where they are depicted as relatives of dragons that have adapted to the extreme conditions of the Outback.

== See also ==
- Bunyip animatronic, a animatronic based on the Bunyip located in Murray Bridge, South Australia
- Drop bear, a fictitious Australian mammal
- Min Min light, a natural phenomenon that may have influenced Australian Aboriginal mythology
- Nargun, a living stone creature from Australian Aboriginal mythology
- Rainbow Serpent, a common motif in the art and mythology of Aboriginal Australia
- Underwater panther, a similar North American creature of legend
- Whowie, a giant frog-headed river monster from Australian Aboriginal mythology
- Yara-ma-yha-who, a vampiric creature from Australian Aboriginal mythology
- P. A. Yeomans, inventor of the Bunyip Slipper Imp, a plough for developing watersheds
- Yowie, or Wowee, a "BigFoot" style of creature that has its origins in Australian Aboriginal mythology

== Sources ==
- Clarke, Philip A. (2018). "Ch. 3. Water spirit beings". In Cahir, Fred; Clark, Ian D.; Clarke, Philip A. (eds.). Aboriginal Biocultural Knowledge in South-eastern Australia: Perspectives of Early Colonists. CSIRO Publishing. pp. 35–54. ISBN 9781486306121.
- Fenner, Charles (1933). Bunyips and Billabongs. Sydney: Angus and Robertson. OCLC 10292063.
- Holden, Robert; Holden, Nicholas (2001). Bunyips: Australia's folklore of fear. National Library of Australia. ISBN 0642107327.
- South Australian Institute (18 January 1901). "Notes on Natural History: The Bunyip". South Australian Institutes' Journal. 1 (6): 100–107.
