= Music of Australia =

The music of Australia has an extensive history made of music societies. Indigenous Australian music forms a significant part of the unique heritage of a 40,000- to 60,000-year history which produced the iconic didgeridoo. Contemporary fusions of indigenous and Western styles are exemplified in the works of Yothu Yindi, No Fixed Address, Geoffrey Gurrumul Yunupingu and Christine Anu, and mark distinctly Australian contributions to world music.

Australian music's early western history, was a collection of British colonies, Australian folk music and bush ballads, with songs such as "Waltzing Matilda" and The Wild Colonial Boy heavily influenced by Anglo-Celtic traditions, Indeed, many bush ballads are based on the works of national poets Henry Lawson and Banjo Patterson.

Contemporary Australian music ranges across a broad spectrum with trends often concurrent with those of the US, the UK, and similar nations—notably in the Australian rock and Australian country music genres. Tastes have diversified along with post–World War II multicultural immigration to Australia, whilst classical music derives from European influences.

In the 1990s and early 2000s, the most recent and possibly only original genre of music to emerge from Australia outside of indigenous music came from Newcastle and Sydney as a genre known as Breakcore.

== Indigenous music ==
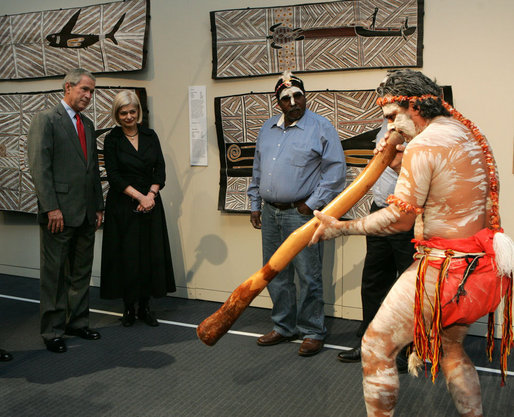
American President George W. Bush observes a performance of Aboriginal song and dance during a 2007 visit to the Australian National Maritime Museum in Sydney with traditional instrument, the didgeridoo.

Indigenous Australian music refers to the music of Aboriginals and Torres Strait Islanders. Music forms an integral part of the social, cultural and ceremonial observances of these peoples, and has been so for over 60,000 years. Traditional indigenous music is best characterised by the didgeridoo, the best-known instrument, which is considered by some to be the world's oldest. Archaeological studies of rock art in the Northern Territory suggest people of the Kakadu region were playing the instrument 15,000 years ago.

Contemporary indigenous Australian music has covered numerous styles, including rock and roll, country, hip-hop, and reggae.

=== Artists ===
Jimmy Little is regarded as the first Aboriginal performer to achieve mainstream success, with his debut 1964 song "The Royal Telephone" highly popular and successful. In 2005, Little was presented with an honorary doctorate in music by the University of Sydney. Despite the popularity of some of his work, Little failed to launch indigenous music in the country—from the 1970s onwards, groups such as Coloured Stone, Warumpi Band, and No Fixed Address helped improve the image of the genre. It was Yothu Yindi that brought indigenous music to the mainstream, with their 1991 song "Treaty", from the album Tribal Voice, becoming a hit. It reached No. 11 on the ARIA Singles Chart. The band's performances were based on the traditional Yolngu dance, and embodied a sharing of culture. The success of Yothu Yindi—winners of eight ARIA Awards—was followed in by Kev Carmody, Tiddas, Archie Roach and Christine Anu, and numerous other indigenous Australian musicians.

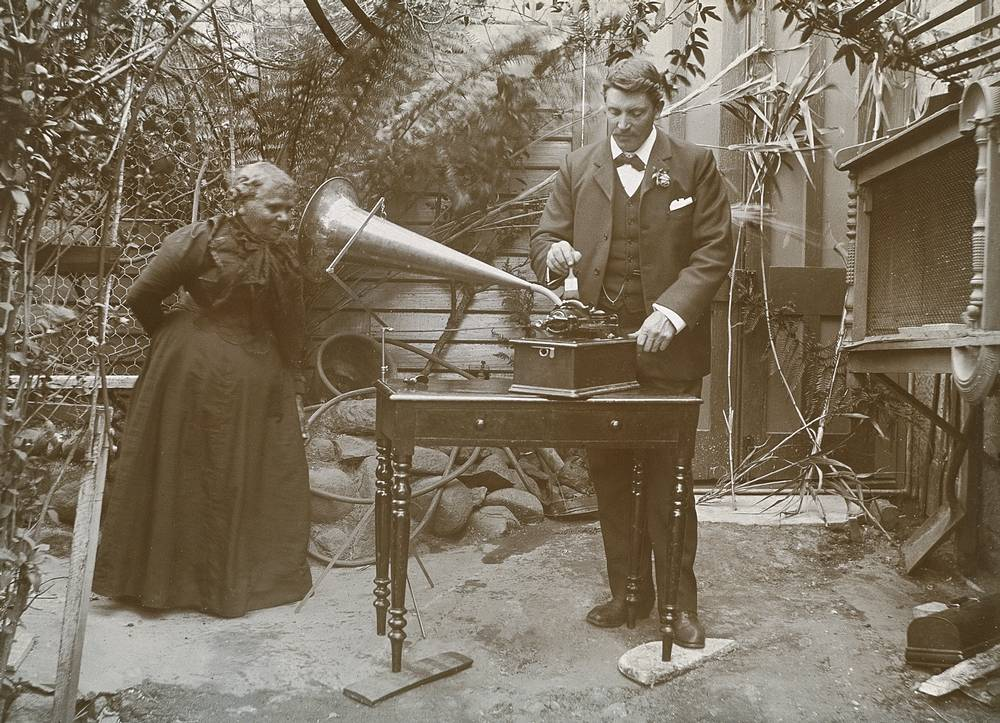
Horace Watson recording the songs of Fanny Cochrane Smith, considered to be the last fluent speaker of a Tasmanian language, 1903. Folk-singer Bruce Watson, descendant of Watson, composed a song about this picture and later performed it with singer Ronnie Summers, a descendant of Smith.

Indigenous Australian music is unique, as it dates back more than 60,000 years to the prehistory of Australia and continues the ancient songlines through contemporary artists as diverse as: David Dahwurr Hudson, Warumpi Band, Wild Water, Saltwater Band, Nabarlek, Nokturnl, the Pigram Brothers, Blekbala Mujik, and Ruby Hunter.

In 2024, Indigenous Australian artists have achieved incredible success at home and abroad, with chart-toppers like The Kid Laroi, Thelma Plum and Baker Boy (who raps and sings in both English and Yolngu) dominating. In 2022, 10 tracks in the Triple J listener-voted Hottest 100 countdown featured Indigenous representation, which was a new record. Arnhem Land's King Stingray was responsible for four of those entries alone.

== Folk music ==
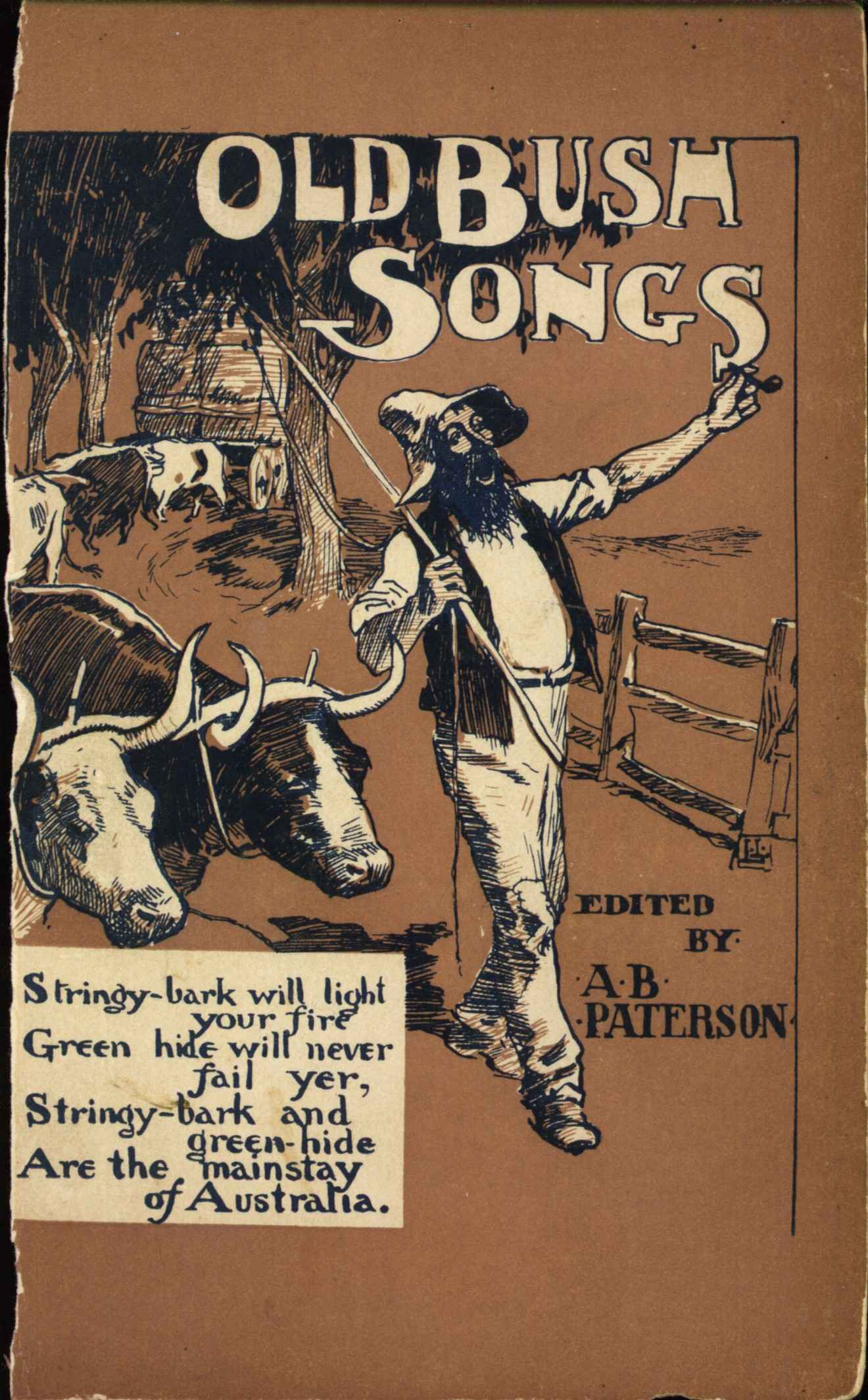
Cover to Banjo Paterson's seminal 1905 collection of bush ballads, titled The Old Bush Songs

For much of its history, Australia's bush music belonged to an oral and folkloric tradition, and was only later published in print in volumes such as Banjo Paterson's Old Bush Songs, in the 1890s. The distinctive themes and origins of Australia's "bush music" or "bush band music" can be traced to the songs sung by the convicts who were sent to Australia during the early period of the British colonisation, beginning in 1788. Early Australian ballads sing of the harsh ways of life of the epoch and of such people and events as bushrangers, swagmen, drovers, stockmen and shearers. Convict and bushranger verses often railed against government tyranny. Classic bush songs on such themes include: "The Wild Colonial Boy", "Click Go the Shears", "The Drover's Dream", "The Queensland Drover", "The Dying Stockman" and "Moreton Bay".

Later themes which endure to the present include the experiences of war, of droughts and flooding rains, of Aboriginality and of the railways and trucking routes which link Australia's vast distances. Isolation and loneliness of life in the Australian bush have been another theme. "Waltzing Matilda", often regarded as Australia's unofficial national anthem, is a quintessential Australian folk song, influenced by Celtic folk ballads. Country and folk artists such as Tex Morton, Slim Dusty, Rolf Harris, the Bushwackers, John Williamson, and John Schumann of the band Redgum have continued to record and popularise the old bush ballads of Australia through the 20th and into the 21st century – and contemporary artists including Sara Storer and Lee Kernaghan draw heavily on this heritage.

Australia has a unique tradition of folk music, with origins in both the indigenous music traditions of the original Australian inhabitants, as well as the introduced folk music (including sea shanties) of 18th and 19th century Europe. Celtic, English, German and Scandinavian folk traditions predominated in this first wave of European immigrant music. The Australian tradition is, in this sense, related to the traditions of other countries with similar ethnic, historical and political origins, such as New Zealand, Canada, and the United States. The Australian indigenous tradition brought to this mix of novel elements, including new instruments, some of which are now internationally familiar, such as the didgeridoo of Northern Australia. A number of British singers have spent periods in Australia and have included Australian material in their repertoires, e.g. A. L. Lloyd, Martin Wyndham-Read and Eric Bogle.

=== Folk revival ===
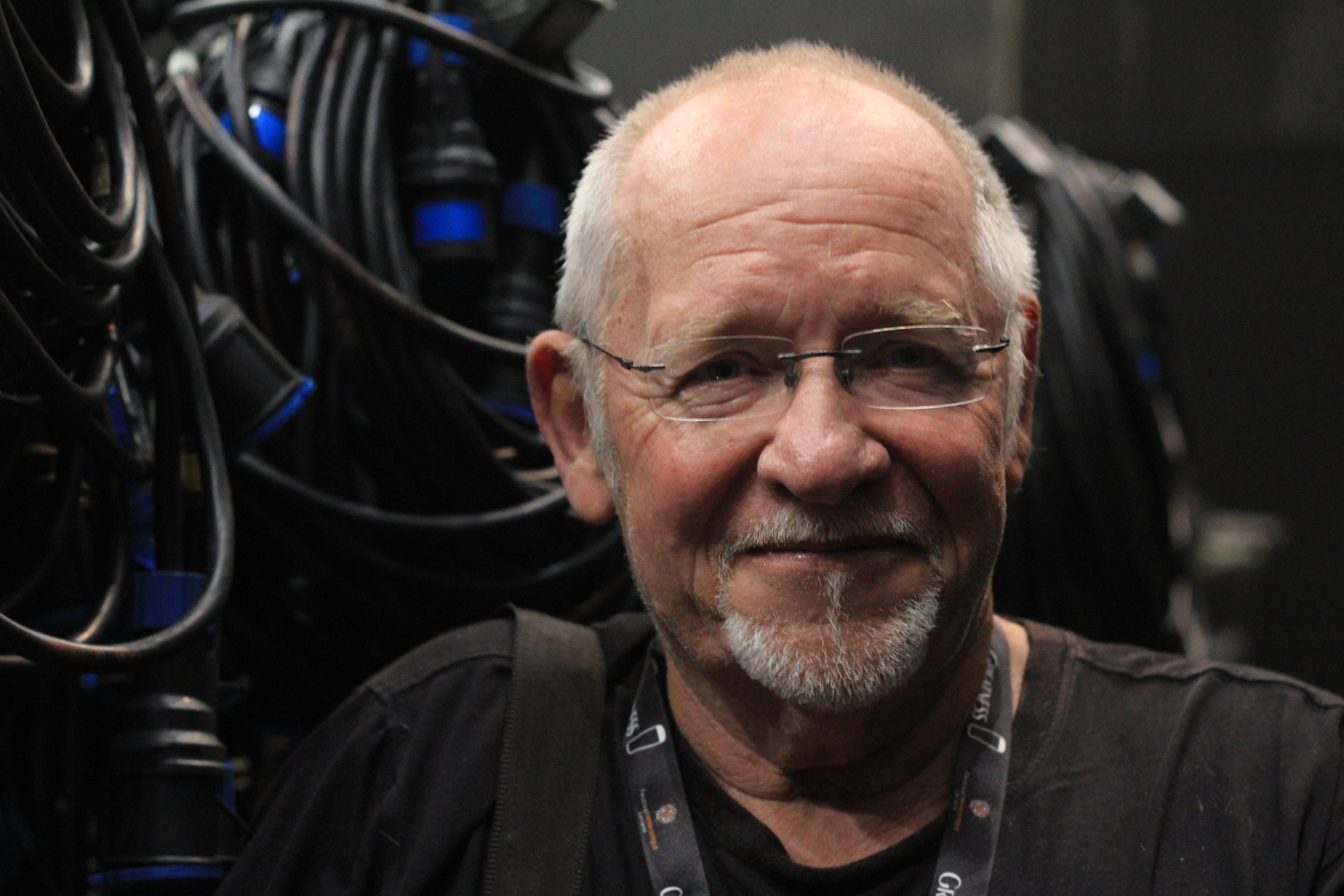
Eric Bogle

Notable Australian exponents of the folk revival movement included both European immigrants such as Eric Bogle, noted for his sad lament to the battle of Gallipoli "And the Band Played Waltzing Matilda", and more contemporary artists such as Archie Roach and Paul Kelly. Kelly's lyrics capture the vastness of the culture and landscape of Australia by chronicling life about him for over 30 years. David Fricke from Rolling Stone calls Kelly "one of the finest songwriters I have ever heard, Australian or otherwise." In the 1970s, Australian Folk Rock brought both familiar and less familiar traditional songs, as well as new compositions, to live venues and the airwaves. Notable artists include the Bushwackers and Redgum. Redgum are known for their 1983 anti-war protest song "I Was Only Nineteen", which peaked at No. 1 on the National singles charts. The 1990s brought Australian indigenous folk rock to the world, led by bands including Yothu Yindi. Australia's long and continuous folk tradition continues strongly to this day, with elements of folk music still present in many contemporary artists including those generally thought of as Rock, Heavy Metal and Alternative Music.

== Popular music ==
=== Early pop music ===
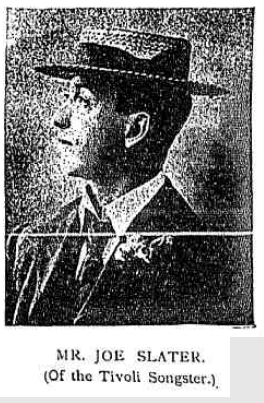
Joe Slater

Australian Cradle Song (1919
MIDI rendition)

What'll we do, when the wattle blooms again? by Reginald Stoneham (1919
MIDI rendition)

Australian composers who published popular musical works (e.g. Ragtime, light ephemera) in the early twentieth century include Vince Courtney, Herbert De Pinna, Jack Lumsdaine, Joe Slater, Bert Rache, Reginald Stoneham, Clement Scott and Herbert Cosgrove, among others. Demand for local works declined with recording and broadcast.

Possibly the first Australian song to compete with imported recordings was Good-Night Mister Moon by Allan Ryan and William Flynn

=== Country music ===
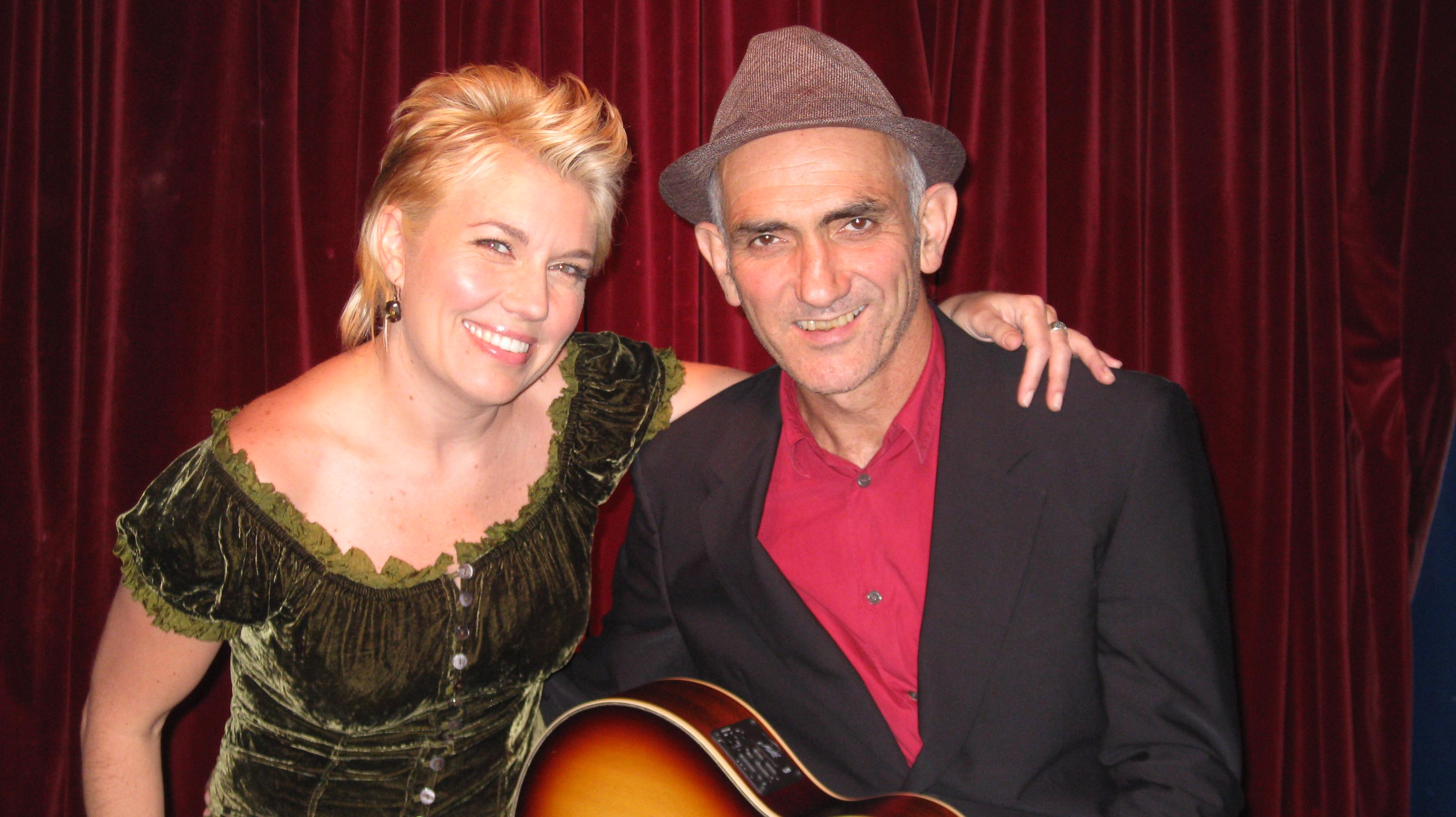
Country singer Melinda Schneider with folk-rocker Paul Kelly

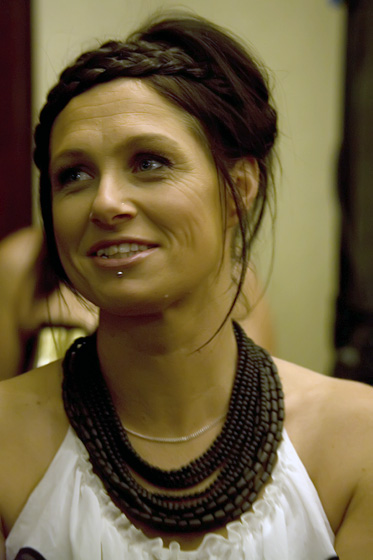
Kasey Chambers

Australia has a long tradition of country music, which has developed a style quite distinct from its US counterpart. The early roots of Australian country are related to traditional folk music traditions of Ireland, England, Scotland and many diverse nations. "Botany Bay" from the late 19th century is one example. "Waltzing Matilda", often regarded by foreigners as Australia's unofficial national anthem, is a quintessential Australian country song, influenced more by Celtic folk ballads than by American Country and Western music. This strain of Australian country music, with lyrics focusing on strictly Australian subjects, is generally known as "bush music" or "bush band music." The most successful Australian bush band is Melbourne's the Bushwackers, active since the early 1970s, other well-known country singers include Reg Lindsay, bush balladeer singer Buddy Williams, and entertainers Johnny Ashcroft and Chad Morgan.

Another, more Americanized form of Australian country music was pioneered in the 1930s by such recording artists as Tex Morton, and later popularized by Slim Dusty, best remembered for his 1957 song "A Pub With No Beer", and Smoky Dawson. Dusty married singer-songwriter Joy McKean in 1951 and became Australia's biggest selling domestic music artist with more than 7 million record sales. British-born country singer and yodeller, Frank Ifield, was one of the first Australian post-war performers to gain widespread international recognition. After returning to the UK in 1959 Ifield was successful in the early 1960s, becoming the first performer to have three consecutive number-one hits on the UK charts: "I Remember You", "Lovesick Blues" (both 1962) and "The Wayward Wind" (1963). "I Remember You" was also a Top-5 hit in the US.

Australian country artists including Olivia Newton-John, Sherrie Austin, and Keith Urban have achieved considerable success in the USA. In recent years local contemporary country music, featuring much crossover with popular music, had popularity in Australia; notable musicians of this genre include David Hudson, John Williamson, Gina Jeffreys, Lee Kernaghan, Troy Cassar-Daley, Sara Storer, Felicity Urquhart, and Kasey Chambers. Others influenced by the genre include Nick Cave, Paul Kelly, the John Butler Trio, Jagged Stone and the Waifs. Popular Australian country songs include "Click Go the Shears" (Traditional), "Lights on the Hill" (1973), "I Honestly Love You" (1974), "True Blue" (1981), and "Not Pretty Enough" (2002).

=== Children's music ===
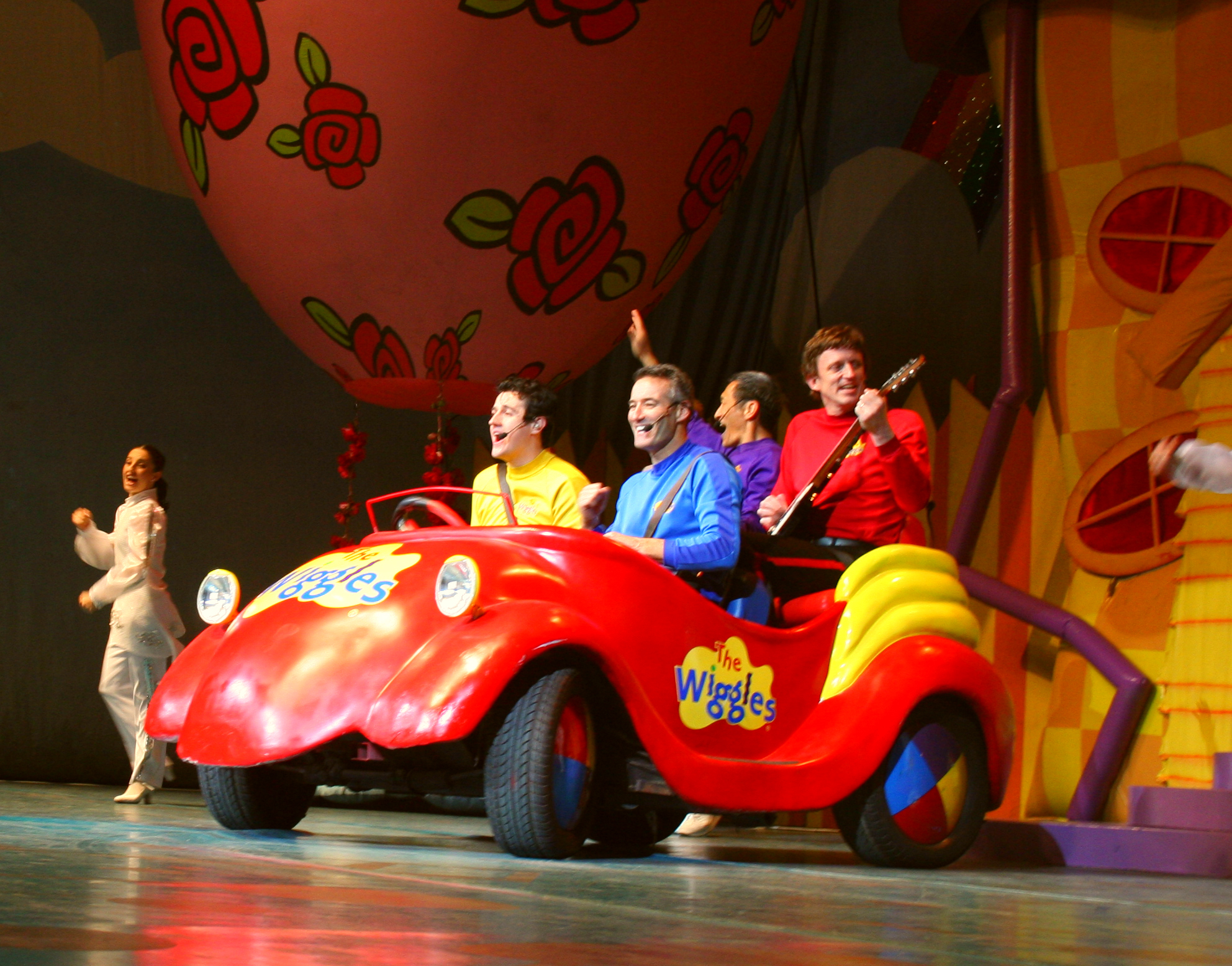
The Wiggles' lineup in 2007, riding in the Big Red Car during a concert

Children's music in Australia developed gradually over the latter half of the 20th century. Some of the most recognised performers in that period were those associated with the long-running Australian Broadcasting Corporation series Play School, including veteran actor-musician Don Spencer and actor and singer Noni Hazlehurst. Children's music remained a relatively small segment of the Australian music industry until the emergence of groundbreaking children's group the Wiggles in the late 1990s. The multi-award-winning four-piece group rapidly gained international popularity in the early 2000s and by the end of the decade they had become one of the most popular children's groups in the world. The Wiggles now boasts a huge fanbase in many regions including Australasia, Britain, Asia, and the Americas.

In 2008, the Wiggles were named Business Review Weekly's top-earning Australian entertainers for the fourth year in a row, having earned A$45 million in 2007. They have been called "the world's biggest preschool band" and "your child's first rock band". The group has achieved worldwide success with their children's albums, videos, television series, and concert appearances. They have earned 18 gold, 13 platinum, three double-platinum, and ten multi-platinum awards; additionally 15 ARIA Awards for Best Children's Album (making ARIA history as the most awarded ARIA winner in the one category), received the ARIA for Best Australian Live Act, and been inducted into the ARIA Hall of Fame.

By 2002, the Wiggles had become the Australian Broadcasting Corporation's (ABC) most successful pre-school television program. They have performed for over 1.5 million children in the US between 2005 and 2008. They have won APRA song writing awards for Best Children's Song three times and earned ADSDA's award for Highest Selling Children's Album four times. They have been nominated for ARIA's Best Children's Album award nineteen times, and won the award twelve times. In 2003, they received ARIA's Outstanding Achievement Award for their success in the U.S. and were also inducted into the ARIA Hall of Fame in 2011.

Peter Combe, Patsy Biscoe, Hi-5 and Spaghetti Confetti are other notable names within the industry.

=== R&B and soul music ===
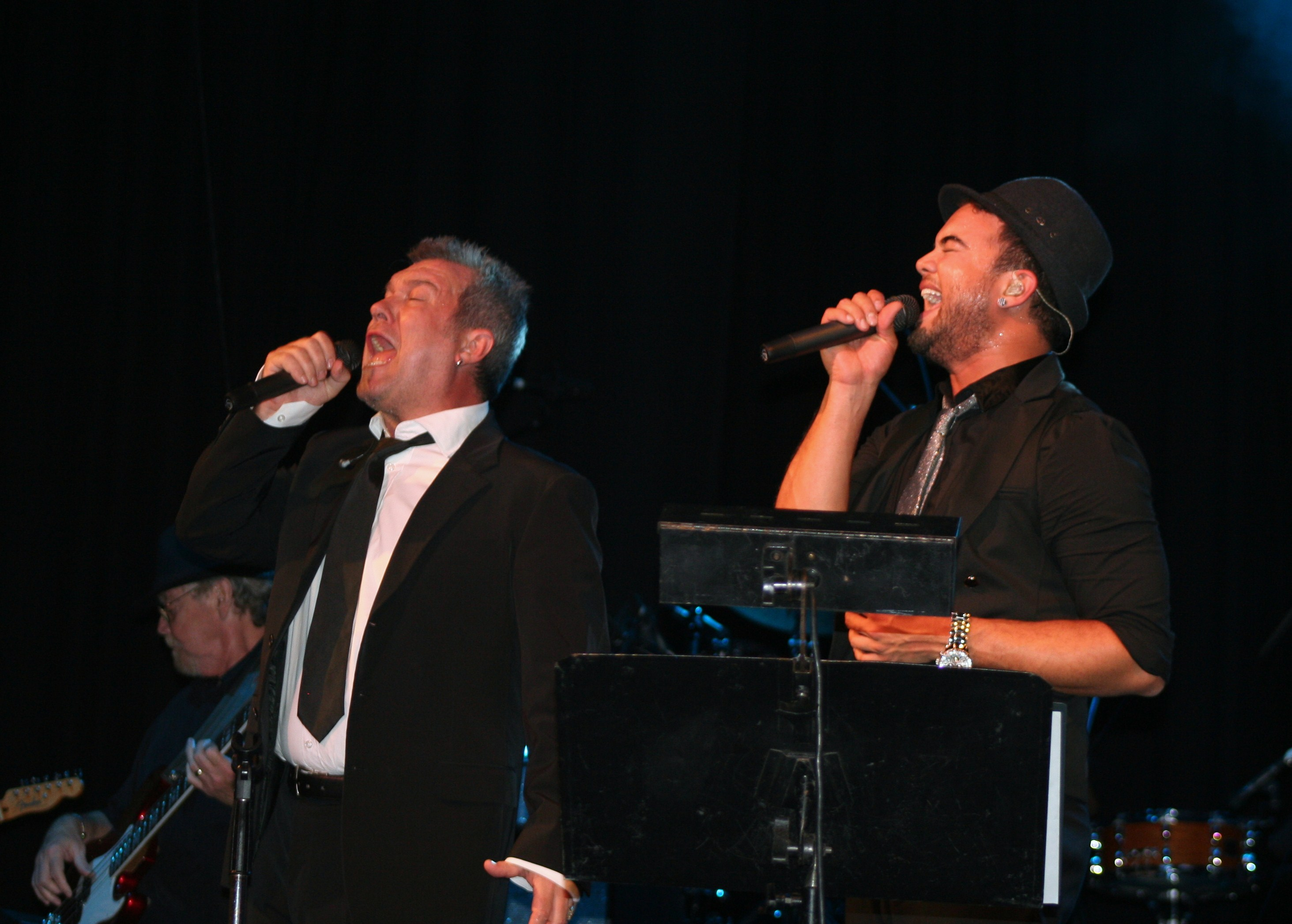
Guy Sebastian and Jimmy Barnes 6 March 2008 State Theatre

R&B soul music had a significant impact on Australian's music, although it is notable that many seminal recordings in this genre by American acts of the late 20th century were not played on Australian radio. Anecdotal evidence suggest that racism was a key factor—in his book on the history of Australian radio, author and broadcaster Wayne Mac recounts that when a local Melbourne DJ of the 1960s played the new Ike and Tina Turner single "River Deep Mountain High" it was immediately pulled from the playlist by the station's program manager for being "too noisy and too black".

Renée Geyer is an Australian singer who came to prominence in the mid-1970s, has long been regarded as one of the finest exponents of jazz, soul and R&B idioms. She had commercial success as a solo artist in Australia, with "It's a Man's Man's World "Rock historian, Ian McFarlane described her as having a "rich, soulful, passionate and husky vocal delivery". Geyer's iconic status in the Australian music industry was recognised when she was inducted into the ARIA Hall of Fame on 14 July 2005.

Parallel with Geyer's success, American born vocalist Marcia Hines emerged as one of Australia's most successful solo singers. She first came to prominence in the early 1970s with critically acclaimed roles in the local stage productions of Hair and Jesus Christ Superstar (in which she was the first African-American to play the role of Mary Magdalene) before launching a solo career. By the late 1970s she was one of Australia's top singing stars, winning several Queen of Pop awards and hosting her own national TV variety series.

Following their initial dissolution in 1982 Cold Chisel lead vocalist Jimmy Barnes embarked on a successful solo career that has continued from the 1980s to the present. Many of Barnes' albums have featured versions of songs from these genres and his chart-topping album Soul Deep (1991) consisted entirely of covers of classic 1960s soul/R&B covers. Australian soul singer/songwriters like Daniel Merriweather, has after several successful collaborations with artists such as Mark Ronson, released his official debut album, Love & War, in June 2009. It entered the UK Albums Chart at number two. After launching his career as the winner of an early series of Australian Idol, soul singer/songwriter Guy Sebastian has also made an impact on this genre in Australia winning awards at the Urban Music Awards Australia and New Zealand for Best Male Artist and Best R&B Album. Sebastian's recent release "Like it Like That", was the highest selling Australian artist single in 2009 and charted at No. 1 for two consecutive weeks

In 2004, Australian Idol finalist Paulini's debut single "Angel Eyes" and album One Determined Heart both reached number one on the ARIA charts and were certified platinum. Paulini earned ARIA No. 1 Chart Awards for both the single and album. Her second album Superwoman included the singles "Rough Day" and "So Over You", and earned Paulini two nominations at the 2007 Urban Music Awards for 'Best R&B Album' and 'Best Female Artist'.

2006 Australian Idol runner-up Jessica Mauboy made her musical solo debut in 2008 with the single "Running Back", which featured American rapper Flo Rida, and peaked at number three on the ARIA Singles Chart, eventually being certified double platinum. Her debut album Been Waiting earned her seven nominations at the 2009 ARIA Music Awards, winning the award of 'Highest Selling Single' for "Running Back".

=== Reggae ===
Reggae had success on the radio charts in Australia in the early 1980s when Toots and the Maytals, the first artist to use the term "reggae" in song, went to number one with their song "Beautiful Woman". Early reggae groups from Australia include No Fixed Address.

=== Rock and pop ===
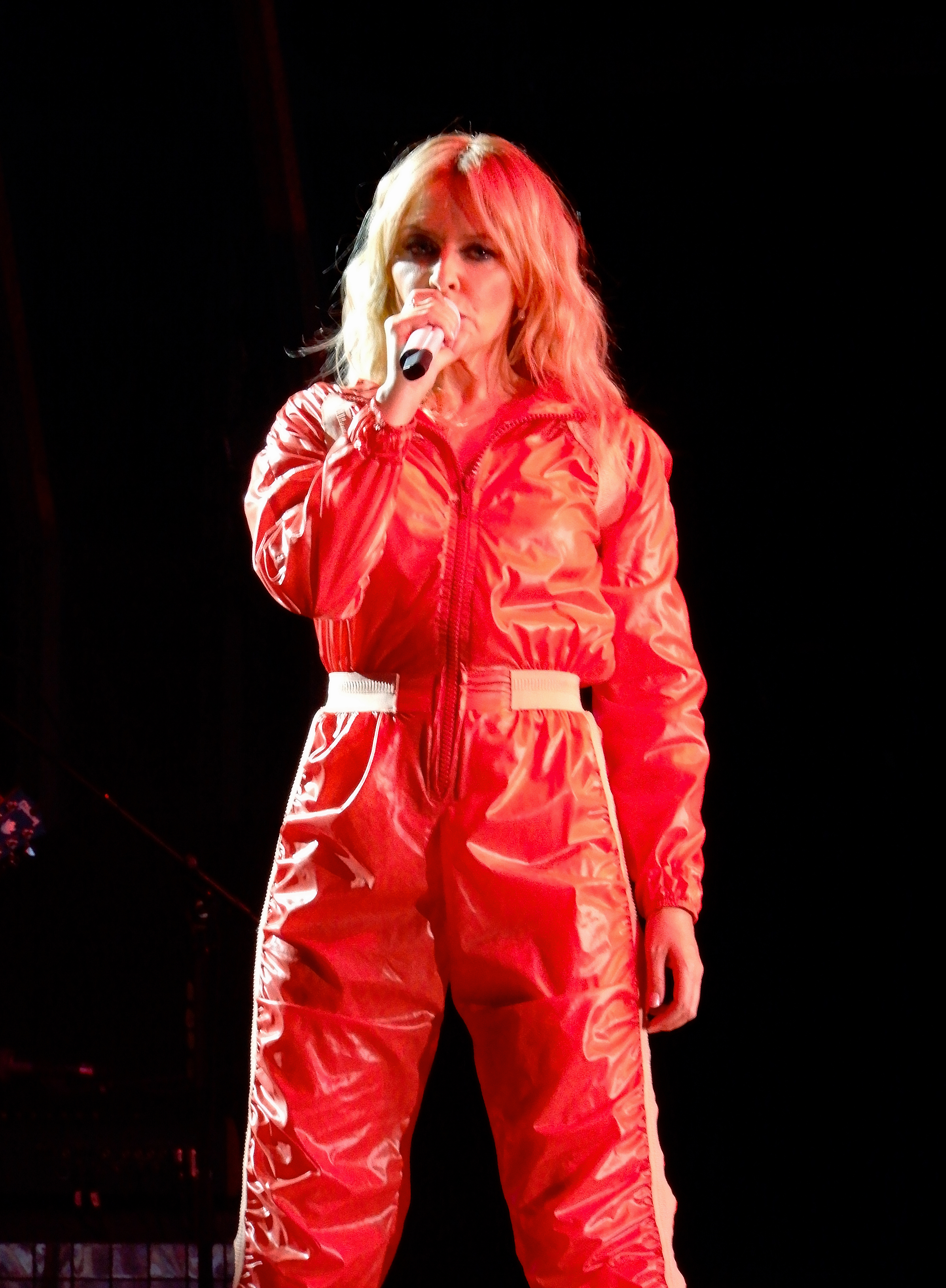
Kylie Minogue is the highest-selling female Australian artist of all time, having sold over 80 million records worldwide.

Australia has produced a wide variety of rock and popular music, from the internationally successful groups AC/DC, INXS, Nick Cave, Savage Garden, the Seekers, or pop divas Delta Goodrem, Kylie Minogue to the popular local content of John Farnham, Jimmy Barnes or Paul Kelly. Indigenous Australian music and Australian jazz have also had crossover influence on this genre. Early Australian rock and roll stars included Col Joye and Johnny O'Keefe. O'Keefe formed a band in 1956; his hit Wild One made him the first Australian rock'n'roller to reach the national charts. While US and British content dominated airwaves and record sales into the 1960s, local successes began to emerge – notably the Easybeats and the folk-pop group the Seekers had significant local success and some international recognition, while AC/DC had their first hits in Australia before going on to international success.

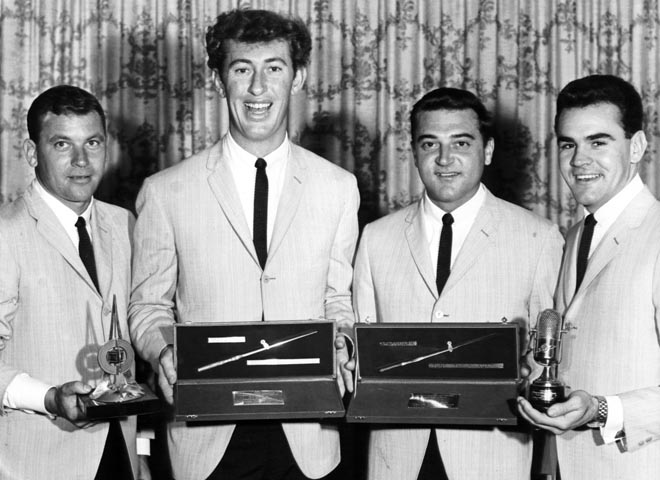
The Delltones with four radio awards

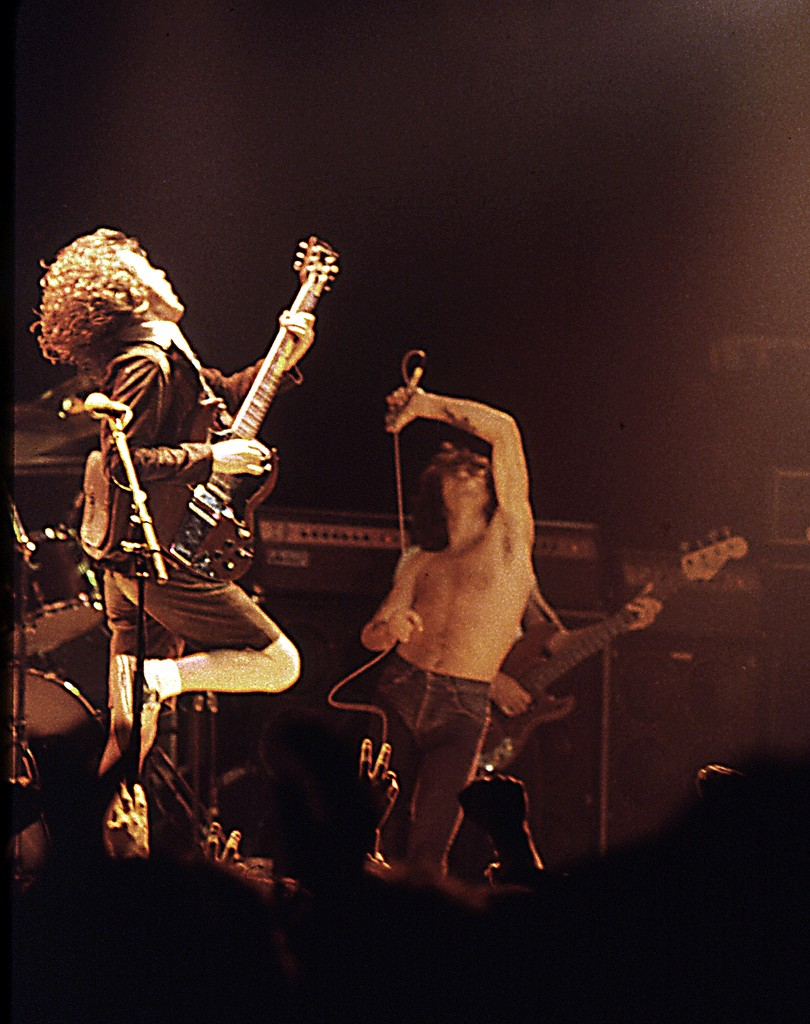
AC/DC performing at the Ulster Hall in August 1979

A pivotal event was the 1970 radio ban, which lasted from May to October that year. The Ban was the climax of a simmering "pay for play" dispute between major record companies and commercial radio stations, who refused to pay a proposed new copyright fee for playing pop records on air. The dispute erupted into open conflict in May 1970—many commercial stations boycotted records by the labels involved and refused to list their releases on their Top 40 charts, while the record companies in turn refused to supply radio with free promotional copies of new releases.

An unexpected side-effect of the ban was that several emerging Australian acts signed to independent labels (who were not part of the dispute) scored hits with covers of overseas hits; these included the Mixtures' cover of Mungo Jerry's "In the Summertime" and Liv Maessen's cover of Mary Hopkin's Eurovision song "Knock, Knock Who's There?".

Despite commercial radio resistance to the more progressive music being produced by bands like Spectrum and Tully, acts as diverse as AC/DC, Sherbet and John Paul Young were able to achieve major success and develop a unique sound for Australian rock. From 1975, key agents for the increased exposure of local music were the nationally broadcast ABC-TV television pop show Countdown, which premiered in late 1974, and Australia's first non-commercial all-rock radio station Double Jay, which opened in January 1975. Hard rock bands AC/DC and Rose Tattoo and harmony rock group Little River Band also found major overseas success in the late 1970s and early 1980s, touring all over the world. Meanwhile, a score of Australian expatriate solo performers like Helen Reddy, Olivia Newton-John and Peter Allen became major stars in the US and internationally. Icehouse also formed in the late 1970s.

Pop magazines such as Go-Set (which began in 1966), the Daily Planet, and television programs such as Countdown promoted Australian popular music to the youth market.

==== 1980s ====
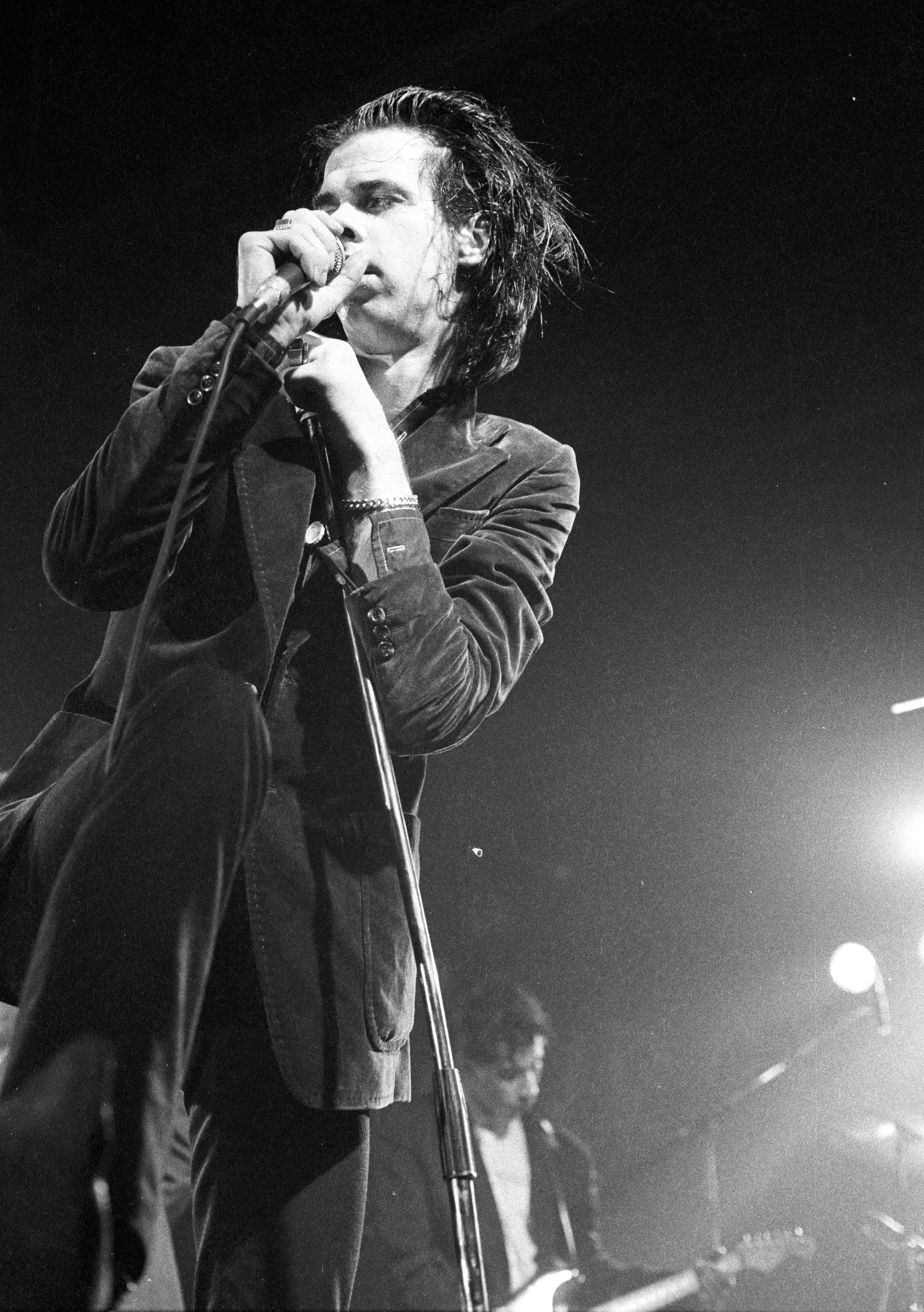
Nick Cave performing in 1986

The 1980s saw a breakthrough in the independence of Australian rock—Nick Cave said that before the 1980s, "Australia still needed America or England to tell them what was good". An example of Australians breaking free from convention came in TISM. Formed in 1982, the band is known for its anonymous members, outrageous stage antics, and humorous lyrics. In the words of the band, "There's only one factor left that makes us work. And that factor, I think, we've burned away, with the crucible of time, into something that's actually genuine."

Men at Work, Divinyls, and Hoodoo Gurus, INXS all formed between 1977 and 1981, became hugely successful worldwide. Men at Work's "Down Under" hit number one in Australia, Europe, the UK, Canada, and the United States, and was considered the theme song of Australia's successful showing at the 1983 America's Cup. Hoodoo Gurus, meanwhile, hit it big on the US college circuit—all of their 1980s albums topped the chart. At the same time, a number of Australian bands relocated to the U.K. and particularly London to further their artistic and commercial endeavours, among whom were the Moodists, the Go-Betweens, the Birthday Party with guitarist Rowland S. Howard, Laughing Clowns, Foetus, SPK, the Triffids, and Peter Loveday.

===== Grunge =====
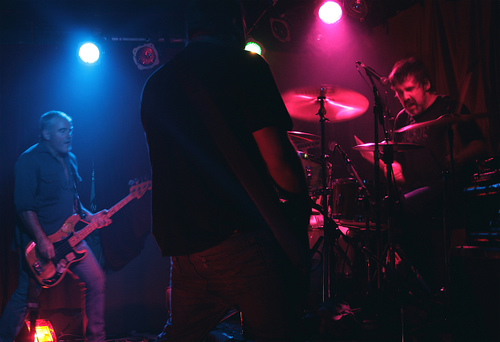
Cosmic Psychos, one of several Australian bands which influenced and interacted with the Seattle grunge scene

Grunge is a subgenre of alternative rock and a subculture that emerged during the mid-1980s in Australia and in the Pacific Northwest U.S. state of Washington. The early grunge movement in the US revolved around Seattle's independent record label Sub Pop and that region's underground music scene. By the early 1990s, its popularity had spread, with grunge bands appearing in California, then emerging in other parts of the United States and in Australia, building strong followings and signing major record deals. Mark Arm, the vocalist for the Seattle band Green River—and later Mudhoney—stated that the term had been used in Australia in the mid-1980s to describe bands such as King Snake Roost, The Scientists, Salamander Jim, and Beasts of Bourbon. Arm used grunge as a descriptive term rather than a genre term, but it eventually came to describe the punk/metal hybrid sound of the Seattle music scene.

Several Australian bands, including Cosmic Psychos and Feedtime are cited as precursors to grunge, their music influencing the Seattle scene through the college radio broadcasts of Sub Pop founder Jonathan Poneman and members of Mudhoney. Chris Dubrow from The Guardian states that, in the late 1980s, Australia's "sticky-floored...alternative pub scene" in seedy inner-city areas produced grunge bands with "raw and awkward energy" such as X, Feedtime and Lubricated Goat. Dubrow said "Cobain...admitted the Australian wave was a big influence" on his music. Everett True states that "[t]here's more of an argument to be had for grunge beginning in Australia with the Scientists and their scrawny punk ilk."

From being discovered in mid-1994 with their debut single "Tomorrow" to their 1995 debut album Frogstomp (which sold more than 4 million copies worldwide), Silverchair were considered by some to be grunge's "last stand". The band's trio of teenagers—Ben Gillies on drums, Daniel Johns on vocals and guitars, and Chris Joannou on bass guitar—were still in high school when the album went to number one in Australia and New Zealand.

==== 1990s: Indie rock ====
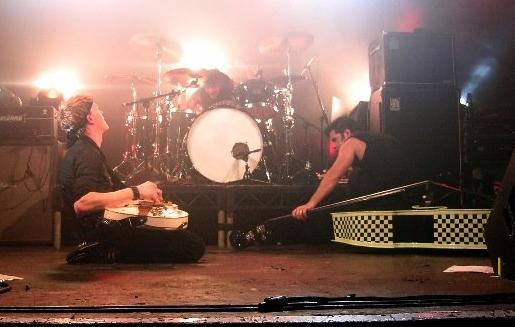
Psychobilly group the Living End were successful internationally in the 1990s

The 1990s saw continued overseas success from groups such as AC/DC, INXS, Men at Work, Midnight Oil, the Bad Seeds, and a new indie rock scene started to develop locally. Sydney-based Ratcat were the first new band to achieve a mainstream following, while bands such as the Hoodoo Gurus got off to a slower start; their debut album Stoneage Romeos earned a small following but failed to captivate a mainstream that at the time "didn't get it". Later reviews described the band as "integral to the story of Aussie indie music", influencing bands including Frenzal Rhomb and Jet. The band became an ARIA Hall of Fame inductee. The Church, meanwhile, was highly successful in the 1980s, only to see their careers diminish in the next decade; 1994's Sometime Anywhere saw the band recede from a mainstream audience.

Alternative rock began to gain popularity midway through the 1990s, with grunge and Britpop styles especially popular, resulting in a new wave of Australian bands. Some—such as Savage Garden, the Living End and Silverchair—also gained quick success in the United States, while You Am I, Jebediah, Magic Dirt, Something for Kate, Icecream Hands and Powderfinger gained more success locally. Bands such as Regurgitator and Spiderbait were hit heavily by the post-grunge backlash, losing in sales and critical acclaim.

Much of the success of rock in Australia is attributed to the non-commercial Australian Broadcasting Corporation's radio station Triple J, which focuses heavily on Australian alternative music, and has done so since its formation as 2JJ in 1975. Throughout the station's history, they have helped jump start the careers of numerous bands such as Missy Higgins and Killing Heidi through programs such as Unearthed, the Australian Music program Home & Hosed and the Hottest 100.

The Big Day Out festival has showcased Australian and international acts, with line-ups spanning multiple genres, with an alternative focus. It has become highly popular amongst musicians; Foo Fighters lead singer Dave Grohl said "We play the Big Day Out because it's the best tour in the world. You ask any band in the world – they all want to play the Big Day Out, every single one of them." Other festivals, such as Homebake, Livid, and Splendour in the Grass, are also rock focused, and together with Big Day Out are "united by the dominant presence of the indie-guitar scene". Australia made its first appearance in the Eurovision Song Contest 2015 after being granted a spot in the final by the EBU.

=== Electronic and dance music ===
Australian electronic music duo The Presets

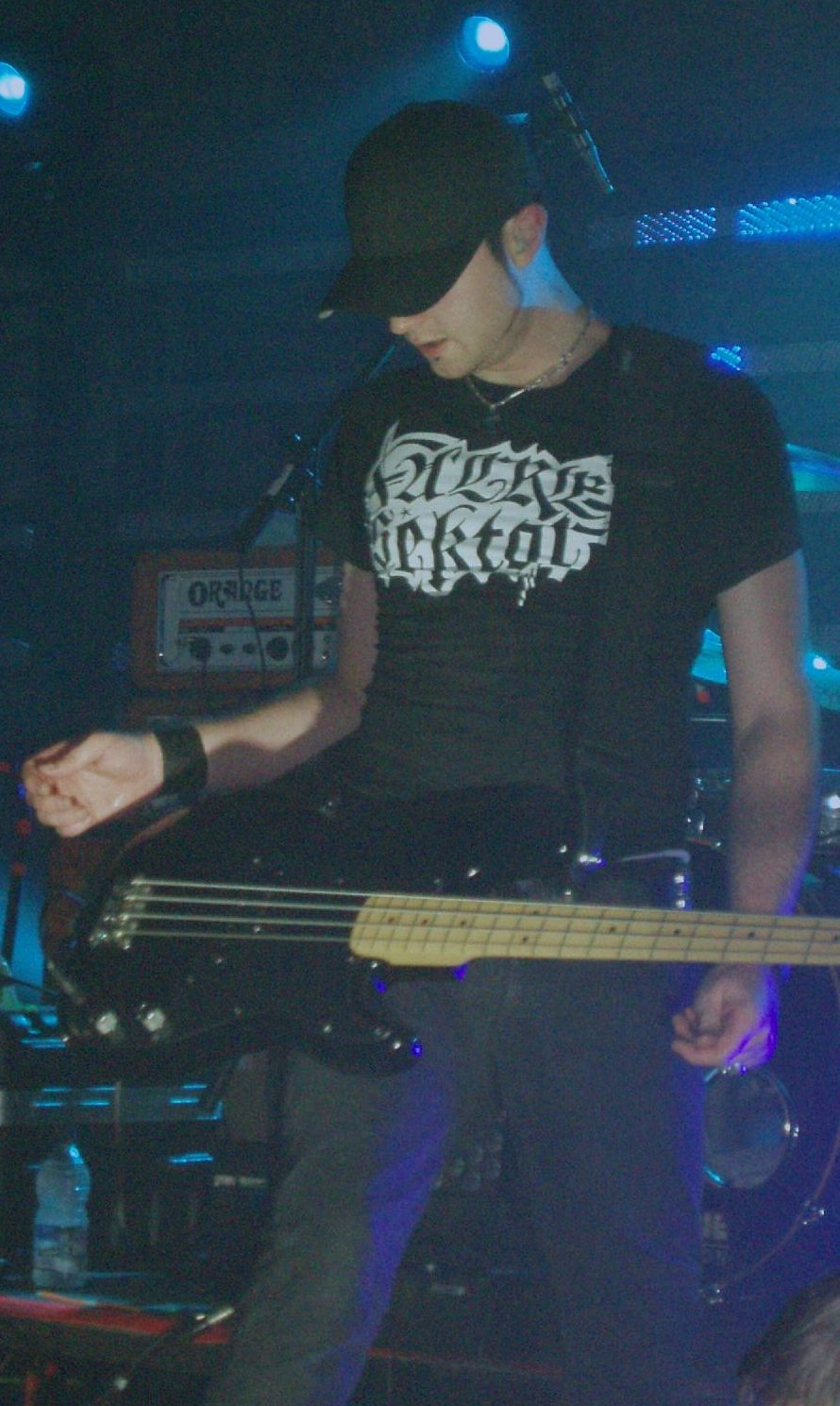
Pendulum bassist Gareth McGrillen. The band blends electronic and rock elements.

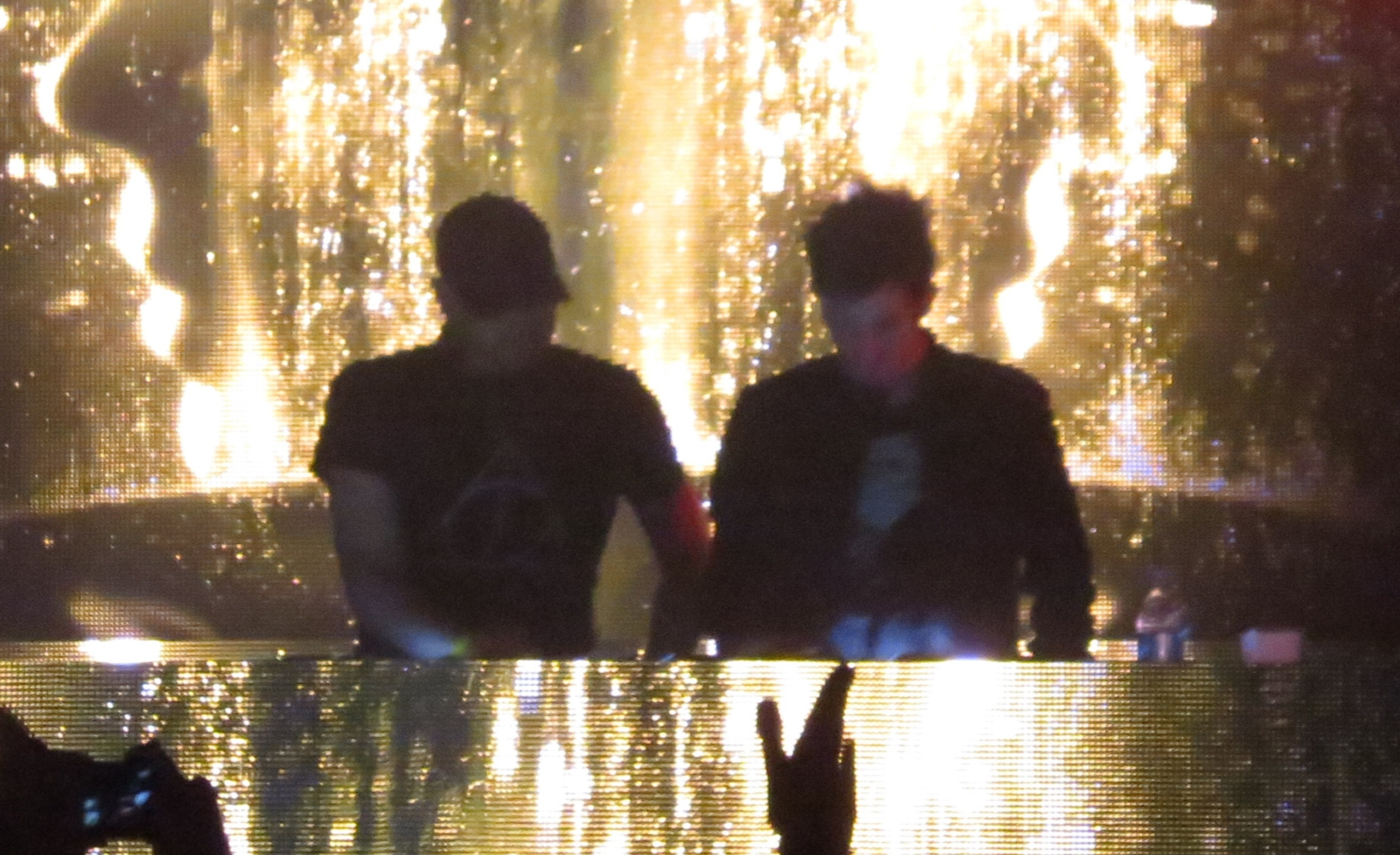
Knife Party performing live. The duo formed as a side project by Pendulum members Rob Swire and Gareth McGrillen.

Electronic music in Australia emerged in the 1990s, drawing from styles such as funk, house, techno, and trance. Early innovators included Whirlywirld and Severed Heads, who were among the first electronic acts to play the Big Day Out and gained recognition for their experimental sound.

In the 2000s, Australian electronic acts began achieving mainstream and international success. The Presets rose to prominence with their fusion of electro-house and synth-pop, winning multiple ARIA Music Awards and helping define the "Modular Records" sound of the mid-2000s. Their 2008 album Apocalypso was a commercial and critical success, cementing their role in the evolution of Australian dance music.

Pendulum, formed in Perth in 2002, brought drum and bass into the Australian mainstream by blending electronic production with live instrumentation and rock influences. Their debut album, Hold Your Colour, became one of the best-selling drum and bass albums of all time and expanded their reach to Europe and North America.

Following their success with Pendulum, members Rob Swire and Gareth McGrillen formed Knife Party, an electro house and dubstep duo that gained international popularity with aggressive, high-energy tracks such as "Internet Friends" and "Centipede". Knife Party became a prominent act at global festivals, further raising the profile of Australian electronic producers on the world stage.

Educational institutions have also embraced the genre; the University of Adelaide's Electronic Music Unit and Melbourne's School of Synthesis—founded by producer Davide Carbone—provide training in music technology and production.

Other notable acts such as Pnau, Rogue Traders, and Regurgitator have contributed to the genre by blending electronic styles with pop, rock, and hip-hop. The success of these artists led to a growth in electronic music festivals including Two Tribes, Future Music Festival, Stereosonic, Defqon.1, Utopia, and IQON, although mainstream radio support remains limited.

Sydney-based magazine Cyclic Defrost, founded in 1998, remains one of the few Australian publications dedicated solely to electronic music and culture.

Between 2021-2026, electronic music began to rise in the charts. Australian artists like Ninajirachi, Daine (singer), and many more have made their mark internationally.

=== Grime ===
Grime is a British electronic genre that emerged in the early 2000s, derivative of electronic music such as UK garage and jungle, and draws influence from dancehall, ragga, and hip-hop. The style is typified by rapid, syncopated breakbeats, generally around 140 bpm, and often features an aggressive or jagged electronic sound. Rapping is also a significant element of the style, and lyrics often revolve around gritty depictions of urban life.

Australian grime emerged in 2010 after UK-born artist Fraksha released his mixtape It's Just Bars. Fraksha is widely regarded as a pioneer of the scene in Australia. Fraksha, alongside fellow MC's Scotty Hinds, Diem and Murky, formed the first Australian based grime collective, Smash Brothers, in 2010. Smash Brothers pioneered what became Australian grime music, and were known for their high energy performances. For the most part, few members initially released a lot of music other than Fraksha, but all were active in the raving scene where they exposed many to grime music. They also worked with UK based artists such as Skepta, Foreign Beggars and Dexplicit. Another first for Fraksha was the launch of Melbourne radio show The Sunday Roast on KissFM with Affiks, dedicated to grime and Dubstep music. In 2011 he started the first Australian grime night alongside Affiks and Artic called 50/50. Fraksha in 2011 performed in New Zealand alongside UK grime pioneer Dizzee Rascal.

The resurgence grime was experiencing in the UK during the mid-2010s also reached Australia. The sound's resurgence also affected the popularity of grime in Australia, with various other Australian MC's picking up the sound with success, such as Diem, Alex Jones, Shadow, Talakai, Nerve, Wombat and Seru.

== Art music ==
=== Jazz ===
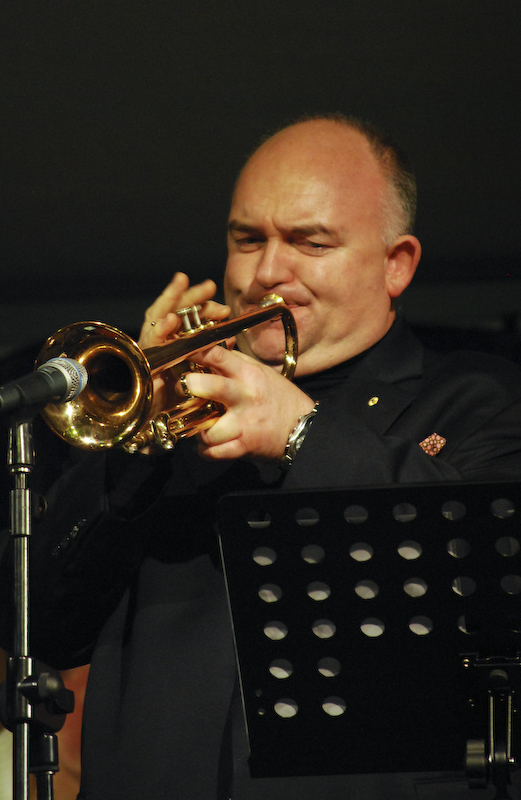
James Morrison

The history of jazz and related genres in Australia extends back into the 19th century. During the gold rush locally formed blackface (white actor-musicians in blackface) minstrel troupes began to tour Australia, touring not only the capital cities but also many of the booming regional towns like Ballarat and Bendigo. Minstrel orchestra music featured improvisatory embellishment and polyrhythm in the (pre-classic) banjo playing and clever percussion breaks. Some genuine African-American minstrel and jubilee singing troupes toured from the 1870s. A more jazz-like form of minstrelsy reached Australia in the late 1890s in the form of improvisatory and syncopated coon song and cakewalk music, two early forms of ragtime. The next two decades brought ensemble, piano and vocal ragtime and leading (mostly white) American ragtime artists, including Ben Harney, "Emperor of Ragtime" Gene Greene and pianist Charley Straight. Some of these visitors taught Australians how to 'rag' (improvise unsyncopated popular music into ragtime-style music).

By the mid-1920s, phonograph machines, increased contact with American popular music and visiting white American dance musicians had firmly established jazz (meaning jazz inflected modern dance and stage music) in Australia. The first recordings of jazz in Australia are Mastertouch piano rolls recorded in Sydney from around 1922 but jazz began to be recorded on disc by 1925, first in Melbourne and soon thereafter in Sydney. Soon after World War II, jazz in Australia diverged into two strands. One was based on the earlier collectively improvised called "dixieland" or traditional jazz. The other so-called modernist stream was based on big band swing, small band progressive swing, boogie woogie, and after WWII, the emerging new style of bebop. By the 1950s American bop, itself, was dividing into so-called 'cool' and 'hard' bop schools, the latter being more polyrhythmic and aggressive. This division reached Australia on a small scale by the end of the 1950s. From the mid-1950s rock and roll began to draw young audiences and social dancers away from jazz. British-style dixieland, called Trad, became popular in the early 1960s. Most modern players stuck with the 'cool' (often called West Coast) style, but some experimented with free jazz, modal jazz, experiment with 'Eastern' influences, art music and visual art concept, electronic and jazz-rock fusions.

The 1970s brought tertiary jazz education courses and continuing innovation and diversification in jazz which, by the late 1980s, included world music fusion and contemporary classical and jazz crossovers. From this time, the trend towards eclectic style fusions has continued with ensembles like The Catholics, Australian Art Orchestra, Tongue and Groove, austraLYSIS, Wanderlust, The Necks and many others. It is questionable whether the label jazz is elastic enough to continue to embrace the ever-widening range of improvisatory music that is associated with the term jazz in Australia. However, mainstream modern jazz and dixieland still have the strongest following and patron still flock to hear famous mainstream artists who have been around for decades, such as One Night Stand players Dugald Shaw and Blair Jordan, reeds player Don Burrows and trumpeter James Morrison and, sometimes, the famous pioneer of traditional jazz in Australia, Graeme Bell. A non-academic genre of jazz has also evolved with a harder "street edge" style. The Conglomerate, The Bamboos, Damage, Cookin on Three Burners, Black Money John McAll are examples of this. See:

- Andrew Bisset. Black Roots White Flowers, Golden Press, 1978
- Bruce Johnson. The Oxford Companion to Australian Jazz OUP, 1987
- John Whiteoak. Playing Ad Lib: Improvisatory Music in Australia: 1836–1970, Currency Press, 1999

== Sacred music ==
Aboriginal and Torres Strait Islanders

The most ancient musical traditions in Australia transmit the beliefs of the Aboriginal Dream Time. The Ntaria Choir at Hermannsburg, Northern Territory, has a unique musical language which mixes the traditional vocals of the Ntaria Aboriginal women with Lutheran chorales (tunes that were the basis of much of Bach's music). Baba Waiyar, a popular traditional Torres Strait Islander hymn shows the influence of gospel music mixed with traditionally strong Torres Strait Islander vocals and country music. The Australian Aboriginal singer-songwriter Jimmy Little found success in the genre. His gospel song "Royal Telephone" (1963) was the first No.1 hit by an Aboriginal artist.

Church Music

Australian composers of church music include George Savin De Chanéet, John Albert Delany, Edwin Fowles, Nathan Isaac, Alfred Wheeler, Christian Helleman, Guglielmo Enrico Lardelli, Arthur Massey, Frederick Augustus Packer, William Robert Knox, George William Torrance, Alberto Zelman, Ernest Edwin Mitchell (-1951) and Tharawal Aboriginal Tom Foster.

Christian

Christian music in Australia arrived with the First Fleet of British settlers in 1788 and has grown to include a variety of genres including classical music, hymns, Christian rock, country gospel, and Christmas music. St Mary's Cathedral Choir, Sydney, is the oldest musical institution in Australia, from origins in 1817. Major recording artists from Johnny O'Keefe (the first Australian Rock and Roll star) to Paul Kelly (folk rock), Nick Cave (the critically acclaimed brooding rocker) and Slim Dusty (the King of Australian country music) have all recorded Christian themed songs. Other performing artists such as Catholic nun Sister Janet Mead, Aboriginal crooner Jimmy Little and Australian Idol contestant Guy Sebastian have held Christianity as central to their public persona. The Newsboys were founded in Mooloolaba Australia by Peter Furler and they popularised Christian music with hits like "Shine" and "God's not Dead". Today, Christian music in Australia ranges widely across genres, from Melbourne's St Paul's Cathedral Choir who sing choral evensong most weeknights; to the Contemporary music that is a feature of the evangelical Hillsong congregation.

Christmas music

Annually, Australians gather in large numbers for traditional open-air Christmas concerts in December, such as the Carols by Candlelight of Melbourne, and Sydney's Carols in the Domain. Australian Christmas carols like the Three Drovers or Christmas Day by John Wheeler and William G. James place the Christmas story in an Australian context of warm, dry Christmas winds and red dust. As the festival of Christmas falls during the Australian summer, Australians gather in large numbers for traditional open-air evening carol services and concerts in December, such as Carols by Candlelight in Melbourne and Carols in the Domain in Sydney.

Gospel music

Australian country music's most successful artist Slim Dusty recorded a number of country gospel songs, with which he liked to finish his live shows. In 1971, he released the Gospel album Glory Bound Train, featuring the eponymous hit Glory Bound Train, and other songs of a Christian theme. Glory Bound Train was in turn the song selected to conclude the tribute concert held at Tamworth after his death. The "Concert for Slim" was recorded live on January 20, 2004, at the Tamworth Regional Entertainment Centre, and an all star cast of Australian musicians sung out the show with Slim's Glory Bound Train.

== Funding ==
In March 2019, the Australian government announced an injection of funding worth A$30.9 million in the contemporary music sector. The funding covers support of live music venues, investment for Indigenous music, mentorship programs and music exports.

== See also ==
- APRA AMCOS
- Australian hip-hop
- Culture of Australia
- Australia in the Eurovision Song Contest
- Australian Musician
- Category:Australian musicians
- List of music festivals in Australia
- List of Australian composers
- List of Indigenous Australian musicians, Indigenous musicians and groups
- Encyclopedia of Australian Rock and Pop
- Australian music charts
- Culture of Melbourne#Music
