= Bunyip (disambiguation) =

A bunyip is a legendary Australian creature.

Bunyip may also refer to:

- Bunyip, Victoria, a town
  - Bunyip railway station
- The Bunyip, a newspaper
- The Bunyip (musical)
- Bunyip (Dungeons & Dragons)
