= Sir Guy =

The title Sir Guy is most commonly ascribed to Sir Guy of Gisbourne, a fictional character in Robin Hood folklore.

Sir Guy may also refer to:

== People ==
- Sir Guy Acland, 6th Baronet, British Army officer and member of the Royal Household
- Sir Guy Francis Boileau, 8th of the Boileau baronets
- Sir Guy Bracewell-Smith, 3rd Baronet, of the Smith baronets
- Sir Guy Brian of Torbryan, Devon, father of Guy de Brian, 4th Baron Brian
- Sir Guy Campbell, 1st Baronet, Major-General in the British Army
- Sir Guy Campbell, 5th Baronet, a British colonel
- Sir Guy Carleton, 1st Baron Dorchester
- Sir Guy Calthrop, 1st Baronet
- Sir Guy Dawber, an English architect
- Sir Guy Garrod, senior UK Royal Air Force officer
- Sir Guy Gaunt, Australian-born officer of the British Royal Navy
- Sir Guy Granet, British railway administrator
- Sir Guy Green (judge), Governor of Tasmania
- Sir Guy Lloyd, 1st Baronet, Scottish Unionist Party politician
- Sir Guy Anstruther Knox Marshall, British entomologist and authority on Curculionidae
- Sir Guy Palmes, High Sheriff and Justice of the Peace for Yorkshire.
- Sir Guy Powles, New Zealand diplomat and Governor of Western Samoa
- Sir Guy Russell, British naval commander
- Sir Guy Salisbury-Jones, Major-General in the Royal Household Diplomatic Corps
- Sir Guy Standing (actor), an English actor
- Sir Guy Williams (British Army officer) who served in World War II
- Sir Guy Francis Laking, artist and first keeper of the London Museum
- Sir Guy Douglas Arthur Fleetwood Wilson, a British public servant in colonial India
- Sir Guy Of Warwick, stage name of Renaissance Festival performer

== In fiction ==
- Sir Guy, a character in Timeline (novel) by Michael Crichton
- Sir Guyon fictional character in Spenser's The Faerie Queene
- Sir Guy Paynter, a character in Crusade (Laird novel)
- Sir Guy de Guide, an aristocratic fox in Bertie the Bunyip TV puppet show

== Other ==
- Sir Guy Carleton Elementary School in Vancouver, Canada
- Sir Guy Carleton Secondary School in Ottawa, Canada
