= Ella Airlie =

Australian singer and composer

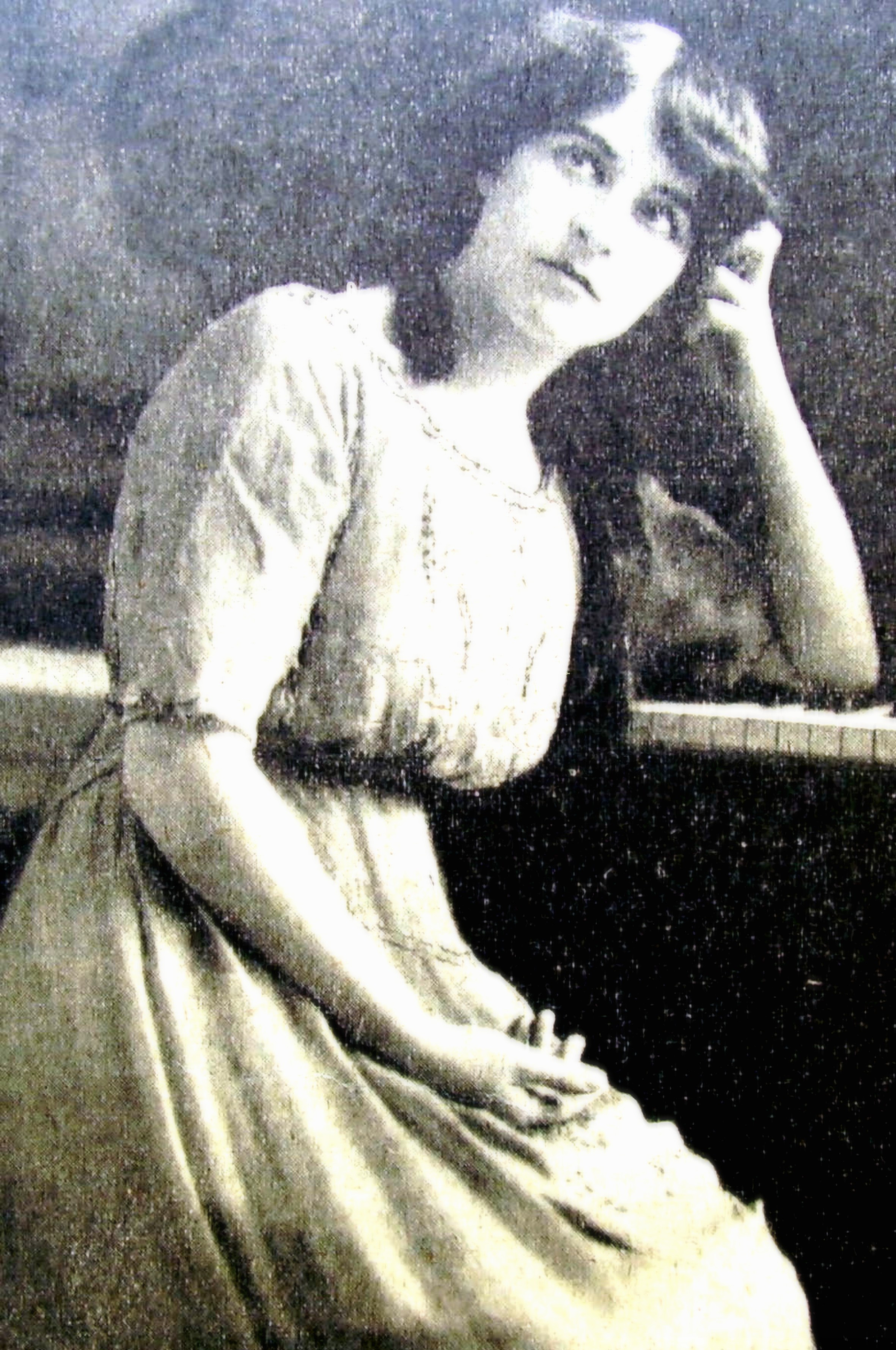
- Airlie in 1916
- Born: Ella Palzer Ogilvey; 1882 Ballarat, Victoria, Australia
- Died: 1959 (aged 76–77)
- Occupation: dramatist; songwriter; pianist; performer
- Notable works: The Bunyip

Ella Airlie (1882–1959), also known as Ella Palzier Campbell, was an Australian librettist, dramatist, songwriter and performer. She co-wrote the successful Australian musical, The Bunyip.

== Life ==
Ella Airlie was born at Ballarat in 1882 as Ella Palzer Ogilvey to Frances Ellen (née Wattis) and William Henry Ogilvey. She was educated at Grenville College in Ballarat.

She was a "sprightly and pretty" Emily St. Evremond in The Ticket of Leave Man, produced to raise funds for an orphanage in Ballarat in 1900. She performed successfully at the annual Musical and Elocutionary Competition in Geelong, including in 1903. She toured to Albury with the English Pierrots in 1906.

She composed both words and music for the song, "There's Sunshine My Side of the Street", which was well-received in J. C. Williamson's 1907 production of Mother Goose. Airlie was also known for her ability to imitate children's voices, performing the song, "Mr. Crocodile" alongside her first husband, juggler George Campbell.

In 1908 Airlie wrote a pantomime, The Bunyip, which she and Nat Phillips later adapted as the 1916 musical, The Bunyip. She also wrote two songs for the production. After premiering at the Grand Opera House in Sydney, The Bunyip had opened at the Princess Theatre in Melbourne in April 1917, and later in Adelaide, Brisbane and Newcastle. The final performances were in Sydney at the Haymarket Hippodrome in 1924.

== Selected works ==
=== Musicals ===
- The Bunyip: A pantomime in two acts (1908)
- The Bunyip, Or, The Enchantment of Fairy Princess Wattle Blossom (1916, with Nat Phillips)
- Sinbad the Sailor (1918 musical)
- Red Riding Hood (1919 musical)

=== Songs ===
- There's Sunshine My Side of the Street (1907 song), "featured with enormous success by Miss Olive Morrell in J.C. Williamson's pantomime Mother Goose".
- Bottle-O (1909 song), "Specially featured by Jack Hagan in Wm. Anderson's pantomime The Babes in the Wood."
- Back to Kosciusko (1916 song), "Successfully introduced into Fullers' brilliant Australian pantomime The Bunyip... Sung by Nellie Kolle"
- Mean Old Moon (1916 song), "Successfully introduced into Fullers' brilliant Australian pantomime The Bunyip... Sung by Caddie Franks"

== Personal life ==
Airlie married English performer George Campbell in Melbourne in 1908. He sued her for divorce in 1924 on the grounds of desertion. She had written from New Zealand in 1920, suggesting he divorce her and had sold the family home.

She died in 1959.
