= Jenny Wagner (author) =

Australian children's writer

- Born: 1939; England
- Education: University of Melbourne
- Occupation: Author
- Writing career
- Genre: Children's literature
- Notable works: The Bunyip of Berkeley's Creek; John Brown, Rose, and the Midnight Cat
- Notable awards: CBCA Children's Book of the Year (1974, 1978)

Jenny Wagner (born 1939) is an Australian author, known for children's literature.

Wagner was born in England and arrived in Australia around 1948. She studied languages at Melbourne University, and was a scriptwriter for the Australian Broadcasting Commission TV series Bellbird.

She later lived with her husband in Queensland, in 1991 identified as the town of Eumundi.

Before becoming a full-time writer, Wagner ran a coffee-lounge where, inspired by her Austrian-born mother-in-law, everything was made in the traditional way.

== Recognition ==
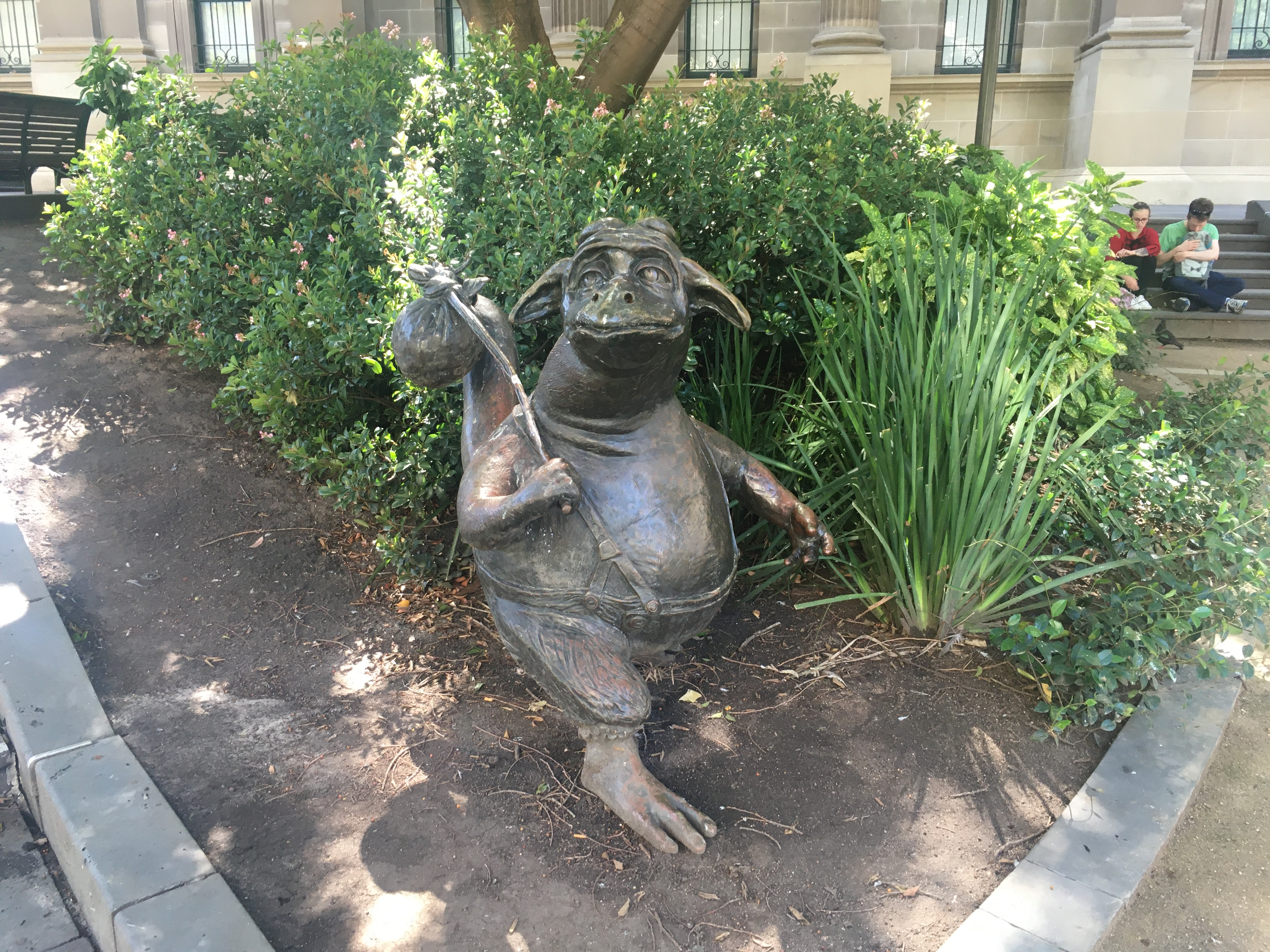
The Bunyip of Berkeley's Creek

She was awarded Children's Book of the Year awards in 1974 and 1978.

In 1991 she was awarded a two-year fellowship from the Australia Council's Literature Board.

A bronze statue The Bunyip of Berkeley's Creek by Ron Brooks is mounted by the forecourt of the State Library of Victoria.

== Publications ==
- The Werewolf Knight (1972) illustrated by Karl Holmes
- Peter and the Zauberleaf (1973), illustrated by Giulietta Stomann
- Aranea (1974) with illustrations by Ron Brooks, was "highly commended" in the 1976 Picture Book of the Year awards. but called "drab and uninteresting to children" by a reviewer.
- Hannibal (1974)
- The Bunyip of Berkeley's Creek (1974)
- John Brown, Rose, and the Midnight Cat (1976, new edition illustrated by Ron Brooks 1978) Winner, Picture Book of the Year, 1978. and co-winner, Children's Book Award at the (New South Wales) Premier's Literary Awards. It was produced as a puppet play in 1983. A German-language edition Oskar und die Mitternachtskatze was published in Munich in 1991.
- The Nimbin (1978) Adapted for puppet theatre in 1993.
- Jo-Jo and Mike, Thomas Nelson 1982; illustrations by Anne James
- Goanna (1989) illustrated by Noela Hills
- Message from Avalon 1990 Jam Roll Press, Brisbane.
- Amy's Monster (1991)
- The Sourdough Cookbook 1992
- On Writing Books for Children Allen & Unwin.
- Motor Bill and the Lovely Caroline (1994)
- Cassidy's Magic (2001)
