= The Bunyip (musical) =

Australian musical

- The enchantment of fairy princess Wattle Blossom
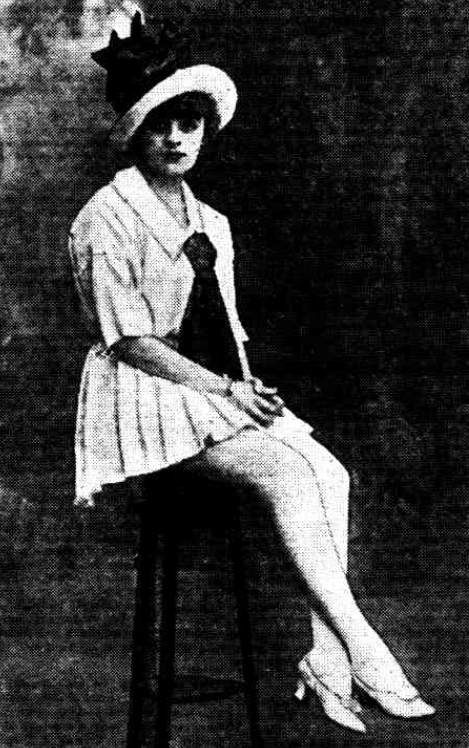
- Queenie Paul dressed as principal boy 'Jack'
- Music: Herbert De Pinna; Vince Courtney; Fred Monument; Marsh Little; James Kendis
- Lyrics: Herbert De Pinna; Vince Courtney; Fred Monument; Marsh Little; James Kendis
- Basis: Original Australiana by Ella Airlie
- Productions: 1916 Adelaide; 1917 Sydney; 1917 Melbourne; 1918 Brisbane; 1920 Perth; 1922 Adelaide; 1924 Melbourne; 1924 Sydney

The Bunyip, also known by the longer title The Enchantment of Fairy Princess Wattle Blossom, was written by Ella Palzier Campbell (a.k.a. Ella Airlie). The pantomime was a highly successful musical comedy that toured Australia for a decade within Fuller Brothers theatre circuit. The show was produced by Sydney entrepreneur Nat Philips. The premiere of the show ran for at least 97 performances and was revived several times over the following decade.

== Production history ==
Music was supplied by a number of Australian stage personalities including Vince Courtney, Herbert De Pinna and James Kendis. A Melbourne National Gallery student P. Cohen was enlisted to paint the sets with Australian flowers, namely wattle and waratah, on costumes also.

=== Venues ===
- 1916 Grand Opera House, Sydney
- 1917 Princess Theatre, Melbourne
- 1917 Majestic Theatre, Adelaide
- 1918 Brisbane Empire
- 1918 Victoria Theatre, Newcastle
- 1924 Sydney Hippodrome

== Synopsis ==
The story opens with a bushfire in which all the bush creatures are bought out into the open. Then it deals with the wanderings of princess Wattle Blossom, who falls into the hands of the Bush Gnomes, a proud race with a terrible way of doing things. The Lord High Gnome decrees that the Princess shall be turned into a bunyip, and this transformation takes place on the stage. The fairy princess is then rescued by the principal boy from the race of bush gnomes. A well-received stage effect was a shadow play of girls apparently disrobing behind a backlit screen, over which the (apparently) removed clothing was thrown.

The play relied heavily on comic stereotypes of the time, including a Chinese cook, bumbling Jewish clowns, fierce Aboriginal warriors, and a drunken Australian lout – all contending with Wattle Blossom, the fairy princess in the original story.

== Musical numbers ==
- Bunyip / words & music by Herbert de Pinna
- Wattle blossom time in Australia / words and music by Fred Monument; arranged by Geo. Hurdle
- For you / words & music by Marsh Little
- Nulla nulla / words & music by Marsh Little
- I love you / words & music by Herbert de Pinna
- Mean old moon / Ella Airlie
- Back to Kosciusko / words and music by Ella Airlie
- Joan / words & music by Marsh Little
- Bills' enlisted / words by R. Boyer and H. de Pinna; music by Herbert de Pinna
- If Captain Cook could come to life to-day / words by Con Moreni; music by Nellie Kolle & Con Moreni
- Sonny mine / words & music by Herbert de Pinna
- Down in Australia / words & music by Marsh Little
- Nathan : sung by Roy Rene / by James Kendis
- My Chinee girl : the favourite one-step song / words and music by Vince Courtney
- Grey hair grey eyes / words by Nat Phillips; music by Bert Reid
- Safety first / words and music by Henry T. Hayes – Dancers drilled by a child actor
- Mother waratah / words & music by Marsh Little
- Bunyip waltzes / arr. by Albert Evelyn
- Pierrot and Pierrette / lyric by Jean Lenox and Ray Sterling; music by Leo Edwards
- Swinging along to Henty / words & music by Henry B. Hayes; ukulele arr. by P. P. McGrath using Bishaw's method
- All I want is a cottage, some roses, and you / by Chas. K. Harris

== Characters ==
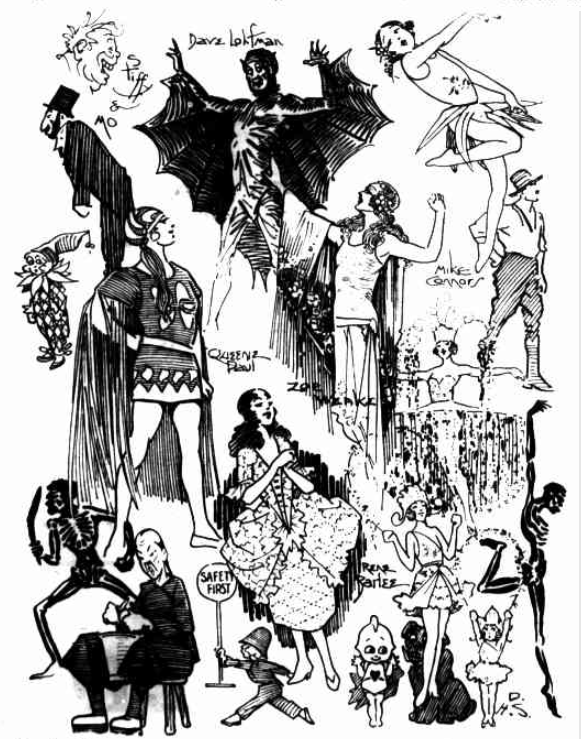

- Wattle Blossom – a fairy princess
- Wattle Blossom's attendant
- Chief Gnome
- Joan – principal 'girl'
- Jack – principal 'boy'
- Squatter Hadfield
- Mrs Wiggins
- Ah Fat (Chinese cook) played by Vince Courtney
- Swaggie swagman
- Extras – An Aboriginal corroboree and bush sprite dancers
- Arthur – a halfwit
- Tower – a lofty fellow
- Comedy duo 'Stiffy and Mo'

== Cast ==
The cast changed across several venues. For example, in Adelaide the crowd was treated to a boomerang thrower safely tossing weapons above their heads

- Nat Philips (producer) and Roy Rene played Stiffy and Mo.
- Peter Brooks originally played the Swaggie, but was replaced by drag Swagman impersonator Nellie Kolle.
- Villiers Arnold played the Gnome in the Sydney production at the grand opera house
- Pearl Ladd played the bunyip at the Sydney performance
- Ella Airlie (the writer) played Jack the principal boy opposite Queenie Paul as Joan the principal female lead. Dan Dunbar and Zoe Wencke joined the team later.
- Roy Rene continued the comic character 'Mo' he had developed in vaudeville
- Caddie Franks played the transformation into a Bunyip

== Critical reception ==
The play was embraced with patriotic fervour. From 1917, the show drew crowded houses. The theme song was adopted by schools in New South Wales and sales of the sheet music were phenomenal.

The press was unaffected by a typical Australian workers dispute between management and two stage hands who objected to the behaviour of a backstage colleague.
