= Spaghetti Confetti =

Australian children's group

- Origin: Sydney, Australia
- Genre: Children's
- Years active: 2022–present
- Labels: Lots and Pots
- Members: Ceeds (Christopher Duker); Yodsey; MC; Ash E; Ez
- Website: www.spaghetticonfetti.com.au

Spaghetti Confetti are an Australian children's music group formed in 2022. They released their debut album Ready Spaghetti Go in July 2026.

== Career ==
Spaghetti Confetti formed in 2022 from the ashes of Sydney ska punk band, Chris Duke and the Royals. Duker said in 2026, "A music publication a long time ago, when they were reviewing our debut album for Chris Duke and the Royals said, 'it's lots of fun and these guys are really energetic, but it's just so childish'. At the time, I was so offended and now I've looked back and gone, 'I should have just realised that they just found my audience'".

Spaghetti Confetti started as a duo with his bandmate and drummer Yods, but after a conversation with his daughter where she said "girls aren't in bands", the duo recruited their female partners.

In 2024, Spaghetti Confetti were nominated for the Best Newcomer at the Australian Children's Music Awards.

In July 2026, they released their debut studio album, Ready Spaghetti Go. It debuted at number 67 on the ARIA Albums Chart.

== Discography ==
=== Albums ===
List of studio albums, with selected details
Title	Album details	Peak chart positions
Title	Album details	AUS
Ready Spaghetti Go	Released: 24 July 2026; Label: Lots and Pots (LOTSANDPOTS020)	67
