= Bertie the Bunyip =

Children's TV show character

Bertie the Bunyip (~1960)

Bertie the Bunyip was the lead puppet character on the popular American children's television series The Bertie the Bunyip Show which aired on KYW-TV (known as WPTZ until 1956, then WRCV-TV from 1956-1965) in Philadelphia, Pennsylvania, which ran from 1954 to 1966. He was portrayed as a brown-colored character with the ears of a kangaroo and a duck-bill-type snout. For children he was cute and friendly, getting into harmless situations.

Created by Australian born and raised ventriloquist Lee Dexter (1904-1991), Bertie was a bunyip (a mythological Australian creature), described by Dexter as "a cross between a bunny, a collie dog and a duck billed platypus."

Bertie's enemy was an aristocratic fox by the name of Sir Guy de Guy (who bore a resemblance to Pinocchio's "Honest John"), and his friends included Nixie the Pixie, Humphrey the white rabbit, Winnie the Witch, Poochie the Pup and those terrible twos Fussy and Gussy.

A newspaper article published shortly after his death featured an interview with Lee Dexter, who noted that Sir Guy was named after the ubiquitous TV Guide - but this turned out to be just another bogus attempt to cash in on the notoriety of Dexter's puppets, and there was a protracted struggle for ownership of the puppets. Dexter suffered from Alzheimer's Disease in his later years and was confined to a nursing home in southern New Jersey; he was unable to shed any light on his puppets including who should get them.
