= Vince Courtney =

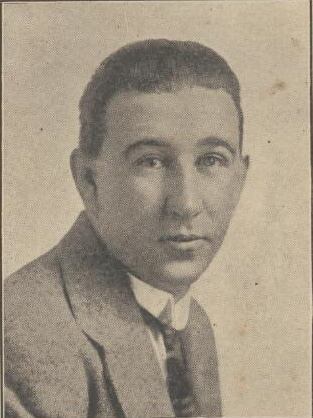
- Vince Courtney 1914

Background information
- Born: Sydney, New South Wales, Australia
- Died: January 1, 1951
- Occupation(s): Composer, Singer, Ragtime Pianist
- Years active: 1900-1951

Vince Courtney was an Australian songwriter, entertainer, singer and radio personality during the vaudeville era. Born in Newcastle, New South Wales in 1887. He was prominent in the early twentieth century. He was born in Newcastle, New South Wales. Although it is unusual for an Australian artist, Courtney was regarded as universally published and a household word from his gramophone recordings and radio broadcasts

He often performed with his wife, Eva. For several years he was a key member of impersonator revue Stiffy and Mo, with fellow vaudeville personality Roy Rene. He contributed songs to pantomime The Bunyip (1916). Many of his songs were written for other leading variety performers.

On 17 August 1951 he collapsed in a Dubbo hotel lobby and died suddenly. He is buried in Randwick, New South Wales.

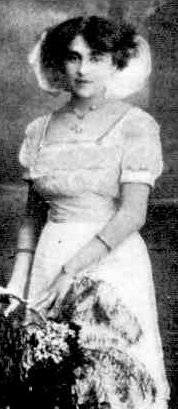
Queenie Paul appeared with Vince Courtney in THE BUNYIP

== Works ==
- The Silver in My Mother's Hair
- Back to Virginia
- Dear Old Mother Machree
- The Cold North Sea
- There never was love like mother's love
- That little home among the hills – Orchestrated for sextet
- She was like the blue in heaven
- Our flag never shall come down
- Boggabri
- Mexico
- Corroboree Rag (1916) in The Bunyip Pantomime

== Recordings ==
- Isobel (1927)
- That little home among the hills (1920)
- My Home (1925)
- Jane O'Hara (1925)
- 1962 The Silver in My Mother's Hair with Slim Dusty
