= Herbert De Pinna =

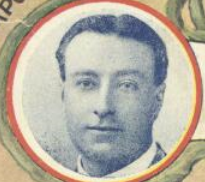
- Herbert De Pinna 1914

Background information
- Born: 1883; Brisbane, Queensland, Australia
- Died: 1936 (aged 52–53)
- Occupation: Composer
- Years active: 1910-1936

Herbert De Pinna (1883–1936) was a composer and medical doctor. He was a medicine graduate from Cambridge University who trained at Middlesex Hospital. He opened a hospital in Queensland, but claimed he made more money from music.

Herbert De Pinna is best remembered for Broadway-style numbers written for successful pantomimes The Bunyip and Robinson Crusoe, which toured major Australian cities. A song from the 'Bunyip was adopted by schools and enjoyed phenomenal sales

De Pinna won a successful Supreme Court case for defamatory remarks made to his medical clients.

During world war two, his son Arthur was shot down and killed by Imperial Japanese Army Air Service over Kupang, Indonesia.

== Works ==
- Seven songs for the 1914 musical Bunyip (musical)
- I Wonder
- The Parsons' Glide : two-step & one-step
- Claire : graceful dance
- Dorothy : old English dance
- Eight interesting pianoforte solos
- Devil's Picnic : for piano
- E'er Dawns Another Day
- Moonlight Surfing
- All the Girls are After Me
