= Hugh D. McIntosh =

Australian entrepreneur

Hugh Donald McIntosh
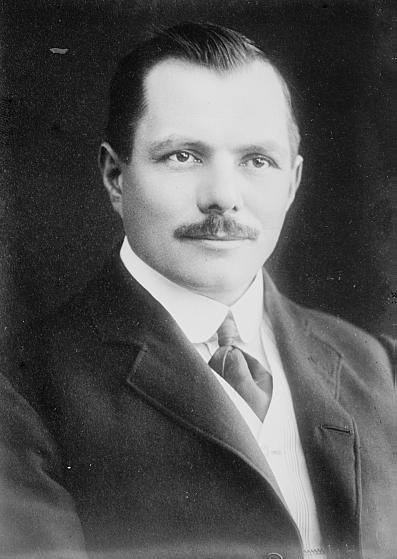
- Born: 10 September 1876; Surry Hills, New South Wales, Australia
- Died: 2 February 1942 (aged 65); London, England
- Occupations: Theatre entrepreneur, sports promoter, newspaper proprietor

Hugh Donald "Huge Deal" McIntosh (10 September 1876 – 2 February 1942) was an Australian theatrical entrepreneur, sporting promoter and newspaper proprietor

== Early life ==
McIntosh was born on 10 September 1876 to Hugh Fraser McIntosh a Scottish-born policeman and his Irish-born wife Margaret Benson in Surry Hills, Sydney, Australia. At the time Surry Hills was a ramshackle suburb with a reputation for crime and vice among the largely Irish immigrant population. His father died when he was four. He was educated by the Marist Brothers when it ran the boys school at St Mary's Cathedral in Sydney from 1883 until 1910. In an interview for Triad (a show-business periodical) in 1925 he gave a more colourful account of his early life. He claimed to have run away to Adelaide as a silversmith's assistant at the age of seven, to have worked for BHP at Broken Hill at nine, then a variety of occupations culminating in working for a surgeon at twelve. Certainly by seventeen he was a chorus boy in a Maggie Moore pantomime Sinbad the Sailor in Melbourne.

== Sports promotion ==
McIntosh was working as a barman in Sydney in 1897, and began selling pies at sporting venues, by the age of 26 he was the owner of a catering company, then in an audacious leap that was to become a trademark, embarked on sports promotion. First it was cycle racing, notably seven-day events, while he was secretary of the League of New South Wales Wheelmen. He also secured a contract with the American World Sprint Champion cyclist Marshall Taylor that saw him race in Australia between 1903 and 1904.

Then came boxing. McIntosh established a company "Scientific Boxing and Self-Defence Limited", with himself as governing director. Hoping to capitalise of the presence of the US Great White Fleet in August 1908, he hurriedly built the huge open-air Sydney Stadium at Rushcutters Bay to stage a boxing match between local champion Bill "Boshter" Squires and World champion Canadian Tommy Burns. On Boxing Day 1908 he staged a world championship heavyweight title fight between Burns and Jack Johnson. He made a huge profit from seat sales and Cosens Spencer's film of the bout, which he took to Britain and America. In 1912 be built an enclosed octagonal roofed stadium at Rushcutters Bay to a design by Thomas Pollard Sampson. The venue seated up to 12,000 people and at the time McIntosh said that the Stadium was "the largest roofed-in structure in the world". He sold his stadium business to his referee, the famous sportsman Reginald "Snowy" Baker who, with John Wren, went on to develop a chain of stadiums. Author Peter FitzSimons asserts that McIntosh attempted to sign a US management deal with the Australian boxer, Les Darcy but, when Darcy declined, McIntosh threatened, in retribution, to prevent any fights Darcy might attempt in the USA. FitzSimons suggests that when Darcy made his controversial trip to the US, McIntosh made good his threat and successfully enlisted the assistance of several state governors to ban the Darcy fights.

From 1914 to 1917 he sponsored the trophy "Hugh D. MacIntosh Shield" for the New South Wales Rugby League premiership.

== Theatre ==
McIntosh, by 1917 had moved in to theatre, and headed a consortium that acquired the Harry Rickards Tivoli theatre chain, but was careful to retain Rickards' style (and company name: Harry Rickards Tivoli Theatres Ltd.), but adding an Adelaide Tivoli, then building a Brisbane Tivoli in 1915, designed by Henry White. To compete with the Fuller Brothers and James Cassius Williamson he imported international stars such as Gene Greene, Lew Fields, Ada Reeve, W. C. Fields (then billed as "the world's greatest silent comedian") and George Gee and expanded the Tivoli repertoire to include musical comedy with the vaudeville, pantomime, Lee White - Clay Smith revues and melodramas such as "The Lilac Domino". In 1920 he produced Australia's first musical comedy F.F.F., written by Mildura-based dried fruit millionaire (and Tivoli shareholder) Jack De Garis with music by Reginald Stoneham. It failed to attract critical or popular support and may have been a factor in De Garis' eventual suicide. A transport strike caused him to lose money on an expensive production of Chu Chin Chow and he was forced to sell the lease to Harry Musgrove, though retaining his newspaper interests. The Musgrove venture failed, leaving the way open for J. C. Williamson ("The Firm") to take over running the chain.

In 1927 he took a revival of the 1909 Edward Locke play "The Climax" to London, apparently a good production, starring Dorothy Brunton, but in an inadequate theatre, and it closed after three weeks.

== Publishing ==
In May 1916 he acquired the Sunday Times newspaper, which became the major advertising medium for his theatres. With his purchase of the Sydney Sunday Times, McIntosh acquired the sporting weeklies The Arrow and The Referee. In 1915 he started advertising his own theatrical weekly The Green Room Magazine, nicknamed "The Tivoli Bible", employing Zora Cross as drama critic. He sold his Sunday Times interests in 1929.

== Decline ==
J. C. Williamson Tivoli Theatres Ltd was losing money by 1929 and ceased rental payments to Harry Rickards Tivoli Theatres. Interest in the "talkies" was waning and McIntosh returned to producing revues for the (Melbourne) Tivoli and Princess, and the (Sydney) Haymarket and St James in a desperate attempt to generate an income. "The Follies of 1930" (with a cast that included Roy "Mo" Rene), "Pot Luck", then "Happy Days" (with a young Robert Helpmann - billed as "Bobby Helpman, burlesque dancer") and "Sparkles", while trying to keep at bay creditors such as heiress Mrs Ben Shashoua (née Joan Norton, daughter of John Norton) as the value of his assets shrank with the advance of the Great Depression. Hopelessly insolvent, Harry Rickards' Tivoli Theatres Ltd folded the following year. Mrs Shashoua's solicitor later admitted to helping engineer McIntosh's bankruptcy.

In December 1930, Sydney "Truth", a weekly newspaper founded by John Norton, published an article on the life and loves of McIntosh, calling him an "erstwhile pieman" who had "drained the life-blood" from the Sunday Times. McIntosh successfully sued for libel but was awarded damages of just one farthing. In the course of proceedings it was revealed that he had transferred £66,703 from the account of Sunday Times Ltd, of which he was managing director, to Harry Rickards Tivoli Ltd of which he was governing director in an attempt to keep the Tivoli chain solvent.

== Politics ==
McIntosh championed NSW Labor Premier (also "bosom friend" and business partner) William Holman in his newspapers. He contributed generously to the party (he was characterised by Jack Lang as "Holman's political fixer") and in 1911 was promised a seat in the New South Wales Legislative Council. This he was finally granted in 1917, but though using the honorific "MLC" in all his advertisements, he took little part in debates. In May 1932 McIntosh was forced, as a bankrupt, to relinquish his seat.

== Other ventures ==
- He acted as agent for Teesdale Smith in tendering for major government contracts;
- For a time he dabbled in movie projection; one film he promoted was the Italian classic Cabiria.
- He managed a guest house "Bon Accord", adjacent to Norman Lindsay's home at Springwood in the Blue Mountains after the death of its owner, jeweller businessman Stuart Dawson.
- In 1935 he opened the "Black and White Milk Bar" in Fleet Street, London. It proved highly profitable, but when he expanded it into a chain, the enterprise foundered.

== Personal life ==
In 1897 McIntosh married art teacher Marion Backhouse. She was to remain at his side to the end, through financial crises and numerous infidelities, notably with actress Vera Pearce. He was life governor of many NSW hospitals and charitable institutions; he was a founder of the Australia Day Committee and the Sydney Millions Club and at one stage president of the Returned Sailors and Soldiers Imperial League of Australia and a fellow of the Royal Empire Society.

His wife also led an active social life. She travelled several times to the United States with Mrs Holman, was prominent in patriotic organisations the Vaucluse branch of the Red Cross Society, in hospital fundraisers, sporting circles, notably as longtime president of the New South Wales Ladies' Amateur Swimming Association and its 1932 Olympics Committee. She was also prominent in the English-Speaking Union

His last years were spent in England, where he died in a London hospital and was cremated.

He could inspire great loyalty among his acquaintances. Nellie Stewart, in her memoirs, wrote "When I hear people talk slightingly of this big man I cannot bear it, for he was the most generous of men, and he was at all times far more likely to suffer from brigandage than to resort to it. He was of little less than medium height, broad in the shoulders, cheery in the eye, hiding under a rattling loquacity the fact that he was shy as a girl, a man all aglow with enthusiasm like a happy boy. He was electric. He had the oddest happy knack of getting out of all his people the best that was in them."

== References in popular culture ==
His 1903 import of the black champion cyclist Major Taylor for the Sydney Thousand competition was depicted in the 1992 TV mini-series Tracks of Glory, from the book by Dr Jim Fitzpatrick. Richard Roxburgh played McIntosh.
