= Francis Stewart Briggs =

Australian aviation pioneer

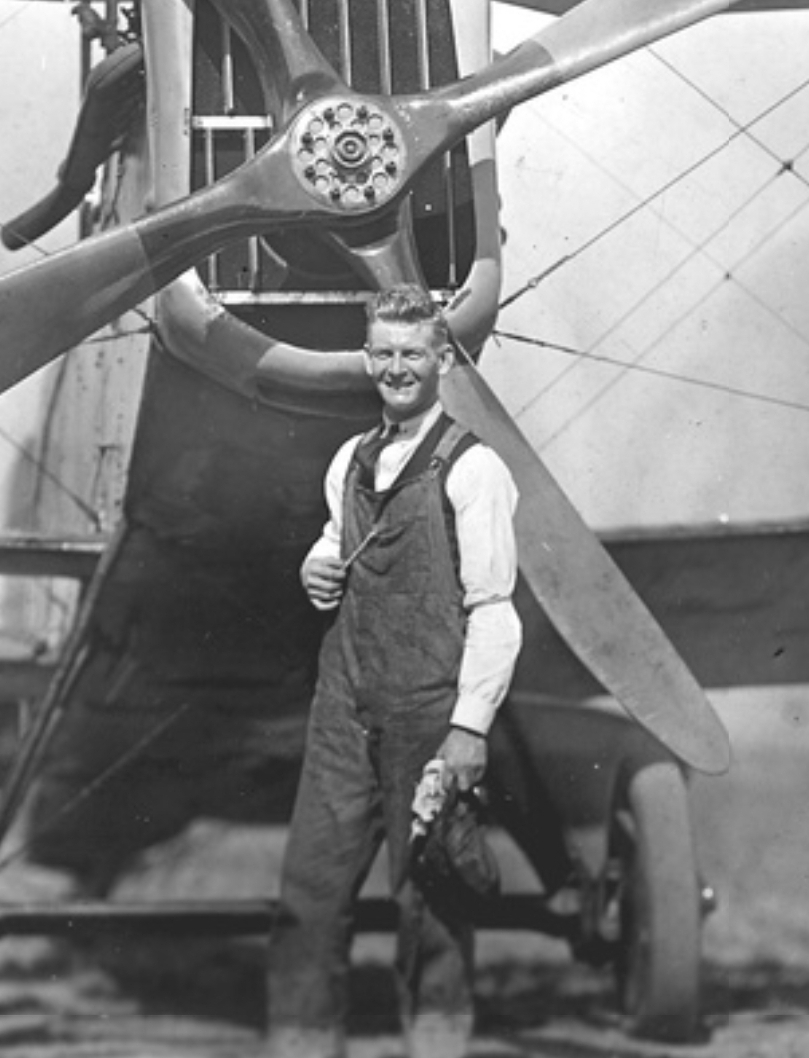
- Francis Stewart Briggs standing in front of his D.H.4 aircraft in 1921
- Born: 1897
- Died: 1966 (aged 68–69)
- Military career
- Branch: Royal Flying Corps

Francis Stewart Briggs (18 September 1897 – 21 July 1966) was a pioneering Australian aviator. Frank Briggs learnt to fly with the Royal Flying Corps in the First World War. During the Peace Conference in 1919 he flew delegates between London and Paris and was the personal pilot of Australia's Prime Minister, Billy Hughes. On return to Australia, Briggs flew with C.J. De Garis and in 1922 joined "Jimmy" Larkin's "Australian Aerial Services" (AAS) company, headquartered at Hay, New South Wales. Frank Briggs married Miriam Carter in Hay on 3 August 1926. Later he joined the Shell oil company, taking charge of a new aviation department in Perth.

== Early years ==
Francis Stewart Briggs was born in Fort William, India, on 18 September 1897. His parents (both widowed) had married in at St Andrew's Church in Calcutta on 30 April 1895. His father, George Howard Briggs, who worked as a (non-musical) Conductor with the British Indian Army in the Bengal Ordnance Department, died in Allahabad of fever on 5 June 1897, three months before Francis was born. After service as governess to the household of the Raja of Dhar (Raja Udaji Rao Puar), Eliza Briggs (née Eldridge) and her son moved in 1909 to Saint Helier, Jersey, in the Channel Islands then in 1912 to Adelaide. Before the war, Briggs was a telegraph operator at the Adelaide GPO.

(George Howard Briggs' first wife was Elizabeth Eleanor Sophia Ross, born 5 February 1857 in Umballa, India. They married on 13 September 1883 in Ferozepore, India. She died in Rawalpindi on 26 December 1888. Eliza Eldridge's first husband was Francis O'Hare, an army tailor. They married on 13 May 1883 in Battersea. Francis O'Hare died on 21 March 1892 at Fort William, India.)

== World War I ==
=== First Australian Imperial Force ===
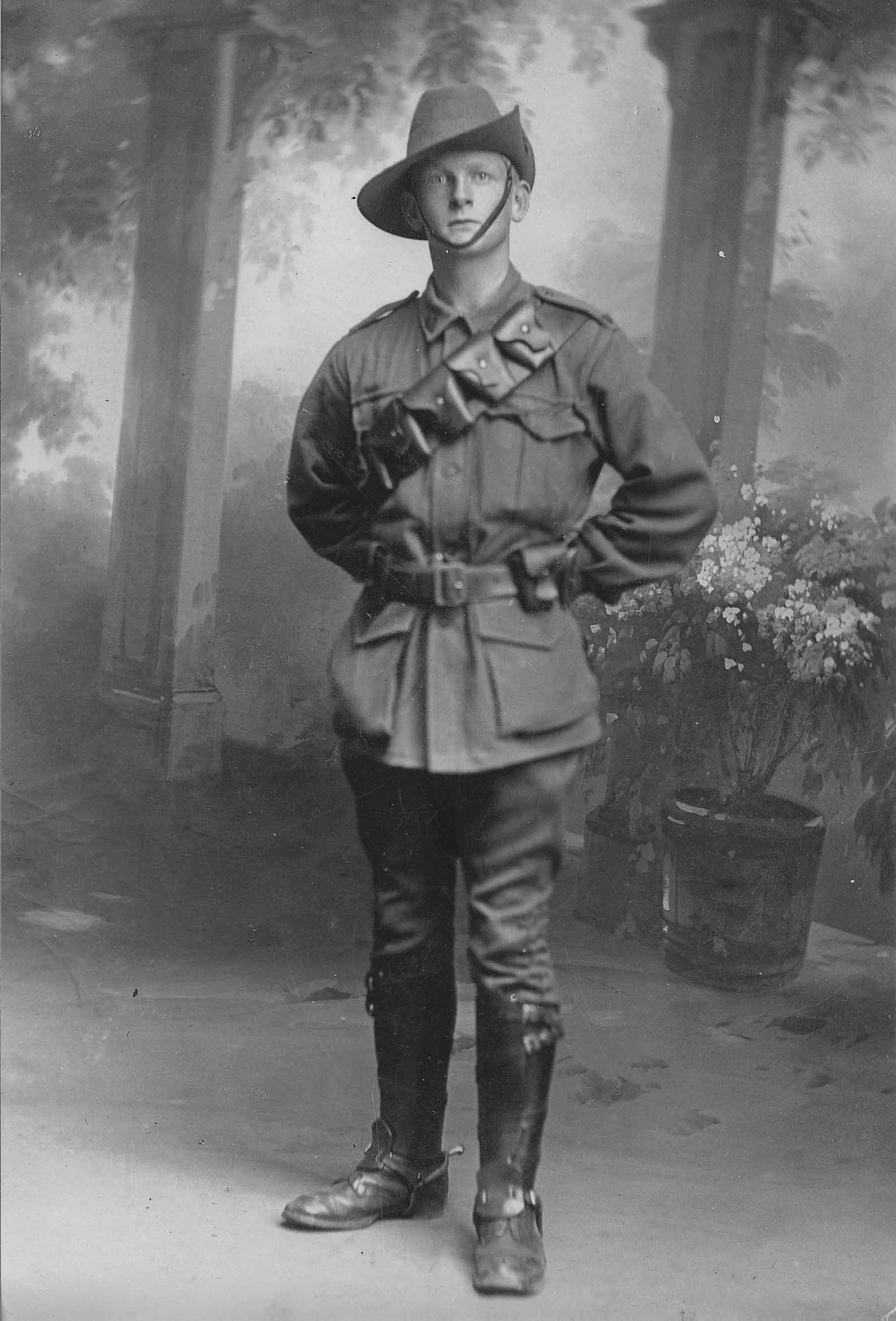
Francis Stewart Briggs, at Adelaide in January 1916, Signaller with 3rd Light Horse Regiment of 1st Light Horse Brigade of Australian Imperial Forces.

Briggs enlisted on 23 August 1915 as a signaller with the Australian 3rd Light Horse Regiment of the 1st Light Horse Brigade and embarked from Adelaide on 11 January 1916. In Egypt he transferred to the 111th Howitzer Battery of the 4th Division Artillery when that division was formed after the evacuation of Gallipoli. By May 1916, he was in France (at Croix du Bac near Steenwerck) with the AIF as a Wireless Operator and Signalman.

On 2 June Briggs was attached to No.16 Squadron RFC at La Gorge aerodrome in France for six weeks. This attachment was to develop co-operation between the RFC and the artillery using air to ground wireless radio, then still in its infancy. Briggs was selected for the task because he had knowledge of the area which he had picked up during forward O.P. (observation post) duty. His first flight in a plane resulted in his first crash. On this flight he was to be observer for a young English pilot with about 18 hours solo flying experience. On take-off they flew into a hedge bordering the aerodrome and ended up hanging upside-down in their seats. Neither crew nor plane were seriously damaged; an ox was not so lucky. Briggs' job with No. 16 Squadron was to observe and range for the artillery. Before take-off in their BE2c the plane crew tested and warmed their guns. With cameras, ammunition and four Cooper bombs on board it often took twelve to fifteen minutes to reach 2,500 feet, with the plane travelling at 75 miles per hour. They conducted the shoots at 5,000 to 7,000 feet altitude and up to five miles behind the lines, depending on the type of gun and the target.

The aircraft normally carried out the shoot alone, but if it was an especially important operation then a flight of fighters were assigned to provide top cover. The fighters at this time were mostly Sopwith Pups, Bristol Scouts, DH1s, DH2s and the FE8. At this time the RFC did not have a synchronised gun. Briggs' first combat was a "no decision show". The pilot was Captain Brown (later Major Brown MC). They were conducting a shoot when attacked by an Albatros D.II scout. The Albatros had better speed, better climb and a synchronised gun. The BE2c had two guns. One was set at an angle to fire outside the propeller arc and was operated by the pilot. The observer, who sat directly behind the engine, had a gun mounted on the fuel tank which separated him from the pilot. He could fire in an arc between the wing tip and the tail plane. Then, unless he wanted to cut the pilot in half, he had to lift the gun up then drop it down on the other side. Captain Brown decided that discretion was the better part of valour, and they "scootered for home". Brown and Briggs gained three "probables" but none were confirmed. The only German aircraft types Briggs encountered at this time were the Albatros D.II, the Fokker Biplane and the Halberstadt.

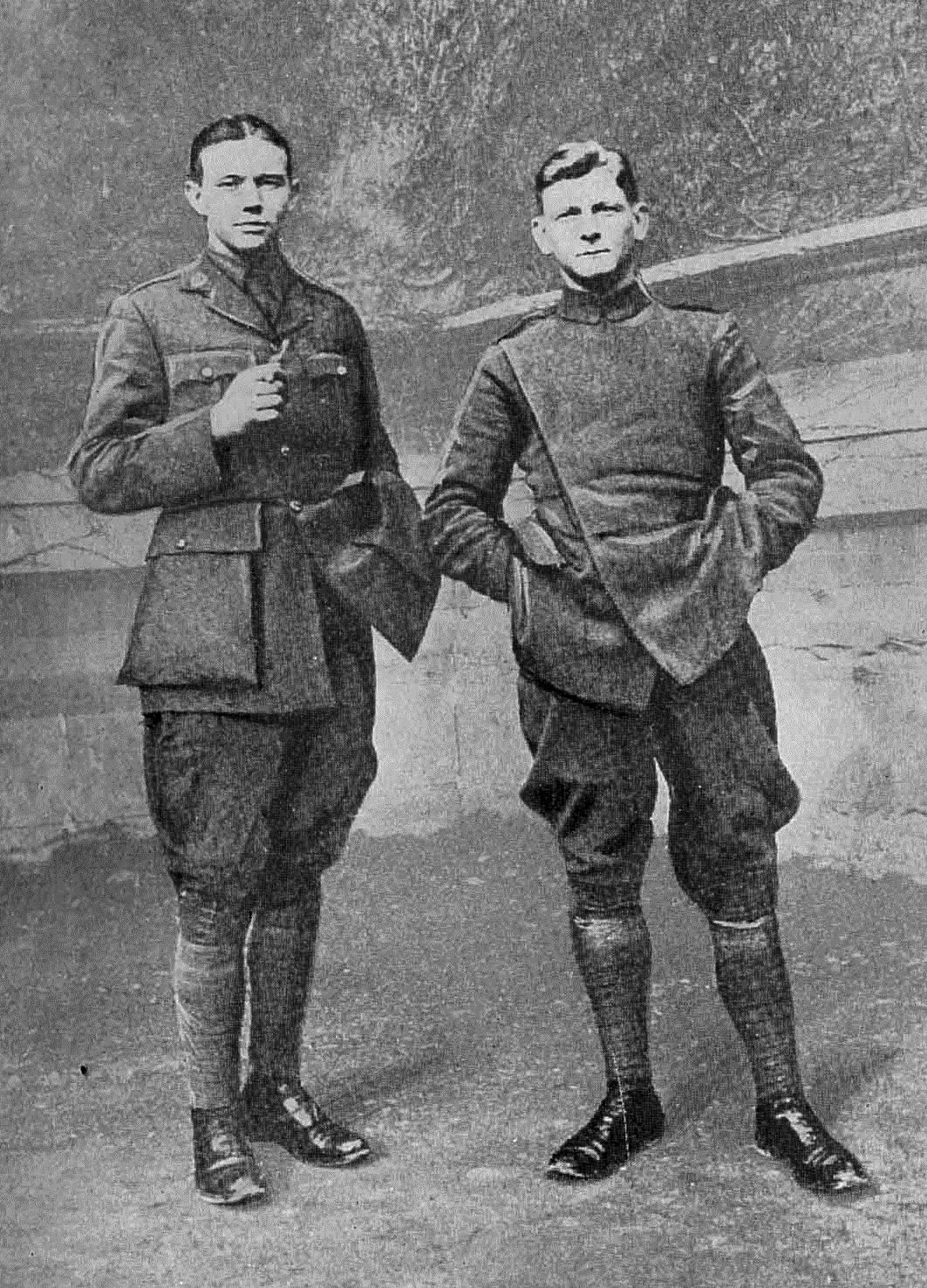
Edgar Johnston and Frank Briggs (on right) when cadets at Oxford in 1916

No. 16 Squadron had four flights of seven aircraft, all BE2c's powered by the 90 h.p. RAF factory engine. These engines required constant replacement (Briggs reported). After six weeks, during which Briggs had learnt to love aircraft and flying, he returned to his unit. In October a circular was promulgated that sought volunteers from the AIF to be Royal Flying Corps pilots. Briggs and, as he put it, 99.99 recurring percent of the AIF, applied. On 7 November Briggs was among about 250 members of the Division invited to interviews with RFC "brass hats". The men soon realised that a good education and sporting prowess were regarded favourably, so the RFC officers must have thought that every Australian Olympic athlete and university student was in the AIF. On 13 November Briggs learnt he had been selected by the Royal Flying Corps. Two other men were selected from Briggs' division (4th Division) at this time – Charles Kingsford Smith and Edgar Johnston, all three survived the war.

=== Royal Flying Corps ===
==== Training ====
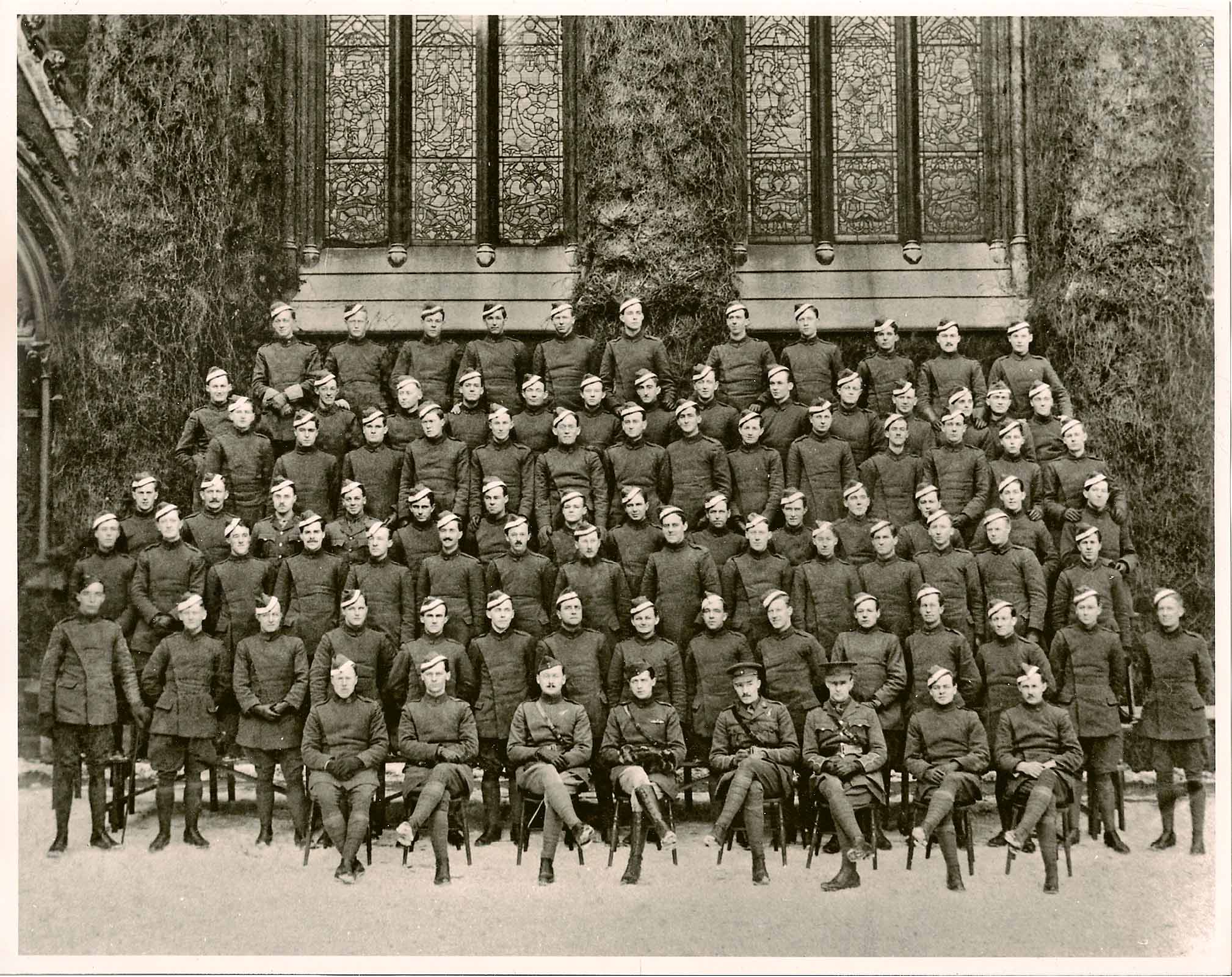
Oxford, England, February 1917. Formal large group portrait of instructors and part of the first group of 200 Australian cadets from the 1st AIF to attend a School of Aeronautics training course after they had volunteered to train as pilots for the Royal Flying Corps (RFC). Briggs is second from the left in the second row.

Initial training, starting November 1916, was at Denham, Buckinghamshire. This training continued at Oxford from January to March 1917. The cadets were quartered at various colleges. Briggs was at Exeter College, where his roommate was Edgar Johnston. In a lecture room on 2 February Briggs' eyes started to smart badly, and he felt very unwell. It turned out he had German measles and he spent a few days in hospital. Several other cadets joined him, including Percival Moody (who years later was an air-mail pilot for Qantas). On 10 March all the cadets succeeded in their examinations and passed out from Oxford. On 17 March Briggs was simultaneously honourably discharged from the AIF and admitted to the RFC as a second lieutenant.

On 24 March Briggs was in Thetford to start training (with No. 25 Training Squadron) on an aircraft, the Maurice Farman Shorthorn, known as a "Rumpty". His instructor was Captain Foggin. On 15 June, after twenty hours of flying solo, Briggs was amazed to receive orders to report to a training squadron (No. 52 Training Squadron) in Stirling as an instructor.

==== Scotland ====
On 30 July Briggs was introduced to his first six pupils. First in the air was a gentleman named Pitt-Pitts, believed by Briggs to be great-grandson of the famous British statesman Pitt. On 19 August Briggs crashed his Martinsyde Elephant aircraft. He and other members of the squadron had been in the habit of flying very low over the local golf course on their return, a practice the CO had banned. The procedure involved hopping across traffic on a road bordering the aerodrome, plus a wall separating the road and the aerodrome. On this occasion Briggs hurdled a car on the road, but then noticed that the car was the CO's and saw his enraged face staring out. Distracted for a split second he forgot about the wall, had to climb almost vertically, stalled and crashed on the aerodrome side of the wall. Briggs walked away without a scratch but with badly bruised feet. The CO was so relieved Briggs was OK that all he did was shake his head at him and he walked away speechless.

The squadron relocated from Stirling to Montrose, where a fighter squadron No. 80 Squadron of Sopwith Camels was being formed. On 2 October Briggs was flying a De Havilland IV bomber when he noticed a Sopwith Camel using him as a practice target. He responded in kind, engaging the Camel, flying the De H. IV as if it were a fighter. When he landed the CO of No. 80 Squadron (Major Graham, an Australian) offered Briggs a place in his squadron, an offer which delighted Briggs (who was keen to see active service).

==== Suffolk ====
Briggs' hopes were soon dashed. Major Graham had started the transfer process, but Briggs learnt on 10 October that higher authority had decided he be transferred instead to the RFC Test and Experimental Station at Orfordness. Briggs recorded that Orfordness was regarded by pilots as "a very hush-hush show where high priests perform aerial magic". Briggs was at Orfordness on 14 October. The CO, Major Norman, had invented a machine-gun sight that made firing reasonably accurate for the average pilot. In the mess Briggs was introduced to two Oxford dons and a Cambridge don (one of whom, Captain Fairbairn, he later taught to fly). On the base he was delighted to discover another Australian, Lieutenant Wackett (the very resourceful Lawrence Wackett, who later invented a very efficient anti-aircraft gun sight).

The reason he was posted to Orfordness was to conduct experiments in cloud flying (later known as blind flying) and aerial navigation. He was told that bad weather in France was restricting flying operations, if more pilots could get above the cloud on dirty weather days then more bombing could be carried out inside German territory. At this stage cloud flying was an unknown art, nobody could tell Briggs much about it. He depended on the standard rev. counter, airspeed indicator, inclinometer and compass. After two days at the station Briggs was joined by four more pilots who had been assigned to research cloud flying. These were Bell and Montmorency (Canadians) and Powell and Weller (Englishmen). They were soon able to fly through ten or twelve thousand feet of cloud in reasonable formation (Briggs recorded in his diary).

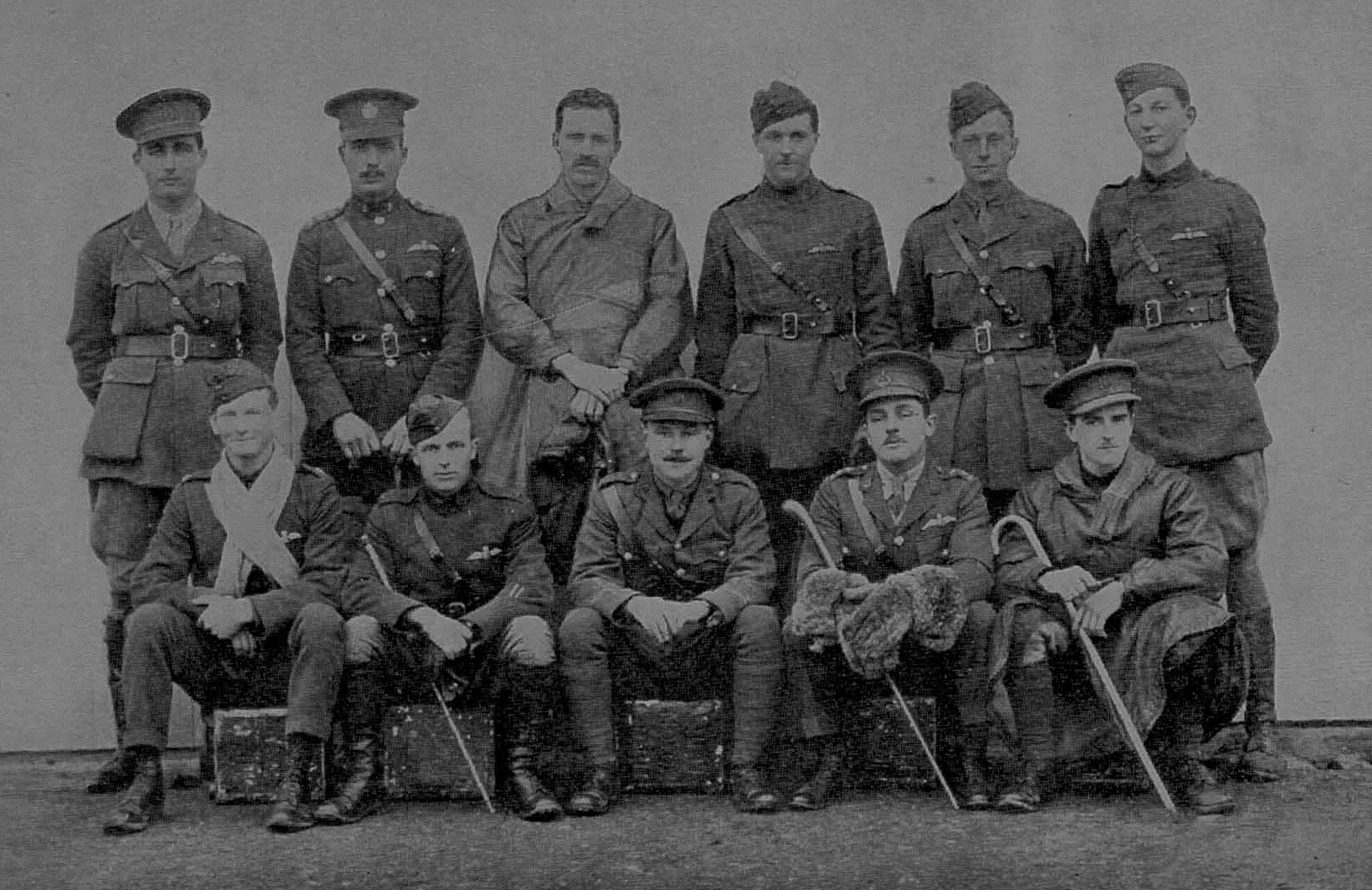
The original experimenters in Cloud Flying at Orfordness Test and Experimental Station in 1917. Standing (left to right) : 2nd Lieut. Weller, Capt. Bell, Staff-Captain Bouidillon, Lieut. Barrett, Lieut. McKerrow, 2nd Lieut. Troubridge. Sitting (left to right) : 2nd Lieut. Briggs, 2nd Lieut. Horwood, Lieut. Fairburn, Lieut. Montmorency, Lieut. Duncan

The squadron also acted as an unofficial Home Defence squadron. German raids on London passed over Orfordness on their way out and on their way back. Four months earlier a Zeppelin had been shot down by a station pilot. On the night of 19 October Briggs was part of a "reception committee" sent out to "welcome" some German visitors. Word was received that some Gotha bombers would soon pass overhead. Briggs took off in a B.E.12a and climbed to 15,000 feet, the height at which he thought the bombers would cross the North Sea. It was pitch black, and cold and miserable after cruising around for an hour or so, Briggs was starting to believe that the Gotha report was a "furphy". Then, for a fleeting second, he saw a flicker of flame, like a "will o' the wisp", then all was black again. After what seemed like an eternity he saw it again "obviously a tiny flame from an exhaust pipe .. about half a mile in front of me and slightly below". When he got closer he saw its (the flame's) twin and knew for certain he was behind a Gotha. Now, however, the tiny exhaust flames were becoming fainter. The Gotha was faster than Briggs' plane, he had only gained on it while diving from a higher altitude. Briggs fired a long burst, hoping the range was not as great as it looked, but the Gotha proceeded out of sight. The next morning the flight sergeant said "It certainly wasn't your fault that Hun got away!" and showed Briggs the throttle lever that he had bent trying to get more revs out of the engine.

Another function of the Orfordness station was "proofing" every batch of bombs for delivery overseas. From every batch of 250 bombs, four were tested on a concrete target on the beach. If one failed to explode the whole batch was scrapped. On 5 November Briggs recorded an event involving Lawrence Wackett. Wackett had been up proofing some 112-pounders. He heard three detonations, but not the fourth, and assumed this was a dud. The fourth bomb was still partially attached to the bomb-carrying rack. It detached when the aircraft received a bump as Wackett was about to land. The machine went up on its nose, then over on its back. A startled Wackett climbed out of the wreckage. Two weeks later (on 18 November) Briggs had his own scare while proofing. He dropped a 360-pound bomb on the target from about 60 feet height. Two things then happened. The blast under the tail put the plane into an almost vertical dive position, and there was a loud "wham" from the aircraft. A piece of bomb casing had torn a fist-sized hole through the aircraft. As Briggs put it "six inches in the wrong direction and I would have had difficulty in sitting down for some long time". He resolved to drop bombs from a minimum height of 2,000 feet.

==== Wiltshire ====
The Air Ministry came up with a scheme to pass on the knowledge gained at Orfordness to other pilots. A squadron titled "No. 1 School of Aerial Navigation and Bomb Dropping" was to be set up at Stonehenge on Salisbury Plain. On 5 December Briggs, a corporal and six men were the first to arrive to set up the school. They were quartered for the time being at an infantry camp nearby. At this stage it was an aerodrome in name only, there were "no hangars, no nothing. At some time or other somebody has set up a bloody big heap of massive stones likely to prove obstructions on the edge of the drome". Four days later some Bessonneau hangars arrived for Briggs' team to erect. Another four days later (13 December) not one hangar was erected. Each morning they found the fierce winds of the plain had scattered the hangar they had erected the previous day across the aerodrome. On 17 December the remaining personnel for the school arrived and hangars started going up "like the price of wine". Briggs was delighted that George Powell, Sammy Weller and Dit Montmorency turned up to be fellow instructors.

Close to the aerodrome at Stonehenge there was an Observation balloon School. On 23 January 1918 Briggs sent out a student pilot, Turner, to fly a triangular compass course at a height of 4,000 feet. The Observation Balloon School had a balloon up at 7,000 feet. Turner was so intent on his compass that he did not notice the cable tethering the balloon. The cable cut deeply into his right hand wing. The impact was such that the aircraft turned "on to its back" and started to slide down the cable, spinning rapidly around the cable. This continued till the machine was only five or six hundred feet off the ground. At this point the spinning motion flung the machine off the cable, and the machine was at the same time thrown right side up. It went into a glide and landed with no further damage on a piece of cleared ground. When some nearby artillery men ran over they found Turner still in his seat, but unconscious. When he recovered he stated that he had blacked out after the first three spins.

The men from the balloon school spent much of their spare time at the aerodrome, scrounging joy rides. Briggs and company tried to "cure them by doing everything we knew in the air". This just increased the "balloonatics" appreciation, leading to invitations to visit their mess and to ascend in a balloon. One day (29 March), after repeated invitations, some forenoon drinking and a good lunch, George Powell and Briggs were persuaded to step into the basket of a balloon to get a "still air" view of the country. The balloon ascended to about 4,000 feet and Briggs found it novel to be at that height and not be deafened by the roar of an engine. Their enjoyment ended abruptly when their host said "What about a jump?". Before they could demur they each had a parachute harness buckled on and were receiving unheeded advice. On asking what would happen if something went wrong, Briggs was told he told he could take the parachute back to the Equipment Officer and get another one. To prevent the grin of his host from getting any wider Briggs closed his eyes and flopped off the basket. A sharp jerk caused him to open his eyes, and he was astonished to see the basket just 150 feet above him. After letting rip at his tormentor with some "pure bullocky Australian" language, Briggs found he was enjoying the most wonderful sensation he had ever known. He was so intrigued at the stillness that he held his watch to his ear, and heard it ticking away merrily. After a rather heavy landing Briggs vowed, with George Powell, not to go within miles of a kite balloon outfit for a very long time.

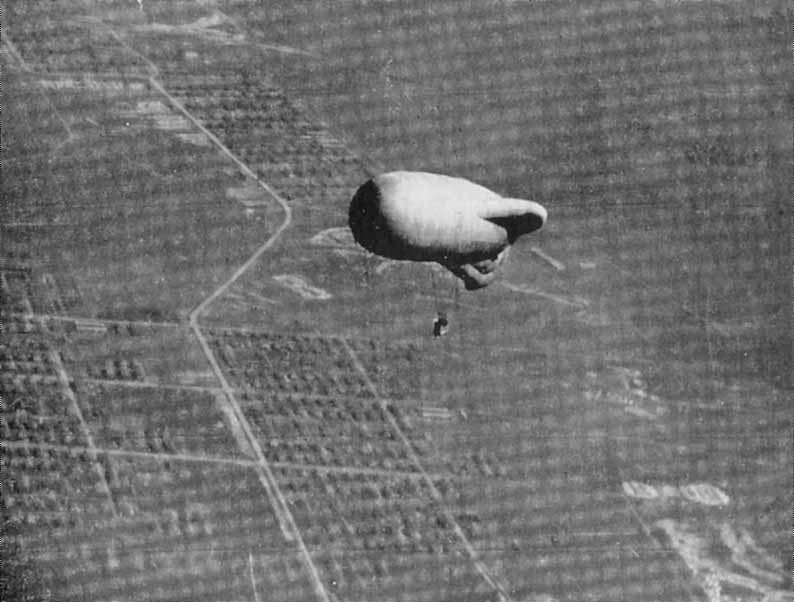
The kite balloon 4,000 feet above Salisbury Plain from which the RFC's Francis Stewart Briggs parachuted on 29 March 1918.

=== Royal Air Force ===
==== Wiltshire ====
Briggs was flying with his observer, Lieut. Peterkin, a Canadian, on 2 May when there was a bang. The rear cylinder head separated from the engine and the part with the spark plug went straight through the side of the petrol tank, igniting it. Fortunately Briggs, who was looking over the side of the "bus" at the time, saw the explosion out of the corner of his eye. He automatically switched off and put the aircraft into a vertical sideslip. The sideslip fanned the flames away from the fuselage and in less than a minute the flames were extinguished. After one more minute they landed safe, but badly scared, on an artillery parade ground.

Briggs made repeated attempts to get posted to a service squadron, but the result was always negative. On 18 July he planned to go before a medical board to complain that Britain's cold and wet weather was aggravating his malaria, and suggest that he be posted to a warm climate such as Palestine. On 3 August he went before a medical board, with which he was honest about his application. On 19 August he received orders to report to Cairo, Egypt, where he would receive instructions regarding which squadron on the Palestine front he was being posted to.

==== Egypt ====
Briggs spent his 21st birthday (on 18 September) at Helouan in Egypt. His instructions had been to report to General Borton commanding the R.A.F. in the Middle East. In this interview Briggs received a rude shock. The Air Ministry had advised the general to use Briggs' talents in a new school, No. 3 School of Aerial Navigation and Bomb Dropping at Helouan, similar to the one at Stonehenge, that had been set up just before Briggs' arrival in Egypt. All protests were cut short, but the general conceded that he would only keep Briggs at the school for six months. After that he would be posted to whatever service squadron he elected.

Helouan was a pleasant spot. Before the war it was a popular tourist resort, its main attraction being the sulphur baths. There was also a former hotel in which enemy aliens were interned. Briggs visited the building several times, playing games of bridge with cultured and charming Germans and Austrians. He pitied the way the internees of both sides were incarcerated, ruined and humiliated.

General Borton must have remembered Briggs because in November, immediately after the Armistice, Briggs was ordered to return to England, to the great envy of those left behind. He lost no time in obeying this order, but between Cairo and Alexandria he developed Spanish flu. In six hours he became delirious and unconscious, and was taken off the train and into hospital by stretcher. For four days he remained in that state. When he came to he had one thought, to join the ship he was due to sail in, which was to leave in two days' time. He was due to stay in hospital for another two weeks, followed by a week in a convalescent camp. On the day he managed to evade the hospital authorities and get aboard without interference. Back in England at the end of January 1919 Briggs conceded he had been foolish not to accept the medical advice, he was still unwell at that time, many weeks after leaving Egypt.

==== Hampshire (Andover) ====
On arrival in London Briggs reported to the Air Ministry who posted him to "No. 2 School of Aerial Navigation and Bomb Dropping", which was formed at Andover, Hampshire, just before Briggs left for Egypt. At Andover, regarding this posting, Briggs wrote on 30 January 1919 "I feel too ill and weak even to laugh". Because of the Armistice, Andover was effectively a school in name only, a place where people marked time and waited to see what would happen next. It was a perfect place for Briggs to continue his recuperation.

==== Middlesex ====
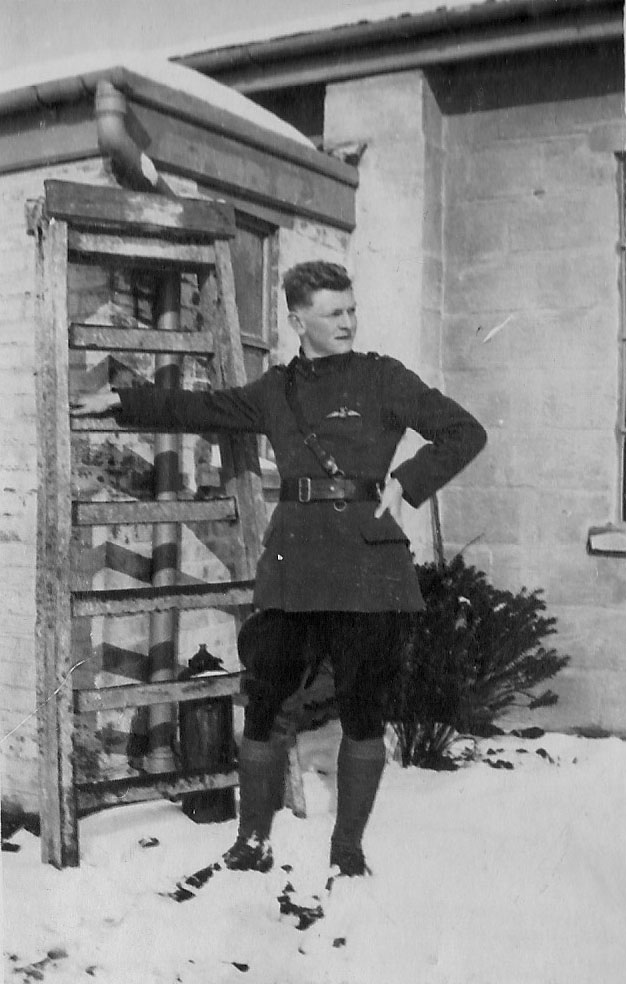
Lieutenant Francis Stewart Briggs, RAF, at Hounslow in 1919 while serving with the Demonstration Squadron

On 14 March Briggs wrote that he received instructions to report to the Demonstration Squadron at Hounslow. The squadron had just been formed "for what precise reason I don't think anybody quite knows". It was equipped with all sorts of machines imaginable. There was little organised flying. "If a couple of us feel like going up, say one in a Sopwith Snipe and the other in a Fokker D7, we just order the machines out and after taking to the air, scrap around the sky until fed up. We then land and adjourn for another gin and two."

On 3 April Briggs wrote "I was instructed to proceed to Hendon last Thursday afternoon in an Avro to give Mr. Winston Churchill a flying lesson. I duly arrived on time at that point and so did Winston Churchill. He took two looks at me, and one at a cloud overhead that started to sprinkle gentle spots of rain, then turned on his heel, re-entered his car, and drove off. I gather that he considered the weather unsuitable or that he didn't like my face."

Three weeks later, on 18 April, Briggs had one of the greatest thrills he had ever had. Major Barker V.C., who visited the squadron a couple of times, took Briggs on in mock combat. Though suffering the disability of a wound in one arm, he won Briggs' respect as a great pilot. Briggs got in a position to put in a very short burst, but believed this was because Barker let him.

==== Surrey ====
On 26 April Briggs was at Kenley. He had been ordered there to join the newly formed Communication Squadron (part of 86 Wing), who were to act as couriers between London and Paris, carrying delegates and dispatches to the Paris Peace Conference. On 2 May Briggs flew the King's Messenger Captain Blood to London with the final draft of the Peace Treaty for ratification by King George V, then flew Blood and the treaty back to Paris that evening. They flew by moonlight over a fog which extended from ten miles inland from the English coast to about twenty miles inland from the French coast.

On 12 May Briggs was proud to have Australia's Prime Minister, William Morris Hughes, as his passenger for the first time. They flew from Buc, Paris, for London with Hughes' private secretary Percy Deane and important dispatches. The weather was beautiful when they took off. About 50 miles from the French coast they ran into low clouds. They flew above them, but about 30 miles further on Briggs realised it was fog, not cloud. Briggs decided to descend through the fog to find an aerodrome where he could phone for a weather report before crossing the Channel. He expected about 200 feet clearance between the fog and the ground, but there was less than fifty feet. Briggs had to make a tight vertical turn to avoid some poplar trees, which they missed by inches. They landed in a field and two or three soldiers ran towards them. They were clearly Australians and Briggs asked them where exactly they were. "Beside No 11 Australian Hospital, Abbeville" came the reply. Quick as a flash Hughes said "I can see you recognise me, boys. Take me along to your C.O. I have come especially to visit the hospital". While Hughes toured the hospital, Briggs got on the phone and learned that the fog extended right across the Channel and over half of England. This put paid to any ideas of reaching London and Briggs decided to sneak along below the fog to an aerodrome near the coast. He collected Hughes and Deane and after half an hour of hedge-hopping and tree-dodging they landed at Maisoncelle aerodrome.

Maisoncelle was occupied by No. 110 Squadron RAF, equipped with DH9a's. They were running an air mail service from Maisoncelle to the Army of Occupation in Germany. A fresh weather report showed the fog had worsened and they decided to spend the night there. The CO (H.R. Nicholls) apologised to Hughes that the only bed he could offer was just a wooden frame with wire netting stretched across it to form a mattress. At breakfast next morning Hughes reported that, though he suffered from insomnia and had had no real sleep for weeks, he had slept like a top. He ascribed this to the flying, not the bed. Unfortunately the fog was denser than the day before. It was decided that Hughes and Deane would be motored to Boulogne from where they could get a steamer to cross the Channel. Briggs would attempt to fly to Marquise aerodrome near Boulogne. On arrival at Boulogne Hughes would phone Marquise to see if Briggs had arrived. If so Hughes would travel to Marquise, as Briggs was confident he could reach London if he could get through to Marquise.

The CO at Marquise, Sidney "Crasher" Smith, was astonished to see Briggs, as he did not think any aircraft could be flying that day. Hughes learnt that Briggs had arrived at Marquise, and promptly came to the aerodrome. Hughes and Briggs were both in for a shock as "Crasher" was adamant that he would not permit the flight. Eventually he persuaded Hughes to continue by boat. He omitted to notify London and Paris of this decision. As a result, there were fears that Hughes, Deane and Briggs had perished in the Channel. A steamer came across the wreckage of a plane in the Channel. A wheel removed from the wreck identified it as a DH4, the type of machine Briggs was flying. Briggs' flight was the only one likely to be crossing the Channel that day, so it was concluded the wrecked machine was Briggs'. After Hughes arrived in London the fears for his safety were dispelled, only to be replaced by conjecture as to the occupants of the mystery machine. After much enquiry it transpired that Jefferson, an RAF pilot, had been sent to the Netherlands to pick up Henrickson, the Dutch food controller, and fly him to London. They had crashed and drowned in the fog over the Channel.

At Buc on 27 May the RAF were guests at the French Flying Corps mess. Briggs wrote "They are excellent hosts, and one of the best was Georges Carpentier, the world's light and heavyweight boxing champion. I am one of the very few who can claim victory over this redoubtable one. I laid him low last night". A cockfighting contest was held in the mess. The RAF Wing Commander, Colonel Harold Primrose, with Briggs as jockey staggered to the finals to be matched against Carpentier who was mounted on the hefty adjutant of the French outfit. After a great and lengthy bout Carpentier's mount tripped on the mat and the RAF team were declared the winners.

On the afternoon of Saturday 28 June, Briggs and three companions from the Communication Squadron were flying above the Palace of Versailles waiting for "zero hour". As 3pm approached they got into "line ahead" formation and, precisely on the hour, dived down and flashed past the windows of the Hall of Mirrors. The roar of the engines, as the planes thundered past a few feet away, drowned out the first few sentences of Clemenceau's opening speech. That evening the Communication Squadron flew news copy and photos over to England for the London press.

On the morning of 14 September the weather in France was atrocious. The wind was hurricane force, clouds were almost down to ground level, visibility was about a hundred yards and there was heavy driving rain. Briggs was anticipating a day in Paris with his colleagues, and was just about to leave when he was called in to see the CO, Major McCrindle. Briggs was told that it was imperative that Major-General Seely reach London that day, "if humanly possible". Would Briggs "have a go at it"? From Paris to Boulogne they flew no higher than fifty feet and were thrown about like a leaf. When they reached the coast they found the clouds were right down to the water. Briggs was tempted to land at Marquise aerodrome but, knowing the urgency of his passenger's mission, decided to try climbing above the cloud which was unbroken for 8,000 feet. The Channel and the English coast were invisible. Near Redhill Briggs found a break in the clouds, and wriggled across the Hog's Back into Kenley. On arrival he was asked if he had flown through the railway tunnel that runs through the Hog's Back. Briggs wrote that "I may have for all I know, because I was practically flying blind half-in and half-out of the clouds with the undercarriage wheels scraping the trees and house tops".

Briggs was looking forward to partying in London when an orderly informed him that Colonel Primrose wished to see him. The Wing Commander told Briggs that there were urgent dispatches for Paris, and that, as Briggs had just done the reverse journey, he was the pilot most likely to get through. The return trip to Paris was worse, "a condition of affairs I didn't think possible". The average wind speed was over 70 m.p.h. gusting to more than 100 m.p.h. and there were vertical gusts. Neither coast nor the Channel were visible and the landing was in the dark by the aid of flares which the rain almost extinguished.

==== Hampshire (Winchester) ====
From October to December Briggs was at the RAF Repatriation Camp at Flowerdown, Winchester, which was commanded by Squadron Leader D.C.G. Sharp.

== Inter-War years ==
On 26 February 1920 Briggs was back in Adelaide, considering his future. Billy Hughes had invited Briggs to return to Australia with a view to joining the Australian Flying Corps, but as Briggs wrote "everything concerning our Air Force is most unsettled". Commercial aviation seemed to Briggs the better option, but at this time commercial aviation was little more than a range of possibilities.

In March Briggs was in Melbourne. Two or three small companies and a few individuals there were offering joy-rides, but in Briggs' view the local outlook was not promising. While joy-riding kept the public "air-minded" it risked alienating the public because fares were very high even for short flights. "Something's got to be done to get civvy flying on its feet. But what is that something?... Wish I knew how !" Briggs wrote.

In May Briggs was back in Adelaide, still wondering and waiting. The position seemed very bleak to him.

On 26 June Briggs read in his newspaper about C. J. De Garis who was visiting Adelaide on business. The paper stated that he intended to use a plane to save time, as he had to travel between centres hundreds of miles apart. Briggs called on de Garis at the Grand Central Hotel. Within a few minutes of them meeting, de Garis told Briggs he was just the chap he was looking for. Mr de Garis promised to advise Briggs whether the job was his soon after he arrived in Melbourne. He left for Melbourne by train that afternoon. Two days later Briggs heard that the job was his, and was on the train to Melbourne the same day. Mr de Garis had already bought a machine, a Boulton and Paul 90 h.p. RAF V8, and Briggs felt his first task was to persuade Mr de Garis to replace this with a DH4. In test flights at Glenroy on 3 July Briggs viewed the Boulton and Paul as "a nice little machine with a fair turn of speed", but not rugged enough for the work ahead.

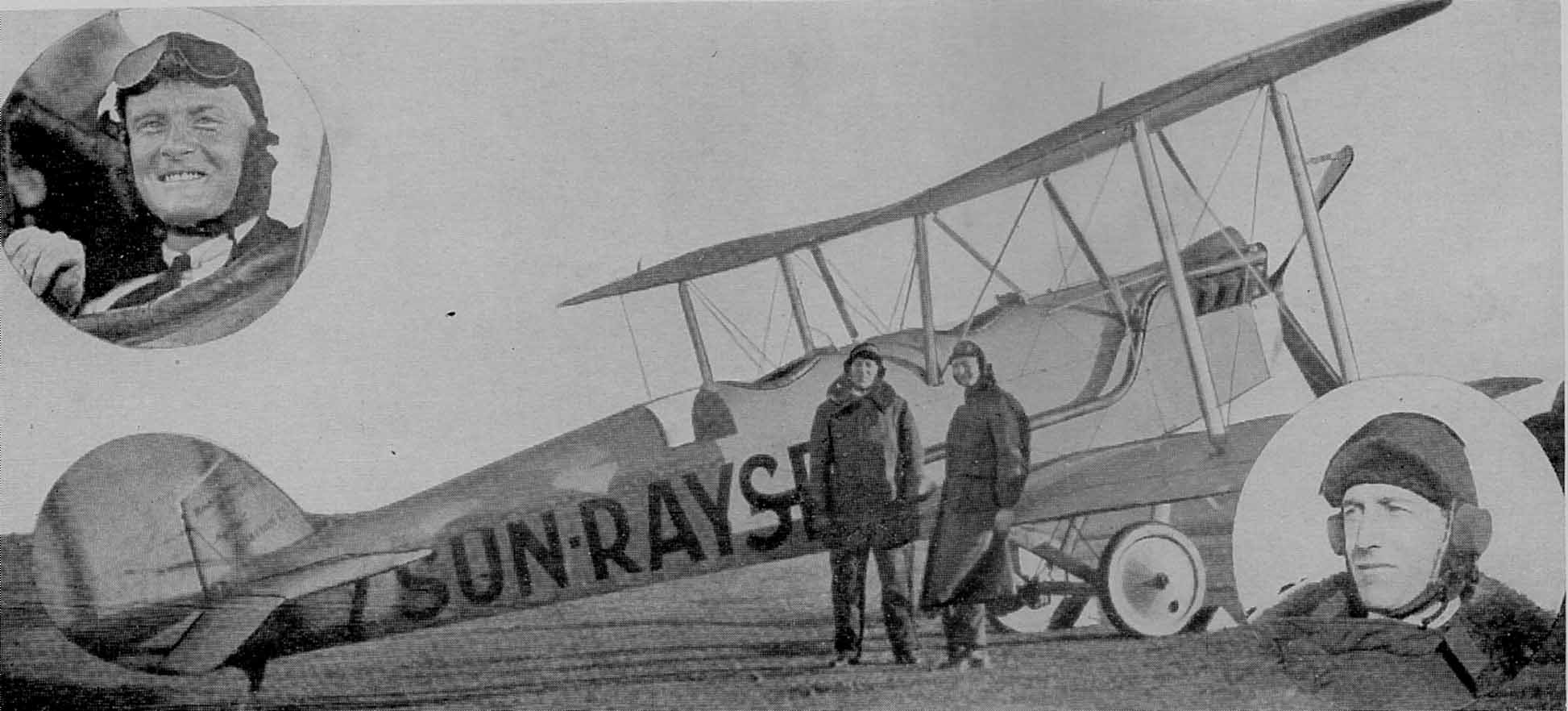
Francis Stewart Briggs (left inset) and Clement John de Garis (right inset) in front of their Boulton and Paul P9 aircraft, July 1920

On 6 July Briggs made his first trip to Sydney, with de Garis as passenger. They flew from Mildura (de Garis' base) and reached Goulburn at dusk. Briggs had promised de Garis that he would be in Sydney that night so they pressed on for the aerodrome at Mascot, which would have flares out for a night landing. When they reached Picton Briggs saw what looked like a jewelled shawl ahead – Sydney. The relief of sighting Sydney was soon followed by the anxiety of not locating Mascot aerodrome. The staff at the aerodrome must have headed home for belated dinners, thinking that Briggs was not coming. Briggs had no knowledge of Sydney, they had half an hour's fuel left, it was dark and they were in a machine not fitted for night flying. Briggs had not seen an instrument for the last hour and a half, he was flying entirely by horizon, formed by lights on the ground. A plan started to develop in his mind to land in the water near one of the lighted jetties. Suddenly he spotted what appeared to be an open field with a pool of water in the middle of it. The water reflected the lights from an elevated railway station nearby. He throttled back and manoeuvred to land on one side. The reflection of the lights in the water helped reveal the ground level. Two or three blurred objects flitted past the undercarriage, then they were down, with a slight bump. A man with a lantern came running over. "Where are we?" de Garis asked. "Canterbury Racecourse" was the answer. The next day Briggs, with de Garis, flew the aircraft to Mascot.

Two days later Briggs and de Garis left Sydney for Melbourne, hoping to be the first to make this journey in one day. They succeeded, in a flying time of 6 hours 30 minutes, with one stop at Cootamundra to refuel. As they approached Glenroy one of the engine cylinders blew off and they had to land in a field about two miles from the aerodrome. A rock outcrop concealed by the long grass caught the centre of the axle and the aircraft gently turned over. There was only slight damage to the aircraft. Rather than be delayed by the necessary repairs, de Garis (on 12 July) bought a Sopwith Gnu (from the Larkin-Sopwith Aviation Company), so that they could continue flying on 17 July. The crashed plane was sold back (where it lay) to Aviation Ltd, from whom it had been bought.

On 9 August de Garis received a telegram from Admiral Halsey asking him if he would meet the train from Perth at Port Augusta with his aeroplane and pilot, and fly the mail for the Prince of Wales to Sydney. The Prince of Wales was to leave Australia on HMS Renown from Sydney a couple of days before mail from England to Sydney was due to arrive. Briggs told de Garis that the limited time available made this too great a task for their "little bus" (the Sopwith Gnu) and suggested they ask the Prime Minister (Billy Hughes) for the loan of a DH9a machine from the Defence Department.

The Prime Minister was very receptive and passed Briggs on to Secretary Malcolm Shepherd. Shepherd passed Briggs on to Dicky Williams, the Commanding Officer of the Air Force. Briggs was told that his request was being granted, that the Commanding Officer would be Briggs' escort, and that another Air Force officer and machine would be sent to Mildura to act as a stand-by machine. The following day, when Briggs arrived at Point Cook, he was told his escort had left for Adelaide the previous day. Briggs asked for a mechanic to accompany him, but because Briggs was a civilian the request was refused. As mechanic Briggs took along a garage motor mechanic, Albert Smyth, whom he "recruited" at the last minute.

== Published works ==
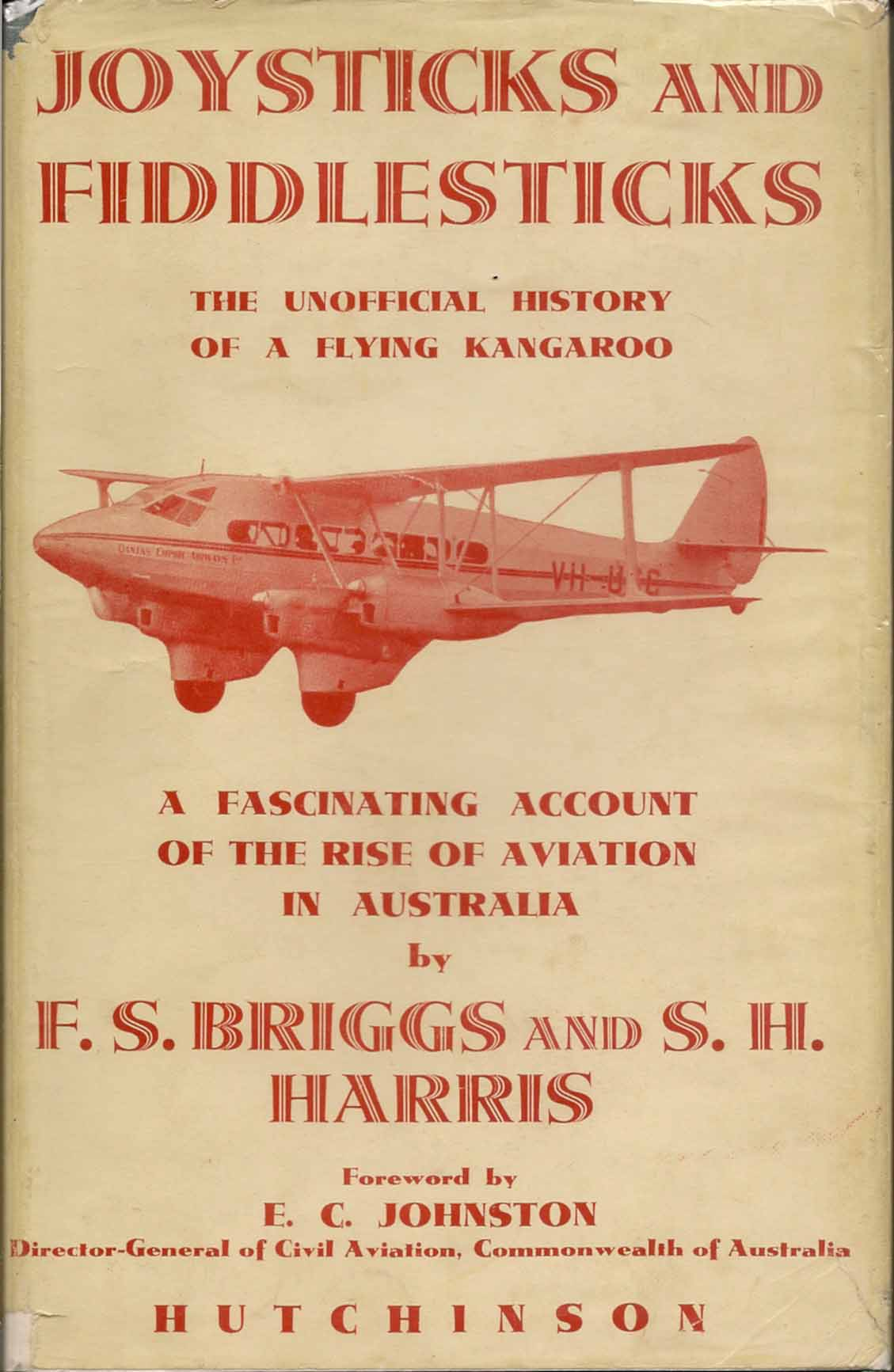
Dust jacket front panel of Francis Stewart Briggs' "Joysticks and Fiddlesticks" (1938)

- Joysticks and Fiddlesticks: (the Unofficial History of a Flying Kangaroo) Or, The Flying Kangaroo; Foreword by Edgar Johnston (1938)

== Unpublished works ==
- Albums of press clippings, letters and memorabilia; photocopies held by National Library of Australia
- An Interview with Francis Stewart Briggs

== Images ==
- Group portrait of instructors and part of the first group of 200 Australian cadets from the 1st AIF to attend a School of Aeronautics training course after they had volunteered to train as pilots for the Royal Flying Corps (RFC) (1917)
- Briggs in front of his DH4 (1921)
- First aircraft to land at Alice Springs (1921)
- First Commercial Air Flight into Sydney 25th Anniversary Dinner (1949)

== Memorials ==
- Alice Springs Airport's "Briggs Street"
- Melbourne Airport's "Francis Briggs Road"

== See also ==
- Military history of Australia during World War I
- No 1 School of Military Aeronautics – mentions No 2 School of Military Aeronautics
- Oswald Watt Gold Medal
- RAF Digby – mentions Sidney "Crasher" Smith
