= The Sunday Times (Sydney) =

Newspaper published in Australia 1885–1930

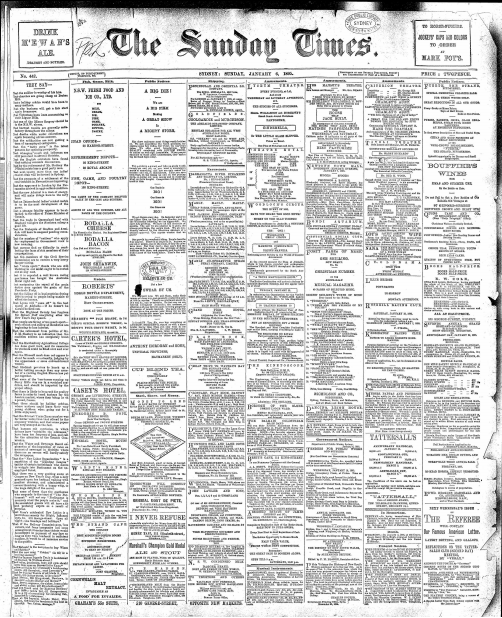
- The Sunday Times, 6 January 1895
- Language: English
- City: Sydney, New South Wales
- Country: Australia

The Sunday Times was a newspaper published in Sydney, New South Wales, Australia from 1885 to 1930.

== History ==
The Sunday Times was founded by W. H. Leighton Bailey. It was first published on 15 November 1885 by Charles Mark Curtiss, and ceased with no. 2389 on 1 June 1930.

The Sunday Times was controlled by the Evans family for more than 30 years, until 1916, when the Sunday Times Newspaper Company, as well as the company's premises, were sold to Hugh D. McIntosh. In 1927, McIntosh sold his holdings in the Sunday Times Newspaper Company to Beckett's Newspapers, with J. H. C. Sleeman as managing director. The Sunday Times ceased publication in 1930, with staff informed on 8 June.

The Sunday Times Newspaper Company also published The Referee from 1887, and later the Arrow.

== Digitisation ==
This paper has been digitised as part of the Australian Newspapers Digitisation Program project of the National Library of Australia.

== See also ==
- List of newspapers in Australia
- List of newspapers in New South Wales
