= Robinson Crusoe (musical) =

Australian musical

- Robinson Crusoe on Rainbow Island
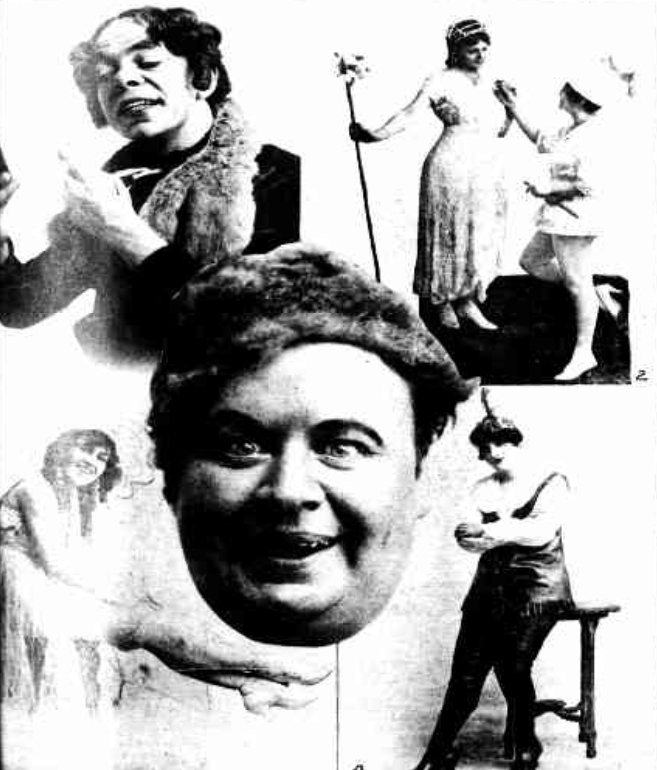
- 1917 Bill Poster
- Music: Herbert De Pinna; Bert Rache
- Lyrics: Herbert De Pinna; Bert Rache; Victor Prince
- Basis: Sequel to Robinson Crusoe by Daniel Defoe
- Productions: 1917 Sydney; 1917 Launceston; 1917 Adelaide; 1918 Brisbane; 1920 Fremantle; 1922 Adelaide; 1923 Sydney; 1924 Melbourne

Robinson Crusoe or long titled Robinson Crusoe on Rainbow Island was a musical written by Australian actor and theatre manager Victor Prince, with music supplied by Australian composers Herbert De Pinna and Bert Rache. The show was first produced in 1917 by Victor Prince in the lead role in partnership with the Fuller brothers theatre circuit. The dialogue manuscript is lost, but many of the songs remain preserved. The original production had a successful run of 112 consecutive nights at the Grand Opera House, Sydney.

== Characters ==
The cast reformed at each revival, but the main selection are these actors.

- Nellie Fallon was an attraction as principal girl Pollie Perkins
- Drag King Nellie Kolle played the principal boy Will Atkins.
- Demon of the Deep - an octopus king played by Lou Vernon
- Chorus line of Sea nymphs to dance the harlequinade.
- Pirate King - Charles Zoll
- Old Dame Crusoe - played by Walter Carnack
- Friday and Saturday - Played by comedy duo Vaude and Verne (Troop entertainers Charles Vaude and Will Verne)
- Marom Erickson and three others played native islanders

== Synopsis ==
Robinson Crusoe arrives home with a treasure map. On the voyage to hunt for the treasure, the party is sunk and marooned on a distant island. The octopus king stirs up the natives to repel the intrusion. Crusoe is rescued by the principal boy and all ends happily.

== Song numbers ==
- Rainbow land - music by Herbert de Pinna
- Kewpie's parade : two step - by Reg. A. A. Stoneham
- Oh! Mr. Robinson Crusoe - by Marsh Little
- Loves Sweet Dream - by Reg. A. A. Stoneham
- The demon of the deep / words and music by Reg. A. A. Stoneham
- Moonlight surfing / words & music by Herbert de Pinna
- The girls are after me by Herbert de Pinna
- The rainbow isle / written and composed by Reg. A. A. Stoneham

== Critical reception ==
The show was favourably mentioned by critics.
