= Sleepy Seas =

"Sleepy Seas" was an Australian hit song which was first published in 1920 by Reginald Stoneham while manager of the Melola Salon music store in Elizabeth Street, Melbourne. It was an instant popular success with dance halls. The following year sales expanded to other music publishers. This vocal waltz was used to accompany silent movies, in the era before talkies.

Australian audiences found the song lifted their spirits in times of crisis and "Sleepy Seas" achieved unprecedented sales. By 1928 it was universally known across Australia and enjoyed some global success. The song was frequently revived in musical theatre and variety entertainment, more than ten years after publication. The romantic overtones perhaps reflected gender relations in War-time Australia. It was sometimes performed in Islander style with ukulele and grass skirt.

Fortunately, the song escaped the scandals of producer Jack De Garis. Stoneham founded his own music publishing business and sold copies alongside those of fellow Australian composers.

Australia sighed with relief in 1950, as a copy of the music became the singular clue that solved a murder investigation.

The song was erroneously attributed to Australian popular vocalist Jack O'Hagan. Indeed some felt the song was an emblem of Australia.

== Recordings ==
- 1924 Kenneth Walters in ragtime style
- 1927 Metro-Gnomes Dance Orchestra Zonophone Record – 3642
- 1935 Johhny Wade in South Sea Islander style - 78 rpm recording audio online preserved at Australian National Film and Sound archive title number 156344
- 1946 the 2FC radio dance orchestra (arranged by Harold Arlen)

== Arrangements ==
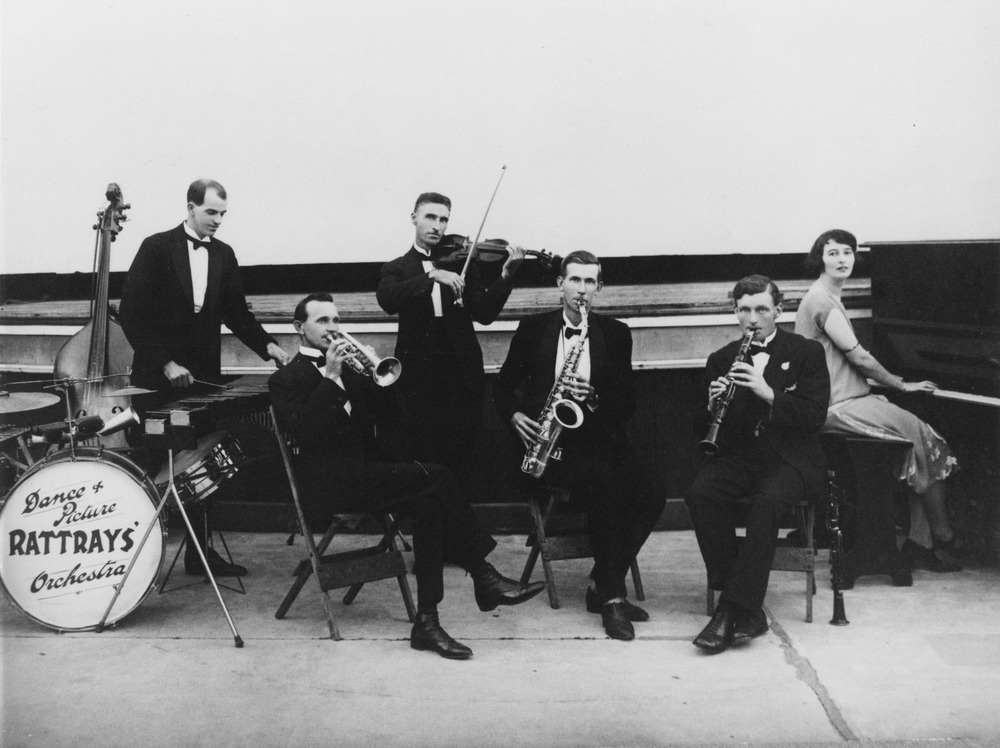
Alan Rattray's Australian silent movie orchestra

- Big Band Swing style
- Brass Band
- Jazz Sextet
- Violin trio
- Symphony orchestra
- Piano, Accordion and violin trio
- Piano, cello, violin trio

== Performances ==
- 1921 Geelong Victoria
- 1921 Haymarket Cinema, NSW
- 1922 Albany, Western Australia
- 1922 Majestic Theatre, Adelaide
- 1922 Grafton, NSW
- 1922 Sydney, NSW
- 1922 Perth Western Australia
- 1922 Forbes, NSW
- 1922 Brisbane, Qld
- 1922 McKay, Queensland
- 1923 Camperdown, NSW
- 1923 Launceston in community singing
- 1923 Adelaide, South Australia
- 1923 Cairns, North Qld
- 1923 Perth Western Australia
- 1924 Tingha, Northern NSW
- 1924 Sydney, NSW
- 1924 York, Western Australia
- 1926 Rockhampton, Queensland
- 1926 Ireland
- 1926 Tasmania
- 1927 Perth, Western Australia
- 1929 Hoyts Regent, Melbourne
- 1930 Cairns, Qld
- 1932 Broken Hill, NSW
- 1932 Mount Gambier, South Australia
- 1934 Lithgow, NSW
- 1942 Kempsey NSW with accordion trio and ballet
- 1953 Fairfield, NSW
- 1993 Canberra, ACT
- 1946 Armidale New South Wales
- 1946 Bowen, North Queensland
- 1945 Lithgow, NSW
- 1951 Dubbo, NSW

== Lyrics ==
While the wind sang a melody tender,
as it sways through the palms by the shore,
there she drooped in my arms,
with her smiles and her charms
that I'll worship forever more.

Her lips are like the heart of a rose bud,
and their sweetness is waiting for me.
Though now far away
I'll go back some day,
To a bride who waits beside,
the sleepy sea.
