= Reginald Stoneham =

Australian composer and publisher

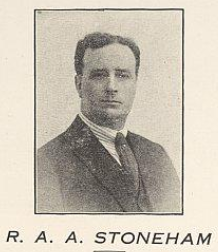
Stoneham in 1919

Reginald Alberto Agrati Stoneham (1879 – 11 March 1942) was an Australian composer and publisher of mostly topical songs, and a musical comedy F.F.F. He was perhaps Australia's leading exponent of jazz and ragtime piano styles in the first decades of the 20th century as both composer and performer. He was also a popular accompanist and recording artist.

What'll we do, when the wattle blooms again? 1929 by Reginald Stoneham

"Deva Jazz: Jazz as you like it" circa 1920 by Reginald A A Stoneham

== Biography ==
He was born in Carlton, Victoria in 1879, the fifth son of musician William (c. 1833 – 25 March 1913) and Ellen Stoneham (c. 1846 – 10 February 1889) of 210 Madeline Street Carlton. His siblings include Harry Stoneham (cornet) and Herbert Stoneham (flute) of Melbourne, also Fred and Will Stoneham, music-hall artists in London, and Elsa Stoneham, a popular contralto.

During the Second Boer War Stoneham served in the South Australian Mounted Rifles as a private trumpeter. His trade was listed as "wood turner". He was wounded in action at Slobet's Nek.

In 1901 Stoneham married Adelaide Minnie "Addie" Lyons (1880–1959). On 10 April 1902 they had a daughter Val Augusta Elsa Stoneham, who married Edward Benjamin on 29 August 1923. She opened a florist's shop on Carlisle Street, Balaclava in 1928. They divorced in 1931 and she continued to operate as a florist.

Stoneham is best remembered for the song "Sleepy Seas" and patriotic songs during World War 1, notably the popular "Heroes of the Dardanelles". Several of his songs were used in the 1917 musical Robinson Crusoe.

He lived at St Kilda, Victoria from 1918. In 1920 he composed the musical comedy, F.F.F., styled as a "mystery musical comedy", with a book and lyrics by C. J. De Garis, was underwritten by Hugh D. McIntosh. It starred Maggie Moore and Charles H. Workman, among others. The "mystery" centred on the meaning of the enigmatic title, for which solutions were solicited and a prize offered. The show played at Adelaide's Prince of Wales Theatre for a successful season, followed by a week in Perth and a fortnight in Melbourne, where The Argus's critic praised the songs but lambasted the play. It has not been revived.

In November 1929 the baritone Robert Nicholson recorded "Ballarat the Fair" and "Back to Warrnambool", accompanied by Stoneham. In March 1930 he recorded "Mildura (Home of Mine)" and in 1932 he conducted a radio orchestra in Adelaide.

Ill and unemployed, with an invalid wife and daughter to support, he petitioned for bankruptcy in 1936.

His remains were ashed at the Springvale Crematorium according to the rituals of the Returned Services League and the Church of England.

== Other compositions ==
- "All for Australia"
- "Albury" for The Weekly Times newspaper, 1932
- "The Attack (on Zeebrugge)"
- "Back Home"
- "Back to Warrnambool"
- "The Bells of Peace"
- "Bendigo" for The Weekly Times newspaper, 1932
- "Come to Mildura – the Land of Winter Sunshine"
- "Coral Isles" c. 1923
- "The demon of the deep" (in the musical Robinson Crusoe)
- "Distant Memories Waltz", 1914
- "The Drover", 1912
- "(Those) Foolish Wives", 1922
- "Football Song and Chorus" commissioned by the West Adelaide Football Club, 1911
- "For God and St George", 1914 used as a recruiting song during World War I
- "Frivolina" c. 1916
- "Garden of Rosy Dreams" featured in Hugh D. McIntosh's revue Bubbly
- "Golden Dreams", 1924
- "Heroes of the Dardanelles", 1915 recording by Peter Dawson and John Ralston
- "Home Fireside"
- "Home to Ballaarat"
- "Jazzin' the Blues"
- "Kewpie's parade : two step" (in the musical Robinson Crusoe)
- "King of the Air", 1913 as recorded by Malcolm McEachern
- "Lolita", 1928 recorded by Jack Lumsdaine
- "Love", featured in the revue Bubbly
- "Loves Sweet Dream" (in musical Robinson Crusoe)
- "Maryborough" for The Weekly Times newspaper 1932
- "Mellow Mersey Moon" for "Come to Tasmania" carnival 1927
- "Memories of a Lovely Lei" (with Barronne Kuva)
- "Mildura (Home of Mine)"
- "The Murray Moon" c. 1922 with C. J. De Garis
- "Peace and Glory"
- "Pride of the Nation: The National March of Australia"
- "Princess Betty's Lullaby" 1927 for Princess Elizabeth, later Queen Elizabeth II
- "(My) Ragtime Drummer Boy"
- "The rainbow isle" (in musical Robinson Crusoe)
- "A Road To Anywhere" 1920~1932
- "Sleepy Seas"
- "Sun-Raysed Waltz" for Australian Dried Fruits Association of Mildura, Victoria.
- "The Tango Rag" 1914
- "Tantalising Eyes" featured in Hugh D. McIntosh's revue "Lads of the Village"
- "The Tintex Girl" 1924
- "That Was a Perfect Night"
- "The Wabash Moon" c. 1922
- "Waikiki Moon"
- "The Warrnambool Waltz Song"
- "When the Wattles Bloom Again" (with Dan Leahy)
- "What'll we do when the wattle blooms again?"
- "Commerce and Heart" a radio play

as "Alberto Agrati"

- "The Hesitation Valse-tango" 1914
- "I've Got a Motorbike (waiting for you)"
- "Viceroy Tea Waltz"

== Recordings ==
- 1945 Sleepy Seas by Johnnie Wade and His Hawaiians
- 1989 Murray Moon by Slim Dusty with Anne Kirkpatrick

== Critical reception ==
Reginald Stoneham is mentioned in Australian newspapers as a well known and respected music creator.

His work 'For God and St George' featured in a charity concert to support Belgians at the outbreak of the Great War.
