= The Arrow (newspaper) =

Newspaper in Sydney, NSW, 1891 - 1896

The Arrow was a weekly English-language broadsheet newspaper published in Sydney, Australia between 1896 and 1933. The paper had previously been published under two earlier titles, The Dead Bird and Bird O’Freedom and also appeared as the Saturday Referee and the Arrow. It was later absorbed by The Referee.

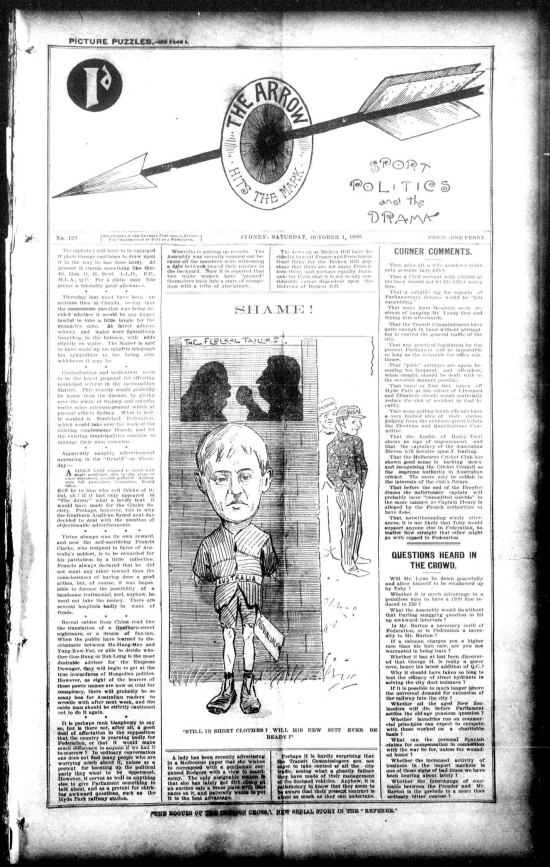
The Arrow, 1 October 1898

== History ==
The Dead Bird was first published on 16 May 1889 by Herbert Allan Risdale, and in 1891 the name was changed to Bird O'Freedom.

On 7 March 1896 the name changed to The Arrow. It was published by Harry Markham Evans. The paper was a sporting weekly. In 1916 The Arrow came into the ownership of Hugh D. McIntosh in 1916, when he acquired the Sunday Times. In 1933 the paper was absorbed by The Referee, another sporting weekly, which began publication in 1886 and ceased publication on 31 August 1939.

== Digitisation ==
Many issues of the paper have been digitised as part of the Australian Newspapers Digitisation Program, a project of the National Library of Australia in cooperation with the State Library of New South Wales.

== See also ==
- List of newspapers in Australia
- List of newspapers in New South Wales
