= C. J. De Garis =

Australian businessman (1884–1926)

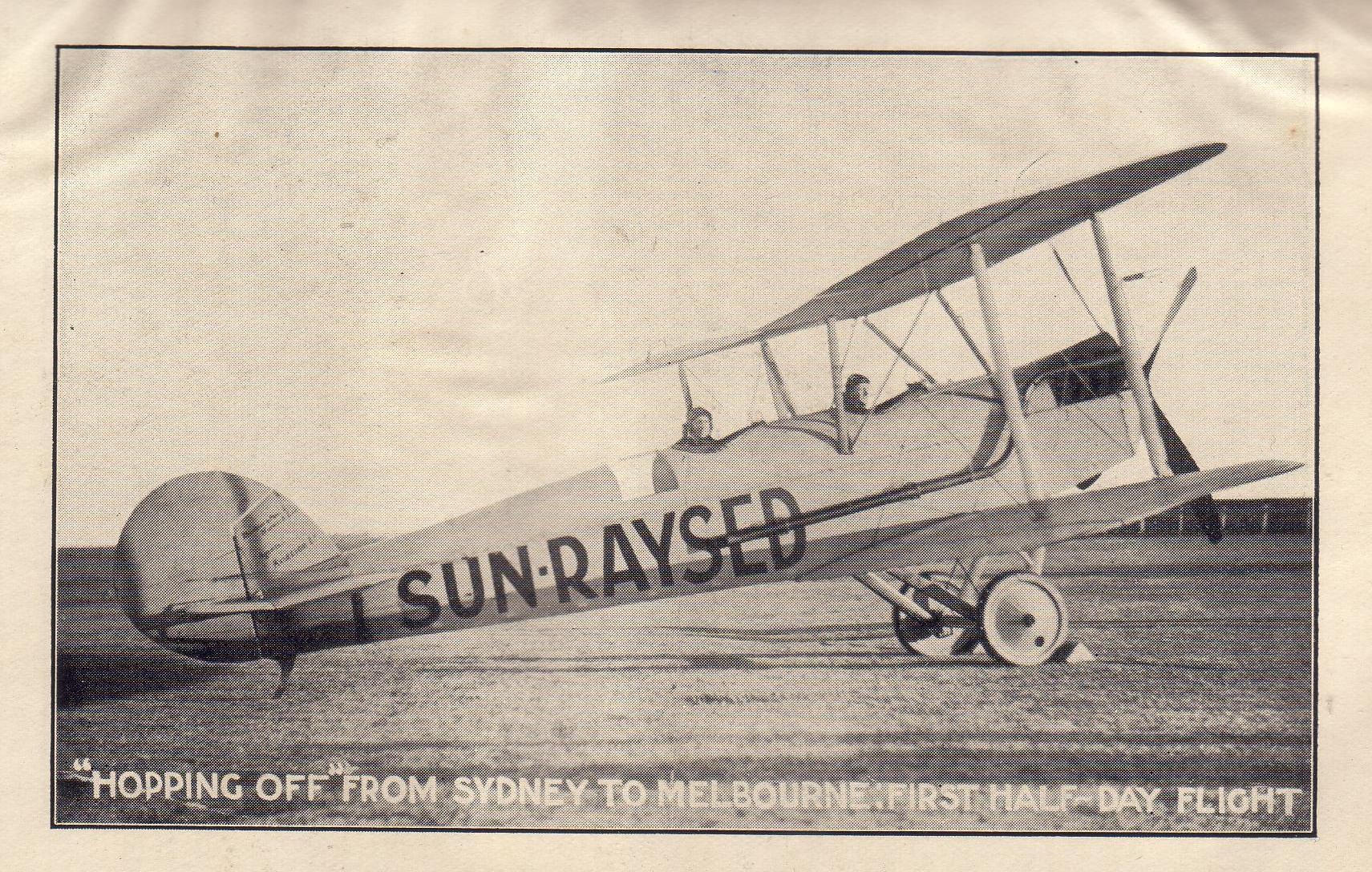
De Garis on one of his promotion tours for "Sun-Raysed" fruits

Clement John "Jack" De Garis (22 November 1884 – 17 August 1926) was an Australian entrepreneur and aviator. He worked in the dried fruits industry in the Sunraysia area around Mildura Victoria, in the early 20th century, and was noted for his vibrant personality and colourful marketing style.

== Early years ==
Clement John De Garis was the son of Elisha or Elizee De Garis, a noted irrigationist, and the younger brother of Mary De Garis, a Bachelor of Medicine and Bachelor of Surgery who served as a Chief Medical Officer of a field hospital in Serbia during World War I. He went to Mildura State School where he was described as an above-average student. However, he left at the age of nine to work in his father's businesses in Mildura. He returned to school for his secondary education at his father's urging, boarding at Wesley College, Melbourne from 1899 to 1901, where he rose to become dux of his class.

Described as being short in stature, he capitalised on an affectionate smile and a magnetic personality. He excelled in school cricket and football, in which, despite his size, being only 150 cm (4 ft 11 in) tall and weighing only 43 kg (95 lb), he confounded opposition players and coaches.

== Career ==
De Garis' father had established a successful market garden business in Mildura from about 1885. In 1908 the day-to-day business was left to C. J., and Elisha moved to Melbourne establish a selling agency for the business. C. J. was just 17, but had a strong self-belief and effervescent charm. Theatrical entrepreneur Claude Kingston described him as the "prince of ballyhoo".

De Garis expanded the business rapidly, and in 1910 borrowed heavily to establish a packing shed, Sarnia Packing Pty Ltd, which later became part of the Sunbeam Foods Group. In 1913 he borrowed again to purchase the 10,009-acre (4,050 ha) Pyap Village Estate at Pyap, near Loxton in South Australia. The estate was moderately successful as a farm produce settlement, but in 1921 it was broken up and sold to fund De Garis's Kendenup venture. £23,000 was raised from the sale.

In 1919, a shortage of shipping space hit the dried fruits industry which was, at that time, highly dependent on British markets. Realising his ability to market, the Australian Dried Fruits Association funded De Garis to undertake an Australia-wide publicity campaign to increase domestic consumption. He also expanded into book publishing, as well as, with Harry J. Stephens, producing the Sunraysia Daily newspaper in Mildura, employing nearly 100 staff.

Also in 1919, De Garis exposed a con-man, with a "rank but not-too-well-sustained American accent", named George Henry Cochrane. Cochrane wrote for The Bulletin as "Grant Hervey", and had recently been released from prison for forgery and uttering. Cochrane emerged in Mildura and presented himself to two thousand Mildura citizens, selling the idea that western Victoria, including Mildura, should secede from Victoria. He started receiving £5 subscriptions before De Garis revealed his true identity and criminal record.

As part of his dried-fruits marketing De Garis travelled to Western Australia where, in 1920, he purchased the 47,000-acre (19,000 ha) property of the Hassell family at Kendenup, for the purpose of building a new settlement to grow apples, potatoes and farm produce. He subdivided the land into blocks ranging from 10 acres (4 ha) to 60 acres (24 ha), and set up the De Garis Kendenup (W.A.) Development Company, and the Kendenup Fruit Packing Company, which ran a dehydrating factory to process vegetables and fruit grown by the 350 settlers who he had encouraged into the area. In December 1921, De Garis and his family were living there, and the enterprise was under way, with a townsite being established. However the settlement eventually floundered. It had insufficient capital and the lot sizes were uneconomically small. De Garis travelled to the United States to raise urgently needed capital, which was promised but was never forthcoming. After two years, only 30 settlers remained.

The collapse of the settlement was the subject of a 1923 Western Australian Royal Commission into Kendenup land schemes, in which fraud had been alleged. De Garis was eventually cleared of any charges.

== Artistic endeavours ==
De Garis wrote a four-act military drama Ambition Run Mad, which was published both as a booklet and in serial form, in the Murray Pioneer newspaper in 1915.

As part of his publicity campaign for the Australian Dried Fruits Association, De Garis engaged the services of popular composer Reginald Stoneham to put tunes to promotional lyrics he had written. The resulting Sun-Raysed Waltz was published as sheet music. He and Stoneham then worked on an ambitious "mystery" musical comedy F.F.F., which had a short but successful season for Hugh D. McIntosh's Tivoli theatres in Adelaide, Perth and Melbourne in late 1920.

De Garis also wrote songs, he co wrote The Murray Moon , recorded by Slim Dusty and Anne Kirkpatrick

== Aviation ==
De Garis described himself as an aviator, and he owned several aeroplanes, but the reality was that he employed pilots to ferry him between Australian cities for business purposes as well as to advocate for flying as a new means of travel. Nevertheless, in an era of pioneer aviation, his intense involvement was considered dangerous, and at one stage he was asked by investors to refrain from use of aeroplanes for transport.

With his pilots, De Garis set several interstate flying records. His first plane, which he acquired in June 1920, was a 90 hp (67 kW) Boulton Paul P.9, and was flown by pilot Lieutenant A.L. Lang (AFC). Later in 1920, after the P.9 had crashed, De Garis purchased a Sopwith Gnu for £1,800. In July 1920 he employed Lieutenant Francis Stewart Briggs as his permanent pilot. He also purchased an Airco DH.4.

De Garis's first major interstate flight was in the DH.4 from Melbourne to Perth, the first time Australia had been crossed by air from east to west, a distance of 2,169 miles (3,491 km). The plane landed at Belmont Park Racecourse on 2 December 1920, after 19 hours 10 minutes. One stretch of 1,105 miles (1,778 km) was done in 8¾ hours. De Garis, Briggs and their mechanic, Sergeant Stoward, were given a mayoral reception on their arrival in Perth. On 14 December they flew from Perth to Sydney, a distance of 2,462 miles (3,962 km) in a time of 21½ hours.

Another notable flight was from Mildura to Sydney (5½ hours) and on to Brisbane (4 hours 50 minutes), in January 1921. Then, on 16 January, they set off on a one-day flight from Brisbane to Melbourne, leaving at 6:15 am and reaching their destination at 7:20 pm, a flying time of 10½ hours. Stopovers were made in Grafton, Sydney and Cootamundra.

== Decline ==
The Kendenup collapse coincided with a number of other financial failures within his empire. With mounting debts, he disappeared, leaving his car at Mentone and having apparently drowned in Port Phillip on 5 January 1925. He had written almost seventy farewell letters. His letter to Stoneham read:

You will have the papers by now, and will have seen what has become of me. The strain has been too long and too strong, and I have cracked up under it. I hope, however, for the sake of dear Vy that my new song "Moonoloo", turns out a winner, for she will need to get every penny she can. Think as pleasantly as you can of me, who came nearer to being a big success than people think; and who consequently became the greatest failure. Regards and regrets.

— De Garis.

Suspicions that De Garis was still alive soon surfaced and he became the subject of an eight-day nationwide search. He was apprehended the following week after arriving in Auckland, New Zealand, on the SS Maheno.

On 17 August 1926, with debts of £420,000, De Garis committed suicide by gassing himself at his Mornington home. Shortly before he died, an autobiographical novel Victories of Failure: A Business Romance (1925) was published in which he described his life and business career in great detail in the guise of "K.J. Rogers".

De Garis married Rene (née Corbould) in September 1907; they had three daughters, and divorced in May 1923. The following month he married his former private secretary Violet (née Austin), with whom he had one daughter. De Garis is buried at Brighton Cemetery in Melbourne.
