= F.F.F. (musical) =

1920 Australian musical comedy

F.F.F.: An Australian Mystery Musical Comedy is a musical written by C. J. De Garis, with music by Reginald A. A. Stoneham. It played in Australia with production by Robert Greig in 1920 and is generally considered the first Australian musical comedy, as distinct from operetta or light opera.

== Synopsis ==
The convoluted plot involved a budding English playwright Fitzwilliam Ferguson who is sent to Australia by a rich uncle, and who falls in love with his typist, Flo Hastings. His uncle recalls him to England and promises to make him his heir, if he can become a 'proper' English gentleman. All the complications are resolved in the end.

The "mystery" centred on the meaning of the enigmatic title, for which solutions were solicited and a prize offered.

== Productions ==
The original production, produced by the Tivoli Circuit, starred Maggie Moore, Rex London, Minnie Love, Billy Rego, Hugh Steyne, Marie Le Varre and Charles H. Workman. The musical opened 28 August 1920 at the Prince of Wales Theatre in Adelaide, followed by a week in Perth and a fortnight in Melbourne. Several of its songs were recorded and were popular in Australia for a few years.

== Critical reception ==
Reviewers found this production one of the best shows seen in Adelaide. Some reviewers considered it equal to any import. The scenery and Australian character roused enthusiasm. Overall, the show had a successful run, but it was not revived.

== Musical numbers ==
The musical incorporated sixteen songs, orchestrated for eleven musicians.

- "The Murray moon"
- "Soli mio dazzle"
- "Fitz-Fitz-Fitz-William"
- "The magic call Coo-ee!!"
- "The wattle waltz"
- "A garden of girls"
- "O-o-meo"
- "My name's Smith"
- "Proposing song"
- "The riddle of F.F.F."
- "The Aussie glide"
- "Moo-Noo-Loo"
- "The Courtship"
- "Wait For Me"
- "We Feel Fine"
