= Bert Rache =

Australian composer and conductor

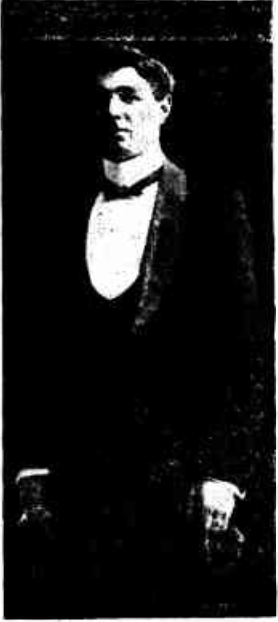
- Bert Rache

Background information
- Born: Lismore, New South Wales, Australia
- Died: 30 August 1928
- Occupations: Composer, conductor, producer
- Years active: 1890–1920

'The Rivals Waltz' 1910 by Bert Rache (-1928)

My Waratah 1907 by Bert Rache (1907
MIDI rendition)

Bert Rache (1876–1928) born Joseph Bernard Rash, was an Australian composer, music director, conductor, pianist, company leader.

Bert Rache grew up in Lismore, New South Wales, and began his career as a musician in the late 1890s. After touring as George Rignold's orchestra leader, he was employed as a pianist with Harry Rickards in 1903, continuing this association for many years. His early career also included work with Perth's Palace Gardens (1904–06) and King's Theatre (circa 1909). Rache was in high demand as a music director, composer, and arranger throughout the 1910s and 1920s, and he toured with his own troupes at various times, including the Imperial Orchestra and Th' Drolls.

== Works ==
- 1906 Imperial Intermezzo
- 1906 Dance of the Rosebuds
- 1907 Tivoli Mazurka
- 1908 We of the Southern Cross March
- 1910 Besses o' the barn march
- 1911 Take me back to Bendigo
- 1910 The Rivals Waltz
- 1912 suite of works for pantomime 'Aladin' including Forty Thieves two step and Sinbad waltz
- 1912 Silvery Moon Schottische
- 19212 Surfer's Two Step (arrangement)
- 1912 Confetti waltz / by Bert Rache
- 1915 Suite of works for musical play entitled 'Come Over Here'
- 1916 Suite of works for pantomime 'Puss in Boots'
- 1907 Daughter of Australia for a stage production of The Squatter's Daughter (play), later a successful silent global film.
- 1921 Golden Days
- Buckle Up - One Step novelty
- I've made up my mind to leave my dear old home.
- To live in the light od your eyes
- I never knew I loved you, till you said goodbye
- Chants and Choruses [for the] Royal Antediluvian Order of Buffaloes [printed by] Syd. Day, Ltd.

== Americana Faux ==
Bert Rache published a few fake American songs, presumably to capture audience enthusiasm for imported exotica, or accompaniment of American stage productions.

- 1913 On the Mississippi
- 1910 I'm going back to Dixie - two step
- 1909 Way down on the old Swanee (arrangement)

== Recordings ==
A recording of a topical patriotic song 'Soldier Sentry of the Deep' is in circulation, celebrating the triumphant return of HMS New Zealand from the great war.

A gramophone recording exists of patriotic march 'They Were There (There, There)' with lyrics by War Hero Harley Cohen vocals by Foster Richardson, thirteenth item
