= The Referee (newspaper) =

Australian newspaper

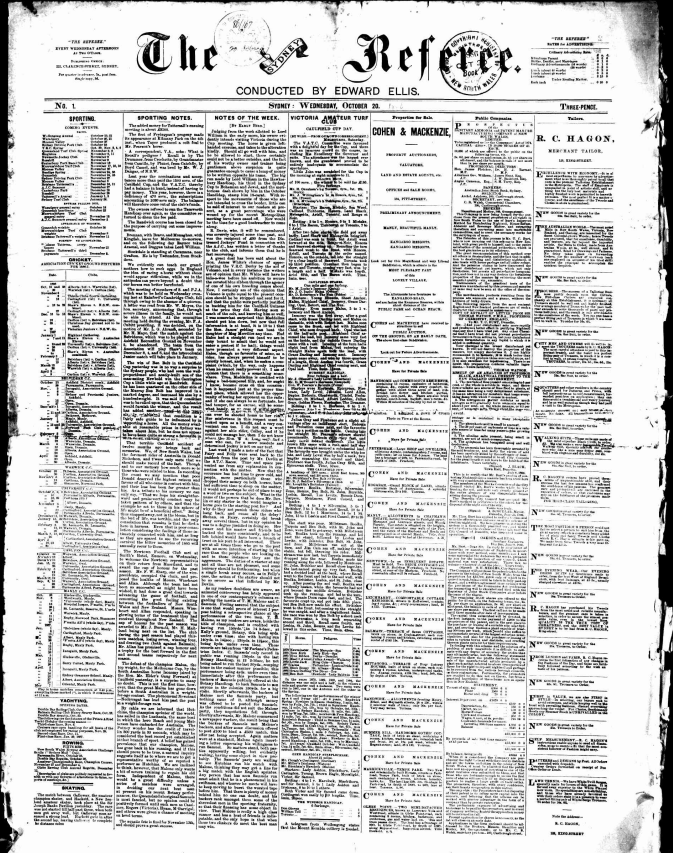
Referee 20 October 1886

The Referee was a newspaper published in Sydney, Australia from 1886 to 1939.

== History ==
The Referee was first published on 20 October 1886 as The Sydney Referee by Edward Lewis. In 1933 it absorbed The Arrow. It ceased on 31 August 1939.

In 1887 Nat Gould started work as "Verax", horse-racing editor for the paper, which published in serial form his first novel, With the Tide, followed by his next five. He returned to England in 1895.

== Digitisation ==
This paper has been digitised as part of the Australian Newspapers Digitisation Program project of the National Library of Australia.

== See also ==
- List of newspapers in Australia
- List of newspapers in New South Wales
