= Sopwith Gnu =

British 1919 biplane touring aircraft

Gnu
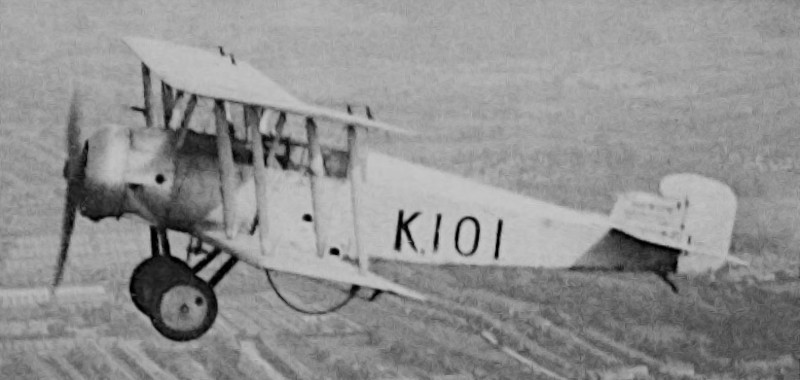

General information
- Type: Touring biplane
- Manufacturer: Sopwith Aviation & Engineering Company
- Number built: 13

History
- Introduction date: 1919

The Sopwith Gnu was a 1910s British touring biplane, designed and built by the Sopwith Aviation & Engineering Company of Kingston-upon-Thames. It was one of the first cabin aircraft designed for civil use.

== Design and development ==
Designed for the postwar civil market, the Gnu was a conventional equal-span biplane. It had an open cockpit for a pilot with seating for two passengers under a hinged and glazed roof. Most of the aircraft were powered by a 110hp Le Rhône rotary engine. The enclosed passenger cabin was cramped and unpopular, and most production aircraft had an open rear cockpit. One prototype and twelve production aircraft were built. A postwar slump ended production, and the company had problems selling the aircraft, although two aircraft were sold in Australia.

== Operational history ==
The United Kingdom-based aircraft were mainly used to provide joyrides in the early 1920s. Two aircraft that were used for exhibition and stunt flying in the late 1920s crashed. Most of the production aircraft were not sold, and were dismantled, including four aircraft that remained unsold when the Sopwith Aviation Company folded in 1920. Two Australian aircraft were used by Australian Aerial Services on the Adelaide to Sydney mail route.

== Operators ==
Australia

- Australian Aerial Services

== Specifications (Gnu) ==
General characteristics

- Crew: one (pilot)
- Capacity: two
- Length: 25 ft 10 in (7.88 m)
- Wingspan: 38 ft 1 in (11.61 m)
- Height: 9 ft 10 in (3.00 m)
- Gross weight: 3,350 lb (1,520 kg)
- Powerplant: 1 × Le Rhône rotary engine , 110 hp (82 kW)

Performance

- Maximum speed: 93 mph (150 km/h, 81 kn)
- Range: 300 mi (483 km, 260 nmi)
- Rate of climb: 645 ft/min (3.3 m/s)
