= Thomas P. Banks =

Thomas Philip Banks (28 May 1848 – 13 May 1888) was organist of St Mary's Cathedral, Sydney from 1879 to 1888.

Banks was born in London and had some musical training from his mother, and later under Anthony Le Jeune, organist of the Moorfields Catholic chapel. He left for Australia while still a boy, with his parents and siblings, and received further organ instruction from Charles S. Packer, Charles Horsley, and William Cordner, with whom John A. Delany was a fellow-pupil.

He was employed in Sydney in the Crown Lands Department from around 1866 to late 1886.

His first appointment as organist in Australia was to the Church of the Sacred Heart, Darlinghurst, New South Wales.

He was appointed to St Patrick's Church in 1874, succeeding E. A. Roper, who died on 28 March.

In 1877 he was appointed to St Mary's Cathedral as assistant.

He was considered a faithful interpreter of the masses of Mozart, Haydn, Weber, and Gounod. He quit his daytime job around late 1886 to concentrate on his position as cathedral organist.

He died from pneumonia at St Vincent's Hospital, Sydney and his remains were buried at Waverley Cemetery. He was accorded a particularly fine and impressive memorial.
