= John Albert Delany =

Australian organist and composer

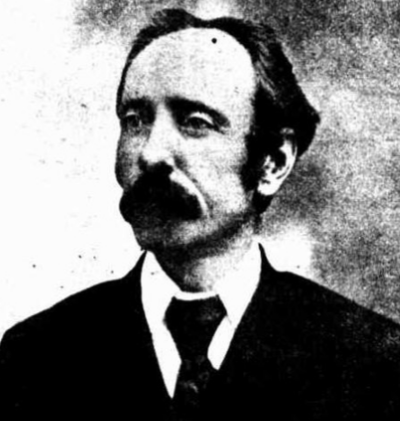
- John Albert Delany
- Born: 6 July 1852; England
- Died: 11 May 1907 (aged 54); Paddington, Sydney, New South Wales
- Resting place: Waverley Cemetery
- Other name: John A. Delany
- Occupations: Organist; composer; choirmaster; conductor
- Notable work: Mass in A flat (1892); A Song of the Commonwealth
- Spouse: Jane Anne Sharpe (m. 1872; died 1887)
- Children: 2

John Albert Delany (6 July 1852 – 11 May 1907), usually referred to as John A. Delany, was an organist and composer in Sydney, Australia, a champion of choral music. He has been called "Australia's greatest musician" and "The Australian Gounod".

== History ==
Born in England in 1852, the only son of J. D. Delany, and came to New South Wales around 1855 with his parents. His first music lessons were with Ellis Taylor, organist of St John's Church of England, Newcastle, then studied with the Benedictine monks at Lyndhurst College, Sydney, and had music lessons from William Cordner, organist of St Mary's pro-Cathedral. After Cordner's death, in 1870, he was taken on as a student by Charles S. Packer.

His first musical appointment was as violinist in the orchestra of the Victoria Theatre. He had become sought after by theatre managers for his expertise in scoring music for orchestra.

In 1872 "Cordner's boy" was appointed choirmaster at St Mary's Cathedral, and followed John Hill as choirmaster and organist in 1873. There could have been no pipe organ in the brick building that served as the cathedral since the fire of 1868, but a harmonium would have been adequate for the purpose.

His students include Harry Barton Dawkins.

He joined the Lyster Opera Company as conductor and chorus master in 1877, and was musical director for Nellie Melba's Sydney debut. He later filled similar functions with Martin Simonsen's company.

He returned to St Mary's briefly, for the triduum (three-day festival) that accompanied the opening of the new Cathedral by Archbishop Vaughan 8–10 September 1882, when choirs from all of Sydney's Catholic churches took part. Delany composed the march that was performed at the opening and closing ceremonies. Thomas P. Banks was the organist.

He was conductor of the Sydney Liedertafel 1885–1897.

From 1886 to 1897 he served at St Mary's pro-Cathedral as musical director, and from 1895 to 1897 as organist. His resignation from both posts has been attributed to the cathedral's refusing to allow women as choir members.

Delany served in 1897 as first director of the Sydney Institute of Music as chairman of the board of examiners.

=== Notable performances ===
- He was one of three conductors, with Alfred Hill and Hugo Alpen, of the mass choirs at the Federation celebration on New Year's Day 1901 at Centennial Park, Sydney.
- He conducted the Australian premiere of Elgar's Dream of Gerontius at the Sydney Town Hall on 21 December 1903.

=== Compositions ===
- Delany wrote spiritual works in unaccompanied plainsong.
- He is best known for an operatic Mass in A Flat, first performed December 1892. It was recorded in the 1950s and revived in 1993.
- Triduum march (1882)
- Cantata Captain Cook, to words by P. E. Quinn MLA, brother of Roderic Quinn
- A Song of the Commonwealth, first performed at the investiture of Governor-General Hopetoun in 1901.

== Family ==
Delany married Jane Anne Sharpe at St Mary's pro-Cathedral on 11 May 1872. The couple had two daughters; his wife Jane died in 1887. Delany died in Paddington, Sydney, in 1907 and his remains were buried in the Waverley Cemetery.
