= William J. Cordner =

Irish-born organist and choirmaster

William John Cordner (4 December 1826 – 15 July 1870) was an Irish-born organist and choirmaster in Sydney, Australia.

== History ==
Cordner was born in Dungannon, County Tyrone, Ireland, a son of Samuel Waring Cordner and his wife Margaret, née Weir. His father was the organist of the local Anglican church, and Cordner was a competent player by age seven, and sang in the choir. Like David Lee, the Melbourne City Organist, he studied under Robert Turle, younger brother of James Turle and organist of Armagh Cathedral from 1823 to 1872.

He "ran away to sea" and spent some years in India, then returned to Ireland, teaching music in Armagh. In 1854 he migrated to Sydney, where he was appointed organist to St Patrick's Church, where Dean Sumner was pastor, and was responsible for a marked improvement in that church's musical offerings.

In 1857 he was appointed organist and choirmaster to St Mary's Cathedral, again effecting considerable improvements, notably re-introducing female choristers and on occasion supplementing the organ with an orchestra.

He helped organise the music festival that attended opening of the Great Hall of Sydney University in July 1859.

He was a guest organist at the opening of the new organ for St Andrew's Cathedral in August 1867.

He conducted the choir for the new St Mary's Cathedral foundation stone laying ceremony in December 1868, Mrs Cordner being the leading soloist.

In November 1869 he organised a first for Australia — a production of Rossini's Petite messe solennelle at the Victoria Theatre, Sydney. It was applauded by the critics, but the paying public stayed at home that night.

Cordner was also a successful teacher: his pupils include John A. Delany and Thomas P. Banks, both of whom would later preside at the cathedral organ. He died at Woolloomooloo and his remains were buried at the Church of England section of Rookwood Cemetery.

He is credited with one composition, Thanksgiving, a hymn "for the preservation of H.R.H. the Duke of Edinburgh from the late attempt upon his life" to words by Derwent Coleridge, published and first performed in March 1868, now lost.

== Family ==
Cordner married Ellen Munton (1842–1932) on 18 May 1858. She has been described as stately, with a beautiful contralto voice, especially in traditional Irish songs, and sang in every choir led by Cordner. After his death she married again, to John Balfour Clement Miles on 25 February 1871. As Mrs Cordner-Miles she was living in Strathfield in 1921. Bea Miles was a granddaughter.
