= Fitzpatrick (surname) =

Fitzpatrick (/fɪtsˈpætrɪk/) is an Irish surname that most commonly arose as an anglicised version of the Irish patronymic surname Mac Giolla Phádraig (Irish: [mˠək ˈɟɪl̪ˠə ˈfˠaːd̪ˠɾˠəɟ]) "Son of the servant of (St.) Patrick".

In some cases, it may also have independently arisen by a similar anglicisation of a likely-distinct Irish patronymic, Ó Maol Phádraig, "Descendent of the Follower of (St.) Patrick", or in other cases as a genuine Anglo-Irish patronymic incorporating the Norman French fitz ('son of') and the male name Patrick.

Giolla Phádraig (meaning "the servant of [Saint] Patrick", also one of origins of the surname Gilpatrick) was the personal name of Gilla Patráic mac Donnchada, a tenth-century king of Ossory. His sons were subsequently styled Mac Giolla Phádraig (meaning, son of Giolla Phádraig),

In the 16th century, as part of the process of King Henry VIII's surrender and regrant scheme to colonise the Irish nobility, Brian Og Mac Giolla Phadraig / Brian McGilpatrick had to take the surname Fitz-Patrick or Fitzpatrick as part of his submission to the English Crown.

The Fitzpatrick surname may have also been adopted later amongst other unrelated Irish families, such as the Maguires of Fermanagh. Like the related Kilpatrick and Mulpatrick, the surname was sometimes shortened to Patrick.

The 1901 census of Ireland indicated the top five counties for the surname Fitzpatrick, by birth, were County Cavan, followed by counties Laois, Dublin, Down and Cork.

== Notable Fitzpatricks ==
- AJ Fitzpatrick (born 2004), American wheelchair basketball player
- Albert Fitzpatrick (born 1928), American journalist, editor, and media executive
- Alfred Fitzpatrick (1862–1936), Canadian founder of Frontier College
- Amy Fitzpatrick (born 1992), Irish girl who disappeared in 2008 in Málaga, Spain
- Anna Fitzpatrick (born 1989), British tennis player
- Art Fitzpatrick (1919–2015), American art director
- Austin Choi-Fitzpatrick (born 1977), American political sociologist
- Becca Fitzpatrick (born 1979), American author
- Benjamin Fitzpatrick (1802–1869), American politician
- Billy Fitzpatrick (born 1954), Irish hurler
- Blake Fitzpatrick (born 1955), Canadian photographer
- Brad Fitzpatrick (born 1980), American programmer
- Brian Fitzpatrick (disambiguation), several people
- Catherine A. Fitzpatrick, American author and translator
- Cathryn Fitzpatrick (born 1964), Australian cricketer
- Charles Fitzpatrick (1853–1942), Canadian lawyer and politician
- Colette Fitzpatrick (born 1974), Irish news anchor
- Colleen Fitzpatrick (disambiguation), several people
- Columbus Fitzpatrick (1810–1877), Irish-Australian builder, political activist and amateur historian
- Damien Fitzpatrick (born 1989), Australian rugby player
- Daniel R. Fitzpatrick (1891–1969), American editorial cartoonist
- Daphne Fitzpatrick (born 1964), American artist
- Dara Fitzpatrick (1972/3–2017), Irish helicopter pilot
- David Fitzpatrick (disambiguation), several people
- Dawn Fitzpatrick, American investment and financial officer
- Deanne Fitzpatrick, Canadian textile artist
- De Burgh Fitzpatrick Persse (1840–1921), Australian politician
- Declan Fitzpatrick (born 1983), Irish rugby union player
- Dennis Fitzpatrick (1764–1806), Irish jockey
- Dennis Fitzpatrick (civil servant) (1837–1920), Dublin-born Lieutenant-Governor of Punjab
- Denny Fitzpatrick, American basketball player
- Dermot Fitzpatrick (1940–2022), Irish politician
- Desmond Fitzpatrick (1912–2002), British Army officer
- Dez Fitzpatrick (born 1997), American football player
- D. J. Fitzpatrick (born 1982), American football player
- Duross Fitzpatrick (1934–2008), American judge
- Earl A. Fitzpatrick (1904–1984), American lawyer and politician
- Ed Fitzpatrick (1889–1965), American baseball player
- Edward Fitzpatrick (1884–1960), American college administrator and author
- Edward Fitzpatrick (died 1696), English army officer
- Enda Fitzpatrick (athlete), Irish athlete married to Róisín Smyth
- F. Emmett Fitzpatrick (1930–2014), American politician, attorney and professor
- Fiona Fitzpatrick, one half of the Swedish music duo Rebecca & Fiona
- Francis Fitzpatrick (disambiguation), several people
- Frank Fitzpatrick (born 1961), American entrepreneur and composer
- Frank Fitzpatrick (footballer) (1932–2003), Australian rules footballer
- Frank Fitzpatrick (mayor), 15th mayor of Ansonia, Connecticut, US
- Gabrielle Fitzpatrick (born 1967), Australian film and television actress
- Gary Fitzpatrick (born 1971), English footballer
- Gary Fitzpatrick (Australian footballer) (born 1955), Australian rules footballer
- George F. Fitzpatrick (1875–1920), Trinidadian barrister
- Glen Fitzpatrick (born 1981), Irish footballer and manager
- Graham Fitzpatrick, Scottish film director and screenwriter
- Grant Fitzpatrick (born 1976), Australian Paralympic swimmer
- Grant Fitzpatrick (musician), Australian musician
- Harold Fitzpatrick (1880–1942), English footballer
- Harry Morton Fitzpatrick (1886–1949), American mycologist
- Hugh Fitzpatrick (1872–1925), Australian rules footballer
- Huntley Fitzpatrick, American author
- Ian Fitzpatrick (born 1980), English footballer
- Ian Fitzpatrick (rugby union) (born 1995), Irish rugby union player
- Jack Fitzpatrick (businessman) (1923–2011), American businessman and politician
- Jack Fitzpatrick (cricketer) (1911–1999), Australian cricketer
- Jack Fitzpatrick (footballer) (born 1991), Australian rules footballer
- James Fitzpatrick (disambiguation), several people
- Jim Fitzpatrick (disambiguation), several people
- John Fitzpatrick (disambiguation), several people
- Jordan Fitzpatrick (born 1988), English footballer
- Joseph Fitzpatrick (disambiguation), several people
- Joyce Ann Fitzpatrick (born 1942), American politician
- J. R. Fitzpatrick (born 1988), Canadian NASCAR driver
- J. R. Fitzpatrick (American football), American football coach in 1907
- Justin Fitzpatrick (born 1973), Irish rugby union player and coach
- Karl Fitzpatrick (born 1980), English rugby player
- Kate Fitzpatrick (born 1947), Australian actress
- Kathleen Fitzpatrick (disambiguation), several people
- Katie Fitzpatrick, New Zealand professor
- Keene Fitzpatrick (1864–1944), American athletic coach and trainer
- Kellyanne Fitzpatrick (born 1967), birth name of Kellyanne Conway, American pollster, political consultant, and pundit
- Ken Fitzpatrick (born 1963), Canadian swimmer
- Kevin Fitzpatrick (disambiguation), several people
- Larry Fitzpatrick (born 1976), American football player
- Lee Fitzpatrick (born 1978), English footballer
- Leo Fitzpatrick (born 1977), American actor
- Leslie Fitzpatrick (born 1978), Trinidadian soccer player
- Lisa K. Fitzpatrick, American infectious disease physician, epidemiologist
- Lynton Fitzpatrick (born 1967), Australian rules footballer
- Madison Fitzpatrick (born 1996), Australian field hockey player
- Marc Fitzpatrick (born 1986), Scottish footballer
- Margaret Fitzpatrick (1911–1980), American actress and television producer known as Gail Patrick
- Maria Fitzpatrick (born 1949), Canadian politician
- Marie-Louise Fitzpatrick (born 1962), Irish children's author and illustrator
- Mark Fitzpatrick (born 1968), Canadian ice hockey goalie
- Mary Fitzpatrick (born 1969), Irish politician
- Mary Fitzpatrick (photographer) (born 1968), English photographer
- Matt Fitzpatrick (born 1994), English golfer
- Menna Fitzpatrick (born 1998), British alpine skier
- Michael Fitzpatrick (disambiguation), several people
- Minkah Fitzpatrick (born 1996), American football player
- Morgan Cassius Fitzpatrick (1868–1908), American politician
- Noel Fitzpatrick (born 1967), Irish veterinary surgeon
- Paul Fitzpatrick (born 1965), English footballer
- Paula Fitzpatrick (born 1985), Irish rugby union player
- Pete Fitzpatrick (died 1946), Canadian soccer player
- Peter Fitzpatrick (born 1962), Irish politician and sportsperson
- Peter Fitzpatrick (footballer) (born 1959), Australian rules footballer
- Richard Fitzpatrick (disambiguation), several people
- Richie Fitzpatrick (1880–1904), American gangster
- Ron Fitzpatrick (born 1940), Australian rules footballer
- Rory Fitzpatrick (born 1975), American ice hockey player
- Ross Fitzpatrick (born 1933), Canadian politician
- Ross Fitzpatrick (ice hockey) (born 1960), Canadian ice hockey player
- Ryan Fitzpatrick (born 1982), American football player
- Sandy Fitzpatrick (born 1944), American ice hockey player
- Savannah Fitzpatrick (born 1995), Australian field hockey player
- Seamus Davey-Fitzpatrick (born 1998), American actor
- Seán FitzPatrick (1948–2021), Irish banker
- Seán Fitzpatrick (born 1951), Irish hurler
- Sean Fitzpatrick (born 1963), New Zealand rugby union player
- Sheila Fitzpatrick (born 1941), Australian historian
- Shirley Fitzpatrick-Wong (born 1971), Canadian international lawn bowler
- Sonya Fitzpatrick, British broadcast personality and pet psychic
- Stephen Fitzpatrick (born 1977), British businessman, founder of OVO Energy
- Steve Fitzpatrick (born 1978), American politician
- Sulu Tone-Fitzpatrick (born 1992), New Zealand netball and rugby sevens player
- Theresa Fitzpatrick (born 1995), New Zealand rugby union player
- Thomas Fitzpatrick (disambiguation), several people
- Timmy Fitzpatrick, Irish hurler
- Toarlyn Fitzpatrick (born 1989), American basketball player
- Tony Fitzpatrick (disambiguation), several people
- Trevor Fitzpatrick (born 1980), Anglo-Irish footballer
- William Fitzpatrick (disambiguation), several people

=== Middle name ===
- Christopher Fitzpatrick Calloway (born 1968), American football player
- Paul Fitzpatrick Russell (born 1959), American Roman Catholic archbishop and diplomat
- Redmond Morris, 4th Baron Killanin (born 1947), Irish film producer

== See also ==
- Gilpatric
- Fitzpatrick (disambiguation)
- Brian Mac Giolla Phádraig (poet)
- Kingdom of Osraige
- Upper Ossory
- Mulpatrick
- Dál Birn
