= Richard Fitzpatrick =

Richard Fitzpatrick may refer to:

- Richard FitzPatrick (1748–1813), Anglo-Irish soldier, wit, poet and politician
- Richard Fitzpatrick (cinematographer) (born 1970), Australian cinematographer and marine biologist
- Richard FitzPatrick, 1st Baron Gowran (died 1727), British naval captain
- Spike Fitzpatrick (Richard S. Fitzpatrick, 1948–2006), American lawyer

== See also ==
- Richie Fitzpatrick (1880–1904), American gangster
- Fitzpatrick (surname)
- Fitzpatrick (disambiguation)
