= Jim Fitzpatrick =

Jim Fitzpatrick may refer to:

- Jim Fitzpatrick (actor) (born 1959), American actor
- Jim Fitzpatrick (artist), Irish artist
- Jim Fitzpatrick (athlete) (born 1959), American roller derby athlete, referee, artist, photographer and author
- Jim Fitzpatrick (footballer) (1886–1960), Australian rules footballer
- Jim Fitzpatrick (photographer) (fl. 1940s), Australian photographer for the Australian Information Service during WW2
- Jim Fitzpatrick (politician) (born 1952), British politician
- Jim Fitzpatrick (sound engineer), American sound engineer

== See also ==
- James Fitzpatrick (disambiguation)
- Fitzpatrick (surname)
- Fitzpatrick (disambiguation)
