= Catherine Fitzpatrick =

Catherine Fitzpatrick may refer to:

- Catherine A. Fitzpatrick, human rights activist and journalist
- Catherine Fitzpatrick (choir director), founder and conductor of St. Mary's Cathedral Choir, Sydney, Australia
- Catherine Fitzpatrick (Coppermine Herald), 1st Canadian Coppermine Herald

== See also ==
- Cathryn Fitzpatrick, Australian cricketer
- Kathleen Fitzpatrick (disambiguation)
