= Thomas Fitzpatrick =

Tom, Tommy, or Thomas Fitzpatrick may refer to:

- Thomas Fitzpatrick (Australian politician) (1835–1920), Irish-Australian politician
- Thomas Fitzpatrick (cartoonist) (1860–1912), Irish political cartoonist
- Thomas Fitzpatrick (London physician) (1832–1900), Irish surgeon
- Thomas Fitzpatrick (pilot) (1930–2009), American pilot
- Thomas Fitzpatrick (Queens) (1909–1972), American lawyer and politician
- Thomas Fitzpatrick (American sailor) (born 1837, date of death unknown), American Civil War sailor and Medal of Honor recipient
- Tom Fitzpatrick (Irish sailor) (born 1974), Irish Olympic sailor
- Thomas Fitzpatrick (trapper) (1799–1854), American mountain man
- Thomas B. Fitzpatrick (1919–2003), American dermatologist
- Thomas Benjamin Fitzpatrick (1896–1974), American governor of American Samoa
- Thomas Fitzpatrick (academic) (1861–1931), English university president
- Thomas Henry Fitzpatrick (died 1866), British missionary to the Punjab
- Thomas J. Fitzpatrick (Cavan politician) (1918–2006), Irish politician
- Thomas J. Fitzpatrick (Dublin politician) (born 1926), Irish politician
- Thomas M. Fitzpatrick (1890–1986), American sports coach
- Thomas Y. Fitzpatrick (1850–1906), American politician
- Tom Fitzpatrick (rugby league), Australian rugby league footballer active 1924–1930
- Tom Fitzpatrick (curler), American curler
- Tommy Fitzpatrick (born 1969), American artist

== See also ==
- Fitzpatrick (surname)
- Fitzpatrick (disambiguation)
