= Michael Fitzpatrick =

Michael, Mike, or Mick Fitzpatrick may refer to:

- Michael Fitzpatrick (Australian politician) (1816–1881)
- Michael Fitzpatrick (Kildare politician) (1942–2011), Irish Fianna Fáil TD
- Michael Fitzpatrick (musician) (born 1970), French American musician
- Michael Fitzpatrick (physician) (born 1950), British doctor and author
- Michael Fitzpatrick (cellist) (born 1964), American cellist and composer
- Michael J. Fitzpatrick (politician) (born 1957), American politician
- Michael J. Fitzpatrick (diplomat), American diplomat
- Michael R. Fitzpatrick, American judge
- Mick Fitzpatrick (1893–1968), Irish IRA leader and Clann na Poblachta politician
- Mick Fitzpatrick (rugby union), Irish rugby union player
- Mike Fitzpatrick (1963–2020), American lawyer and politician
- Mike Fitzpatrick (broadcaster) (born 1973), Australian radio broadcaster
- Mike Fitzpatrick (footballer) (born 1953), Australian rules footballer, administrator and businessman

Michael Fitzpatrick born (2007 28th of July) amateur boxer

== See also ==
- Fitzpatrick (surname)
- Fitzpatrick (disambiguation)
