= Patrick (surname) =

The surname Patrick has distinct Irish, Scottish, and English origins. In many cases it derives from the Anglo-Norman French, Middle English, and Older Scots personal name Patrick or as an Anglicised form of the Gaelic Mac Phádraig, "son of Patrick". All have a common origin in the Latin Patricius, itself meaning patrician and entering these languages via the Old Irish Patraicc. In others, the surname Patrick is a shortened form of the surnames Mulpatrick and Fitzpatrick. Many instances of Patrick as a surname appear in Ireland due to Scottish emigration. It can also be a form of the English surname Partridge or an Americanization of several Slavic names. People with the surname Patrick include:

- Aaron Patrick (born 1996), American football player
- Alan Patrick (footballer) (born 1991), Brazilian footballer
- Alf Patrick (1921–2021), English footballer
- Alice Patrick (born 1948), American muralist
- Allen Patrick (born 1984), American football running back
- Allen Russell Patrick (1910–1995), Canadian politician
- Andrew G. Patrick (1907–1955), American architect
- Arthur Patrick (1934–2013), Australian theologian and historian
- Ben Patrick (born 1984), American football tight end
- Bill Patrick (footballer) (1932–2003), Scottish footballer
- Bill Patrick (sports anchor) (born 1955), American sportscaster
- Bob Patrick (1917–1999), American baseball outfielder
- Brenda Jean Patrick (born 1955), American educational consultant
- Bronswell Patrick (born 1970), American baseball relief pitcher
- Butch Patrick (born 1953), American actor
- Chris Patrick (born 1979), American IT Specialist
- Claude Patrick (born 1980), Canadian mixed martial arts fighter
- Colin Patrick (1893–1942), British politician
- Craig Patrick (born 1946), American hockey player, coach and general manager
- Dan Patrick (sportscaster) (born 1956), American sportscaster
- Dan Patrick (Texas politician) (born 1950), American politician
- Danica Patrick (born 1982), American auto racing driver
- Darrin Patrick (1970–2020), American author and pastor
- David Patrick (writer) (1849–1914), Scottish writer and editor
- David Patrick (athlete) (born 1960), American hurdler
- Dennis Patrick (1918–2002), American character actor
- Dennis R. Patrick (born 1951), American Chairman of the Federal Communications Commission
- Deval Patrick (born 1956), American politician
- Diana Patrick (1878–1964), English novelist (pseudonym)
- Diane Patrick (born 1951), American First Lady of Massachusetts
- Diane Porter Patrick (born 1946), American politician
- Dorothy Patrick (1921–1987), American film actress
- Edwin D. Patrick (1894–1945), American general
- Emily Patrick (born 1959), English painter
- Eric Patrick, American filmmaker
- Frank Patrick (running back) (1915–1992), American football player
- Frank Patrick (quarterback) (born 1947), American football player
- Frank Patrick (ice hockey) (1885–1960), Canadian ice hockey player
- Fred Patrick (1965–1989), Dutch-Surinamese footballer
- Gail Patrick (1911–1980), American film actress
- Glenn Patrick (born 1950), American ice hockey player
- Hugh Talbot Patrick (1860–1939), American neurologist
- James MacIntosh Patrick (1907–1998), Scottish painter
- James Patrick (British Army officer), British military officer
- James Patrick (Canadian football) (born 1982), Canadian football cornerback
- James Patrick (ice hockey) (born 1963), Canadian ice hockey defenceman
- Jerome Patrick (1883–1923), American film actor
- Jody Patrick (born 1978), Canadian badminton player
- John Patrick (dramatist) (1905–1995), American playwright and screenwriter
- John Patrick (rugby union) (1898–1959), American rugby union player
- John R. Patrick (born 1945), American businessperson
- Johnny Patrick (born 1988), American football player
- Jordan Patrick (born 1992), English footballer
- Julian Patrick (1927–2009), American opera singer
- Kathy Patrick, American author and hairdresser
- Larne Patrick (born 1988), English rugby league footballer
- Lawrence Patrick (1920–2006), American auto safety researcher
- Lee Patrick (actress) (1901–1982), American actress
- Lee Patrick (saxophonist) (born 1938), American musician
- Leonard Patrick (1913–2006), American mobster
- Lester Patrick (1883–1960), Canadian ice hockey player and coach
- Lucas Patrick (born 1993), American football player
- Luther Patrick (1894–1957), American politician
- Lynn Patrick (1912–1980), Canadian ice hockey centre
- Marcus Patrick (born 1974), British actor
- Margaret Patrick (1913–1994), American musician known as "Ebony"
- Mark Patrick, American radio personality
- Marsena R. Patrick (1811–1888), American general and college president
- Mason Patrick (1863–1942), American general, first Chief of the Army Air Corps
- Mathew St. Patrick, American actor
- Matt Patrick (footballer) (1919–2005), Scottish footballer
- Matt Patrick (producer) (born 1974), American musician
- Matthew Patrick (politician) (1952–2025), American politician
- Matthew Patrick (Internet personality) (born 1986), American Internet personality
- Michelle Patrick (born 1949), American television soap opera writer
- Mike Patrick (1944–2025), American sportscaster
- Mike Patrick (American football) (1952–2008), American football punter
- Muzz Patrick (1916–1998), Canadian ice hockey player
- Myles Patrick (born 1954), American basketball player
- Natrez Patrick (born 1997), American football player
- Neil Kennedy-Cochran-Patrick (1926–1994), British Olympic sailor
- Nicholas Patrick (born 1964), American astronaut
- Nick Patrick (actor), British actor
- Nigel Patrick (1913–1981), English actor and stage director
- Pat Patrick (musician) (1929–1991), American jazz musician
- Paul Patrick (1950–2008), English teacher and LGBT rights activist
- Rhianna Patrick (born 1977), Australian radio personality
- Richard Patrick (born 1968), American rock musician
- Robert Patrick (born 1958), American actor
- Robert Patrick (playwright) (1937–2023), American playwright and writer
- Ronald Patrick (born 1991), American football player
- Roy Patrick (1935–1998), English footballer
- Ruth Patrick (1907–2013), American botanist
- Simon Patrick (1626–1707), English theologian and bishop
- Stephen Patrick (1932–2014), Canadian politician
- Steve Patrick (born 1961), Canadian ice hockey player
- Carmen Electra (born Tara Patrick in 1972), American actress
- Tera Patrick (born 1976), American pornographic actress
- Todd Patrick, music promoter
- Trevor Patrick (born 1947), New Zealand rugby league footballer
- U. E. Patrick, American auto racing team owner
- Van Patrick (1916–1974), American sportscaster
- Vincent Patrick, American novelist
- Wayne Patrick (1946–2010), American football running back
- William C. Patrick III (1926–2010), American microbiologist
- William Donald Patrick, Lord Patrick (1889–1967), Scottish judge
- William Kennedy-Cochran-Patrick (1896–1933), Scottish flying ace
- William Patrick (Canadian politician) (1810–1883), Canadian clergyman and politician
- William Patrick (author), American science editor
- William Patrick (minister) (1791–1872), Scottish clergyman
- William Penn Patrick (1930–1973), American businessman

== See also ==
- Patrick (given name)
- Patrick (disambiguation)
