= Jack Fitzpatrick =

Jack Fitzpatrick may refer to:

- Jack Fitzpatrick (footballer), Australian rules footballer
- Jack Fitzpatrick (businessman), American businessman and politician
- Jack Fitzpatrick (cricketer), Australian cricketer
- Jack Fitzpatrick (hurler), Irish hurler

== See also ==
- John Fitzpatrick (disambiguation)
