= Tony Fitzpatrick =

Tony Fitzpatrick may refer to:

- Tony Fitzpatrick (engineer) (1951–2003), British structural engineer
- Tony Fitzpatrick (footballer) (born 1956), Scottish football player and manager
- Tony Fitzpatrick (artist), (1958–2025), American artist

== See also ==
- Fitzpatrick (surname)
- Fitzpatrick (disambiguation)
