= 72 Dangerous Animals: Asia =

Australian nature documentary TV series

- Genre: Nature
- Starring: Bob Brisbane; Bryan Grieg Fry; Romulus Whitaker
- Country of origin: Australia
- Original language: English
- No. of seasons: 1
- No. of episodes: 12

Production
- Running time: 44-48 minutes
- Production company: Showrunner Productions

Original release
- Network: Netflix
- Release: 10 August 2018

72 Dangerous Animals: Asia is a 2018 Australian nature documentary exploring Asia's most deadly animals, starring Bob Brisbane, Bryan Grieg Fry and Romulus Whitaker.

== Premise ==
72 Dangerous Animals: Asia explores Asia's 72 most deadly animals competing for the ultimate title of most dangerous animal in Asia. It features interviews with wildlife experts and survivors of attacks.

== Cast ==
- Bob Brisbane
- Bryan Grieg Fry
- Romulus Whitaker
- Paul Rosolie
- Jamie Seymour
- Jonathon Young
- Warren Savary
- Boone Smith
- Gregory Erickson
- Richard Fitzpatrick
- Subarai Rajathurai
- Luiz A. Rocha
- Deepak Shimkhada
- Wong Siew Te

== Episodes ==
Below are the species shown in the program, in order of appearance and the position they obtained in the episode according to their potential threat to humans.

=== Wrong Place, Wrong Time ===
- Asian rhinoceros (3rd place)
- Indian leopard (1st place)
- Asian forest centipede (5th place)
- Orangutan (6th place)
- Toxic flower urchin (4th place)
- Saw-scaled viper (2nd place)

=== Jaws and Claws ===
- Golden eagle (4th place)
- Coconut crab (5th place)
- Pacific water sharks (2nd place)
- Camel spider (6th place)
- Sun bear (3rd place)
- Saltwater crocodile (1st place)

=== Chemical Warfare ===
- Slow loris (7th place)
- Black rat (2nd place)
- Fat-tailed scorpion (3rd place)
- Indian cobra (1st place)
- Poisonous toad (5th place)
- Rove beetle (6th place)
- Stingray (4th place)

=== Deadly: Fact or Folklore ===
- Langur monkey (4th place)
- Tiger (1st place )
- Joro spider (7th place)
- Tomistoma (3rd place)
- Asian needle ant (6th place)
- Otter (5th place)
- King cobra (2nd place )

=== Accidental Assassins ===
- Water buffalo (2nd place)
- Needlefish (6th place)
- Toxic crab (4th place)
- Mugger crocodile (3rd place)
- Box jellyfish (1st place)
- Reticulated python (5th place)

=== Pretty and Painful ===
- Cone snail (3rd place)
- Asiatic black bear (2nd place)
- Red panda (7th place)
- Blue Malayan coral snake (4th place)
- Eurasian lynx (5th place)
- Asian elephant (1st place)
- Red lionfish (6th place)

=== The Road Less Travelled ===
- Asiatic lion (3rd place)
- Komodo dragon (1st place)
- Electric ray (7th place)
- Golden jackal (4th place)
- Wolverine (6th place)
- Striped eel catfish (5th place)
- Brown bear (2nd place)

=== Urban Jungle ===
- Wild boar (5th place)
- Street dog (2nd place)
- Pufferfish (6th place)
- Indian red scorpion (4th place)
- Asian tiger mosquito (1st place)
- Common krait (3rd place)

=== Corner Me, I'll Fight ===
- Wolf (3rd place)
- Stonefish (2nd place)
- Malayan porcupine (7th place)
- Sloth bear (1st place)
- Gibbon (5th place)
- Snow leopard (6th place)
- Tarantula (4th place)

=== The Bold and the Brutal ===
- Honey badger (4th place)
- Russell's viper (1st place)
- Triggerfish (6th place)
- Macaque (rhesus macaque) (3rd place)
- Yak (5th place)
- Blue ringed octopus (2nd place)

=== Big! Banded! and Billed! ===
- Giant moray eel (4th place)
- Gaur (2nd place)
- Banded sea krait (3rd place)
- Asian forest scorpion (7th place)
- Gharial (6th place)
- Billfish (5th place)
- Asian giant hornet (1st place)

=== Fearsome Finalists ===
11- Komodo dragon
10- Asian giant hornet
9- Sloth bear
8- Asian tiger mosquito
7- Indian leopard
6- Tiger
5- Asian elephant
4- Indian cobra
3- Saltwater crocodile
2- Russell's viper
1- Box jellyfish

Run order:

1. - Leopard (4th)
2. - Komodo dragon 7th)
3. - Asian elephant (8th)
4. - Sloth bear (9th)
5. - Indian cobra (3rd)
6. - Asian giant hornet (10th)

*Countdown of non-finalist contenders*
7 - Tiger (5th)
8 - Saltwater crocodile (6th)
9 - Asian tiger mosquito (11th)
10 - Box jellyfish (1st)
11 - Russell's viper (2nd)

(Risky waters)

- Johnston's crocodile (3rd
- Dugite (2nd)
- Bull shark (1st)
- Cane toad (6th)
- Irukanji (4th)
- Saw fish (5th)

(Fast and furious)

- Platypus (6th)
- Funnel web spider (2nd)
- Cobbler (5th)
- Itchy grub (4th)
- Gwardar (1st)
- Water buffalo (3rd)

(Tiny terrors)

- Reef shark (3rd)
- Cassowary (5th)
- Mosquito (1st)
- Olive python (6th)
- Red lion fish (4th)
- Paralysis tick (2nd)

(Dead or alive)

- Cone snail (1st)
- Kangaroo (3rd)
- Tiger snake (2nd)
- Tasmanian tiger (6th)
- Sea anime (5th)
- Australian magpie (4th)

(The ancient killer)
