= Joseph Fitzpatrick =

Joseph or Joe Fitzpatrick may refer to:

- Joe FitzPatrick (born 1967), Scottish politician
- Joe Fitzpatrick (boxer) (born 1994), Irish boxer
- Joe Fitzpatrick (footballer) (born 1997), English footballer
- Joe Fitzpatrick (hurler) (born 1984), Irish hurler
- Joseph F. Fitzpatrick, American politician active in the 1920s
- Joseph F. Fitzpatrick Jr. (1932–2002), American carcinologist
- Joseph T. Fitzpatrick (1929–2006), American politician

== See also ==
- Fitzpatrick (surname)
- Fitzpatrick (disambiguation)
