= William Fitzpatrick =

William Fitzpatrick may refer to:

- William H. Fitzpatrick (1865–1932), American Democratic Party official
- William John Fitzpatrick (1830–1895), Irish historian
- William P. Fitzpatrick (born 1961), Irish-American politician
- William of Salisbury, 2nd Earl of Salisbury (died 1196), sometimes referred to as William fitz Patrick

== See also ==
- Fitzpatrick (surname)
- Fitzpatrick (disambiguation)
