= John Fitzpatrick =

John Fitzpatrick or FitzPatrick may refer to:

== Sportspeople ==
- John Fitzpatrick (athlete) (1907–1989), Canadian sprinter
- John Fitzpatrick (baseball) (1904–1990), American baseball coach
- John Fitzpatrick (cricketer) (1889–1952), Australian cricketer
- John Fitzpatrick (footballer, born 1946) (1946–2020), Scottish footballer
- John Fitzpatrick (Irish footballer), Irish soccer player during the 1890s
- John Fitzpatrick (racing driver) (born 1943), English racing driver
- J. R. Fitzpatrick (John Ryan Fitzpatrick, born 1988), Canadian racing driver
- John Fitzpatrick (hurler) (1905–1990), Irish hurler
- John FitzPatrick (American football) (born 2000), American football player

== Politics ==
- John Fitzpatrick (mayor) (1844–1919), Irish-American mayor of New Orleans
- John FitzPatrick (Australian federal politician) (1915–1997), Australian politician
- John Fitzpatrick (New South Wales politician) (1862–1932), Australian politician and journalist
- John Fitzpatrick (unionist) (1871–1946), Irish-American union leader
- John FitzPatrick, 1st Baron Castletown (1811–1883), Irish politician
- John FitzPatrick, 1st Earl of Upper Ossory (1719–1758), Irish peer and member of Parliament
- John FitzPatrick, 2nd Earl of Upper Ossory (1745–1818), Irish peer and member of Parliament
- John Lalor Fitzpatrick (1875–1956), Irish member of Parliament
- John Fitzpatrick (American politician), member of the Montana House of Representatives

== Others ==
- John Bernard Fitzpatrick (1812–1866), American Roman Catholic bishop
- John Clement Fitzpatrick (1876–1940), American archivist and historian
- John F. Fitzpatrick (1887–1960), American publisher
- John Joseph Fitzpatrick (1918–2006), American Roman Catholic bishop
- John Kelly Fitzpatrick (1888–1953), American painter
- John M. Fitzpatrick (1948–2014), Irish urologist
- John W. Fitzpatrick (born 1951), American ornithologist

== See also ==
- Fitzpatrick (surname)
- Fitzpatrick (disambiguation)
