= Colleen Fitzpatrick =

Colleen Fitzpatrick may refer to:

- Colleen Ann Fitzpatrick (born 1969), or Vitamin C, American pop singer
- Colleen Anne Fitzpatrick (1938–2017), Australian model, actress and filmmaker
- Colleen M. Fitzpatrick (born 1955), American forensic genealogist

== See also ==
- Fitzpatrick (surname)
- Fitzpatrick (disambiguation)
