= Francis Fitzpatrick =

Francis or Frank Fitzpatrick may refer to:

- Francis Fitzpatrick (VC) (1859–1933), Irish recipient of the Victoria Cross
- Francis G. Fitzpatrick (1903–1992), American politician
- Francis W. Fitzpatrick (1863–1931), American architect
- Francis Fitzpatrick (entrepreneur), British co-founder of Cosgrove Hall Fitzpatrick Entertainment
- Frank Fitzpatrick (born 1961), entrepreneur and composer
- Frank Fitzpatrick (footballer) (1932–2003), Australian rules footballer

== See also ==
- Fitzpatrick (surname)
- Fitzpatrick (disambiguation)
