= Kathleen Fitzpatrick =

Kathleen Fitzpatrick may refer to:

- Kathleen Fitzpatrick (Australian academic) (1905–1990), Australian professor and historian
- Kathleen Fitzpatrick (American academic) (born 1967), American digital humanities scholar
- Kathleen M. Fitzpatrick, American diplomat

== See also ==
- Catherine A. Fitzpatrick
- Fitzpatrick (surname)
- Fitzpatrick (disambiguation)
