= Pattrick =

Pattrick is a surname, a variant form of Patrick. Notable people with this surname include:

- Anne Pattrick (1881–1937), New Zealand Plunket nurse and nursing administrator
- Jenny Pattrick (born 1936), New Zealand novelist
- Maral Yazarloo-Pattrick (born 1981), Iranian motorcyclist and fashion designer
- Seme Pattrick (born 1981), Cameroonian footballer

== See also ==
- Patrick (surname)
