= James Fitzpatrick =

James Fitzpatrick or James FitzPatrick may refer to:

- James FitzPatrick (American football) (born 1964), American football player
- James Fitzpatrick (hurler) (born 1985), Irish hurler
- James Fitzpatrick (paediatrician) (born 1975), Australian paediatrician
- James Fitzpatrick (rugby union) (1892–1973), American rugby union player
- James A. FitzPatrick (1894–1980), American film producer, director, writer and narrator
- James A. FitzPatrick (New York politician) (1916–1988), American lawyer and politician
- James J. Fitzpatrick, namesake of Fitzpatrick Stadium
- James M. Fitzpatrick (1869–1949), U.S. Representative from New York
- James E. Fitzpatrick (1908–1967), mayor of Burlington, Vermont
- James Percy FitzPatrick (1862–1931), South African politician and author
- James Fitzpatrick (outlaw) (died 1778), also known as Sandy Flash, American highwayman

== See also ==
- Jim Fitzpatrick (disambiguation)
- James A. FitzPatrick Nuclear Power Plant, near Oswego, New York
- Fitzpatrick (surname)
- Fitzpatrick (disambiguation)
