= Brian Fitzpatrick =

Brian Fitzpatrick may refer to:

- Brian Fitzpatrick (American politician) (born 1973), U.S. representative from Pennsylvania
- Brian Fitzpatrick (Australian writer) (1905–1965), Australian author, historian, journalist
- Brian Fitzpatrick (baseball) (born 2000), American baseball player
- Brian Fitzpatrick (basketball) (born 1989), American-Irish basketball player
- Brian Fitzpatrick (Canadian politician) (born 1945), member of parliament from Saskatchewan
- Brian Fitzpatrick (rugby union) (1931–2006), New Zealand rugby union player
- Brian Fitzpatrick (Scottish politician) (born 1961), Scottish lawyer and politician
- Brian T. Fitzpatrick (born 1975), American academic and lawyer
- Brian Mac Giolla Phádraig (c. 1580 – 1653), Irish name anglicised to Brian Fitzpatrick

== See also ==
- Ryan Fitzpatrick (born 1982), American football player
- Fitzpatrick (surname)
- Fitzpatrick (disambiguation)
