= Gilpatric =

Gilpatric is a surname, shortened Anglicized form of Gaelic Mac Giolla Phádraig. Notable people with the surname include:

- Guy Gilpatric (1896–1950), American pilot, flight instructor, journalist, and writer
- Roswell Gilpatric (1906–1996), American lawyer and Deputy Secretary of Defense

== See also ==
- Fitzpatrick (surname)
