= St Mary's Cathedral Choir, Sydney =

Oldest musical institution in Australia

St Mary's Cathedral Choir in Sydney is the oldest musical institution in Australia. In 1818 a group of choristers was formed to sing Vespers before the Blessed Sacrament in the Dempsey Household, the centre of Roman Catholic worship in Sydney as a penal colony. When St Mary's Cathedral, Sydney, was constructed, the successors of these choristers formed the Permanent Cathedral Choir under the guidance of Catherine Fitzpatrick.

Now over 200 years old, the choir is formed of approximately 40 boy and girl choristers and 12 lay clerks, and sings Mass and Vespers daily (excluding Saturday). The choir has gone on many tours and concerts, sometimes singing with the Australian Brandenburg Orchestra (2003, 2005). They are preparing to go on another tour in 2026. The choir is currently directed by the Director of Music, Mr Daniel Justin, with the help of Simon Niemiński, the current Assistant Director.

== Choir tradition ==
In 1818, Catherine Fitzpatrick, a schoolteacher New South Wales, established a group of singers to provide music for masses and other Catholic liturgies. As was the custom in the 19th century, the nascent choir included both men and women singers. In 1821, St. Mary's Cathedral was established in Sydney, and Fitzpatrick became the first conductor of the Cathedral's choir.

The repertoire, both before and under John Albert Delaney (choirmaster largely from 1872 to 1907) and then continuously prior to 1955, favoured Gregorian chant, polyphony and the classical Masses and operatic-style sacred works popular in the 19th century. Under Benedictine episcopal leadership and then diocesan episcopal leadership the choir was variously mixed or single sex.

In 1955, the mixed choir of men and women was reformed under Fr Ron Harden into a choir of boys and men and incorporating a choir school. Since 1955, consistent to the Benedictine English tradition from which the cathedral's founders came, the choir has been a liturgical choir for male voices, boy trebles and adult men, thus finally confirming to the motu proprio of Pope Pius X aimed at restoring the tradition of Catholic liturgical and musical heritage. The musical heritage of Gregorian chant and polyphonic Masses, including composers typified by Palaestrina and Victoria, was given priority in the reformed choir. Fr Harden's successor as director was Fr John De Luca.

Under the direction of the successor of Fr John De Luca, David Russell (1976-2009), the choir undertook three international concert tours, two to Europe and one to the United States.

Under Thomas Wilson (Director of Music) the Cathedral Choir expanded its repertoire and involvement in the cathedral's life of prayer and worship. The choir currently sing at daily services of Vespers and Mass (excluding Fridays) and continue to sing at Solemn Mass each Sunday at 10:30 am. The gentlemen of the choir sing Vespers most Sundays at 5:00 pm. New choristers (who attend the Cathedral College as trebles in Year 5) learn not only about music, but also about the Catholic faith, history and culture.

The choir continues to perform works by composers such as Palestrina, Victoria as well as modern composers such as Macmillan, Bingham, Matthew Martin and David Briggs. In addition to the wide range of polyphonic repertoire the choir sings Gregorian Chant at all services. The Gentlemen of the Cathedral Choir have recently released a CD of Marian Vespers and the full choir will be releasing a CD that encompasses the full church year (currently in post-production).

In 2010 the Cathedral Choir were invited to sing at the opening of Domus Australia in Rome, which was presided over by Pope Emeritus Benedict XVI. While on tour in Rome the choir performed at St Peter's Basilica, St Paul's Outside the Wall, St Maria Maggiore, Domus Australia, Santa Maria in Trastevere and Santa Maria Dei Pellegrini.

2018 marked the two hundredth anniversary of the founding of the choir. In July 2018, the Cathedral Choir performed in Rome at St. Peter's Basilica, with Pope Francis in attendance. Earlier that year, the Choristers of the Cathedral Choir performed as part of the International Gregorian Festival of Watou.

== Choir crest ==
Choir crest

As part of the cathedral, the choir has its own coat of arms. This crest appears on the medals worn by head-boys, corner-boys (assistant head-boys) and others with a special role. The crest is divided into two equal parts, both with much symbolism. In colour it is blue (the colour for St Mary), crimson and white (the choir colours) as well as gold (colour for feasts of Christ).

The left panel bears the arms of the cathedral itself. The cross, symbol of Christian faith in the redemption, is mounted on the crescent moon, symbol of the Virgin Mary, the patroness of the cathedral. Christian tradition represents her as the Fair Moon, preceding the rise of Christ, the Sun of Justice.

The right panel displays a musical stave of Gregorian chant, imposed upon an archbishop's cross. The stave bears the first notes of the famous Gregorian hymn to the Virgin Mary, "Alma Redemptoris Mater" ("Hail, thou Mother of the Redeemer"). It is a reminder both of their musical vocation and of the cathedral's special consecration to the Virgin Mary. The archiepiscopal cross with its double cross-bar belongs exclusively to archbishops, and may be carried before them in procession. It is the sign that the cathedral is the personal seat of the archbishop, the centre of unity in the diocese.

== Directors of Music ==
- 1818–1843 - Catherine Fitzpatrick
- c.1842–1854 - Isaac Nathan (1792–1864)
- 1872–1907 - John Albert Delaney
- 1930–1933 - Dr Mario Petorelli
- 1933–1954 - William J. Caspers
- 1955–1970 - Fr Ron Harden
- 1970–1975 - Fr John De Luca
- 1975–2009 - David Russell
- 2009–2010 - Elizabeth Swain
- 2010–2023 - Thomas Wilson
- 2023–present - Daniel Justin

== Organists ==
- 1834–35 J. de C. Cavendish
- 1839 J. A. Reid
- c. 1840– ? Ross
- 1841–1842 Isaac Nathan
- 1842–1843 George W. Worgan
- c. 1848–c. 1854 Walton [Bishop Henry Davis is also known to have played regularly at this time]
- 1856–1870 William J. Cordner
- 1870–1871 or 72 John Hill
- 1872–1877 John A. Delany
- 1877–1878 "Professor" Hughes
- 1879–1888 Thomas P. Banks
- 1888–1895 Neville G. Barnett
- 1895–1907 John A. Delany
- 1907–1863 Harry Dawkins
- 1963 Neil Slarke
- 1964–1971 Errol Lea-Scarlett
- 1971–1974 John O'Donnell
- 1974 Mark Davies (?)
- 1974–1979 Errol Lea-Scarlett
- 1979–1987 Gavin Tipping
- 1988–2011 Peter Kneeshaw

== Assistant Directors of Music ==
- 2011-2015 Oliver Brett
- 2016-2016 Andrej Kouznetsov
- 2017 Michael Butterfield (Acting)
- 2018–present Simon Niemiński

== Organ scholars ==
- 2011 James Goldrick
- 2012 Michael Butterfield
- 2013 Joshua Ryan

== See also ==
- Music of Sydney
- St Mary's Cathedral College, Sydney
