= Fitzpatrick House =

Fitzpatrick House may refer to:

in the United States

(by state, city)

- Fitzpatrick House (Lockport, Illinois), listed on the National Register of Historic Places (NRHP)
- Fitzpatrick House (Mooresville, Tennessee), listed on the NRHP in Marshall County, Tennessee

It may also refer to:

- W. T. Fitzpatrick House, Mount Sterling, Kentucky, listed on the NRHP in Montgomery County, Kentucky
- Fitzpatrick-Harmon House, Prestonsburg, Kentucky, listed on the NRHP in Floyd County, Kentucky
- May-Fitzpatrick House, Prestonsburg, Kentucky, listed on the NRHP s in Floyd County, Kentucky
- Turner-Fitzpatrick House, Richmond, Kentucky, listed on the NRHP in Madison County, Kentucky

== See also ==
- Fitzpatrick Ranch Historic District, Avon, Montana, listed on the NRHP in Powell County, Montana
