= D. J. Brigham =

American football coach

Coaching career (HC unless noted)
- 1907: Cedarville

Head coaching record
- Overall: 0–1

D. J. Brigham was an American football coach. With J. R. Fitzpatrick, he was the co-head football coach at Cedarville University in 1907, compiling record of 0–1.

== Head coaching record ==
Year	Team	Overall	Conference	Standing	Bowl/playoffs
Cedarville Yellow Jackets (Independent) (1907)
1907	Cedarville	0–1			
Cedarville:		0–1			
Total:		0–1			
