= St Mary's Cathedral College Sydney =

St Mary's Cathedral College

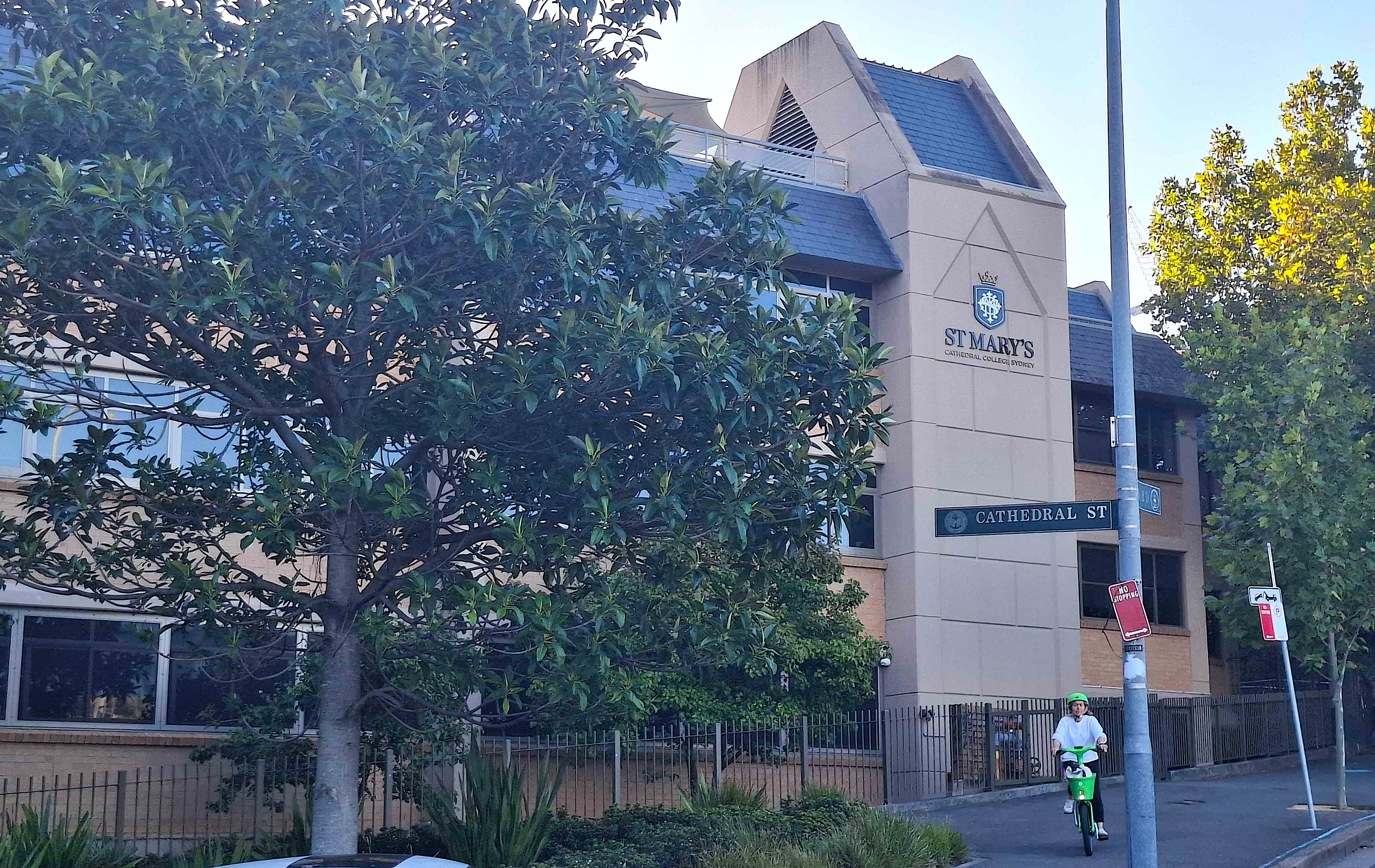
- College from The Domain, pictured in March 2026 after the transition to co-education

Location
- 2 St Mary's Rd, Sydney NSW 2000; Cathedral Road; Sydney central business district, New South Wales; Australia; 33°52′17″S 151°12′50″E

Information
- Type: Catholic systemic primary and secondary day school
- Motto: Latin: Vita ad plenam (Live life to the full (John 10:10))
- Religious affiliation: Catholicism
- Established: 1824; 202 years ago
- Founder: John Therry
- Educational authority: New South Wales Department of Education
- Oversight: Archdiocese of Sydney
- Trust: Edmund Rice Education Australia
- Principal: Kerrie McDiarmid
- Staff: c. 56
- Years offered: K–12
- Gender: Coeducational school
- Enrolment: c. 820 (2007)
- Campus type: Inner city
- Colours: Historically, prior to restructuring to co-education: Indigo, cerulean and white
- Website: smccsydney.syd.catholic.edu.au

St Mary's Cathedral College (SMCC) is a systemic coeducational Catholic day school for students, located in the central business district of Sydney, New South Wales, Australia. Founded in 1824, it is among the oldest schools in the country, currently catering for approximately 830 students from Kindergarten to Year 12. The college is administered by Sydney Catholic Schools of the Archdiocese of Sydney and operates as a systemic school; it is attached to St Mary's Cathedral. It serves as the choir school for the cathedral, and the choristers of St Mary's Cathedral Choir are drawn from the college. From 1910 until 2016 the college was the responsibility of the Congregation of Christian Brothers and was latterly administered via Edmund Rice Education Australia. It was the last school in Sydney to be served by Christian Brothers as both principal and deputy principal.

In 2022, St Mary's Cathedral College announced plans to transition from a single-sex boys school to a co-educational model.

== History ==
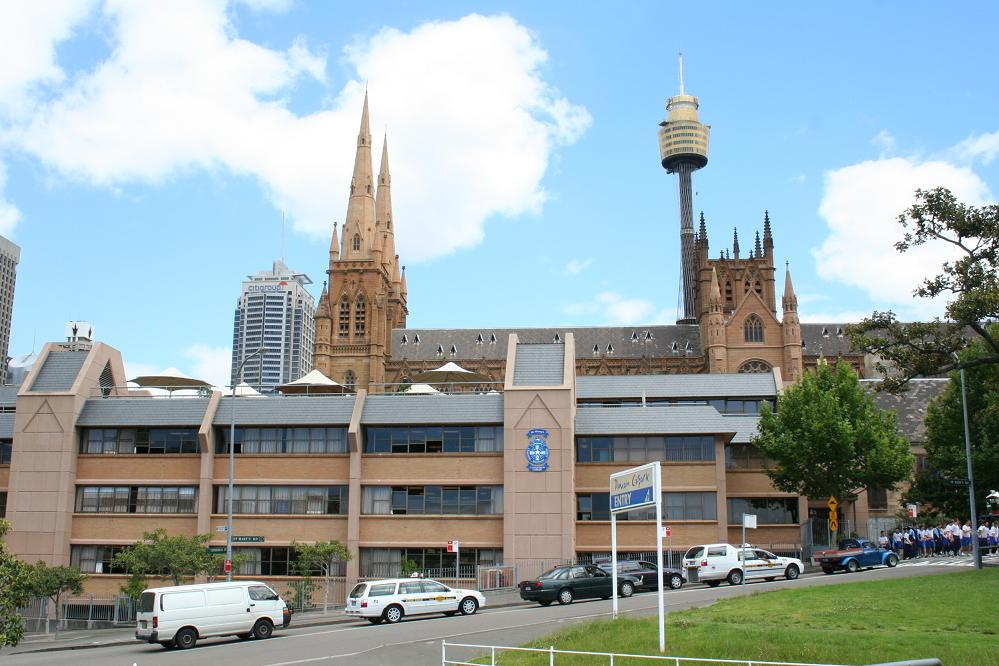
College from The Domain car park roof, pictured in December 2005 before the transition to co-education

St Mary's Cathedral College was established in 1824 as an elementary school by the Rev. John Therry. The high school was established in 1828. The school was conducted by the Christian Brothers and is administered by Sydney Catholic Schools, Eastern Region. The Christian Brothers association with the school dates back to 1911. Catholic education on the same site as St Mary's Cathedral has been continuous since 1824, except during the construction of the existing college buildings and the associated bishop's quarters (1987–1991). Schools on the site have been provided with staff by the Benedictine monks (1824–1882), the Marist Brothers (1883–1910), Sisters of Charity (1883–1967) and the Christian Brothers from 1910.

The replacement of the Marist order by the Christian Brothers in 1911 was controversial. The Marist Brothers had complained to the Archbishop of Sydney, Cardinal Patrick Francis Moran, about their working and living conditions. The cardinal ordered them to leave the college. He directed the Christian Brothers (under threat of interdict) to take over the college in their place, which they did. The cardinal then granted to the Christian Brothers the requests that the Marist Brothers had been denied. The college celebrated 100 years of Christian Brothers administration in 2011. Christian Brother administration of the college ended in 2016 after 105 years.

During the restructuring in 2022, new school branding and uniforms were designed and supplied by the Ranier schoolwear design group, which also designed the uniforms for the new amalgamated co-educational St Vincent's College in Ashfield.

== History after co-curricular transition ==
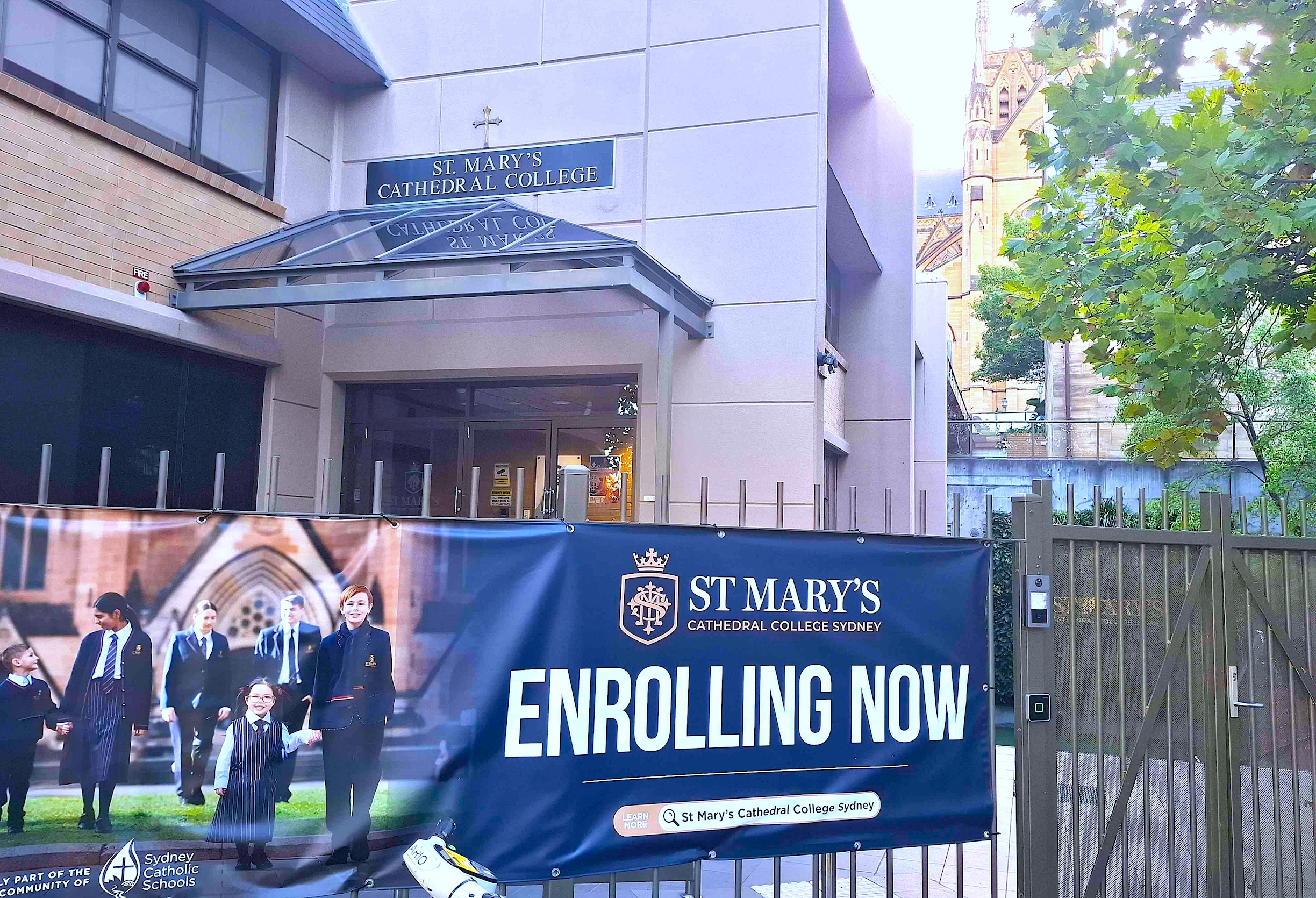
Front office of the college with an advertisement displaying students of both sexes to highlight the transition to co-education, pictured in March 2026

The college supports a musical tradition, with close ties to the St Mary's Cathedral Choir, Sydney, and the cathedral liturgies. A music captain is voted in annually to support the music coordinator with music-related activities in the college. It also supports sporting sides in all representative Northeast Conference seasonal/gala day sports and carnivals. At the conclusion of 2021, it was announced by Sydney Catholic Schools that the CBSA (Christian Brothers Sports Association) which the college was involved in for several years would come to a close, creating a new Northeast Conference that the college competes in since 2022. Students at the college have the option to participate in debating, public speaking, mock trial, Duke of Edinburgh Award, and assisting at the Matthew Talbot Hostel in Woolloomooloo.

== Principals ==
- Brother Michael Hoffman (1985–2000)
- Brother David Standen (2000–2010)
- Brother Christopher Peel (2011–2015)
- Michael Kelleher (2016–2022)
- Kerrie McDiarmid (2023–present)

== Notable alumni ==
- Anthony Albanese – 31st Prime Minister of Australia (2022–present), Leader of the Australian Labor Party and federal member for Grayndler
- James Freeman – cardinal; sixth Roman Catholic Archbishop of Sydney
- James Griffin – politician; Liberal Member for Manly
- Kevin "Horrie" Hastings – former professional rugby league footballer for the Sydney Roosters
- Hugh Donald "Huge Deal" McIntosh – theatrical entrepreneur, sporting promoter and newspaper proprietor
- Sir Edward McTiernan – longest serving Justice of the High Court of Australia; former Attorney-General of New South Wales; former Member of the Australian House of Representatives
- Hunter Page-Lochard – actor, known for Cleverman
- Joe Reaiche – former professional rugby league footballer for the Sydney Roosters, Canterbury Bulldogs and South Sydney Rabbitohs
- Jerry Skotadis – midfielder for the Sutherland Sharks and formerly Sydney FC
- Peter Triantis – central midfielder for the Sydney FC
- Aaron Woods – professional rugby league footballer for the Cronulla Sharks

== See also ==
- List of Catholic schools in New South Wales
- Catholic education in Australia
- List of Christian Brothers schools
- St Mary's Cathedral Choir, Sydney
- St Mary's Cathedral, Sydney
