= Edward Fitzpatrick =

Edward A. Fitzpatrick
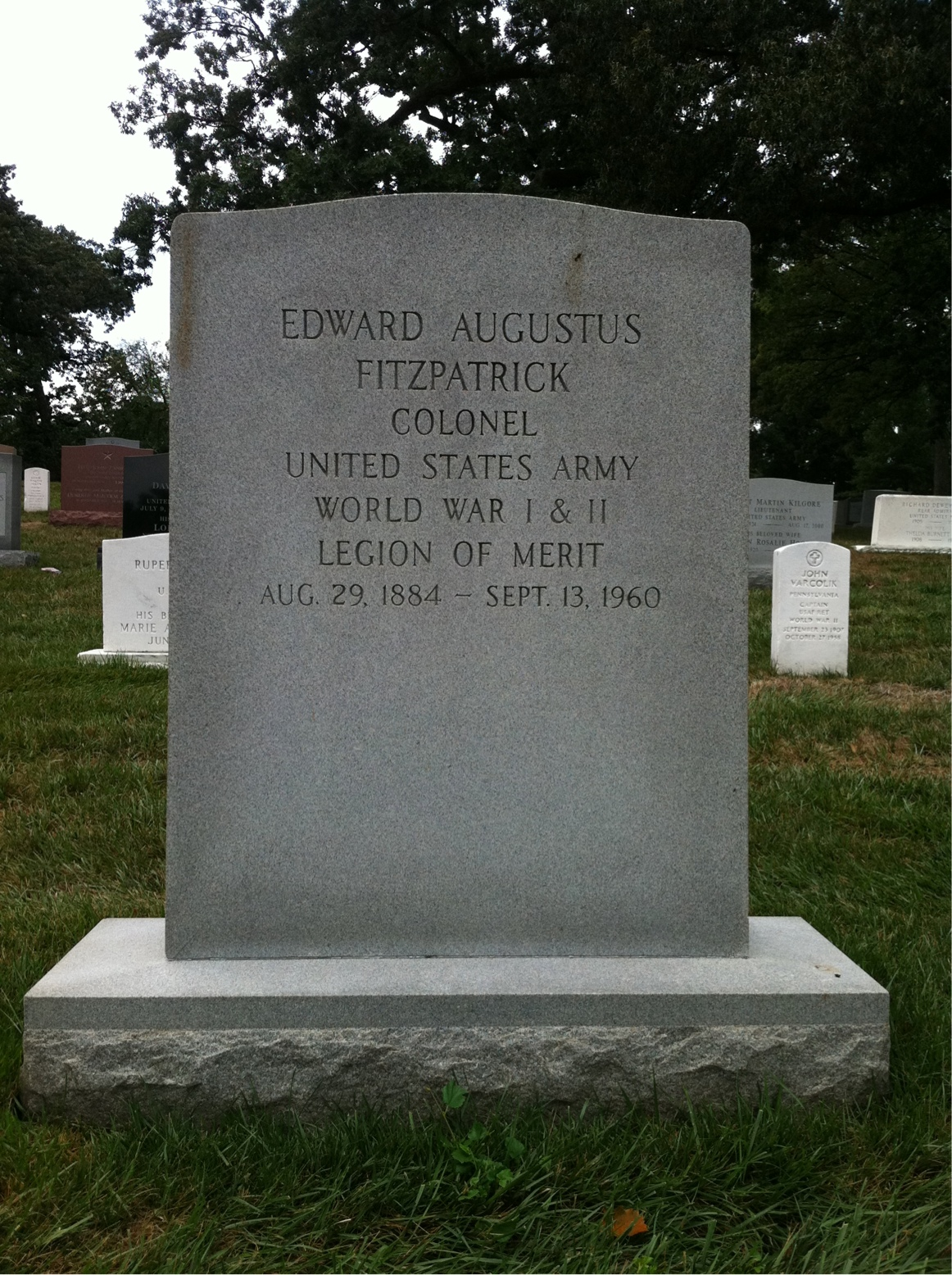
- Grave at Arlington National Cemetery
- Born: August 29, 1884; New York City, US
- Died: September 13, 1960 (aged 76); Washington D.C., US
- Education: Teachers College, Columbia University
- Occupations: College administrator, author, editor, government official, military officer, conscription expert
- Spouse: Lillian Fitzpatrick

Edward Augustus Fitzpatrick (August 29, 1884 – September 13, 1960) was an American college administrator, author, editor, government official, military officer, and conscription expert. From 1929 to 1954, he served as president of Mount Mary College in Milwaukee, Wisconsin. He was known for being one of the country's foremost experts on military draft policy during World War I and World War II.

== Early life and education ==
Edward A. Fitzpatrick was born on August 29, 1884, in New York City, where he studied at the New York Training School for Teachers. He earned his Bachelor of Science degree in 1906 from Teachers College, Columbia University, and received his Master of Arts the following year. In 1911, he earned his Doctor of Philosophy. While earning his advance degrees, Fitzpatrick taught from 1903 to 1908 in New York City public schools.

== Government and college administrator ==
In 1913, he became assigned to the Wisconsin State Board of Public Affairs, and drafted the first minimum wage for Wisconsin teachers. He was the state's military draft administrator during World War I and designed a conscription program that was considered a model for the rest of the country – Wisconsin was able to prepare men for service earlier than any other state. He served in the staff of Major General Enoch Crowder, administrator of the Selective Service Act of 1917. After the war, Fitzpatrick became secretary of the board of the Wisconsin State Board of Education, until its abolishment in 1923.

In 1924, Fitzpatrick became the first dean of the Marquette University Graduate School, located in Milwaukee. In 1929, Fitzpatrick's son Edward A. Fitzpatrick Jr. died, and in his honor the boy's father donated 500 volumes and $500 to Marquette University High School for its memorial library the following year. Fitzpatrick was appointed in 1929 as the president of Mount Mary College, a small Catholic women's college, when it moved from Prairie du Chien to Milwaukee. He would continue to hold this role until 1954. During the Great Depression, he was also the chairman of the State Recovery Board and the National Recovery Administration conciliation board.

Fitzpatrick developed a reputation for his knowledge of draft policy. By 1940, he was considered one of the country's "foremost authorities in conscription," as he published Conscription and America: A Study of Conscription in a Democracy in the summer of that year. This work "became the bible of hundreds of military officers in their study of the subject." One publication would declare in 1948 that "perhaps no man in the country ever made a more thorough study of compulsory military training." During World War II, he helped train men for service at Camp Grant in Rockford, Illinois, and traveled from Milwaukee to Washington, D.C., many times early in the war to help officials prepare for conscription, using parts of his 1940 book to advise them. He was a lieutenant colonel in the Army and served under the leadership of General Lewis Blaine Hershey, director of the Selective Service System.

Fitzpatrick acted as editor of the Catholic School Journal for 25 years. After his retirement from Mount Mary, he moved to Washington, D.C., in 1954, where he died on September 13, 1960. He was buried in Arlington National Cemetery. He and wife Lillian Fitzpatrick had three sons.

== Publications ==
- The Educational Views and Influence of De Witt Clinton (1911)
- Budget Making in a Democracy
- Experts in City Government (editor)
- The Scholarship of Teachers in Secondary Schools: The Sachs Prize Essay of 1926 (1926)
- In the Service of God (1938)
- The Autobiography of a College (1939), co-written with Sister Mary Dominic
- Conscription and America: A Study of Conscription in a Democracy (1940)
