= Kevin Fitzpatrick =

Kevin Fitzpatrick may refer to:

- Kevin Fitzpatrick (Gaelic footballer), Gaelic football player from County Laois in Ireland
- Kevin Fitzpatrick (Irish footballer) (born 1943), soccer player from Limerick in Ireland
- Kevin C. Fitzpatrick (born 1966), American non-fiction writer
