= Fitzpatrick Building =

- U.S. National Register of Historic Places
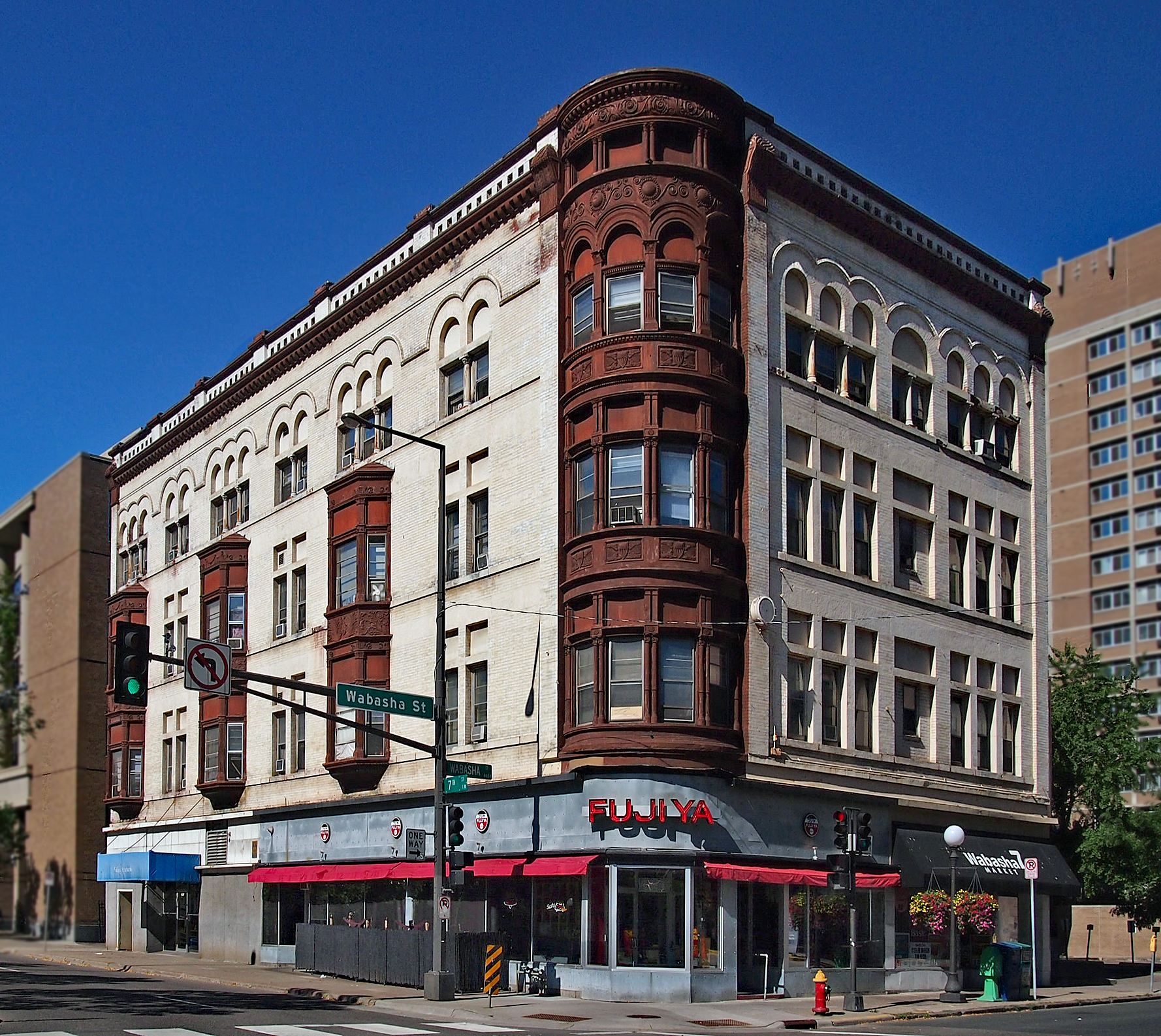

- Location within Minnesota Location within the United States
- Location: 465-467 Wabasha Street North; Saint Paul, Minnesota
- Coordinates: 44°56′53.5″N 93°5′50″W
- Built: 1890
- Architect: Fitzpatrick, Thomas
- Architectural style: Queen Anne
- NRHP reference No.: 90001113
- Added to NRHP: July 19, 1990

The Fitzpatrick Building in Saint Paul, Minnesota, United States, is an 1890 Queen Anne style commercial building featuring corner turret and pressed-metal relief. It is listed on the National Register of Historic Places.

The Fitzpatrick building was built and designed in 1890 by developer Thomas Fitzpatrick. The building originally housed retail and commercial businesses on the first floor, professional offices on the second floor, and apartments on the third and fourth floors. In 1901, the second, third, and fourth floors were converted to hotel rooms. In 1963, the hotel rooms were converted back to apartments. Known more recently as the Viking Apartments, the building housed low income tenants until being sold in the Spring of 2019 to CCI Properties, who will undertake full restoration of the building into a mixture of affordable and market-rate housing in early 2020. Other upgrades will include a sprinkler system, new electrical systems and restoration of the building's original conical turret.

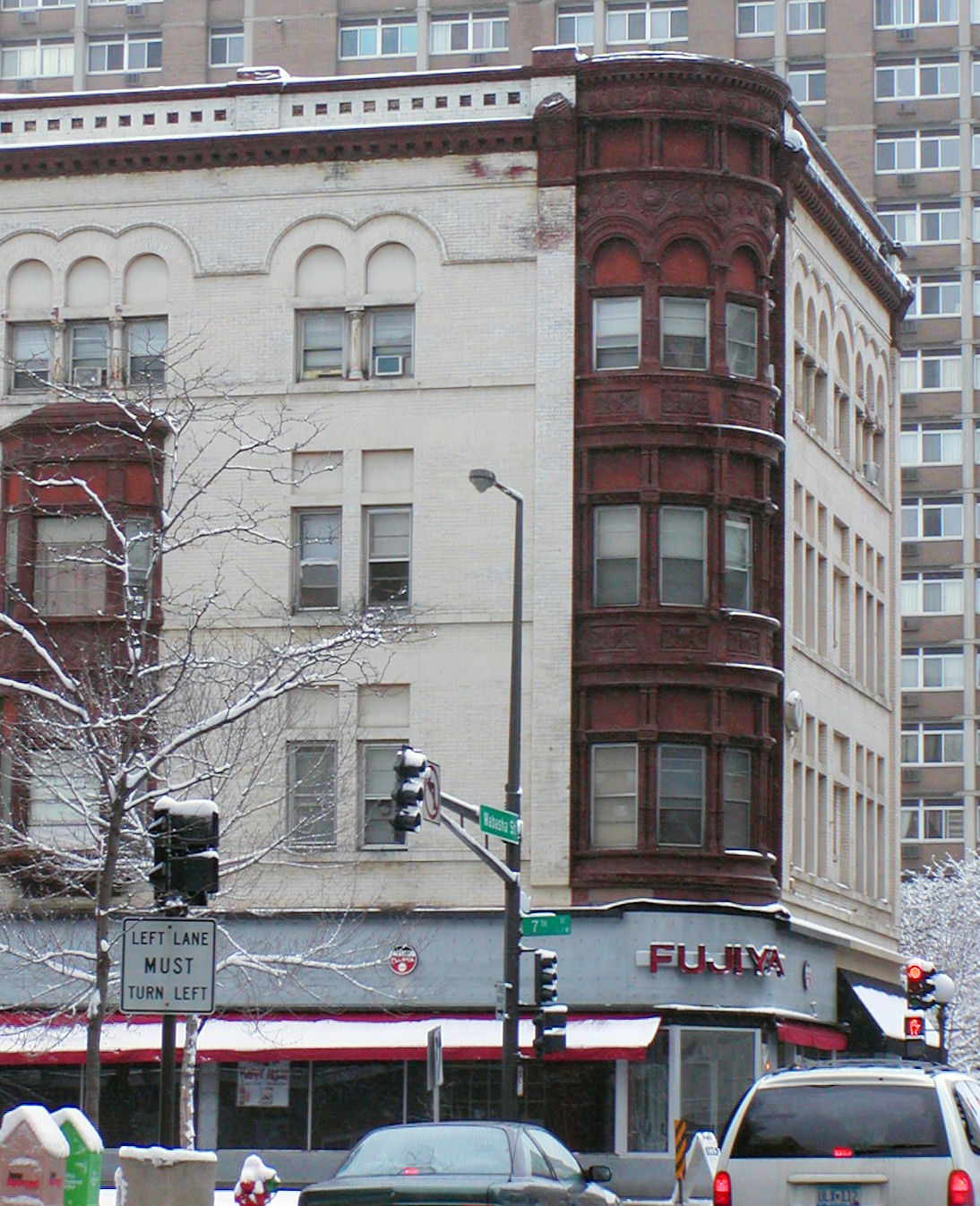
Detail of the turret feature.
