= Michael Fitzpatrick (cellist) =

American cellist and composer

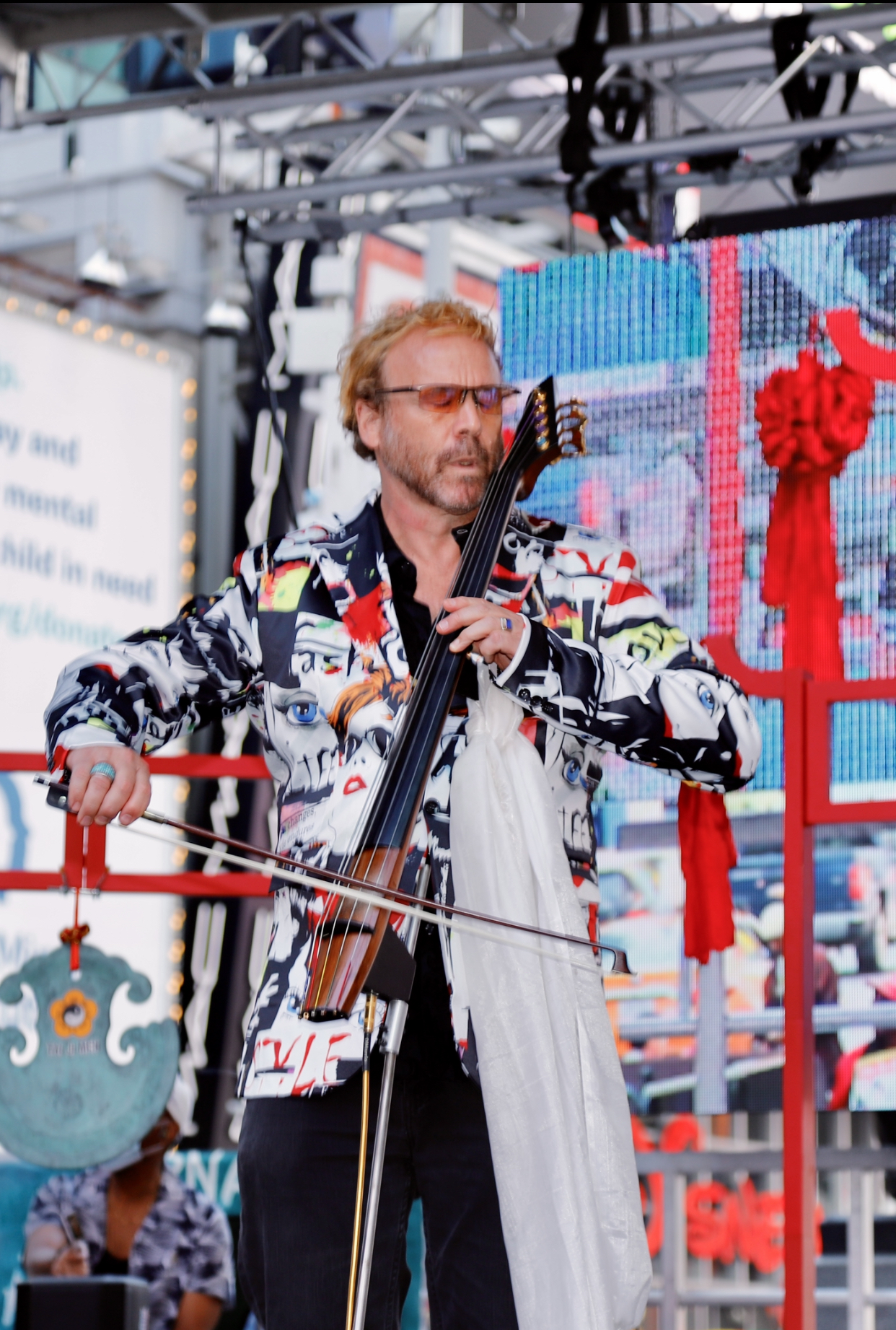
- Fitzpatrick performing in 2023
- Born: December 5, 1964 (age 61); Columbus, Ohio, US
- Occupation: Musician
- Years active: 1994–present
- Website: michaelfitzpatrick.com

Michael Fitzpatrick is an American cellist and composer. He has performed the Musical Keynotes for the Dalai Lama's public talks and teachings worldwide. He performed the musical keynote for Pope Francis' Blessing Ceremony at The Vatican.

== Musical background ==
His father, Joseph, of Irish, Catalan and French descent, was an artist and professor of art. His sister, Josephine, is co-principal violist of the Barcelona Symphony Orchestra.

== Performance career ==
Fitzpatrick has performed in the former Soviet Union, the Middle East, India, Australia, and numerous tours across the United States and Canada. He has performed as cello soloist at the Hollywood Bowl, Lincoln Center, Town Hall, and the Aspen Music Festival.

== Film and television ==
Fitzpatrick conceived, produced, and directed the forthcoming Tuning the Planet, the film-companion to the Compassion album, recorded and filmed inside Mammoth Cave, the largest cave-system in the world. Tuning the Planet features a message from the Dalai Lama, the voice of Thomas Merton, Cello Solos by Fitzpatrick, Tibet's Drepung Loseling Monks and the fusion musicians of Millenia Music. Compassion was nominated for a Special Merit Award at the Grammy Awards by Bruce Lundvall, who stated: "Compassion is at once both a prayer and an aural celebration of brotherhood and world peace. It has the power to bring feelings of hope and human compassion to all who listen".

== Music director ==
Fitzpatrick served as Co-Music Director of The Muhammad Ali Humanitarian Awards. He is the founder of Millenia Music.
