= Spike Fitzpatrick =

American lawyer

Richard S. Fitzpatrick, more commonly known as "Spike" Fitzpatrick (November 26, 1948 – March 20, 2006) was an American lawyer best known for his representation of Ted Williams and involvement in the Alcor Life Extension Foundation dispute over Williams' body.

He represented the Citrus County School District for 28 years.

The Richard "Spike" Fitzpatrick Award is given by the Florida School Board Attorneys Association to specially recognize service for one of the districts. The most recent award was given out in 2011.
