= Alice Patrick =

American painter and sculptor

- Born: 1948 (age 77–78); Los Angeles
- Education: Art Center College of Design, Otis Art Institute
- Known for: Murals

Alice Patrick (born 1948) is an American muralist and sculptor. Her murals are recognized by the City of Los Angeles as the first painted within the city by an African-American woman.

== Biography ==
Patrick was born and raised in Los Angeles where she studied first at the Art Center College of Design and later at the Otis Art Institute. She is also a former elementary school art teacher.

== Work ==
Patrick was part of the Citywide Mural Project in Los Angeles. She painted in South Los Angeles, however, her mural of historic women in Black History, completed in the mid-1970s, was destroyed soon after its completion. One of her later murals, "Women Do Get Weary (but They Don't Give Up" (1991) was sponsored by the Social and Public Art Resource Center (SPARC). The mural shows images of Mary McCleod Bethune, Dorothy Height, Oprah Winfrey, Josephine Baker and others. Patrick painted herself into the mural as well. The mural is approximately nine feet by sixteen feet and is painted in acrylic on stucco. In 2013, the mural underwent restoration by SPARC in order to fix the peeling paint and faded colors.

In the 1990s Patrick was selling limited edition prints of activists involved in the civil rights movement. Cooper's Originals, a gallery in Los Angeles, helped promote her work, marketing her reproductions. Later, she opened her own gallery called Aliceland, which she ran for ten years.
