= Fitzpatrick Rock =

Rock in Antarctica

- Location within Antarctica

Geography
- Location: Antarctica
- Coordinates: 66°16′S 110°30′E
- Archipelago: Windmill Islands

Administration
- Administered under the Antarctic Treaty System

Demographics
- Population: Uninhabited

Fitzpatrick Rock is a low ice-capped rock lying 1 kilometre (1/2 nmi) northwest of Kilby Island at the mouth of Newcomb Bay, in the Windmill Islands, Antarctica. It was first charted in February 1957 by a party from the USS Glacier. The name was suggested by Lt. Robert C. Newcomb, USN, navigator of the Glacier, for Boatswain's Mate 2nd Class John Fitzpatrick, USN, member of the survey party.

== See also ==
- Composite Antarctic Gazetteer
- List of Antarctic and sub-Antarctic islands
- List of Antarctic islands south of 60° S
- SCAR
- Territorial claims in Antarctica
