= Brenda Jean Patrick =

American educational consultant

Brenda Jean Patrick (born 1955) is a Texas-based educational consultant and a member of the North Texas Municipal Water District Board of Directors. She has been named a Texas History Teacher of the Year and was the Texas Educational Support Staff Association's 2007 Administrator of the Year.

== Career ==
Brenda Jean Patrick attended East Texas State University, where she was named to the dean's list in the spring 1981 semester. She matriculated with a bachelor's degree and a master's degree. She became an educational consultant known for her position within the educational community that students and parents are customers that the educational system must serve. Patrick was a master consultant with the Region 10 Education Service Center, where she was one of the first consultants to bring the concept of customer care to school districts in Texas. This work has resulted in heightened awareness among school administrators of the need to strengthen the lines of communication with parents, businesses and the community in order to increase student achievement in all areas of academic endeavor. These programs utilize customer care strategies and techniques that have been effective for companies in industries serving large numbers of customers.

She has served as board member for Friends of Texas Public Schools. In 2019, Patrick was appointed to the North Texas Municipal Water District Board of Directors representing the City of Mesquite, Texas.

== Honors ==
Patrick was named a Texas History Teacher of the Year. In 2007, the Texas Educational Support Staff Association named her Administrator of the Year.
