= Hugh Fitzpatrick =

Australian rules footballer

Personal information
- Full name: Hugh James Fitzpatrick
- Born: 19 July 1872; Geelong, Victoria
- Died: 1 January 1925 (aged 52); Moonee Ponds, Victoria
- Position: Forward / Ruck

Playing career^{1}
Years	Club	Games (Goals)
1899–1900	Essendon	30 (26)
- ^{1} Playing statistics correct to the end of 1900.

Hugh James Fitzpatrick (19 July 1872 – 1 January 1925) was an Australian rules footballer who played with Essendon in the Victorian Football League (VFL).
