= Tommy Fitzpatrick =

American artist

- Born: 1969 (age 56–57); Dallas, Texas
- Education: University of Texas at Austin (B.A.); Yale University (M.F.A.)
- Occupations: Artist and Professor
- Title: Associate Professor at Texas State University
- Website: www.tommyfitzpatrick.com

Tommy Fitzpatrick is an American artist. He is known for his work depicting urban architectural forms in his paintings. Fitzpatrick is also an associate professor at Texas State University in San Marcos.

== Early life and education ==
Fitzpatrick was born in 1969 in Dallas, Texas. In 1991 he graduated from the University of Texas at Austin. After his BA he received an MFA from Yale University in 1993. Fitzpatrick is currently an associate professor at Texas State University in San Marcos.

== Career ==
In addition to exhibitions in various Texas metropolises, Fitzpatrick has exhibited in New York, Madrid, London, Berlin and Seoul. In 1999, he held an exhibition of his work at the Inman Gallery of Texas Contemporary Art in Houston, a place he has exhibited other works over time as well. In February 2013, Fitzpatrick opened the solo exhibition Electric Labyrinth, consisting of fifteen paintings depicting a Tokyo store in varying degrees of abstraction. In November 2017 he opened a solo exhibition entitled Crystal Cities, at the Holly Johnson Gallery in Dallas. The paintings in the exhibition were inspired by the unrealized architectural project of the same name designed by Frank Lloyd Wright.

Fitzpatrick's work is a part of the permanent collection of the Museum of Fine Arts, Houston, including his paintings Study for 610 and 610. His works are also a part of the permanent collections of the Art Museum of South Texas and the Modern Art Museum of Fort Worth.

== Style ==
Fitzpatrick’s work has been described as blending photo-realism and abstraction. Much of his paintings are done in acrylic, and depict contemporary urban buildings and sculptures. He has also created series after ideas from popular culture, such as the Edwin Abbott Abbott novel Flatland. Fitzpatrick has stated of his chosen subjects that, "modern architecture is a visual language." Art News stated of his work that it, "capture[s] the tireless motion of the city in geometries that unite the forms of nature with the man-made."
