= Mulpatrick =

Surname

The surname Mulpatrick originates from the Irish surname O' Maol Phadraig. One of the locations the name is first recorded is in Clogher in County Tyrone.

Teallach Maoilpatraig, listed in Topographical Poems by O’Dugan, under Cinel Fearadhaigh. "The most noble of Cinel Fearadhaigh ... Tellach Maoilpatraic". (Cenél Fearadhaigh is a branch of the Cenél nEógain in east Tyrone.)

Máel Pátraic ‘devotee of Patrick. O Maol Phadraig translates into follower of (St) Patrick. It became O'Mulpatrick and Mulpatrick and the first recorded instances of the surname appear in records from the late 16th century in counties Cavan, Fermanagh, Monaghan, Meath, Westmeath, Longford, and Cork . Its current anglicised form is Fitzpatrick.

In 2019 Fitzpatrick/O'Mulpatrick of Breifne – Ó Maol Phádraig Breifne was registered with the Clans of Ireland. This is one of the clans of the Fitzpatrick Clan Society.
