= Marquette University Graduate School =

Coordinates: 43.038885°N 87.929415°W

The Graduate School, Marquette University
- Type: Private, Graduate-level
- Affiliations: Catholic, Jesuit
- Dean: Dr. Douglas Woods
- Students: 3,056 (Fall 2016)
- Location: 1324 W. Wisconsin Ave, Milwaukee, WI, United States
- Campus: Urban
- Website: marquette.edu/grad

The Graduate School is one of the primary colleges at Marquette University, located in Milwaukee, Wisconsin. The college oversees an array of liberal arts, interdisciplinary, and applied and physical sciences programs at the graduate level, offering master's and doctoral degrees as well as graduate certificates. The Graduate School's offices are housed within Holthusen Hall, near the center of Marquette's campus.

== Academics ==
The Graduate School offers 38 graduate programs across 20 degree types, primarily in liberal arts-related fields like the natural sciences, social and cultural sciences, philosophy and theology, but also in fields like neuroscience, dispute resolution and computational science. Degrees conferred upon graduates include Master of Arts, Master of Science, Master of Engineering, Master of Education, Master of Business Administration, Master of Science in Nursing, Doctor of Nursing Practice, Doctor of Philosophy (PhD), and several graduate certificate options.

While Marquette does offer other post-baccalaureate degree programs, such as Doctor of Dental Surgery and Doctor of Physical Therapy programs, several of these degrees are managed and conferred upon graduates by separate schools and colleges, including the College of Health Sciences and School of Dentistry.

=== Accreditation ===
Marquette University as a whole is accredited by the North Central Association of Colleges and Secondary Schools, and the specific departments under the school's purview have multiple accreditation and licensing bodies for their various programs. For example, the psychology program is accredited by the American Psychological Association and the American Chemical Society has licensed Marquette's undergraduate and graduate degrees in chemistry, molecular biology, biochemistry, and Chemistry for the Professions.
