= Columbus Fitzpatrick =

Columbus Fitzpatrick (1810 – 8 November 1877) was an Irish-born Australian builder, political activist and amateur historian.

He was born in Dublin to Bernard Fitzpatrick, later chief bailiff for the Supreme Court of New South Wales, and Catherine Milling. He migrated to New South Wales with his family in 1811, and grew up at Windsor and Parramatta. He was taught by his mother, an active Catholic who founded the St Mary's Cathedral Choir. He was assistant to Philip Conolly and John Joseph Therry, and in 1826 was an apprentice coachbuilder.

He was granted land at Narara near Gosford in 1830, and in 1838 moved to Goulburn, where he became a builder and occasional undertaker. In 1845 he married Margaret Gilligan, with whom he had six children. He was an advocate on behalf of free selectors, free trade and labour rights, but his candidature for the 1856 colonial election in the seat of Argyle saw him receive zero votes. The local council was dissolved in 1863 and Fizpatrick was appointed overseer of local works, a position he held until 1868. He was an alderman from 1873, and made several unsuccessful runs for the mayoralty. He contributed extensively to the local press, largely on colonial history. His articles were used by Cardinal Patrick Moran in 1895. Fitzpatrick died in 1877, having fallen ill after leading a funeral in poor weather.
