= Mary Fitzpatrick (photographer) =

English photographer

Mary Fitzpatrick (born 1968 in England) is a photographer. Fitzpatrick is known for her images of spaces abandoned after conflict. In 2004 she exhibited images of post Gulf War Kuwait - 'Failaka' as part of the 'Streets of Desire' Exhibition curated by Jump Ship Rat at the Blade Factory, Greenland street in the Liverpool Biennial Independents. She also took part in the Chobi Mela IV International Photography Festival in Dhaka at the British Council in 2007.

Fitzpatrick was shortlisted for the Liverpool Art Prize in 2008.
