= Joyce Ann Fitzpatrick =

American politician from Maine

Member of the Maine House of Representatives for the 8th District (Houlton)
- In office December 2010 – December 2014

Personal details
- Born: November 24, 1942 (age 83) Houlton, Maine
- Party: Republican
- Education: Ricker College
- Profession: Insurance Agent

Joyce Ann Fitzpatrick (born November 24, 1942) is an American from Maine. A Republican, Fitzpatrick represented the town of Houlton, Aroostook County, Maine in the Maine House of Representatives. She was first elected in 2010 and served until 2014. During the 126th Legislature (2013–14), Fitzpatrick served as the ranking minority member on the insurance and financial services committee.
