= Fitzpatrick, West Virginia =

Unincorporated community in West Virginia, United States

Fitzpatrick
- Unincorporated community
- Location within the state of West Virginia Fitzpatrick (the United States)
- Coordinates: 37°44′38″N 81°11′11″W
- Country: United States
- State: West Virginia
- County: Raleigh
- Elevation: 2,182 ft (665 m)
- Time zone: UTC-5 (Eastern (EST))
  - Summer (DST): UTC-4 (EDT)
- GNIS ID: 1549682

Fitzpatrick is an unincorporated community in Raleigh County, West Virginia.
