= Jim Fitzpatrick (sound engineer) =

American sound engineer

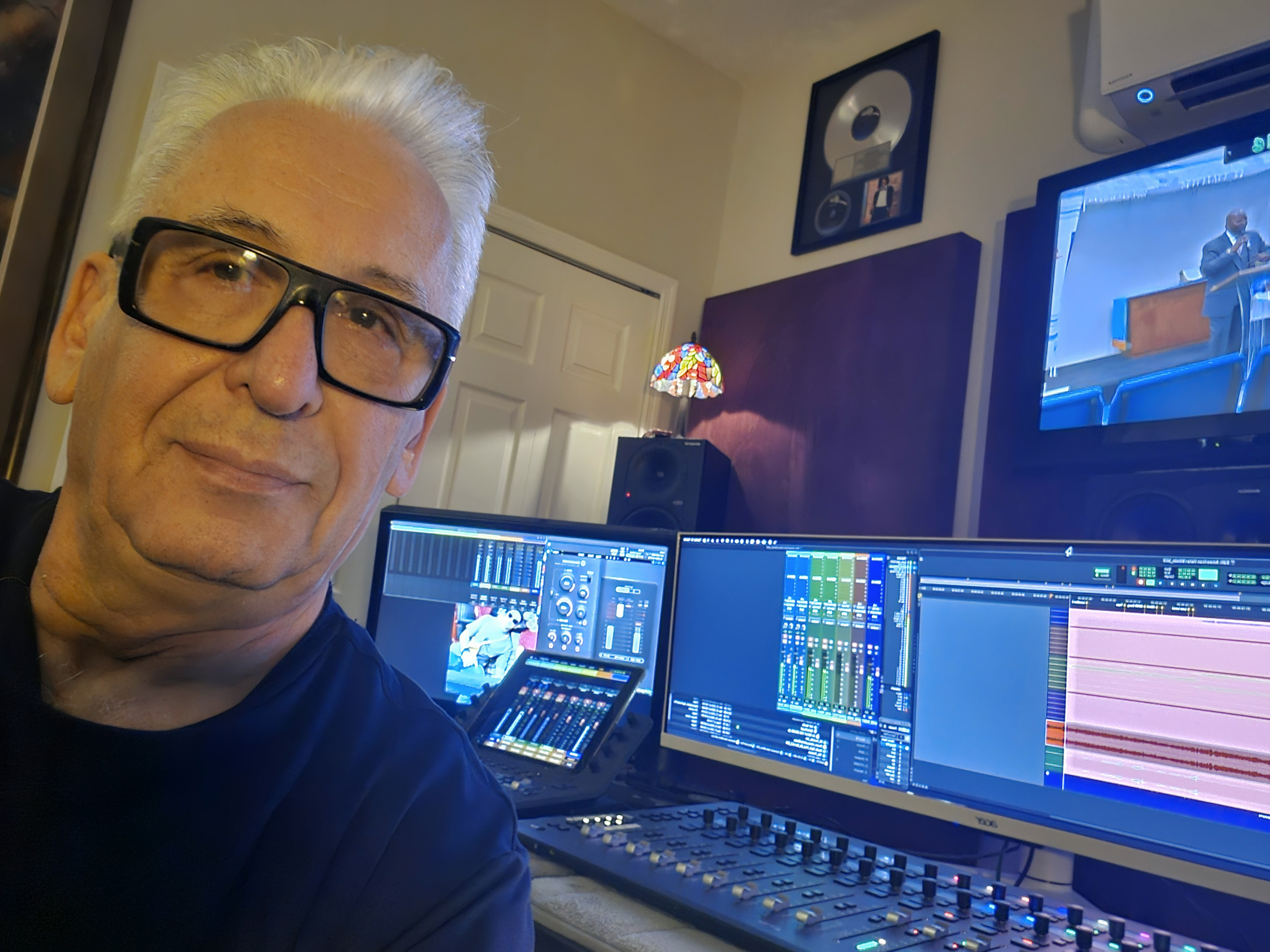
- Fitzpatrick in 2025
- Occupation: Sound engineer

Jim Fitzpatrick is an American sound engineer. He won a Primetime Emmy Award in the category Outstanding Sound Mixing for his work on the episode "Road to the North Pole" of the television program Family Guy. His win was shared with Patrick S. Clark. He has been nominated for six more, including two nominations for his work on the television program The Simpsons.
