= Jim Fitzpatrick (footballer) =

Australian rules footballer

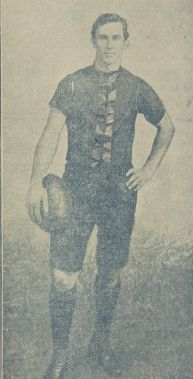

Personal information
- Full name: James Neilson Fitzpatrick
- Born: 21 July 1886; Stratford, Victoria
- Died: 9 September 1960 (aged 74); Fitzroy, Victoria
- Original team: Heyfield

Playing career^{1}
Years	Club	Games (Goals)
1907–13	Melbourne	81 (39)
1913	Richmond	7 (0)
Total		88 (39)
- ^{1} Playing statistics correct to the end of 1913.

James Neilson Fitzpatrick (21 July 1886 – 9 September 1960) was an Australian rules footballer who played with Melbourne and Richmond in the Victorian Football League (VFL).

== Family ==
The second of eight children born to John Fitzpatrick (1858–1936) and Ada Rosina Imrie (1858–1941), James Neilson Fitzpatrick was born at Stratford, Victoria on 21 July 1886.

In 1916, Fitzpatrick married Myrtle Norma Cleary (1892-1922) however she died young and they had no surviving children.

== Football ==
=== Hawthorn (MJFA) ===
Fitzpatrick played for Hawthorn in the Metropolitan Junior Football Association (MJFA) during the first part of the 1907 season.

=== Melbourne ===
Described as originally being from Heyfield, Fitzpatrick played consistently for Melbourne from mid 1907 through until July 1910.

In mid-1910 he left Melbourne and returned to Stratford, playing country football until the middle of 1911 when he returned to Melbourne.

=== Richmond ===
Having played the first six rounds of the 1913 VFL season with Melbourne, in July 1913 Fitzpatrick moved to Richmond. He played 7 consecutive games from Round 12 to 18.

=== Maffra ===
In 1914 Fitzpatrick returned to the country and played for Maffra in the Gippsland League, being the victim in an on-field assault that led to criminal charges in September. He continued to play until the 1927 season.

== Later life ==
Fitzpatrick worked as a storeman, living in Hawthorn for the period following his football career. After his father’s death in 1936 he returned to Heyfield to work on the family farm.

In 1937 Jim Fitzpatrick married Eva May Cleary, a schoolteacher and the older sister of his first wife, Myrtle Cleary.

Fitzpatrick enlisted to serve in World War II, serving in the Volunteer Defence Corps from 1942 to 1945.

James Neilson Fitzpatrick died on 9 September 1960 and was cremated at Springvale Botanical Cemetery.
