= Fitzpatrick-Harmon House =

- U.S. National Register of Historic Places
- Location within Kentucky
- Location: 102 E. Court St., Prestonsburg, Kentucky
- Coordinates: 37°40′07″N 82°46′20″W
- Area: less than one acre
- Built: c.1890, 1904, c.1950
- Architectural style: Late Victorian, Vernacular Victorian
- MPS: Prestonsburg MPS
- NRHP reference No.: 89000388
- Added to NRHP: May 18, 1989

The Fitzpatrick-Harmon House, at 102 E. Court St. in Prestonsburg, Kentucky, was built in 1890. It was listed on the National Register of Historic Places in 1989.

It was described in 1988 as a two-story central passage plan house with a side-gabled roof. Its main section was built around 1890 and was modified in 1904. A two-story Colonial Revival-style portico was added in the 1950s. It was stated that "Although somewhat altered, the house is clearly recognizable as a product of its time and place."

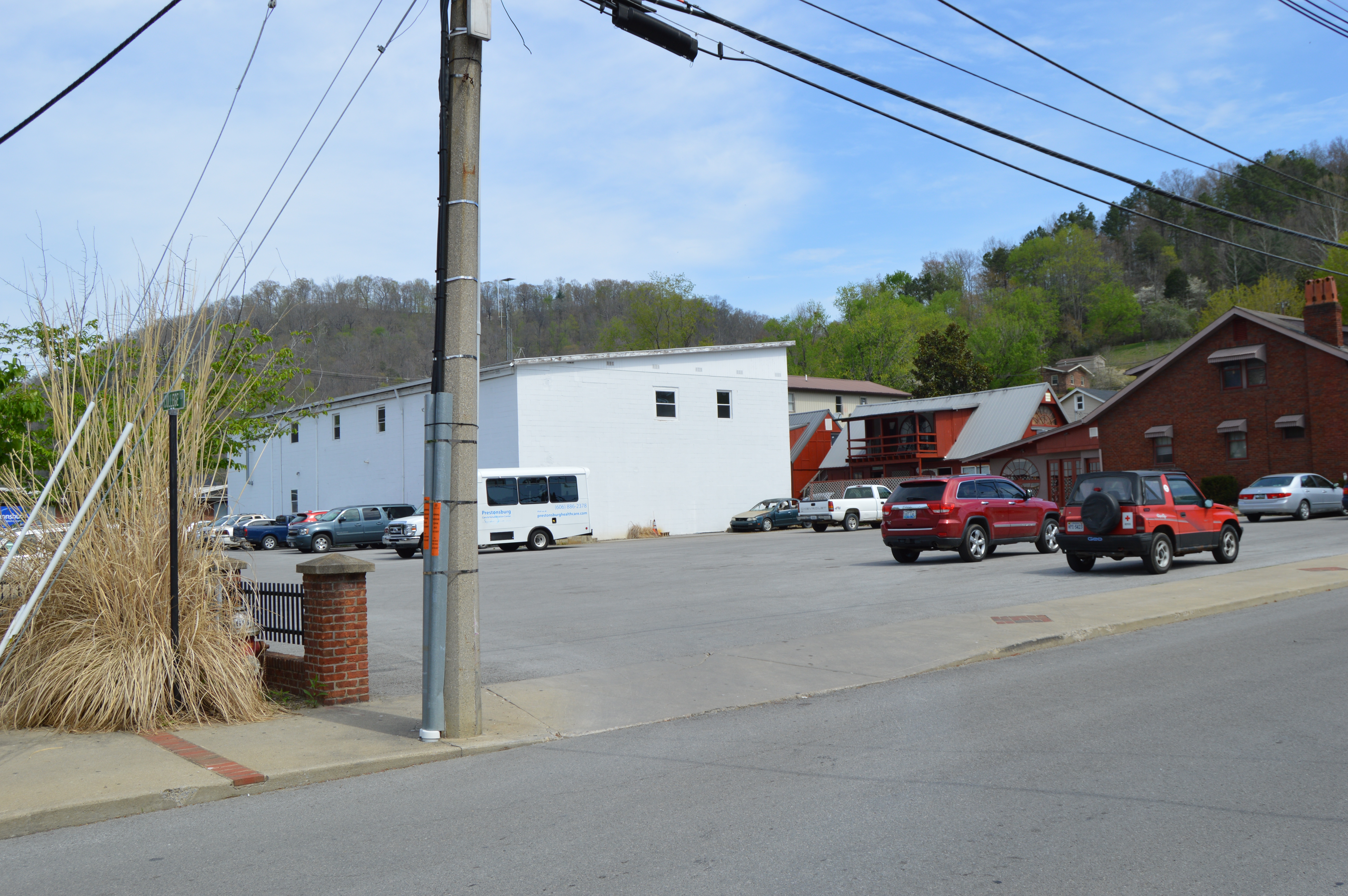
Parking lot on site of house

The house no longer exists at that location.
