= Lisa K. Fitzpatrick =

Physician and healthcare advocate

Lisa Kathleen Fitzpatrick is an American infectious disease physician, epidemiologist, and public health expert known for her work on health literacy, health equity, and racial health disparities.

== Education ==
Fitzpatrick earned a B.A. and an M.D. from University of Missouri-Kansas City in 1992. She was a resident at St. Vincent Hospital in Indianapolis, an infectious diseases fellow at the University of Colorado Health Sciences Center, and received a master's degree from the University of California-Berkeley in 2001. In 2015 Fitzpatrick completed a master's degree at the John F. Kennedy School of Government.

== Biography ==
Fitzpatrick's early work was at the Center for Disease Control and Prevention where she specialized in the investigation of tuberculosis and was a diplomat in global health in the Caribbean. She also worked on education of people about HIV/AIDS while she worked in the San Francisco Department of Health and in this context she spoke with the Washington Post about getting people tested for HIV. Her published work in this realm assessed people's thoughts on the medical care they received regarding tuberculosis and health disparities in communities affected by HIV. Fitzpatrick founded Grapevine Health to improve health literacy and education for under-resourced communities and, as of 2022, she is a lecturer and adjunct professor at George Washington University School of Medicine & Health Sciences.

Fitzpatrick is known for her work in increasing people's understanding of human health, particularly with respect to personal health. During the COVID-19 pandemic, Fitzpatrick shared her experience with getting vaccinated with other people in order to encourage other people to get vaccinated. She goes by "Dr. Lisa" while presenting outreach, a program where she interacts with people on the street to talk about healthcare. In 2020 Fitzpatrick was named as one of five people to serve on President Joe Biden's committee for healthcare policy, and she was a member of the round table on health literacy group at the National Academies of Science, Engineering, and Medicine.

== Selected publications ==
- Fitzpatrick, Lisa K.; Hardacker, Jo Ann; Heirendt, Wendy; Agerton, Tracy; Streicher, Amy; Melnyk, Heather; Ridzon, Renee; Valway, Sarah; Onorato, Ida (2001). "A Preventable Outbreak of Tuberculosis Investigated through an Intricate Social Network". Clinical Infectious Diseases. 33 (11): 1801–1806. doi:10.1086/323671. ISSN 1058-4838. PMID 11692291.
- Fitzpatrick, Lisa K.; Okwera, A; Mugerwa, R; Ridzon, R; Ellner, J; Onorato, I (2002-06-01). "An investigation of suspected exogenous reinfection in tuberculosis patients in Kampala, Uganda". The International Journal of Tuberculosis and Lung Disease. 6 (6): 550–552. doi:10.5588/09640569513084. PMID 12068990.
- Fitzpatrick, Lisa K.; Sutton, Madeline; Greenberg, Alan E. (2006). "Toward eliminating health disparities in HIV/AIDS: the importance of the minority investigator in addressing scientific gaps in Black and Latino communities". Journal of the National Medical Association. 98 (12): 1906–1911. ISSN 0027-9684. PMC 2569682. PMID 17225832.
- Sohler, Nancy Lynn; Fitzpatrick, Lisa K.; Lindsay, Rebecca G.; Anastos, Kathryn; Cunningham, Chinazo O. (2007-10-17). "Does Patient–Provider Racial/Ethnic Concordance Influence Ratings of Trust in People with HIV Infection?". AIDS and Behavior. 11 (6): 884–896. doi:10.1007/s10461-007-9212-0. ISSN 1090-7165. PMID 17351738. S2CID 23337119.
- Sanchez, Travis H; Sullivan, Patrick S; Rothman, Richard E; Brown, Emily H; Fitzpatrick, Lisa K; Wood, Angela F; Hernandez, Paloma I; Nunn, Amy S; Serota, Martin L; Moreno-Walton, Lisa (2014-07-31). "A Novel Approach to Realizing Routine HIV Screening and Enhancing Linkage to Care in the United States: Protocol of the FOCUS Program and Early Results". JMIR Research Protocols. 3 (3): e39. doi:10.2196/resprot.3378. ISSN 1929-0748. PMC 4129189. PMID 25093431.

== Selected awards and honors ==
In 2011, the University of Missouri – Kansas City's medical school gave Fitzpatrick the E. Grey Dimond Take Wing Award.
