= Tony Fitzpatrick (engineer) =

British engineer (1951–2003)

- Born: 9 June 1951; London, England
- Died: 26 July 2003 (aged 52); Fresno, California, US
- Education: Leeds University, Leeds, UK
- Engineering career
- Discipline: Structural engineer
- Institutions: Institution of Structural Engineers
- Practice name: Arup
- Projects: Tate Modern; 30 St Mary Axe; Millennium Bridge; British Library

Anthony James Fitzpatrick FREng HonFRIBA (9 June 1951 – 26 July 2003) was an English-born American structural engineer who was director of the Arup Group.

== Life and career ==
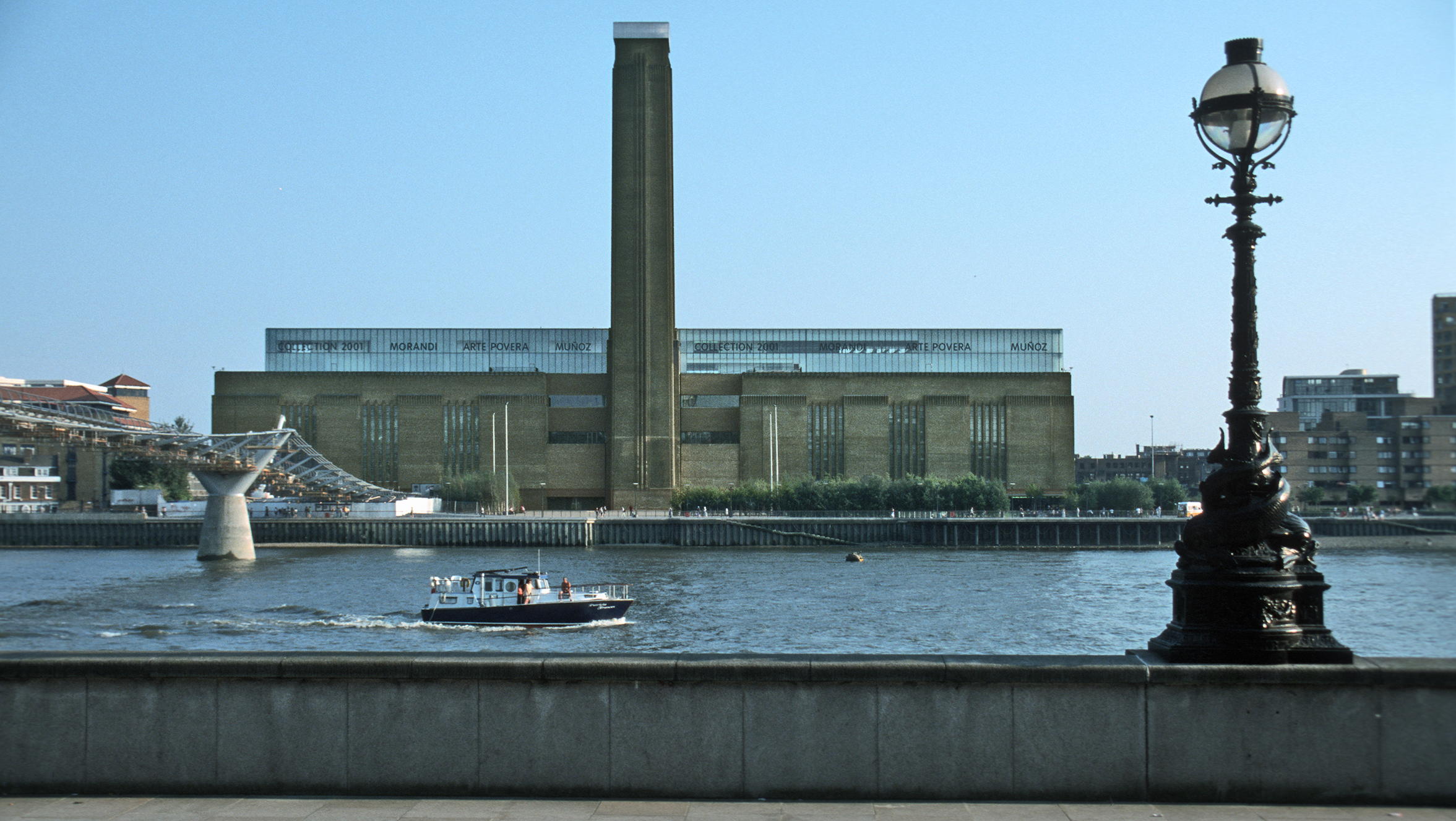
Millennium Bridge with the Tate Modern in the background, both by Tony Fitzpatrick

Born on 9 June 1951, in London, he graduated from Leeds University in 1972 with a first class degree in civil engineering, having won the Holst Prize. He worked for Arup in the UK and in Iran, before joining the design team for the new British Library at St Pancras Station in 1978.

In 1982, he relocated to Hong Kong where he worked on the Hong Kong Bank headquarters, the Shanghai Hilton and Century Tower in Tokyo.

In 1987, when he returned to London, he was made a director of Arup. He later became a board member of the global Partnership and chairman of the Building Engineering Board.

In 2001, he became chairman of Arup’s Americas Division.

While in London, he worked on the designs for the new Tate Modern and 30 St Mary Axe in London as well as the *Shard of Glass, London Bridge, London

Fitzpatrick took over the Millennium Bridge design following its opening when it was found that it wobbled. He designed the measures to correct the wobble, including tuned mass dampers and viscous dampers.

In 2003, while working on the design for Heathrow's Terminal 5, Tony Fitzpatrick was killed in a road accident when his bicycle flipped, throwing him under a passing truck.

== Unfinished projects ==
A number of Tony Fitzpatrick's design have not yet been built. They include:

- Tour Sans Fins, La Défense
