= John Fitzpatrick (Irish footballer) =

Irish footballer

John Fitzpatrick was an Irish soccer player during the 1890s.

He played for the amateur Bohemians and the Ireland team during these times. He captained the Ireland team that played England in the 1895–96 British Home Championship. In doing so, he became Bohs' first ever international player. He also played a part in Bohemians' 6 Leinster Senior Cup final victories in a row during the 1890s.

== Honours ==
- Leinster Senior Cup
  - Bohemians
