= Gary Fitzpatrick (Australian footballer) =

Australian rules footballer

Personal information
- Full name: Gary J. Fitzpatrick
- Born: 31 March 1955 (age 71)
- Original team: Moonee Ponds
- Height: 177 cm (5 ft 10 in)
- Weight: 70 kg (154 lb)
- Position: Rover

Playing career^{1}
Years	Club	Games (Goals)
1974–75	Essendon	13 (10)
- ^{1} Playing statistics correct to the end of 1975.

Gary Fitzpatrick (born 31 March 1955) is a former Australian rules footballer who played with Essendon in the Victorian Football League (VFL). Recruited from Moonee Ponds in the Essendon District Football League, Fitzpatrick left Essendon in 1976 to play with Brunswick in the Victorian Football Association (VFA). After a single season there, he moved to Queensland and played with Mayne and Banyo, the latter of which he captain-coached.
