= Catherine Fitzpatrick (choir director) =

Choir director at St Mary's Cathedral Sydney

- Born: Catherine Milling; 1785
- Died: 1861 (aged 75–76)
- Occupation: choir director
- Known for: first conductor, St. Mary's Cathedral Choir, Sydney, Australia

Catherine Fitzpatrick (1785–1861), née Milling, was the founder and first conductor of St. Mary's Cathedral Choir, in Sydney, Australia.

== Early life and marriage ==
Catherine Milling was born in Dublin, Ireland, in 1785, the daughter of John and Catherine Milling. She married Barnaby (Barney) Fitzpatrick, in Dublin in 1806. He was later convicted of embezzling and sentenced to life, and sent to a penal colony in Australia to serve his sentence. Catherine Fitzpatrick voluntarily joined him in emigrating to Australia. The couple had two children at the time, John, born 1808, and Columbus, born 1810. The family of four sailed together on the ship Providence, arriving in New South Wales on 2 July 1811. The couple had two more boys: Ambrose, born 1814, and Michael, born 1817. Living for a time in Windsor and Paramatta, the family settled in Sydney in 1817.

In 1820, Barnaby Fitzpatrick became the jail constable in Sydney. He later became chief bailiff for the Supreme Court of New South Wales. Catherine was a school teacher.

== St. Mary's Cathedral Choir ==
Catherine Fitzpatrick was a devout Catholic. She was supportive of Father Jeremiah Francis O'Flynn, an Irish Catholic priest who came in 1817 to New South Wales from Dublin, Ireland, to minister to Catholic convicts. O'Flynn had arrived without the approval of the Colonial Office, and worked clandestinely as a priest, baptizing children and celebrating Mass secretly. In May 1818, O'Flynn was deported by Governor Macquarie. In anticipation of the day when priests would be allowed to lead services, Catherine Fitzpatrick began training a group of men and women to sing as a choir for vespers and masses.

In May 1820, two Roman Catholic priests, Father Philip Conolly and Father John Joseph Therry, arrived in New South Wales with permission to minister to the Catholic community. In 1821, funds were raised to establish a Roman Catholic church in Sydney. Governor Macquarie laid the cornerstone of St. Mary's Cathedral on 29 October 1821. Columbus Fitzpatrick was an assistant to Father Therry, and held the trowel for the Governor at the ceremony.

Catherine Fitzpatrick's trained singers became choristers for the cathedral, and she became the first conductor of the St. Mary's Cathedral Choir. Known as "the oldest musical ensemble in Australia still in operation," the choir celebrated its 200th anniversary in 2018.

== Death ==
Fitzpatrick died in Sydney on 31 July 1861.
