= David Fitzpatrick =

David Fitzpatrick is the name of:

- David Fitzpatrick (footballer, born 1990), English footballer
- David Fitzpatrick (footballer, born 1995), English footballer
- David P. B. Fitzpatrick (1948–2019), Irish historian
- David Fitzpatrick, a man who had a fugue state episode (a type of amnesia) in 2005 in the United Kingdom
