= Ron Fitzpatrick =

Australian rules footballer

Personal information
- Full name: Ron Fitzpatrick
- Born: 27 May 1940 (age 86)
- Original team: Coburg
- Height: 177 cm (5 ft 10 in)
- Weight: 73 kg (161 lb)

Playing career^{1}
Years	Club	Games (Goals)
1962	North Melbourne	1 (0)
- ^{1} Playing statistics correct to the end of 1962.

Ron Fitzpatrick (born 27 May 1940) is a former Australian rules footballer who played with North Melbourne in the Victorian Football League (VFL).
