= Jack Fitzpatrick (cricketer) =

Australian cricketer

Personal information
- Born: 18 December 1911; Bankstown, Australia
- Died: 23 January 1999 (aged 87); Bankstown, Australia
- Source: ESPNcricinfo, 28 December 2016

Jack Fitzpatrick (18 December 1911 – 23 January 1999) was an Australian cricketer. He played five first-class matches for New South Wales between 1937/38 and 1938/39.

== See also ==
- List of New South Wales representative cricketers
