= Richard Fitzpatrick (cinematographer) =

Australian cinematographer (born 1970)

- Born: 6 September 1970 (age 55)

Richard John Fitzpatrick (born 6 September 1970) is an Australian Emmy award winning cinematographer and adjunct research fellow specialising in marine biology at James Cook University.

== Early life ==
Richard Fitzpatrick's fascination for sharks started at an early age. Richard caught his first Epaulette shark from the Coral Sea and took it home to keep in his aquarium when he was eleven years old. He then took the entire aquarium into school for show and tell.

== Career ==
Fitzpatrick has filmed for clients such as the BBC, National Geographic and Discovery Channel and has been both the skill behind the camera as well as the subject of numerous underwater documentaries. Known for his unique pioneering techniques for catching sharks by the tail, one of Fitzpatrick's inventions - the shark claw - was profiled on the ABC's show New Inventors.

In 2014, Fitzpatrick was accredited by the Australian Cinematographers Society and also instigated the world's first underwater Google+ hangout.

== Filmography ==
Year	Production	Production company
2018	Great Barrier Reef 3D IMAX Film	December Media/Macgillivray Freeman Films/Slattery Family Trust
2018	Iolo: Deifio yn y Barrier Reef	A4C/BBC
2017	Can We Save The Reef	ABC - Catalyst
2017	Boss Croc	Nat Geo Wild
2015	David Attenborough's Great Barrier Reef	Atlantic Productions
2015	Unnatural Selection	Sly Vision/Terra Mater
2015	Shark	BBC
2015	Sesame Street	Carbon Media/PBS
2014	Operation Manhunter-Great White	Windfall/PBS
2013	Shark 360	
2012	Great Barrier Reef	Digital Dimensions/BBC/Discovery
2010	Strike Force	Digital Dimensions/Natural Geographic/Natural History NZ
2009	Dangerous Encounters with Brady Barr - The Wild West	HDTV/DOP
2009	Dangerous Encounters with Brady Barr - Cannibal Squid	HDTV/DOP
2009	Killer Squid	National Geographic Television
2009	Reptiles Revealed	National Geographic Television
2009	Speed Kills	National Geographic Television
2009	Barney's Great Barrier Reef	Digital Dimensions/BBC Children's
2009	Dangerous Continents	National Geographic Television
2008	Oceans	Galitee Films
2008	Deadly Dozen Series 3 Australia	National Geographic HDTV - DOP
2008	Mysteries of the Shark Coast	Digital Dimensions/Discovery
2007	Worlds Worst Venoms	Digital Dimensions/Parthenon/National Geographic
2007	Natural Wonders	Impossible Pictures
2007	Life in Cold Blood	BBC HD Shoot
2006	Dangerous World	HDTV Beyond Productions/ National Geographic
2006	Miracle Planet	National Geographic
2006	Deadly Dozen - Australia	National Geographic
2006	Worlds Worst Venom's	Digital Dimensions/Parthenon Entertainment
2006	Are We Changing Planet Earth	BBC
2006	Amazing Planet	National Geographic
2006	Animals in Love	MC4 French Feature Film
2006	Shark Bay	TBS Japan
2004	Killer Jellyfish	Digital Dimensions/Discovery Channel/Granada HD doco
2004	Up Close and Dangerous	Discovery/Natural History NZ
2004	Marine protection of the Philippines	WWF Geneva
2004	Microcean	Nature Productions (France)
2004	60 Minutes	Grab a tiger by the tail
2003	The Most Extreme	Discovery Animal Planet
2003	Snake Wranglers – Sea snakes	National Geographic
2003	State of the Reef	WWF Geneva
2003	Nature's Warzone	National Geographic/Digital Dimensions/Natural History NZ
2002	Mystery of the Minke	National Geographic/Natural History Limited – New Zealand
2002	Shark Battlefield	BBC
2002	Don't go there - Box Jellyfish sequences	BBC
2002	Australasia	BBC Natural History Unit
2002	A Man among Sharks	Tele Images (France)
2002	Dangerous Amazon with Jules Sylvester	Discovery Channel/Granada
2002	Dangerous Australians with Jules Sylvester	Discovery Channel/Granada
2001	Wild Nights	Tele-images (France)
2001	World Heritage	TBS (Japan)
2001	Octopus and Squid of Australia	NHK (Japan)
2000	Poison Survival Anglia – Box Jellyfish sequences	
2000	Menacing Waters	Discovery/Natural History Limited
2000	Venom	BBC
1999	Ocean Empires	
1999	Too close for comfort - Sharks feeding	BBC Natural History Unit
1999	Australia's Marine World - cone shells, sharks, turtles	Discovery Channel
1999	Nine network Australia - A Current Affair	Great Barrier Reef Story
1999	Serpents of the sea	Natural History Limited/Discovery Channel
1998	Danger in the Sea - 13 part series	Marquee films Canada
1998	Animal Weapons	Wild Visuals
1998	Tomorrow's world - story of electronic Shark Pod repellent	BBC
1997	Mystic of the Pearl	Film Australia
1997	Das La Nature Canal and France	Documentary on sharks
1995	Beyond the Blue	Coral Sea Television
1994	Dangerous Australians	Channel 9 Australia
1993	Totally Wild	Channel 10 Australia
1993	Wonderworld	Channel 9 Australia

== Awards and nominations ==
Australian Cinematographers Society

- 2017 ACS Golden Tripod Award for Great Barrier Reef Series with David Attenborough

2014 ACS Accreditation

- 2007 Distinction Award for Cinematography 'Reef of Riches' Discovery Channel/NHNZ/NHK
- 2005 Distinction Award for 'Micro Oceans'

Australian Cinematographers Society QLD

- 2016 Gold Award - Wildlife and Nature - Great Barrier Reef Series with David Attenborough
- 2012 Gold Award - Wildlife and Nature - Great Barrier Reef Series Episode 1
- 2012 Silver Award - Wildlife and Nature - Great Barrier Reef Series Episode 3
- 2006 Gold Award – Natural History for 'Equator' Discovery Channel/NHNZ/NHK
- 2005 Silver Award – Natural History for 'Killer Jellyfish' Discovery Channel
- 2004 Gold Award for 'Micro Oceans'
- 2003 Silver Award for 'Raine Island - Nature's Warzone
- 2002 Gold Award – Natural History
- 2001 Highly Commended – Natural History

Academy of Television Arts and Sciences

- 2011 Emmy Award, Cinematography for 'Great Migrations'
- 2007 Emmy nomination, Cinematography for 'Reef of Riches'

International Wildlife Film Festival

- 2008 Merit Award – Macro Cinematography for Animal behaviour 'Equator – Reef of Riches' Discovery Channel
- 2006 Best Photography - 'Equator'
- 2000 Merit Award for Visual Effects - Best Underwater Photography – 'Ocean Empires'

International Wildlife Film Festival (Montana)

- 2003 Honorable Mention 'Mystery of the Minkes' - Underwater Photography

Tropical NQ Media Awards

- 2003 Best Documentary 'Shark Tracker'

Festival International du Film

- 2003 Grand Prix du Public - Aventure & Decouverte for 'Shark Tracker', + Special Jury Prize

Festival Mondial de l'Images Sous-Marine, Antibes

- 2002 First prize – Grand Format Films for 'Shark Battlefields' (BBC)

Antibes Underwater Film Festival

- 2000 Bronze Award - Grand Format Films ' Ocean Empires'

== Books ==
- 2016 Shark Tracker: Confessions of an Underwater Cameraman

== Publications ==
- Little M, Fitzpatrick R, Seymour J (2016) Successful use of heat as first aid for tropical jellyfish stings. Toxicon 122 (2016) 142-144
- Hammerschlag N, Bell I, Fitzpatrick R, Gallagher AJ, Hawkes LA, Meekan MG, Stevens JD, Thums M, Witt MJ, Barnett A (2016) Behavioural evidence suggests facultative scavenging by a marine apex predator during a food pulse. Behavioral Ecology and Sociobiology DOI 10.1007/s00265-016-2183-2
- Barnett A, Payne, N, Semmens J, Fitzpatrick R (2016) Ecotourism increases the field metabolic rate of whitetip reef sharks. Biological Conservation. Volume 199, July 2016, Pages 132-136
- Payne N, Snelling E, Fitzpatrick R, Seymour J, Courtney R, Barnett A, Watanabe Y, Sims D, Squire L & Semmens J (2015) A new method for resolving uncertainty of energy requirements in large water breathers: the ‘mega-flume’ seagoing swim-tunnel respirometer. Methods in Ecology and Evolution. Doi:10.11111/20410210S.12358
- Fitzpatrick R, Thums M, Bell I, Meekan MG, Stevens JD, et al. (2012) A Comparison of the Seasonal Movements of Tiger Sharks and Green Turtles Provides Insight into Their Predator-Prey Relationship. PLoS ONE 7(12): e51927. doi:10.1371/journal.pone.0051927
- Lindsay, D.J., Yoshida, H., Uemura, K., Yamamoto, H., Ishibashi, S., Nishikawa, J., Reimer, J.D., Fitzpatrick, R., Fujikura, K. and T. Maruyama. The untethered remotely-operated vehicle PICASSO-1 and its deployment from chartered dive vessels for deep sea surveys off Okinawa, Japan, and Osprey Reef, Coral Sea, Australia. Marine Technology Society Journal 46(4): 20–32.
- Barnett A, Abrantes KG, Seymour J, Fitzpatrick R (2012) Residency and Spatial Use by Reef Sharks of an Isolated Seamount and Its Implications for Conservation. PLoS ONE 7(5): e36574. doi:10.1371/journal.pone.0036574
- Fitzpatrick R, Abrantes K, Seymour J & Barnett A (2011) Variation in depth of whitetip reef sharks: does provisioning ecotourism change their behaviour. Coral Reefs Vol 30:569-577
- Nishikawa J, Fitzpatrick R, Reimer J, Beaman R, Yamamoto H, Lindsay D (2011) In situ observation of Denise's pygmy seahorse Hippocampus denise associated with a gorgonian coral Annella reticulata at Osprey Reef, Australia. Galaxea 13:25-26
- Heupel MR, Simpfendorfer CA, Fitzpatrick R (2010) Large–Scale Movement and Reef Fidelity of Grey Reef Sharks. PLoS ONE 5(3): e9650. doi:10.1371/ journal.pone.0009650
- Bell I, Seymour J, Fitzpatrick R & Hogarth J (2009) Inter-nesting Dive and Surface Behaviour of Green Turtles, Chelonia mydas, at Raine Island, Northern Great Barrier Reef. Marine Turtles Newsletter 125;5-7 seaturtle.org
- Konow N, Fitzpatrick R & Barnett A. (2006) Adult Emperor angelfish (Pomacanthus imperator) clean giant sunfishes (Mola mola) at Nusa Lembongan, Indonesia. Coral Reefs
- Fitzpatrick (1994) Reef Understanding – Marine Biology Manual. Great Barrier Reef Marine Park Authority
