= Catherine A. Fitzpatrick =

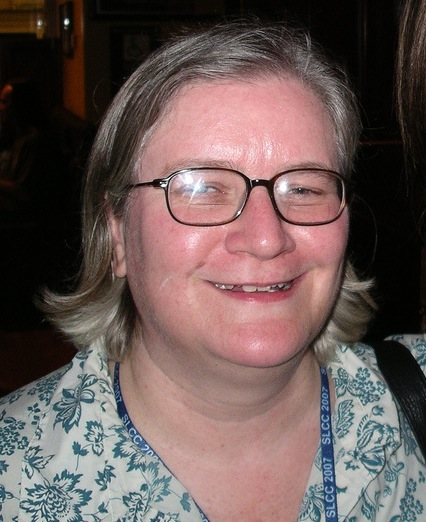
- Other name: Prokofy Neva
- Known for: Russian translator, former human rights and anti-communist activist, blogging on Second Life, criticisms of Woodbury University
- Website: 3dblogger.typepad.com/wired_state/

Catherine Ann Fitzpatrick, also known under her pen name and virtual worlds pseudonym "Prokofy Neva", is a former human rights activist, Russian–English translator, former journalist, and a blogger and commentator. She has worked for several human rights NGOs, and is a former research director at Human Rights Watch, the former editor of Radio Free Europe/Radio Liberty's radio magazine "(Un)Civil Societies," and the former Executive Director and Chief Representative to the United Nations of the International League for Human Rights. She has written on psychiatric abuse in the Soviet Union. She has translated 30 Russian books by authors such as Joseph Stalin, Boris Yeltsin, Vladimir Putin, and several USSR Politburo members.

== Education ==
She studied Slavic studies at St. Michael's College, University of Toronto from 1974 to 1978, and area studies at Leningrad State University from 1978 to 1979.

== Professional career ==
She has worked for Radio Free Europe/Radio Liberty, where she was the editor of the weekly radio magazine "(Un)Civil Societies" from 2003 She has been the Executive Director of the International League for Human Rights, the program director for the former Soviet countries, as well as the UN representative of the International League for Human Rights.

She was research director for Helsinki Watch/Human Rights Watch' European and Central Asian Division from 1981 to 1990. She was a member of the advisory board of Civil Society International.

Fitzpatrick is currently a blogger and translator specializing in human rights issues in the former Soviet Union.

== Involvement in Second Life ==
Catherine Fitzpatrick has also been involved with virtual worlds for several years. She was a resident of the city of Alphaville in The Sims Online, under the avatar name "Dyerbrook". Since 2004, she has been a controversial resident of Second Life, under the avatar name "Prokofy Neva". Her endeavours in Second Life have been mentioned in The New York Times and Wired.

== Criticism of Mitt Romney's digital campaign team ==
Following President Barack Obama's reelection in November 2012, Fitzpatrick penned an entry on her own blog in which she alleged that Republican challenger Mitt Romney's campaign's "ORCA" digital operation had failed because Targeted Victory, the company responsible for much of its online and digital strategy had employed African-American developers who she alleged to have favored the Obama campaign and whose politics was deliberately reflected as bugs left in their work—a hypothesis she based in part on the fact that the developers belonged to ethnic minorities statistically more likely to support Obama, and that one of them had previously been a developer for Al Gore. She later updated her blog to note that the developers in question had not worked on the ORCA project, but on other digital media-related areas of the campaign. Fitzpatrick is a registered member of the Democratic Party.

== Selected publications ==
- Catherine A. Fitzpatrick, Moscow's independent peace movement, U.S. Helsinki Watch Committee, 1982
- Mary Jane Camejo & Catherine A. Fitzpatrick, Violations of the Helsinki accords, Yugoslavia, Helsinki Watch report, Human Rights Watch, 1986, ISBN 0-938579-77-0, ISBN 978-0-938579-77-9
- Ludmila Alekseeva & Catherine A. Fitzpatrick, Nyeformaly: Civil society in the USSR, Helsinki Watch report, 1990, ISBN 0-929692-42-X, ISBN 978-0-929692-42-5
- Catherine A. Fitzpatrick, USSR: human rights under glasnost, Human Rights Watch, 1989
- Catherine A. Fitzpatrick, Psychiatric Abuse in the Soviet Union, Human Rights Watch, 1990, ISBN 1-56432-006-5, ISBN 978-1-56432-006-3

=== Selected translations ===
- Tatiana Mamonova (ed.), Women and Russia : feminist writings from the Soviet Union, Beacon Press, 1984, trans. by Rebecca Park and Catherine A. Fitzpatrick, ISBN 0-8070-6709-1, ISBN 978-0-8070-6709-3
- Leo Timofeyev, Russia's Secret Rulers, Alfred A. Knopf, 1992, trans. by Catherine A. Fitzpatrick
- Alexander Yakovlev, translated by Catherine A. Fitzpatrick, The Fate of Marxism in Russia, Yale University Press (1993), hardcover, ISBN 0-300-05365-7; trade paperback, Lightning Source, UK, Ltd. (17 November 2004) ISBN 0-300-10540-1
- Yevgenia Albats, The State Within a State: The KGB and Its Hold on Russia—Past, Present, and Future, Farrar, Straus, Giroux, 1994, trans. by Catherine A. Fitzpatrick
- Boris Yeltsin, The Struggle for Russia, Random House, 1994, trans. by Catherine A. Fitzpatrick
- Michael Scammell (ed.), The Solzhenitsyn Files, IL Edition Q, 1995, trans. by Catherine A. Fitzpatrick
- Vladimir Solovyov and Elena Klepikova, Zhirinovsky: The Paradoxes of Russian Fascism, London : Viking, 1995, ISBN 0201409488
- Yegor Ligachev, Inside Gorbachev's Kremlin: The Memoirs of Yegor Ligachev, trans. Catherine A. Fitzpatrick, Michele A. Berdy, Dobrochna Dyrcz-Freeman, and Marian Schwartz (Boulder, CO: Westview Press, 1996)
- The unknown Lenin, Yale University Press, 1996, trans. by Catherine A. Fitzpatrick, ISBN 0-300-06919-7, ISBN 978-0-300-06919-8
- First person: an astonishingly frank self-portrait by Russia's president, PublicAffairs, 2000, trans. by Catherine A. Fitzpatrick, ISBN 1-58648-018-9, ISBN 978-1-58648-018-9

== See also ==
- Struggle against political abuse of psychiatry in the Soviet Union
