= Fitzpatrick =

Fitzpatrick may refer to:

- Fitzpatrick (surname)

== Cases & trials ==
- Browne–Fitzpatrick privilege case, 1955, an Australian legal case
- Fitzpatrick v Kelly, an 1873 English Queen's Bench decision
- Fitzpatrick v. Bitzer, a 1976 United States Supreme Court decision
- Fitzpatrick v British Railways Board, a 1992 UK labour law case
- Fitzpatrick v Sterling Housing Association Ltd, a 1999 UK case in the House of Lords

== Entertainment ==
=== Works ===
- Fitzpatrick's War, a 2004 novel by Theodore Judson
- The Fitzpatricks, a 1977 American TV series

=== Fictional characters ===
- Carol Fitzpatrick, a character on the American TV series The West Wing
- Liam Fitzpatrick (Veronica Mars), a character in the American TV series Veronica Mars
- Loren Fitzpatrick, a character in the 2010 season to the New Zealand soap opera Shortland Street
- Maddie Fitzpatrick, a character in the American TV sitcom The Suite Life of Zack & Cody
- Patrick Fitzpatrick III, a character in the novel series The Saga of Seven Suns by Kevin J. Anderson
- Fitzpatrick "Trick" McCorrigan, a character in the Canadian TV series Lost Girl
- Richard Fitzpatrick, a character in the Canadian TV series Call Me Fitz

== Places ==
- Fitzpatrick, Alabama, an unincorporated community in Bullock County
- Fitzpatrick, Georgia, an unincorporated community in Twiggs County
- Fitzpatrick, Quebec, a village served by the Fitzpatrick station in Quebec, Canada
- Fitzpatrick, West Virginia, an unincorporated community in Raleigh County
- Fitzpatrick Center, a research facility at Duke University, Durham, North Carolina, US
- Fitzpatrick Building, an 1890 commercial building in Saint Paul, Minnesota, US
- Fitzpatrick Hotel, an 1898 historic hotel in Washington, Georgia, US
- Fitzpatrick House (disambiguation), several historic places in the United States
- Fitzpatrick Rock, part of the Windmill Islands, Antarctica
- Fitzpatrick Stadium, an outdoor stadium in Portland, Maine, US
- Fitzpatrick Wilderness, a protected area in Shoshone National Forest, Wyoming, US
- Mount Fitzpatrick, the highest peak in the Salt River Range, Wyoming, US

== Other ==
- Fitzpatrick Lecture, an annual lecture given at the British Royal College of Physicians
- Fitzpatrick scale, a numerical classification schema for human skin color
- Mr Fitzpatrick's, a temperance bar in Lancashire, England

== See also ==
- James A. FitzPatrick Nuclear Power Plant, a power plant near Oswego, New York, US
- Percy FitzPatrick Institute of African Ornithology, a research center in Cape Town, South Africa
- Phillips Ormonde Fitzpatrick, an Australian intellectual property firm
