= Coachella Festival line-ups =

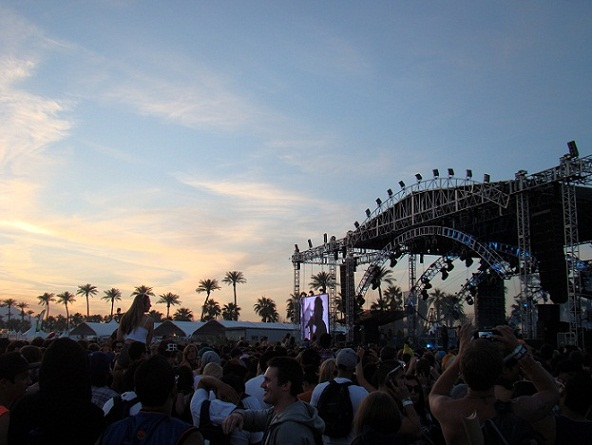
The Weeknd performing at Coachella 2012

Coachella is a music festival organized by the Los Angeles-based concert promoter Goldenvoice (a subsidiary of AEG Live). It takes place annually at the Empire Polo Club in Indio, California. The event is known for its large art pieces and cutting-edge artists' performances.

== Line-ups ==
All information taken from various sources. Headline performers are listed in Boldface. (W1) and (W2) indicate the artist only played Weekend 1 or Weekend 2 respectively on that stage.

=== 1999 ===
Saturday, October 9

Main Stage	Outdoor Theatre	Mojave Tent	Sahara Tent	Gobi Tent
**Beck**; Henry Strand (Monologue); The Chemical Brothers; The Freemen; Morrissey; Perry Farrell; Medeski Martin & Wood; Bis; A Perfect Circle	Underworld; Spiritualized; Life On Repeat; Art of Noise; Modest Mouse; Super Furry Animals; IQU; The Bicycle Thief; At the Drive In	DJ Rap; DJ Softy; Jurassic 5; Breakbeat Era with Roni Size, DJ Die, MC Dynamite; Cornelius; Simply Jeff; The Wiseguys; Christopher Lawrence	Bassbin Twins (Live); Richie Hawtin; Juan Atkins; Derrick May; Kevin Saunderson; Lunatic Calm	DJ Food; Kid Koala; Amon Tobin; Mr. Scruff; μ-Ziq; Nightmares on Wax (DJ Ease); Ming (DJ) & FS; Tomas (Umoja HiFi); Mike Fix

Sunday, October 10

Main Stage	Outdoor Theatre	Mojave Tent	Sahara Tent	Gobi Tent
**Tool**; **Rage Against the Machine**; Ben Harper; Pavement; Cibo Matto; Money Mark	Moby; Esthero; Innerzone Orchestra; DJ Shadow; Spearhead; Rahzel (of The Roots); Gil Scott-Heron; Ugly Duckling	GusGus; Thievery Corporation (Live); Lamb; Fantastic Plastic Machine; Banco de Gaia; BT (DJ set); The Angel a.k.a. 60 Channels	Progression Sessions (LTJ Bukem, Blame, MC Question Mark); Scratch Perverts; Mix Master Mike; Qbert; A-Trak; 4hero; DJ Cam; Science Sessions (Raymond Roker, Jun, MC Conrad)	Luke Vibert; Autechre (DJ Set); Bola; Rob Hall; Jega (Live); Neotropic; Push Button Objects; Mira Calix; Andy Maddocks

DJs playing between every Main Stage act: DJ Liquid Todd, DJ Raymond Roker, DJ Kid Koala, Bud Brothers, DJ Carbo, DJ Jason Bentley, DJ Jun

=== 2001 ===
Saturday, April 28

Coachella Stage	Outdoor Theatre	Mojave Tent	Insomniac Tent	Sahara Tent
**Jane's Addiction**; Paul Oakenfold; Weezer; The Roots; MC Supernatural; Iggy Pop; The Dandy Warhols; Souls of Mischief; Medusa	Gang Starr; MC Supernatural; Roni Size Reprazent; Mos Def; St. Germain; Blonde Redhead; Ozomatli; Nikka Costa; The New Deal; Pedro the Lion	The Orb; Tricky; Sigur Rós; Bad Company UK With MC Tommy D and MC Question Mark; Raymond Roker With MC Tommy D and MC Question Mark; Squarepusher; Plaid; Del the Funky Homosapien; Aceyalone; Planet of the Drums (AK1200, DJ Dara, Dieselboy)	The Chemical Brothers (DJ Set); Fatboy Slim; Doc Martin; Christopher Lawrence; Überzone; Ian Pooley; Adam Freeland; Jason Blakemore; Swedish Egil	Kruder & Dorfmeister; Jason Bentley; Photek; Andrea Parker; Smith & Mighty; Detroit Grand Pubahs; MC Supernatural; Z-Trip; Rinse & Flux

Nortec Collective also played that year

Art from 2001 was contributed by Joe Mangrum.

=== 2002 ===
==== Saturday, April 27 ====
Coachella Stage	Outdoor Theatre	Mojave Tent	Sahara Tent
The Chemical Brothers; **Björk**; Siouxsie & the Banshees; Jack Johnson; Pete Yorn; G. Love & Special Sauce; KRS-One; Princess Superstar; Vin Rock (of Naughty by Nature)	Cake; Jurassic 5; The Beta Band; Queens of the Stone Age; The Charlatans (UK); Cornershop; Folk Implosion; Citizen Cope; Saul Williams	The (International) Noise Conspiracy; The Vines; Z-Trip; Dan the Automator; Kosheen; The Pharcyde; Forest for the Trees; Cirrus; Liquid Todd	Sasha & Digweed; Jimmy Van M & Lee Burridge (2); Groove Armada (DJ set); Miguel Migs w/ Lisa Shaw; Jimmy Van M & Lee Burridge; DJ Mauricio Aviles

==== Sunday, April 28 ====
Coachella Stage	Outdoor Theatre	Mojave Tent	Sahara Tent
**Oasis**; The Prodigy; Foo Fighters; The Strokes; Mos Def Black Jack Johnson; Saves the Day; Mix Master Mike; Vin Rock (of Naughty by Nature)	Dilated Peoples; Zero 7; Belle & Sebastian; Ozomatli; Blonde Redhead; Sound Tribe Sector 9; Ping Pong Bitches	Galactic; Triple Threat; Herbert; Cut Chemist; Rock Steady Crew; The Mars Volta; Elbow; Fairview; Wagner	BT (DJ Set); Pete Tong; Tiësto; Paul Oakenfold; DJ Peretz; DJ Dan; Bad Boy Bill; Sandra Collins; Liquid Todd

Tenacious D performed a surprise guest set before Foo Fighters and Beck performed a surprise guest set after Z-Trip.

=== 2003 ===
==== Saturday, April 26 ====
Coachella Stage	Outdoor Theatre	Sahara Tent	Mojave Tent	Gobi Tent
**Beastie Boys**; Ben Harper & the Innocent Criminals; Queens of the Stone Age; Blur; The Hives; N.E.R.D w/ Spymob; The Donnas; The Mooney Suzuki	Gomez; Blue Man Group; Black Eyed Peas; Talib Kweli; Michael Franti; Kinky; Ben Kweller; Joseph Arthur; Particle	Roger Sanchez; Masters at Work; Marques Wyatt; Darren Emerson; Felix da Housecat; Christopher Lawrence; Hernán Cattáneo; D:Fuse	The Libertines; Groove Armada (Live); Ladytron; The Music; Hot Hot Heat; Badly Drawn Boy; The Rapture; Idlewild; South	Amon Tobin; Dillinja & Lemon D; Stereo Total; Peanut Butter Wolf/Madlib/Wildchild; Ian MacKaye (Q & A); Medusa (spoken word); Tha Liks

==== Sunday, April 27 ====
Coachella Stage	Outdoor Theatre	Sahara Tent	Mojave Tent	Gobi Tent
**Red Hot Chili Peppers**; Iggy and the Stooges; The White Stripes; Jack Johnson; Sonic Youth; The Mars Volta; The Polyphonic Spree; The Soundtrack of Our Lives; Whirlwind Heat	Interpol; Blue Man Group; Thievery Corporation; Primal Scream; Café Tacvba; Tortoise; Ben Folds; The Kinison; Eisley	Richie Hawtin; Underworld; Darren Price of Underworld; Deep Dish; Timo Maas; DB; DJ Irene; FC Kahuna	Fischerspooner; G. Love & Special Sauce; Johnny Marr and the Healers; Dirty Vegas; Rooney; 22-20s; The Von Bondies; Ima Robot; S.T.U.N.	El-P/Aesop Rock/RJD2/Mr. Lif/Murs; Mouse on Mars; C-Minus; Ursula Rucker (spoken word); Ian MacKaye (Q & A); Michael Franti (spoken word)

Dropped Acts: Division of Laura Lee

In 2003, Installation Art contributions came from: Cauac-Syd Klinge, Corndog and the Chaplain of Sparceland—Chunks, Nair B & Lovely, Magic Glasses, Facility 3 Artists and Joe Mangrum, Space Cowboys, Madagascar, 1Sky's HypKnowTron, Howard Hollis+Max Miceli, Christian Ristow, Bio-Fuel Bus, Joe Bard & Danya Parkinson, Finley Fryer, Buckethead, Mutaytor, String Theory Arcadian Circle. The art was curated by Philip Blaine.

=== 2004 ===
==== Saturday, May 1 ====
Coachella Stage	Outdoor Theatre	Sahara Tent	Mojave Tent	Gobi Tent
**Radiohead**; Pixies; Sparta; The (International) Noise Conspiracy; Hieroglyphics; Kinky; The Sounds; The Section Quartet	MF Doom; Kool Keith; Living Legends; Eyedea & Abilities; The Rapture; The Desert Sessions; Death Cab for Cutie; ...And You Will Know Us by the Trail of Dead; The Stills; Howie Day; dios	Kraftwerk; Mark Farina; Laurent Garnier; Sander Kleinenberg; Danny Howells; Seb Fontaine; DJ Peretz; DJ Icon	Electric Six; Mindless Self Indulgence; Stereolab; Moving Units; The Black Keys; Junior Senior; stellastarr*; Sahara Hotnights; Erase Errata	Phantom Planet; Da Lata; Boozoo Bajou; LCD Soundsystem; Savath & Savalas; Beck; Q and Not U; The Evens; Juana Molina

==== Sunday, May 2 ====
Coachella Stage	Outdoor Theatre	Sahara Tent	Mojave Tent	Gobi Tent
**The Cure**; The Flaming Lips; Air; Belle & Sebastian; Thursday; Muse; Antibalas Afrobeat Orchestra; Saul Williams; Thelonious Monster	Le Tigre; Basement Jaxx; Black Rebel Motorcycle Club; Bright Eyes; Cursive; Atmosphere; Broken Social Scene; !!!; Pretty Girls Make Graves	Paul van Dyk; Ferry Corsten; Crystal Method; Adam Freeland; 2manyDJs; Donald Glaude; DJ Peretz; Hybrid	Ash; Mogwai; The Sleepy Jackson; Dizzee Rascal; The Cooper Temple Clause; The Thrills; Elefant; Home Town Hero; Whitestarr	Sidestepper; Danger Mouse; Prefuse 73; T. Raumschmiere (cancelled); Sage Francis; The Killers; Saul Williams; The Section Quartet; Supernatural

Dropped Acts: The Future Sound of London, Jimmy Eat World, and Wilco

The 2004 Installation Artists were: Syd Klinge (Cauac Tesla Coil), Nairb (Deus Ex Machina), Laura Crosta and Funn Roberts (Lanternaria), LT Mustardseed (The Journey of the Dragonfly), Finley Fryer ("Stan" – The Diver), Rosanna Scimecca (Cleavage in Space+Red Widow Spider), Christian Ristow (Robochrist Industries), David Wharton + Scott Mattison (Diffraction Light Tunnel), Howard Hollis (Linticular 3-D Art), Scott Gasparian (gaspo) (HypKnowTron), D-light (Helix IV), Gabi Tuschak, Juli Gudmundson and Melody Byrd (Chitlin'n Grits), Mass Ensemble (Earth Harp), Jerico Woggon (Year of the Snake) and Cyclecide (Bike Rodeo). Philip Blaine curated the art.

=== 2005 ===
==== Saturday, April 30 ====
Coachella Stage	Outdoor Theatre	Sahara	Mojave	Gobi
**Coldplay**; Bauhaus; Weezer; Wilco; Keane; Snow Patrol; The Raveonettes; Buck 65	Spoon; Mercury Rev; Sage Francis; Café Tacvba; Rilo Kiley; Razorlight; Eisley; Jamie Cullum; Nic Armstrong & the Thieves	The Chemical Brothers; Hernán Cattáneo; Josh Wink; U.N.K.L.E. (James Lavelle); Tiga; DJ Marky; DJ Peretz; Evil Nine (cancelled)	Fantômas; Bloc Party; The Secret Machines; MF Doom; Stereophonics; The Kills; Ambulance LTD; Radio 4; Gratitude; The Sexy Magazines	Zap Mama; Amp Fiddler; Four Tet; Swayzak; Jean Grae; Immortal Technique; M83; k-os; Katie Melua; Boom Bip

==== Sunday, May 1 ====
Coachella Stage	Outdoor Theatre	Sahara	Mojave	Gobi
Black Star; **Nine Inch Nails**; New Order; Gang of Four; The Futureheads; Thrice; The Perceptionists; Gram Rabbit	Bright Eyes; The Faint; British Sea Power; Aesop Rock; Arcade Fire; Tegan and Sara; The Fiery Furnaces; Jem; Donavon Frankenreiter; Shout Out Louds	The Prodigy; Roni Size w/ Dynamite MC; Armin van Buuren; Junkie XL; Miss Kittin; Ben Watt; Matthew Dear; Diplo; DJ Jun	The Locust; The Blood Brothers; Pinback; The Dresden Dolls; Roots Manuva; The Bravery; Kasabian; Autolux; Sloan; Midlake; Goodbye Radar	Wolf Eyes; Matmos; DJ Krush; Z-Trip; Beans; M.I.A.; Sixtoo; Subtle; Zion I

The Do LaB: Jupit3r, Todd Spero

Dropped Acts: Cocteau Twins, Doves Installation Art :: Curated by Philip Blaine

=== 2006 ===
==== Saturday, April 29 ====
Coachella Stage	Outdoor Theatre	Sahara	Mojave	Gobi	Oasis Dome
**Depeche Mode**; Franz Ferdinand; Sigur Rós; Kanye West; Common; The Duke Spirit; The Walkmen; The New Amsterdams; The Section Quartet	She Wants Revenge; Atmosphere; Eagles of Death Metal; Damian "Jr. Gong" Marley; My Morning Jacket; Animal Collective; The Zutons; Matt Costa; The Like; Head Automatica	Daft Punk; Audio Bullys; Carl Cox; Derrick Carter; Colette; Joey Beltram; Hybrid featuring Perry Farrell; Infusion	The Rakes; Living Things; Cat Power; Ladytron; TV on the Radio; Clap Your Hands Say Yeah; Wolfmother; Nine Black Alps; White Rose Movement; Rob Dickinson	Tosca; The Juan MacLean; Devendra Banhart; Imogen Heap; Deerhoof; Lyrics Born; Lady Sovereign; Platinum Pied Pipers; Celebration; Brother Ali	Shy FX & T-Power

==== Sunday, April 30 ====
Coachella Stage	Outdoor Theatre	Sahara	Mojave	Gobi	Oasis Dome
**Tool**; Massive Attack; Yeah Yeah Yeahs; Sleater-Kinney; Matisyahu; The Magic Numbers; Los Amigos Invisibles; Youth Group	Scissor Sisters; The Go! Team; Mogwai; Digable Planets; Bloc Party; Minus the Bear; Ted Leo and the Pharmacists; Mates of State; Giant Drag; The Octopus Project	Michael Mayer; Mylo (DJ Set); Madonna; Paul Oakenfold; Kaskade; Louie Vega; Gabriel & Dresden; Kristina Sky	Art Brut; Dungen; Coheed and Cambria; Editors; stellastarr*; Wolf Parade; Metric; James Blunt; The Dears; Be Your Own Pet; OneRepublic	Jazzanova; Gilles Peterson; Coldcut; Seu Jorge; Gnarls Barkley; Jamie Lidell; Phoenix; Amadou & Mariam; Murs featuring 9th Wonder; Infadels	Chris Liberator

Dropped Acts: Hard-Fi and The Subways

The 2006 installation artists were: Syd Klinge (Cauac), Brian Corndog (Metron Transformer), Michael Christian (Flock and Hypha), Rosanna Scimecca (Zephyrus' Disgolmerate), Jerico Woggon, Orion Fredricks (Harmonizer Water Sculpture), Doyle (The Spider), Cyclecide/Bike Rodeo, O2 Creative (Gnome Dome), The Do LaB (Lucent Misting Oasis featuring Lucent Dossier Experience,) and Keith Greco (Leaf Rake Tree+Snow Globe Domes, Hotshot the Robot, Philip Blaine curated.

=== 2007 ===
==== Friday, April 27 ====
Coachella Stage	Outdoor Theatre	Sahara	Mojave	Gobi
**Björk**; Interpol; The Jesus and Mary Chain; Arctic Monkeys; Silversun Pickups; Satellite Party; Brother Ali; Flosstradamus	DJ Shadow; Sonic Youth; Jarvis Cocker; Peaches; Stephen Marley featuring Jr. Gong; Of Montreal; Nickel Creek	Evil Nine; Faithless; Benny Benassi; Felix Da Housecat; Digitalism; David Guetta; Charles Feelgood; Terry Mullan	Gogol Bordello; El-P; Peeping Tom; Rufus Wainwright; Circa Survive; Tilly and the Wall; Tokyo Police Club; Noisettes	Brazilian Girls; Busdriver; Julieta Venegas; Amy Winehouse; Gillian Welch; Comedians of Comedy

Dome: Junglist Platoon/Respect featuring: Machete, Scooba, Clutch, No Face & Drone, Kraak & Smaak, David J, Marques Wyatt, Jacob Thiele (of The Faint), Travis Keller

The Do LaB: Lucent Dossier Experience, Jesse Wright, Sammy Bliss, Helios Jive, DJ Imagika, Nalepa

==== Saturday, April 28 ====
Coachella Stage	Outdoor Theatre	Sahara	Mojave	Gobi
Tiësto; **Red Hot Chili Peppers**; Arcade Fire; Kings of Leon; Travis; Regina Spektor; Fountains of Wayne; Pharoahe Monch	The Good, the Bad & the Queen; Gotan Project; Blonde Redhead; Ghostface Killah; The Decemberists; The New Pornographers; Jack's Mannequin; The Frames	The Rapture; LCD Soundsystem; Justice; Busy P & DJ Mehdi; MSTRKRFT; DJ Heather; Steve Aoki	The Black Keys; Sparklehorse; Ozomatli; !!!; Peter Bjorn and John; Hot Chip; The Fratellis; The Cribs; Fields	Cornelius; Mike Relm; Girl Talk; CocoRosie; Andrew Bird; The Nightwatchman; Roky Erickson; Chuck Dukowski Sextet; Yeva; Pop Levi

Dome: Bassrush featuring: Silver, Hazen, XXXL, Subflo, MC Dino & Question Mark, Lady Miss Kier, Andy Rourke, Daniel Ash, Eugene, Carla and Greg (of Autolux), The Professionals

The Do LaB: Lucent Dossier Experience, Bassnectar, Jupit3r, Dandelion, David Starfire, Metamorphs, Nick the Neck, The Ianator

==== Sunday, April 29 ====
Coachella Stage	Outdoor Theatre	Sahara	Mojave	Gobi
**Rage Against the Machine**; Manu Chao Radio Bemba Sound System; Crowded House; Willie Nelson; The Roots; Explosions in the Sky; The Feeling; Lupe Fiasco; Mika	The Lemonheads; Damien Rice; Air; Placebo; Kaiser Chiefs; Against Me!; The Coup; Mando Diao; Anathallo	Infected Mushroom; Happy Mondays; Paul van Dyk; Richie Hawtin; Soulwax Nite Versions; Trent Cantrelle; DJ Dayhota	VNV Nation; Ratatat; Lily Allen; Klaxons; CSS; Junior Boys; The Kooks; Tapes 'n Tapes; Fair to Midland	Spank Rock; Teddybears; Amos Lee; José González; Konono Nº1; Rodrigo y Gabriela; Grizzly Bear; The Avett Brothers; Kid Beyond

Dome: Adam Freeland, Total Science, Paul Harding (of Pendulum), Cut Chemist, Kevin Haskins, Busy P & DJ Mehdi, Frankie Chan

The Do LaB: Lucent Dossier Experience, Helios Jive, Marty, Jok Ton, The Ianator

Dropped Acts: We Are Scientists

Art for 2007 included: The Do LaB, Lucent Dossier Experience, Johnny America, Syd Klinge: Tesla Coil, Brian Corndog: KA Labyrinth, Mark Lottor: Cubatron, Cyclecide Bike Rodeo, Kinetic Steam Works, Jamie Vaida: Goes Around Comes Around Carousel, Stronghold Productions: FirePod, Michael Christian: I.T., and Babel, Sean Sobczak: Love and Dragons, Domes Guys: 90' Dome, Jason Hackenworth: Megamite Army, Dorothy Trojanowski: Rubber Horses, Perpetual Art Machine, NON Designs, Mark Esper: It's in the Air and Enlightenment, Brose Partington: Tide, Greg de Gouveia: Cubed []3, Jim Bowers: Terrasphere, Hotshot the Robot, LT Mustardseed: Aquatic Temple of Chill, Stefano Corazza: Field of Sunflower Robots, Sasstown Crew (Portland): Threemove, Rosanna Scimeca: St. Taudry's, manIC. Philip Blaine curated.

=== 2008 ===
==== Friday, April 25 ====
Coachella Stage	Outdoor Theatre	Sahara	Mojave	Gobi
**Jack Johnson**; The Verve; The Raconteurs; Tegan and Sara; The Breeders; Slightly Stoopid; John Butler Trio; Rogue Wave	Serj Tankian; The Swell Season; The National; Vampire Weekend; Architecture in Helsinki; Les Savy Fav; Luckyiam	Fatboy Slim; Pendulum; Aphex Twin; Diplo; Sandra Collins; Adam Freeland; Busy P; SebastiAn; Midnight Juggernauts; DJ Mehdi	Black Lips; Sharon Jones & The Dap-Kings; Aesop Rock; Goldfrapp; múm; Jens Lekman; Black Kids; Redd Kross; American Bang	Professor Murder; Spank Rock; Datarock; Santogold; dan le sac vs Scroobius Pip; Cut Copy; Dan Deacon; Battles; Porter

The Do LaB: Lucent Dossier Experience, The Ianator, Sammy Bliss, Jesse Wright, DJ Wolfie, Djun Djun, Henry Strange, Geno Cochino, Chad Rock

==== Saturday, April 26 ====
Coachella Stage	Outdoor Theatre	Sahara	Mojave	Gobi
**Prince**; Portishead; Kraftwerk; Death Cab for Cutie; Café Tacvba; Cold War Kids; Minus the Bear; VHS or Beta	Flogging Molly; Mark Ronson; Rilo Kiley; Dwight Yoakam; Stephen Malkmus and the Jicks; DeVotchKa; dredg; Little Brother; Jupiter's Ring	Above & Beyond; Sasha & John Digweed; M.I.A.; Junkie XL; Hot Chip; Erol Alkan; Boys Noize; James Zabiela; Kavinsky; Uffie featuring DJ Mehdi; Institubes	Enter Shikari; Yelle; Animal Collective; Islands; Scars on Broadway; Kate Nash; MGMT; Man Man; The Teenagers; The Bird and the Bee	Calvin Harris; Akron/Family; Yo! Majesty; The Cinematic Orchestra; St. Vincent; Bonde do Rolê; 120 Days; Carbon/Silicon; Yoav

The Do LaB: Lucent Dossier Experience, The Glitch Mob, Random Rab, David Starfire with iCatching, Jesse (of Brazilian Girls), Dandelion, DJ Imagika, Adam Ohana

==== Sunday, April 27 ====
Coachella Stage	Outdoor Theatre	Sahara	Mojave	Gobi
**Roger Waters**; My Morning Jacket; Sean Penn (spoken word); Gogol Bordello; Stars; Shout Out Louds; The Cool Kids; Austin TV	Love and Rockets; Metric; Autolux; Manchester Orchestra; Electric Touch; Grand Ole Party; Vas Defrans	Justice; Chromeo; Simian Mobile Disco; Modeselektor; Danny Tenaglia; Booka Shade; deadmau5; Dimitri from Paris; Perry Farrell; Institubes	Black Mountain; Murs; Sia; Spiritualized; Swervedriver; Duffy; I'm from Barcelona; Annuals; Plastiscines	Sons and Daughters; Kid Sister with A-Trak; Does It Offend You, Yeah?; The Field (cancelled); Holy F*ck; Sean Penn (spoken word); Linton Kwesi Johnson; Brett Dennen

The Do LaB: Lucent Dossier Experience, Adam Freeland, Jupit3r, Patricio, Oscure, El Papa Chango, Helios Jive, Ana Sia, Saynt

Dropped Acts: Jamie T, Madness, New Young Pony Club, The Bees, The Horrors, The Streets, Turbonegro

Portishead were planned to headline the festival, but were demoted to playing before Prince's set.

In 2008, art was contributed by Gerard Minakawa: (Bamboo Waves), The Do Lab: (Oasis), Sean Orlando: (The Steampunk Treehouse), Mike Ross: (BigRigJig), Mark Lottor: (The Quad Cubatron), Ball-Nogues Studio: (Copper Droopscape), Martii Kalliala and Jenna Sutela: (Super Ball), Aaron Koblin: (Flight Patterns), Michael Christian: (Beyond the Garden), Christopher Janney: (Sonic Forest), Syd Klinge: (Cauac Twins), Corndog: (Parabola), James Nick Sears: (The Orb), Orion Fredericks: (Fata Morgana) HotShot the Robot, SWARM and Slick. Philip Blaine curated.

=== 2009 ===
==== Friday, April 17 ====
Coachella Stage	Outdoor Theatre	Gobi	Mojave	Sahara
**Paul McCartney**; Morrissey; Franz Ferdinand; The Black Keys; The Airborne Toxic Event; We Are Scientists; The Courteeners	Silversun Pickups; Leonard Cohen; Conor Oberst and the Mystic Valley Band; M. Ward; Molotov; Noah and the Whale; Alberta Cross	Bajofondo; A Place to Bury Strangers; Peanut Butter Wolf; The Bug featuring Warrior Queen; Buraka Som Sistema; Los Campesinos!; People Under The Stairs; Ryan Bingham; El Gran Silencio	Genghis Tron; Mike Patton & Rahzel; Beirut; N.A.S.A.; White Lies; The Hold Steady; Cage the Elephant; The Aggrolites; Dear and the Headlights	The Crystal Method; The Presets; Girl Talk; Ghostland Observatory; Crystal Castles; The Ting Tings; Felix da Housecat; Steve Aoki; Gui Boratto; Craze & Klever (cancelled); Switch

The Do LaB: VibeSquaD, Lucent Dossier Experience, The Ianator, Jesse Wright, Kether, DJ Wolfie, Dub Science

The Dome. Ed Banger Records Presents: Free DOME of Speech: Busy P, DJ Mehdi, Kim of The Presets, Peanut Butter Wolf, Steve Aoki, Friendly Fires (DJ Set)

==== Saturday, April 18 ====
Coachella Stage	Outdoor Theatre	Gobi	Mojave	Sahara
**The Killers**; M.I.A. (replaced Amy Winehouse); Thievery Corporation; TV on the Radio; Michael Franti & Spearhead; Paolo Nutini; Joss Stone; Billy Talent	Atmosphere; Jenny Lewis; Band of Horses; Fleet Foxes; Calexico; Superchunk; Drive-By Truckers; Liars; Cloud Cult	Gang Gang Dance; Glass Candy; Junior Boys; Booker T. & the DBT's; Tinariwen; Amanda Palmer; Blitzen Trapper; Bob Mould Band; Ida Maria	Mastodon; Turbonegro; Electric Touch; James Morrison; Glasvegas (cancelled); Henry Rollins; Dr. Dog; thenewno2; Ariel Pink's Haunted Graffiti; P.O.S	MSTRKRFT; The Chemical Brothers (DJ Set); Crookers; TRV$DJAM; The Bloody Beetroots; Zane Lowe; Surkin; Para One (Live); Drop the Lime; Zizek Club

The Do LaB: Lucent Dossier Experience, Sub Swara, Beats Antique, MiM0SA, Patricio, El Papa Chango, Helios Jive, RD, Pod

The Dome. Pure Filth Presents: Soundclash in the Desert: Flying Lotus, Kode9, Daedelus, Bomb Squad, The Professionals & 6 Blocc, Daddy Kev, Nobody & Nocando, The Gaslamp Killer & DLX, Ras G & Samiyam

==== Sunday, April 19 ====
Coachella Stage	Outdoor Theatre	Gobi	Mojave	Sahara
**The Cure**; My Bloody Valentine; Yeah Yeah Yeahs; Peter Bjorn and John; Lupe Fiasco; Okkervil River; The Knux	Roni Size Reprazent; Public Enemy; Paul Weller; Antony and the Johnsons; Lykke Li; The Gaslight Anthem; The Night Marchers; Instituto Mexicano del Sonido	The Orb; Devendra Banhart; Clipse (cancelled); K'naan; Sébastien Tellier; Friendly Fires; Themselves	Throbbing Gristle; The Kills; The Horrors; X; Murder City Devils; The Brian Jonestown Massacre; Fucked Up; No Age; Vivian Girls	Étienne de Crécy; Groove Armada (DJ Set); Christopher Lawrence; Late of the Pier; Plump DJs; Perry Farrell; M.A.N.D.Y.; Busy P; Shepard Fairey; Supermayer; Marshall Barnes

The Do LaB: Lucent Dossier Experience, BLVD, Random Rab, Jupit3r, Marty Party, QUIET, David Starfire w/ iCatching, Imagika, Braden, Henrey Strange

The Dome. 1107 Presents: LA Riots, Felix Cartal, Treasure Island, AC Slater, Joker of the Scene, Jokers of the Scene, Paparazzi, Kill the Noise, Franki Chan

Dropped Acts: Amy Winehouse, Hercules and Love Affair

In 2009, art was contributed by: The Do Lab's Lucent Mysting Oasis and Lucent Dossier Experience, Gerard Minakawa: (Bamboo Starscraper), Flaming Lotus Girls: (Serpent Mother), Rob Bucholz: (Perhaps) Hotshot the Robot: (Spectralcodec Interactive Video), CalPoly Pomona Architectural students+Michael Fox: (Flockwall), Shrine + Spears family: (La Familia Divina – Shrine), False Profits Labs: (Pyrocardium), Michael Christian: (Sphae), Ball-Nogues Studio (Benjamin Ball+Gaston Nogues+Andrew Lyon and Philip Blaine and SCI Arc Students): (Elastic Plastic Sponge), Rimski: (Rimski's Bicycle Piano), Christian Ristow: (Hand of Man), Mark Lottor: (The Quad Cubatron), Alex Nolan and Justin Grant: (SOL), Syd Klinge: (Cauac Twins). Philip Blaine curated.

=== 2010 ===
Thursday, April 15 | 1107 Events Presents: Matinée Sessions in the Camgrounds: Jokers of the Scene, Le Castle Vania, 12th Planet, Toy Selectah, Franki Chan, Matinee Resident All Stars featuring: Paparazzi, Joaquin, Sir Charles

==== Friday, April 16 ====
Coachella Stage	Outdoor Theatre	Gobi	Mojave	Sahara
**Jay-Z**; LCD Soundsystem; Them Crooked Vultures; The Specials; Street Sweeper Social Club; Calle 13; Wale	Public Image Ltd.; Vampire Weekend; Echo and the Bunnymen; Passion Pit; She & Him; The Cribs (cancelled); The Avett Brothers; Deer Tick; Alana Grace	The Whitest Boy Alive; Céu; Little Dragon; La Roux; Gil Scott-Heron; The Dillinger Escape Plan; Hockey; Sleigh Bells; Iglu & Hartly; P.O.S; Kate Miller-Heidke	Fever Ray; Imogen Heap; Grizzly Bear; Lucero; Ra Ra Riot; Yeasayer; As Tall as Lions; Baroness; Jets Overhead	deadmau5; Benny Benassi; Erol Alkan; Pretty Lights; Wolfgang Gartner; Aeroplane; Proxy; Perry Farrell vs. Steve Porter; DJ Lance Rock; Pablo Hassan

The Do LaB: Lucent Dossier Experience, KRADDY, R/D, Jesse Wright, Sammy Bliss, The Ianator, Pod

Heineken Dome: DJ Tre – Special Session: Coachella's first Silent Disco, Andy Caldwell, Classixx, Eskmo, Fred Everything, J-Boogie vs. DJ Eleven, David Arevalo

Coachella & Pure Filth Present: BASSFACE, Camping Sessions: Mary Anne Hobbs, Daedelus, The Gaslamp Killer, Nobody, Sam XL, Ras G & Samiyam, Nocando. Visuals by Dr. Strangeloop

==== Saturday, April 17 ====
Coachella Stage	Outdoor Theatre	Gobi	Mojave	Sahara
Tiësto; **Muse**; Faith No More; Coheed and Cambria; Tokyo Police Club; White Rabbits; Old Crow Medicine Show; Zoé; Steel Train	The Dead Weather; MGMT; Hot Chip; The xx; Edward Sharpe and the Magnetic Zeros; The Temper Trap; Frightened Rabbit (cancelled); Porcupine Tree; Rx Bandits	Sia; Flying Lotus; Bad Lieutenant (cancelled); Corinne Bailey Rae; The Raveonettes; Band of Skulls; Girls; Portugal. The Man; The Almighty Defenders; Frank Turner	Devo; Les Claypool; Major Lazer; Aterciopelados; Dirty Projectors; Gossip; Beach House; Camera Obscura; Shooter Jennings & Hierophant; John Waters	2manyDJs; Die Antwoord; Z-Trip; David Guetta; Kaskade; Bassnectar; Dirty South; Craze & Klever; Jason Bentley; Sam XL

The Do LaB: Beats Antique, Eskmo, Lucent Dossier Experience, Jupit3r, Oscure, LYNX & Janover, Patricio, Deru, The Ianator

Heineken Dome: VJ/DJ Kris P – Special Session: Coachella's first Silent Disco, Milo/Vello, David Carvahlo, David Starfire featuring MC iCatching, Nisus, Franky Boissy, Isaiah Martin featuring Dustin on Brass, Behrouz, Bunny (of Rabbit in the Moon)

Coachella & Pure Filth Present: BASSFACE, Camping Sessions: Seven (filled the spot after Flylo's cancellation), Jakes, The Professionals, Take, Free the Robots, Deco & DLX, MC Kemst Visuals by Dr. Strangeloop

==== Sunday, April 18 ====
Coachella Stage	Outdoor Theatre	Gobi	Mojave	Sahara
**Gorillaz**; Pavement; Spoon; Yo La Tengo; De La Soul; B.o.B; Babasonicos	Thom Yorke; Phoenix; Jónsi; Sunny Day Real Estate; Deerhunter; Owen Pallett; Delphic (cancelled); The Middle East	Little Boots; Sly Stone; Charlotte Gainsbourg; Florence + the Machine; Mayer Hawthorne and the County; Local Natives; Hypnotic Brass Ensemble (cancelled); Kevin Devine	Yann Tiersen; The Big Pink; Gary Numan (cancelled); Miike Snow; Julian Casablancas; Matt & Kim; Mutemath; King Khan and the Shrines; The Soft Pack; One eskimO	Plastikman; Orbital; Infected Mushroom; Club 75: DJ Mehdi, Cassius, Busy P, Xavier de Rosnay; The Glitch Mob; Rusko; Talvin Singh (cancelled); Paparazzi

The Do LaB: Lucent Dossier Experience, MiM0SA, Random Rab, Siren, Welder, Patricio

Heineken Dome: VJ/DJ Kris P – Special Session: Coachella's first Silent Disco, Donald Glaude, Brion Topolski, Jamie Schwabl, Kris P, DJ Frances, Freddy Be, Kazell

Dropped Acts: Grace Jones, Hadouken!, Mew

=== 2011 ===
==== Friday, April 15 ====
Coachella Stage	Outdoor Theatre	Gobi	Mojave	Sahara	Oasis Dome
The Chemical Brothers; **Kings of Leon**; The Black Keys; Interpol; Ms. Lauryn Hill; Cee Lo Green; Ozomatli; Moving Units	Flogging Molly; Caifanes; Crystal Castles; Brandon Flowers; Cold War Kids; Tame Impala; Warpaint; Titus Andronicus; !!!; The Rural Alberta Advantage	Scala & Kolacny Brothers; Nosaj Thing; Monarchy; Marina and the Diamonds; Kele; Ariel Pink's Haunted Graffiti; The Morning Benders; Omar Rodríguez-López; Brandt Brauer Frick; New Pants	Gayngs; Robyn; The Aquabats; Cut Copy; Sleigh Bells; Yacht; The Pains of Being Pure at Heart; The Drums; Cold Cave; Black Joe Lewis & the Honeybears; Hurts; Miguel	Boys Noize; Sasha; Magnetic Man; Erick Morillo; Afrojack; A-Trak; Odd Future Wolf Gang Kill Them All; Skrillex; Excision; 12th Planet; Tokimonsta; Alf Alpha	Jakes; Beardyman; Breakage; Professionals; Mount Kimbie; Kyle Hall; Emicida; Gabe Real; Metaphase

The Do LaB: Lucent Dossier Experience, Freq Nasty, KRADDY, Jupit3r, La' Reda, Govinda, SaQi, RLS, Michele Bass, GoldRush

==== Saturday, April 16 ====
Coachella Stage	Outdoor Theatre	Gobi	Mojave	Sahara	Oasis Dome
**Arcade Fire**; Animal Collective; Mumford & Sons; Bright Eyes; Broken Social Scene; Erykah Badu; Gogol Bordello; Bomba Estéreo; Trampled by Turtles	Empire of the Sun; Big Audio Dynamite; The Kills; The New Pornographers; Cage the Elephant; Delta Spirit; Here We Go Magic; Thao with the Get Down Stay Down; Francis and the Lights; The Love Language	Daedelus; Raphael Saadiq; Wire; Electric Touch; Yelle; Glasser; The Radio Dept.; The Tallest Man on Earth; Cults; The Joy Formidable; EE	Scissor Sisters; Suede; The Swell Season; One Day as a Lion; Elbow; Jenny and Johnny; Two Door Cinema Club; Foals; Freelance Whales; The Henry Clay People; Mariachi El Bronx	Steve Angello; Paul van Dyke; Fedde le Grand; Shpongle presents: The Shpongletron Experience; Laidback Luke; Chuckie; Joachim Garraud; Sander Kleinenberg; Perry Farrell & Etty Lau Farrell vs. Chris Cox; The Twelves; Rye Rye; DJ Heavygrinder	DJ Marky (cancelled); Andy C and GQ; DJ Kentaro; DJ Hype; Mary Anne Hobbs; Lil B; SBTRKT; Goth-Trad; Take; Don Letts; Alf Alpha; Ras G

The Do LaB: An-Ten-Nae, Lucent Dossier Experience, NitGrit, Emancipator, Ana Sia, Patricio, Jesse Wright & Lee Burridge, Sammy Bliss, The Ianator

Jeff Goldblum performed an unannounced jazz set in the campgrounds in the afternoon.

==== Sunday, April 17 ====
Coachella Stage	Outdoor Theatre	Gobi	Mojave	Sahara	Oasis Dome
**Kanye West**; **The Strokes**; Duran Duran; Death from Above 1979; Nas & Damian Marley; Wiz Khalifa; Jack's Mannequin; Los Bunkers (cancelled)	PJ Harvey; Chromeo; The National; Best Coast; Jimmy Eat World; City and Colour; Fun; Menomena; Gord Downie; Good Old War	She Wants Revenge; Neon Trees; Phantogram; Lightning Bolt; Foster the People; Tinie Tempah; Ellie Goulding; Angus & Julia Stone; Off!; Delorean; Plan B; Eliza Doolittle	The Presets; Leftfield; Ratatat; Trentemøller; Fistful of Mercy; Health; CSS; Men; Twin Shadow; Phosphorescent; Ryan Leslie	Axwell; Bloody Beetroots – Death Crew 77; Chase & Status; Duck Sauce; Sven Väth; Jack Beats; Caspa; Green Velvet; Riva Starr; WhiteNoize	Terror Danjah; Zed Bias; Ramadanman; Roska; Kode9; Joy Orbison; High Contrast; DJ Zinc; Thunderball; Tokimonsta; Lorn; Sam XL

The Do LaB: Lucent Dossier Experience, Paper Diamond, R/D, Stephan Jacobs, Sugarpill, Siren, Gladkill, Timonkey, Karim So

Dropped Acts: Clare Maguire, Fat Freddy's Drop, Gypsy & the Cat, Klaxons

In 2011, art was contributed by: The Do Lab Oasis and Lucent Dossier Experience, The Creators Project: Coachella Stage Enhanced, Sarah Tent Installation, Long March, Punch, Nidhogg, The Do Lab, The Do Lab's Pagoda, Winwin Creative: Joy, Michael Christian: Candelaphytes, Hotshot the Robot, Cyclecide Bike Rodeo, reel-Mobile, Coachella Art Studios, Rob Buchholz: Wish, Todd Williams: Land Sharks, Syd Klinge: (CauacTwins), Christian Ristow: Fledgling, Balloon Chain, A Physical Manifestation of Ladies and Gentlemen We Are Floating in Space: Jonathan Glazer + J. Spaceman with Undisclosable and One of Us.

=== 2012 ===
==== Friday, April 13 & 20 ====
Coachella Stage	Outdoor Theatre	Gobi	Mojave	Sahara
Swedish House Mafia; **The Black Keys**; Pulp; Arctic Monkeys; Jimmy Cliff & Tim Armstrong; James; Kendrick Lamar; Hello Seahorse!; GabeReal	Refused; Explosions in the Sky; Mazzy Star; Madness; Girls; Neon Indian; Yuck; The Dear Hunter; The Sheepdogs	The Horrors; The Black Angels; Atari Teenage Riot; Frank Ocean; WU LYF; Death Grips; Gary Clark Jr.; EMA; Other Lives; Wolf Gang; Abe Vigoda	Amon Tobin; M83; The Rapture; M. Ward; Dawes; Grouplove; Ximena Sariñana; Givers; honeyhoney; Wallpaper.	Datsik; Afrojack; Alesso; Madeon; Feed Me; SebastiAn; Breakbot; R3hab; LA Riots; Méa; Plastic Flowers

The Do LaB Weekend 1: Lucent Dossier Experience, Stephan Jacobs, Sugarpill, Jupit3r, Gladkill, Russ Liquid, GoldRush, CrisB., Jobot, Patricio

The Do LaB Weekend 2: Lucent Dossier Experience, Jupit3r, Patricio, Jeremy Sole, Marley Carroll, Geno Cochino, Natasha Kmeto, Quade

Heineken Dome Weekend 1: EC Twins, Andy Caldwell, Hot Mouth, Zen Freeman, La' Reda

Heineken Dome Weekend 2: Roy Davis Jr. featuring J. Noize (live), David Harness, Marques Wyatt, J Paul Getto, Cappa Regime

==== Saturday, April 14 & 21 ====
Coachella Stage	Outdoor Theatre	Gobi	Mojave	Sahara
**Radiohead**; Bon Iver; The Shins; Noel Gallagher's High Flying Birds; Kaiser Chiefs; Awolnation; Childish Gambino; We Are Augustines; Juice	Miike Snow; Feist; Jeff Mangum; Andrew Bird; Tune-Yards; Grace Potter and the Nocturnals; Destroyer; We Were Promised Jetpacks; Suedehead; DJP	ASAP Rocky; SBTRKT; Flying Lotus; St. Vincent; Laura Marling; Buzzcocks; Firehose; Azealia Banks; The Vaccines; Spector; Kiss Kiss Bang Bang	Sub Focus; Godspeed You! Black Emperor; Kasabian; Squeeze; Manchester Orchestra; The Head and the Heart; The Big Pink; Black Lips; Dragonette; Keep Shelly in Athens; Tijuana Panthers	Kaskade; David Guetta; Fedde le Grand; Sebastian Ingrosso; Martin Solveig; Zeds Dead; Jacques Lu Cont; Borgore; Mt Eden; Destructo; Pure Filth Sound (live show)

The Do LaB Weekend 1: Patricio, Lucent Dossier Experience, Two Fingers, Machine Drum, Pumpkin, Christian Martin, Worthy, iDiot Savant, Sammy Bliss

The Do LaB Weekend 2: Empire Strikes Back!, Lucent Dossier Experience, Lowriderz, Sidecar Tommy, Shawna, David Satori, SaQi, ill-esha

Heineken Dome Weekend 1: Starkillers featuring. Dmitry Ko, Droog, Fernando Garibay, John Beaver, Team No Sleep

Heineken Dome Weekend 2: Donald Glaude, Audrey Napoleon, Save the Robot, Colette, Ranidu Lankage, Siren

==== Sunday, April 15 & 22 ====
Coachella Stage	Outdoor Theatre	Gobi	Mojave	Sahara
**Dr. Dre & Snoop Dogg** (featured guest spots from Eminem, 50 Cent, Wiz Khalifa, Kendrick Lamar, Kurupt, Warren G and a holographic version of Tupac Shakur); At the Drive-In; Justice; The Hives; Fitz and the Tantrums; Santigold; Band of Skulls; Mantastique	Florence and the Machine; Girl Talk; The Weeknd; Wild Flag; The Growlers; Seun Kuti & Egypt 80; Metronomy; Lissie; Sleeper Agent	DJ Shadow; Company Flow; The Airplane Boys; The Gaslamp Killer; Thundercat; Real Estate; Greg Ginn and the Royal We; Le Butcherettes; Housse de Racket; Alf Alpha	Modeselektor (featuring Thom Yorke, weekend 2 only); Beirut; Gotye; AraabMuzik; Beats Antique; Wild Beasts; First Aid Kit; Oberhofer; Gardens & Villa; Tyler Uppercut	Avicii; Calvin Harris; Nero; Dada Life; Porter Robinson; Flux Pavilion & Doctor P; Zedd; Noisia; Morgan Page; Jimbo Jenkins

The Do LaB Weekend 1: Empire Strikes Back!, Lucent Dossier Experience, KRADDY, NastyNasty, R/D, David Starfire, NitGrit, Salva, Deru, Inspired Flight, Hopscotch

The Do LaB Weekend 2: Lucent Dossier Experience, Minnesota, Live & Light, LYNX, Griz, Imagika, oscure, Dov, Ruff Hauser

Heineken Dome Weekend 1: Mike Balance, Late Night Sneaky (live) White Noize, DJ Dan, Mike Balance

Heineken Dome Weekend 2: Doc Martin featuring Sublevel (live), Gene Hunt, Wally Callerio, Barry Weaver, Dusty Carter

Dropped Acts: Cat Power, La Roux, The Midnight Beast, Black Sabbath

In 2012, art was contributed by The Do LaB: (Oasis) + (Triad), Lucent Dossier Experience, Coachella Art Studios, Charles Gadeken: (WAVE), Todd Williams: (Land Shark), Gerard Minakawa: (Starry Bamboo), Hotshot the Robot, Susan Robb: (Warmth, Giant Black Tubes), Christian Ristow: (Garaplata), Shrine: (Shacks), Robert Bose: (Balloon Chain), Sensory Sync: (Gateway), Poetic Kinetic: (Solitary Inflorescence), Cyclecide and Makeover Mechanix.

=== 2013 ===
==== Friday, April 12 & 19 ====
Coachella Stage	Outdoor Theatre	Gobi	Mojave	Sahara	Yuma
**The Stone Roses** (main headliner for Weekend 1); **Blur** (main headliner for Weekend 2); Yeah Yeah Yeahs; Modest Mouse; Passion Pit; Metric; Stars; Dâm-Funk; Tokyo Ska Paradise Orchestra; Skinny Lister	Tegan and Sara; Jurassic 5; Band of Horses; Beach House; Local Natives; Of Monsters and Men; Divine Fits; Aesop Rock; Beardyman; The Neighbourhood; White Arrows; Falcons (Weekend 1 only); Mr. Carmack (Weekend 2 only)	Earl Sweatshirt; Foals; Purity Ring; TNGHT; Jello Biafra and the Guantanamo School of Medicine; Lee "Scratch" Perry; Japandroids; James McCartney; Poliça; The Shouting Matches; Deathfix; IO Echo; Moustache	How to Destroy Angels; Grinderman; Infected Mushroom; Sparks; Palma Violets; Alt-J; Johnny Marr; Jake Bugg; Youth Lagoon; Lord Huron; You Me & Us	Bassnectar; Modestep; Wolfgang Gartner; Dog Blood; Nicky Romero; Tommy Trash; Thomas Gold; Dillon Francis; C2C; Sam XL Pure Filth Sound; DJ Geo (Weekend 1 only); Dangerous Stranger (Weekend 2 only); DJP (playing All Scott Hardkiss set)	Luciano; Seth Troxler; DJ Harvey; Four Tet; Pete Tong; Raymond Roker; Mario Cotto; Sece

The Do LaB Weekend 1: Goldrush, Lucent Dossier Experience, Run DMT, R/D, Robotic Pirate Monkey, Unlimited Gravity, G Jones, Manic Focus, Jupit3r, Hunterleggitt

The Do LaB Weekend 2: Kastle, Lucent Dossier Experience, Kraddy, Jupit3r, Stephan Jacobs, Sugarpill, Metaphase, Astronautica

Heineken Dome Weekend 1: Kenny "Dope" Gonzalez, DJ Spen, Acid Face, Sex Panther, David Paul

Heineken Dome Weekend 2: Gene Farris, Sonny Fodera, J. Phlip, Ale Rauen (b2b) Rodrigo Vieira, Lexal

==== Saturday, April 13 & 20 ====
Coachella Stage	Outdoor Theatre	Gobi	Mojave	Sahara	Yuma
**Phoenix**; The xx; The Postal Service; Hot Chip; Violent Femmes (switching places with Café Tacvba, Weekend 2); Café Tacvba; Dropkick Murphys; Biffy Clyro (Weekend 1 only); Theophilus London; Vintage Trouble; DJ Gabe Real	Sigur Rós; Two Door Cinema Club; Descendents; Yeasayer; Portugal. The Man; Puscifer; Ben Howard; Danny Brown; Action Bronson; Trash Talk; Reignwolf; Abjo (Weekend 1 only); Insightful (Weekend 2 only)	Booka Shade; Janelle Monáe; Pusha T; Spiritualized; Make-Up; El-P; The Selecter; Allen Stone; The Evens; Shovels & Rope; Guards; The Colourist	New Order; Franz Ferdinand; Simian Mobile Disco; Grizzly Bear; Major Lazer; Bat for Lashes; 2 Chainz; Savages; Wild Nothing; Mona; The Wombats; Kids These Days	Knife Party; Moby (DJ set); Benny Benassi; Fedde Le Grand; Bingo Players; Kill the Noise; Baauer; Birdy Nam Nam; 3Ball MTY; Been Trill	Richie Hawtin; Cassy; Julio Bashmore; Jason Bentley; The 2 Bears; Zane Lowe (Weekend 1, only); Huoratron; Lauren Lane

The Do LaB Weekend 1: Sammy Bliss, Idiot Savant, Lucent Dossier Experience, Jeremy Sole, Marques Wyatt, Orchard Lounge, POD

The Do LaB Weekend 2: Russ Liquid, Jobot, Lucent Dossier Experience, Black 22's, Pumpkin, Patricio, Hunterleggit, Pickles

Heineken Dome Weekend 1: DJ Pierre, Gene Hunt, Whitenoize, Alain Octavio, Sleight of Hands, Deron

Heineken Dome Weekend 2: Mark Farina, Roy Davis Jr., Donald Glaude, Tim Mason, Ivan Ruiz

==== Sunday, April 14 & 21 ====
Coachella Stage	Outdoor Theatre	Gobi	Mojave	Sahara	Yuma
**Red Hot Chili Peppers**; Nick Cave and the Bad Seeds; Vampire Weekend; Social Distortion; The Lumineers; The Gaslight Anthem; The Airborne Toxic Event; Ghost B.C.; Slipping Into Darkness; Mantastique	Wu-Tang Clan; Pretty Lights; Tame Impala; Dinosaur Jr.; Kurt Vile & the Violators; JEFF the Brotherhood; Smith Westerns; Raider Klan; Wild Belle; Sango (Weekend 1 only); Esta (Weekend 2 only)	Disclosure; Parov Stelar Band (Weekend 1 only); Dub FX (replaced Parov Stelar Band spot on Weekend 2); OMD; Father John Misty; Rodriguez; Tanlines; Grimes; Thee Oh Sees; The Three O'Clock; Hanni El Khatib; Little Green Cars; Jimbo Jenkins	Dead Can Dance; Roni Size & Dynamite MC; The Faint; La Roux; James Blake; Alex Clare; Jessie Ware; DIIV; Cloud Nothings; Robert DeLong; Deap Vally	Eric Prydz; Excision presents The Executioner; Hardwell; Paul Oakenfold; Paul Kalkbrenner; Mimosa; Dirtyphonics; Danny Avila; Mord Fustang; Adrian Lux	Jamie Jones; Loco Dice; Maya Jane Coles; Joris Voorn; Jamie xx (playing after Lauren Lane, Weekend 1); Ladies Night; JDH and DAVE P; Droog

- Dub FX playing at the 10:25PM at The Do Lab (Weekend 1)

The Do LaB Weekend 1: Sammy Bliss, Idiot Savant, Lucent Dossier Experience, Jeremy Sole, Marques Wyatt, Orchard Lounge, POD

The Do LaB Weekend 2: Thugfucker, Worthy, Lucent Dossier Experience, J. Phlip, Christian Martin, Nick Monaco, Jason Burns

Heineken Dome Weekend 1: DJ Sneak (b2b) Doc Martin, DJ Dan, Mike Balance, Buds not Bombs, Elz

Heineken Dome Weekend 2: Stanton Warriors, Lazy Rich, Dzeko & Torres, Cappa Regime, Carlos Alfonzo

Dropped Acts: Unicorn Kid, Lou Reed

In 2013, art contributions included: The Power Station by Derek Doublin, Vanessa Bonet and Chris Wagganer, Helix Poeticus (The Snail) by Poetic Kinetics, Los Angeles. CAUC Twins by Syd Klinge, Los Angeles. Recyclosauras Rex by Johny Amerika, Los Angeles. Mirage by Paul Clemente, Los Angeles. PK-107 Mantis by Poetic Kinetics, Los Angeles.

=== 2014 ===
==== Friday, April 11 & 18 ====
Coachella Stage	Outdoor Theatre	Gobi	Mojave	Sahara	Yuma
**OutKast**; Girl Talk; Chromeo; Ellie Goulding; AFI; Grouplove; MS MR; Anthony Green; The Preatures	The Knife; The Replacements; Broken Bells; Neko Case; Haim; A$AP Ferg; Dum Dum Girls; GOAT; Flatbush Zombies; The Bots	Anti-Flag; Caravan Palace; Flume; Woodkid; Shlohmo; Kate Nash; The Jon Spencer Blues Explosion; Jagwar Ma; Austra; Wye Oak; Gabba Gabba Heys	†††; The Cult; Bryan Ferry; Bonobo; The Afghan Whigs; Bastille; Aloe Blacc; Title Fight; ZZ Ward; Waxahatchee; Tom Odell; Co.Fee (Weekend 1 only); KAB (Weekend 2 only)	Michael Brun; Zedd; Martin Garrix; The Glitch Mob; Carnage; Gareth Emery; Deorro; DJ Falcon; Mako; DJP; Boubakiki	Dixon; Hot Since 82; Solomun; Nicolas Jaar; Duke Dumont; Nina Kraviz; Damian Lazarus; Davide Squillace; Lee Wells; Alf Alpha

The Do LaB Weekend 1: Minnesota vs. G Jones, Sound Remedy, Lucent Dossier Experience, Lowriderz, Gladkill, K Theory, Supervision, Thriftworks, Paul Basic

The Do LaB Weekend 2: Thugfucker, DJ Tennis, Idiot Savant, Lucent Dossier Experience, Kidnap Kid, Isaac Tichauer, Perseus, Moonboots, Henry Krinkle, Jobot

Heineken House Weekend 1: Last Call, Mike Will Made It, Solomun, Sneaky Sound System, Team Supreme, Eric Sharp

Heineken House Weekend 2: Carnage & Guests, Surprise Guest, Mike Will Made It, Escort, Kingdom x Nguzunguzu, Team Supreme, Sean Glass

==== Saturday, April 12 & 19 ====
Coachella Stage	Outdoor Theatre	Gobi	Mojave	Sahara	Yuma
**Muse**; Queens of the Stone Age; Foster the People; MGMT; Kid Cudi; City and Colour; Cage the Elephant; Graveyard; Unlocking the Truth	Nas; Pharrell Williams; Sleigh Bells; Lorde; Capital Cities; The Head and the Heart; Chvrches; Ty Segall; Foxygen; Syd Arthur; Saints of Valory	The Dismemberment Plan; DARKSIDE; Galantis; Solange; Future Islands; Washed Out; Holy Ghost!; Banks; White Lies; The Internet; Laura Mvula; AFTA-1	Pet Shop Boys; Mogwai; Pixies; RL Grime; Warpaint; Julian Casablancas; Bombay Bicycle Club; Temples; Drowners; Bear Hands; Young & Sick; WoodysProduce	Skrillex; Empire of the Sun; Fatboy Slim; Dillon Francis; GTA; Carbon Airways; TJR; Headhunterz; MAKJ; UZ; Revell	Tiga; The Magician; Nicole Moudaber; Cajmere; Guy Gerber; Aeroplane; Sander Kleinenberg; Ricoshëi; Lesto

The Do LaB Weekend 1: Totally Enormous Extinct Dinosaurs, Kastle, Rone, Sébastien Léger, Justin Martin, Gorgon City, Christian Martin, J.Phlip, Worthy, Sammy Bliss

The Do LaB Weekend 2: Odesza, Kraddy, Swear Beats, Benji Vaughn, Blond:ish, Patricio, Eduardo Castillo, Mikey Lion, Lafa Taylor

Heineken House Weekend 1: Last Call, The Gaslamp Killer vs. Thundercat, Nosaj Thing, Alvin Risk, Valentino Khan, Hundred Waters, Heartsrevolution, Anna Lunoe, Franki Chan

Heineken House Weekend 2: GZA with Gaslamp Killer, Gaslamp Killer & Thundercat, UZ & Surprise Guest, Anabel Englund x Human Life, Escort with Guests, Chela, Anna Lunoe, Franki Chan

==== Sunday, April 13 & 20 ====
Coachella Stage	Outdoor Theatre	Gobi	Mojave	Sahara	Yuma
**Arcade Fire**; Beck; Calvin Harris; The Naked and Famous; Zoé; Chance the Rapper (cancelled Weekend 2); Fishbone; Trombone Shorty & Orleans Avenue	Disclosure; Lana Del Rey; Neutral Milk Hotel; Blood Orange; The 1975; STRFKR; Surfer Blood; J Roddy Walston and the Business; Ratking	Lucent Dossier Experience; Jhené Aiko; John Newman; The Toy Dolls; AlunaGeorge; Superchunk; Frank Turner; Courtney Barnett; Bombino; Factory Floor; Bo Ningen	Netsky; Motörhead; Daughter; Little Dragon; Flosstradamus; Rudimental; Classixx; Poolside; Preservation Hall Jazz Band; James Vincent McMorrow; Machin' (only Weekend 1); CIVX (only Weekend 2)	Duck Sauce; Adventure Club; Big Gigantic; Alesso; Krewella; Showtek; Flight Facilities; Anna Lunoe; John Beaver	Bicep; Laurent Garnier; Maceo Plex; Art Department; Lee Burridge; Scuba; The Martinez Brothers; Cooper Saver; Equip

The Do LaB Weekend 1: Kill Paris, Sugarpill, Dimond Saints, Slow Magic, ill-esha, Chrime Sparks, El Papa Chango, Two Fresh, Vokab Kompany & Crush Effect, Dessert Dwellers

The Do LaB Weekend 2: Mitis, Opiuo, Freddy Todd, Jupit3r, Love & Light, Chris B, Hunterleggit, Hopscotch, Ruff Hauser

Heineken House Weekend 1: Last Call, Flight Facilities, Chela, MDNR, Femme, Sean Glass x Goddollars

Heineken House Weekend 2: Classixx (DJ), Escort with MNDR, Surprise Guest, Flight Facilities, Preservation Hall Jazz Band, Surprise Guest, MDNR, Femme, Sean Glass

Dropped Acts: Beady Eye

In 2014, art contributions included: 2Squared by Charles Gadeken; Balloon Chain by Robert Bose; Becoming Human by Christian Ristow; Cryochome by James Peterson; The Do Lab by Eepert Village; Escape Velocity (The Astronaut) by Poetic Kinetics; Smartbird by Festo; Giant Green Caterpillar by Mike Grandaw; Lightweaver by Stereo-Bot; Lucent Dossier Experience; Reflection Field by Philip K. Smith III; Archetypes by Keith Greco; Archetypes by Brent Spears/Shrine; Sidewinder by Abigail Portner; Paraiso by Raices Cultura; Road Trip by Don Kennel; Intentcity by Teale Hatheway; The Jive Joint; and Coachella Art Studios.

=== 2015 ===
==== Friday, April 10 & 17 ====
Coachella Stage	Outdoor Theatre	Gobi	Mojave	Sahara	Yuma
**AC/DC**; Tame Impala; Interpol; The War on Drugs; Azealia Banks; Charles Bradley and his Extraordinaries; Action Bronson; Vic Mensa	Nero; Steely Dan; Alabama Shakes; Raekwon & Ghostface Killah; Angus & Julia Stone; Lil B; Allah-Las; Brant Bjork and the Low Desert Punk Band; The Ghost of a Saber Tooth Tiger; Alchemy	Squarepusher; Todd Terje and the Olsens; Gorgon City; Hot Natured; Ride; Kimbra; Ab-Soul; Cloud Nothings; Eagulls; Ruen Brothers; Moustache	Flying Lotus; Caribou; Lykke Li; Ryan Hemsworth; Kiesza; Sylvan Esso; George Ezra (cancelled Weekend 1); The Reverend Horton Heat; Haerts; Los Rakas	Alesso; Porter Robinson; DJ Snake; R3hab; Oliver Heldens; Keys N Krates; Alvin Risk; Trippy Turtle; Peking Duk; DJP	MK; Chris Malinchak; Pete Tong; Jon Hopkins; Erol Alkan; Lee Foss; Marquess Wyatt; Freddy Be

The Do LaB Weekend 1: Loudpvck, Jackal, Fort Knox Five, Lucent Dossier Experience, Lane 8, Jesse Wright, Mihkal, Dirtwire, B.R.E.E.D., Clozee

The Do LaB Weekend 2: Gorgon City DJ set, Dr. Fresch, My Favorite Robot, Lucent Dossier Experience, Mija, Atish, Lisbona, Sabo, Patricio & Shawni, Whitehorse

Heineken House Weekend 1: Hot Dub Time Machine, Rome Fortune, A-Trak, Keys N Krates, Gladiator, Bosco, Athletixx, Nick Catchdubs, Craze

Heineken House Weekend 2: Hot Dub Time Machine, Keys N Krates, Treasure Fingers, Bosco, Athletixx, Gladiator, Craze, Nick Catchdubs

==== Saturday, April 11 & 18 ====
Coachella Stage	Outdoor Theatre	Gobi	Mojave	Sahara	Yuma
The Weeknd; **Jack White**; alt-J; Hozier; Milky Chance; Bad Religion; Clean Bandit; Nortec Collective Presents Bostich+Fussible	Axwell and Ingrosso; Flosstradamus; Tyler, The Creator; Father John Misty; Belle and Sebastian; Chet Faker; Andrew McMahon in the Wilderness; Royal Blood; Perfume Genius; Jamestown Revival; Phox; Mantastique	Swans; Drive Like Jehu; FKA twigs; The Gaslamp Killer Experience; Glass Animals; Yelle; Cashmere Cat; Benjamin Booker; Lights; Parquet Courts; Coasts; Until the Ribbon Breaks	Antemasque; SBTRKT; Tycho; Kasabian; Run the Jewels; Jungle; Toro y Moi; Bad Suns; St. Paul and The Broken Bones; Ryn Weaver; Tourist; Radkey	Ratatat; Deorro; Duke Dumont; Cedric Gervais; Dirty South; Yellow Claw; Gramatik; Alison Wonderland; Matthew Koma; Bixel Boys; Dem Ham Boyz	Annie Mac; Loco Dice; DJ Harvey; Danny Tenaglia; Carl Craig; Tales of Us; Andrea Oliva; Lauren Lane; Mor Elian

The Do LaB Weekend 1: Ooah, Russ Liquid, Falcons, Joe Kay X Jay Prince, An-Ten-Nae, Droog, Sébastien Léger, Justin Jay, Addatap

The Do LaB Weekend 2: Adam Freeland, Kraddy, A Tribe Called Red, CRNKN, Redux, Hoodboi, Robot Koch, Goldrush, TASTYTREAT, Tropicool, Andrew Luce

Heineken House Weekend 1: Questlove, Vice, Peanut Butter Wolf, Cassian B2B Light Year, Hot Tub Time Machine, Sosupersam

Heineken House Weekend 2: Hot Dub Time Machine, Sir Mix-a-Lot, Vice, Peanut Butter Wolf, Cassian B2B Light Year, SOSUPERSAM

==== Sunday, April 12 & 19 ====
Coachella Stage	Outdoor Theatre	Gobi	Mojave	Sahara	Yuma
**Drake**; Florence and the Machine; Kaskade; Marina and the Diamonds; St. Lucia; Circa Survive; The Orwells; Saint Motel; Jimbo Jenkins	Fitz and the Tantrums; St. Vincent; Ryan Adams; Jenny Lewis; Built to Spill; Mac DeMarco; Joyce Manor; Chicano Batman; Gabe Real	Kaytranada; ODESZA; Jamie xx; Philip Selway; The Cribs; Desaparecidos; Sturgill Simpson; MØ; Angel Olsen; Night Terrors of 1927; Astronautica (Weekend 1 Only); Eevaan Tre & the Show (Weekend 2 Only)	Kygo; Gesaffelstein; Stromae; Brand New; Vance Joy; RAC; Panda Bear; OFF!; Touché Amoré; Sloan; Little Red Spiders (Weekend 1 Only); Wavegroove (Weekend 2 Only)	David Guetta; New World Punx; Madeon; Martin Solveig; What So Not; Claude VonStroke; Alf Alpha; superduperbrick; Soslo	J.E.S.+S. (Jackmaster, Eats Everything, Skream & Seth Troxler); Guy Gerber; Ben Klock; Jason Bentley; John Talabot; Tiger and Woods; tINI; Doc Martin feat. Sub Level (live); Trent Cantrelle

The Do LaB Weekend 1: Bonobo, M.A.N.D.Y., Edu Imbernon, Till von Sein, Coyote Kisses, Jai Wolf, Hayden James, Bit Funk, Cassian

The Do LaB Weekend 2: Chet Faker DJ set, J.Phlip, Worthy, Pomo, Tokimonsta, Dance Spirit, Louis Futton, Morillo, Hunter Leggit, Clozee

Heineken House Weekend 1: Doc Martin, Jillionaire, Machel Montano, Grandtheft, Hot Dub Time Machine, Willem Wolfe, Richie Beretta

Heineken House Weekend 2: Hot Dub Time Machine, Jillionaire with Bunji Garlin & Fay-Ann Lyons, Jillionaire, TWRK, Ape Drums, Richie Beretta

Dropped Acts: Kele, Dubfire

In 2015, art contributions included: Papilio Merraculous by Poetic Kinetics; Do LaB by Big Fish; Balloon Chain by Robert Bose; Party God by the Haas Brothers; Big Bear by Don Kennell; Praxis by Ben Zamora and John Zamora; Pulp Pavilion by Ball-Nogues Studio; the Corporate Headquarters by Derek Doublin and Vanessa Bonet; Earthmover by Christian Ristow; the Jive Joint by Super Tall Paul & Rossome; Big Horn Place by Shrine & Joel Dean Stockdill; Pulp Pavilion by Ball-Nogues Studio; Coachella Bound by Raices Cultura; Twelve Shades of Pass.ani by Keith Greco; Lighthouse by Randy Polumbo; Chrono Chromatic by Aphidoidea; and Coachella Art Studios.

=== 2016 ===
==== Friday, April 15 & 22 ====
Coachella Stage	Outdoor Theatre	Gobi	Mojave	Sahara	Yuma
**LCD Soundsystem**; Ellie Goulding; M83; Of Monsters and Men; Foals; Years & Years; Joey Bada$$; Gabe Real	Jack Ü; Sufjan Stevens; A$AP Rocky; The Kills; Lord Huron; Robert DeLong; The Front Bottoms; Carla Morrison; Versis (only Weekend 1); Softest Hard (only Weekend 2)	Volbeat; Lemaitre; Parov Stelar; Lido; St Germain; Christine and the Queens; Bob Moses; Goldroom; Mavis Staples; Frances; Mbongwana Star	Purity Ring; Snakehips; Savages; The Last Shadow Puppets; BØRNS; Gallant; Ibeyi; Miami Horror; HEALTH; Låpsley; HÆLOS; Sheer Mag	Lucent Dossier Experience; Rae Sremmurd; G-Eazy; Underworld; 2manyDJs; DJ Mustard; Sam Feldt; Louis the Child; Skepta (cancelled both weekends); Nina Las Vegas; Synergy (only Weekend 1); Cosmic Crates (only Weekend 2)	Marco Carola; Nicole Moudaber & Skin; Sasha (cancelled both weekends); Black Coffee; Nic Fanciulli; George FitzGerald; SG Lewis; DJ EZ; Masha

The Do LaB Weekend 1: What So Not, Speaker of the House, KRNE, Ghastly, Wave Racer, Stylust Beats, JayKode, Everyman, Dreamers Delight, Mountain of Youth

The Do LaB Weekend 2: Hippie Sabotage, Sweater Beats, Stwo, Sam Gellaitry, Ekali, Autograf (DJ set), Gilligan Moss, Nico Luminous, The Human Experience

Heineken House Weekend 1: DJ Jayceeoh, Doctor P, Crizzly, Green Lantern, Kayzo, CRNKN, Protohype, UFO!

Heineken House Weekend 2: DJ Jayceeoh, Doctor P, Ookay, Protohype, Kayzo, Green Lantern, CRNKN, UFO!

==== Saturday, April 16 & 23 ====
Coachella Stage	Outdoor Theatre	Gobi	Mojave	Sahara	Yuma
**Guns N' Roses**; Ice Cube; Disclosure; CHVRCHES; Run the Jewels; Gary Clark Jr.; Moon Taxi	Zedd; Halsey; Courtney Barnett; Rhye; Zella Day; Chronixx; Protoje; Ex Hex; brightener (only Weekend 1); The Flusters (only Weekend 2)	Shamir; BADBADNOTGOOD; RÜFÜS DU SOL; The Damned; SZA; Bat for Lashes; Lush (cancelled Weekend 1); Alvvays; DMA's; GoGo Penguin; The Dead Ships	Dubfire; Grimes; Silversun Pickups; Unknown Mortal Orchestra; The Arcs; Deerhunter; James Bay; Strangers You Know; Cloves; Algiers; Phases	RL Grime; ZHU; Snails; Vince Staples; AlunaGeorge; Matoma; Lost Frequencies; Mr. Carmack; Vanic; Jimbo Jenkins (only weekend 1); DJ Morsy (only weekend 2); Dirty Mop (only weekend 1); Big Game (only weekend 2)	Justin Martin (switching spots with Nina Kraviz, on Weekend 2); Nina Kraviz; Mano Le Tough; DJ Koze; Matthew Dear; Sophie; The Black Madonna; Amine Edge & DANCE; Lee K

The Do LaB Weekend 1: The Glitch Mob, PANTyRAiD, Paper Diamond, Brillz, San Holo, Big Wild, Jerry Folk, The Funk Hunters, FDVM, Active Sun,

The Do LaB Weekend 2: Marc Kinchen, Claptone, Cut Snake, Hotel Garuda, Ardalan, Sacha Robotti, Walker & Royce, Patricio, Jesse Wright, Hunter Leggit

Heineken House Weekend 1: Warren G, Just Blaze, Too $hort, DJ Premier, Two Fresh, LONDONBRIDGE, TRAVISWILD

Heineken House Weekend 2: Just Blaze, Warren G, DJ Premier, Lookas, Two Fresh, LONDONBRIDGE, TRAVISWILD

==== Sunday, April 17 & 24 ====
Coachella Stage	Outdoor Theatre	Gobi	Mojave	Sahara	Yuma
**Calvin Harris**; Sia; Major Lazer; The 1975; Matt and Kim; Rancid; Nathaniel Rateliff & the Night Sweats; RecordSafari	Flume; Beach House; Edward Sharpe and the Magnetic Zeros; Cold War Kids; Wolf Alice; Kamasi Washington; Young Fathers; Girlpool; MINT FIELD	Deafheaven; Death Grips; Alessia Cara; Chris Stapleton; Autolux; Pete Yorn; Meg Myers; The Vandals; Tei Shi; Steady Holiday; AFTA-1	Nosaj Thing; Miike Snow; Anderson .Paak & the Free Nationals; Melody's Echo Chamber; Crystal Fighters; Hudson Mohawke; Joywave; The Heavy; PRAYERS; De Lux; Swarvy (only Weekend 1); EROK (only Weekend 2)	KSHMR; The Chainsmokers; Tchami; Baauer; TOKiMONSTA; Thomas Jack; Claptone IMMORTAL LIVE; Epik High; Mister Blaqk (only Weekend 1); David J Prince (only Weekend 2)	Maceo Plex; Adam Beyer & Ida Engberg; John Digweed; Tensnake; Soul Clap; Cassy; Fur Coat; AC Slater; Lisbona Sisters

The Do LaB Weekend 1: Bob Moses (DJ set), Job Jobse, The Drifter, Lee Foss, RÜFÜS DU SOL (DJ set), Le Youth, Humans, Imagined Herbal Flows, Dena Amy,

The Do LaB Weekend 2: Major Lazer, Kraddy, Stanton Warriors, Jason Bentley, NU, Bedouin, Satori, Öona Dahl, Shawni

Heineken House Weekend 1: Diplo & Friends, 4B, Brillz, Valentino Khan, ETC! ETC!, Bro Safari, Party Favor, Nina Las Vegas, FKi 1st, Paul Devro x Neo Fresco,

Heineken House Weekend 2: Party Favor, ETC! ETC!, Bro Safari, Nina Las Vegas, 4B, Valentino Khan, FKi 1st, Paul Devro x Neo Fresco

Plus: DESPACIO playing all weekend long

Dropped Acts: Nora En Pure

In 2016, art contributions included: Katrīna Neiburga and Andris Eglītis, Alex Arrechea, The Date Farmers, Phillip K Smith III, Jimenez Lai, R & R Studios, Robert Bose, Super Tall Paul & Rossome, Raices Cultura, Lucent Dossier

=== 2017 ===
==== Friday, April 14 & 21 ====
Coachella Stage	Outdoor Theatre	Mojave	Gobi	Sahara	Sonora	Yuma
**Radiohead**; The xx; Father John Misty; Glass Animals; Bonobo; Preservation Hall Jazz Band; RecordSafari	Travis Scott; Phantogram; Oh Wonder; Mac DeMarco; King Gizzard & the Lizard Wizard; Stormzy	DRAM; Capital Cities; DJ Shadow; Richie Hawtin; The Avalanches; Broods; Sampha; Tennis; Joseph; Zipper Club; Dudu Tassa & The Kuwaitis	Sam Gellaitry; Denzel Curry; Little Dragon; Jagwar Ma; Banks; Francis and the Lights; Raury; Sohn; The Lemon Twigs; Klangstof; Kayves	Dillon Francis; Empire of the Sun; Steve Angello; Mac Miller; Crystal Castles; Big Gigantic; Kungs; SNBRN; Strange Club; Andre Power	Guided by Voices; The Interrupters; Shannon and the Clams; Tacocat; Diamante Eléctrico; The Paranoyds; Surfbort; Tall Juan; Jim Smith	Loco Dice; The Martinez Brothers; Dixon; BICEP; Floorplan; Nora En Pure; Alison Swing; Rhonda INTL DJs

The Do LaB Weekend 1: Louis the Child, Mr. Carmack, Haywyre, Bleep Bloop, The Gaslamp Killer, Sayer, Imbrsxulm Team B&L, PartyWave, Oscure

The Do LaB Weekend 2: Richie Hawtin, Jonas Rathsman, Classixx, Billy Kenny, Mad Zach, Barclay Crenshaw, Daktyl, Monte Booker, KNGSPRNGS

Heineken House: OWSLA takeover + Special Guests: Bone Thugs-n-Harmony, Grandmaster Flash (DJ set), DJ Quik, 4B*, Blaise James, Chris Lake, DJ Slink, Josh Pan**, Oshi, Whethan, Vindata

- Weekend 1 only (*)
- Weekend 2 only (**)

==== Saturday, April 15 & 22 ====
Coachella Stage	Outdoor Theatre	Mojave	Gobi	Sahara	Sonora	Yuma
**Lady Gaga**; Bon Iver; Future; Two Door Cinema Club; The Head and the Heart; Local Natives; Gabe Real	DJ Snake; Schoolboy Q; Tycho; Bastille; Chicano Batman; Banks & Steelz; Arkells; Blossoms	Classixx; Nicolas Jaar; Majid Jordan; Moderat; Mura Masa; Thundercat; Car Seat Headrest; Floating Points; Shura; Swet Shop Boys	S U R V I V E; Breakbot; Nav; Warpaint; Dreamcar; Róisín Murphy; The Atomics; Kaleo; Mitski; Bishop Briggs	Gucci Mane; Martin Garrix; Röyksopp; Tory Lanez; Gryffin; Brodinski; Autograf; Eli & Fur; Courtland	Thee Commons; Current Joys; Surf Curse; Slow Hollows; Downtown Boys; Las Ligas Menores; QUITAPENAS	Hot Since 82; Solomun; Four Tet; Daphni; Floating Points; Ben UFO; Red Axes; Miss Honey Dijon; Chris Cruse

The Do LaB Weekend 1: Tycho (DJ set), FKJ, Yotto, Eagles & Butterflies, Monolink, Sabo, Surprise, Tara Brooks, Zimmer, Gone Gone Beyond

The Do LaB Weekend 2: Skrillex, Netsky, Liquid Stranger, EINMUSIK, Justin Martin, Will Clarke, The Geek x VRV, The Librarian, HӒANA, Josh Billings & Nonfiction, divaDanielle

Heineken House Weekend 1: George Clinton & the Parliament Funkadelic, Bixel Boys, BJ the Kid, Chuckie, DJ Nu Mark, Madds, Zaytoven

Heineken House Weekend 2: Bixel Boys, BJ the Kid, Chuckie, Death, DJ Nu Mark, Madds, Twrk, Zaytoven

Dropped acts: Beyoncé

==== Sunday, April 16 & 23 ====
Coachella Stage	Outdoor Theatre	Mojave	Gobi	Sahara	Sonora	Yuma
**Kendrick Lamar**; Lorde; Porter Robinson & Madeon; Grouplove; Toots and the Maytals; Lee Fields & The Expressions	Justice; Hans Zimmer; Future Islands; Devendra Banhart; Whitney; Ezra Furman	New Order; Kehlani; Tove Lo; Kiiara; Honne; GoldLink; Tourist; Preoccupations; Big Game	What So Not; Real Estate; Jai Wolf; Jack Garratt; Nao; Sofi Tukker; Pond; Grace Mitchell; Ocho Ojos	Marshmello; Galantis; DJ Khaled; Kaytranada; Lil Uzi Vert; Skepta; Anna Lunoe; Rambo V; Westside Ty	T.S.O.L.; Twin Peaks; Allah-Las; Show Me the Body; Hinds; Caveman; Los Blenders; Jim Smith	Tale of Us; Sasha; Marcel Dettmann; Maya Jane Coles; The Belleville Three; Patrick Topping; Jen Ferrer

The Do LaB Weekend 1: Autograf, Shiba San, *Amtrac, Space Jesus, Elohim, Whethan, Bearson, Chet Porter, BOGL

The Do LaB Weekend 2: Rüfüs du Sol (DJ set), XXYYXX, Jan Blomqvist, Mikey Lion, Lee Reynolds, Marbs & Porkchop, Patricio, Lonely Boy, Jonnie King

Heineken House: NGHTMRE B2B Slander**, Armnhmr, Botnek, Eptic, JSTJR, Must Die!, Rickyxsan, Snavs, Special Guest

- Weekend 1 only (*)
- Weekend 2 only (**)

Plus: The Antarctic, an audio-visual sensory experience. All weekend long, starting on Thursday

Dropped acts: PNL

In 2017, art contributions included: Chiaozza, Olalekan Jeyifous, Joanne Tatham and Tom O'Sullivan, Gustavo Prado

=== 2018 ===
==== Friday, April 13 & 20 ====
Coachella Stage	Outdoor Theatre	Gobi	Sonora	Mojave	Sahara	Yuma
**The Weeknd**; SZA; Kygo*; Vince Staples; The Neighbourhood; SuperDuperKyle; Los Ángeles Azules	Jean-Michel Jarre; St. Vincent; The War on Drugs; Daniel Caesar; Kali Uchis; Skip Marley; Knox Fortune; JustPudge	Carpenter Brut; Maceo Plex; Perfume Genius; Belly; The Blaze; LÉON; Tank and the Bangas; PVRIS; Moses Sumney; Benjamin Clementine; DMM	The Buttertones; The Regrettes; Helado Negro; The Marías; Fazerdaze; Boogarins; Señor Kino; Jim Smith	Jamiroquai; Soulwax; Dreams; Black Coffee; Bleachers; Greta Van Fleet; Kelela; Slow Magic; MHD; Smiles Davis; Francesca Harding	REZZ; Alison Wonderland; TroyBoi; Deorro; Alan Walker; Justin Martin; Cash Cash; Whethan; Elohim; Gingee; Late Night Laggers	Detroit Love (Carl Craig, Kyle Hall, Moodymann); Moon Boots; Avalon Emerson; HITO; B.Traits; Jesse Calosso; Anakim

- On April 20, Kygo had special guest Ariana Grande during his set.

==== Saturday, April 14 & 21 ====
Coachella Stage	Outdoor Theatre	Gobi	Sonora	Mojave	Sahara	Yuma
**Beyoncé**; Haim; Tyler, the Creator; MØ; Chromeo; Nile Rodgers & Chic	Alt-J; Fleet Foxes; David Byrne; Børns; First Aid Kit; Marian Hill; Sir Sly; Alf Alpha	Highly Suspect; Tom Misch; Jorja Smith; Benjamin Booker; Alina Baraz; Angel Olsen; Sigrid; Big Thief; Sudan Archives; Ron Gallo; Birdtastique; Loboman(**)	Hundred Waters; Oh Sees; The Bronx; Cherry Glazerr; Priests; R.O.C.; Mild High Club; Otoboke Beaver; Bane's World; Jim Smith	X Japan; Jungle; Alvvays; Tash Sultana; BROCKHAMPTON; Flatbush Zombies; Django Django; Declan McKenna; Chloe x Halle; Salami Rose Joe Louis	Post Malone; blackbear; Louis the Child; Snakehips; Party Favor; Ekali; AC Slater; KITTENS; Jimbo Jenkins	The Black Madonna; Pachanga Boys; Bedouin; Jackmaster; Yaeji; Busy P; Jason Bentley; Sahar Z

Dropped acts: Wizkid

==== Sunday, April 15 & 22 ====
Coachella Stage	Outdoor Theatre	Gobi	Sonora	Mojave	Sahara	Yuma
**Eminem**; Odesza; Portugal. The Man; Cardi B; Vance Joy; LANY; Lion Babe; Gabe Real	A Perfect Circle; Miguel; Kamasi Washington; Jessie Ware; DeJ Loaf; Nothing But Thieves; Magic Giant; Juicewon; nostradahm(**)	Barclay Crenshaw; Kamaiyah; Ibeyi; Jidenna; AURORA; Hayley Kiyoko; Japanese Breakfast; Noname; Westside Gunn + Conway; Phantom Thrett	Princess Nokia; John Maus; Cuco; Buscabulla; Snail Mail; B Boys; The Delirians; Mu$ty Boyz	The Drums; King Krule; 6lack; Jacob Banks; Fidlar; Aminé; THEY.; LP; Rolling Blackouts Coastal Fever; Pax	Migos; Illenium; French Montana; Petit Biscuit; Russ; San Holo; Giraffage; Hannah Wants; CVSS	Michael Mayer; Jamie Jones; Chris Liebing; Joseph Capriati; Motor City Drum Ensemble; Talaboman; Peggy Gou; Kölsch; Omar-S; Lee Wells

=== 2019 ===
==== Friday, April 12 & 19 ====
Coachella Stage	Outdoor Theatre	Sonora	Gobi	Mojave	Sahara	Yuma
**Childish Gambino**; Janelle Monáe; The 1975; Anderson .Paak & The Free Nationals; Kacey Musgraves; Mon Laferte; Los Tucanes de Tijuana	DJ Snake; Rüfüs Du Sol; Ella Mai; Gorgon City; JPEGMafia; 88Glam; Jimbo Jenkins	U.S. Girls; The Frights; Still Woozy; Kero Kero Bonito; Rat Boy; Turnstile; Las Robertas; Tomasa Del Real; Cool Era	Yves Tumor; Charlotte Gainsbourg; Khruangbin; Polo & Pan; dvsn; Calypso Rose; Beach Fossils; Hurray for the Riff Raff; Let's Eat Grandma	Nina Kraviz; Sophie; Rosalía; Tierra Whack; SG Lewis; King Princess; Yellow Days; Vickki Acuna	Kayzo; Nora En Pure; Diplo; Blackpink; Jaden Smith; Fisher; Jauz; Anna Lunoe; Murda Child; Loboman	Hot Since 82 / Lauren Lane / Nic Fanciulli; Nicole Moudaber; Chris Lake; Kölsch; Amelie Lens; CamelPhat; Walker & Royce; Ross from Friends; Blond:ish; Dave P

==== Saturday, April 13 & 20 ====
Coachella Stage	Outdoor Theatre	Sonora	Gobi	Mojave	Sahara	Yuma
**Tame Impala**; Weezer; J Balvin; Bazzi; Sabrina Claudio; Mr Eazi; ARIZONA; Gabe Real	BASSNECTAR; Billie Eilish; Christine and the Queens; Bob Moses; Mac DeMarco; the Interrupters; Ty Segall & White Fence; Nostradahm	Superorganism; The Garden; Turnover; Hop Along; shame; Javiera Mena; the Messthetics; the Red Pears; Jim Smith	Little Simz; Parcels; Smino; Maggie Rogers; SiR; JAIN; SALES; Steady Holiday; Jambinai; CPTN KIRK	Aphex Twin; Four Tet; Virgil Abloh; Soulection; FKJ; serpentwithfeet; Wallows; CHON; Yeti Out	Kid Cudi; Wiz Khalifa; Gryffin; CloZee; Sheck Wes; Murda Beatz; Ookay; BearTraxx; John Beaver + DJ Durty	Stephan Bodzin; Idris Elba; Tale Of Us; Deep Dish; Âme; Adriatique; Lee Burridge; Agoria; Heidi Lawden

Dropped acts: Solange

==== Sunday, April 14 & 21 ====
Coachella Stage	Outdoor Theatre	Sonora	Gobi	Mojave	Sahara	Yuma
**Ariana Grande**; Khalid; Zedd; Bad Bunny; Pusha T; Burna Boy; Alf Alpha	H.E.R.; Gesaffelstein; Blood Orange; Unknown Mortal Orchestra; Social House; Tiffany Tyson	Ocho Ojos; HYUKOH; Soccer Mommy; Men I Trust; Cola Boyy; Iceage; Razorbumps; Easy Life; Mr. 5y10	Jon Hopkins; Perfume; 070 Shake; Dermot Kennedy; Alice Merton; boy pablo; Emily King; Record Safari	Kaytranada; CHVRCHES; SOFI TUKKER; Clairo; Lizzo; Dennis Lloyd; Rico Nasty; Mansionair; Ericalandia	NGHTMRE; Dillon Francis; Gucci Gang (Gucci Mane, Lil Pump, and Smokepurpp); YG; Playboi Carti; SOB X RBE; Shallou; R3LL	Cirez D; Guy Gerber; Nocturnal Sunshine; Charlotte de Witte; Dusky; Yotto; Patrice Bäumel; Jan Blomqvist; Tara Brooks

=== 2020 (Canceled) ===
Coachella 2020 was canceled due to the ongoing COVID-19 pandemic in the United States.

Friday, April 10 & 17	Saturday, April 11 & 18	Sunday, April 12 & 19
**Rage Against the Machine**; Calvin Harris; Run the Jewels; Rex Orange County; Megan Thee Stallion; Big Bang; Brockhampton; Big Sean; King Gizzard & the Lizard Wizard; City Girls; Lewis Capaldi; Madeon; Charli XCX; Lane 8; GRiZ; Chicano Batman; Omar Apollo; Kim Petras; IDLES; Daphni; The Martinez Brothers; Pink Sweat$; Peggy Gou; Hatsune Miku; TNGHT; Rich Brian; Damian Lazarus; Princess Nokia; slowthai; YBN Cordae; TOKiMONSTA; The Chats; NIKI; Malaa; PUP; The HU; The Regrettes; Friendly Fires; Sleaford Mods; Erick Morillo; Cashmere Cat; Beach Bunny; Tiga; Amyl & the Sniffers; Amber Mark; Code Orange; L'Impératrice; Kyle Watson; VNSSA; Lost Kings; Jayda G; Giselle Woo & the Night Owls; Melé; ela minus; Kynda Black	**Travis Scott**; Flume; Thom Yorke - Tomorrow's Modern Boxes; Disclosure; 21 Savage; Danny Elfman; DaBaby; Summer Walker; Anitta; Caribou; Joji; Testpilot; Swae Lee; Black Coffee; Cuco; Jai Wolf; Roddy Ricch; Yaeji; Koffee; Tchami; Dixon; Hot Chip; Carly Rae Jepsen; DJ Koze; Floating Points; Freddie Gibbs & Madlib; BADBADNOTGOOD; Pabllo Vittar; MIKA; ANNA; Snail Mail; Kruder & Dorfmeister; Steve Lacy; Weyes Blood; Masego; Orville Peck; Chelsea Cutler; Seun Kuti & Egypt 80; Matoma; 100 gecs; black midi; Nilüfer Yanya; Chris Liebing; Raveena; Sasha Sloan; beabadoobee; Ezra Collective; Inner Wave; Emo Nite; girl in red; Aya Nakamura; Samaʼ Abdulhadi; Beach Goons; Fontaines D.C.; The Murder Capital; Paco Osuna; Mannequin Pussy; The Comet is Coming; Whipped Cream; Anna Calvi; GG Magree; Ellen Allien; ONYVAA; DJ Lord; Sara Landry	**Frank Ocean**; Lana Del Rey; Lil Uzi Vert; Daniel Caesar; FKA twigs; Marina; Louis the Child; Ari Lennox; Fatboy Slim; Banda MS; Lil Nas X; Mura Masa; Duck Sauce; Jessie Reyez; SLANDER; Denzel Curry; J.I.D; Ленинград; Epik High; Duke Dumont; Lauren Daigle; Conan Gray; Bedouin; Bishop Briggs; (Sandy) Alex G; Big Wild; Alec Benjamin; Noname; YUNGBLUD; Dave; SebastiAn; Kyary Pamyu Pamyu; Emotional Oranges; Channel Tres; Crumb; Doja Cat; Ed Maverick; Ali Gatie; Hayden James; Skegss; Monolink; Dom Dolla; Satori; Black Pumas; Sampa the Great; Altin Gün; Luttrell; Nathy Peluso; Olivia O'Brien; Mariah the Scientist; Viagra Boys; Cariño; Adam Port; Guy Laliberté; Detlef; Sahar Z

=== 2021 (Canceled) ===
Originally featuring a similar lineup from the previous year, Coachella 2021 was also cancelled due to continuing uncertainty regarding the pandemic.

=== 2022 ===
==== Friday, April 15 & 22 ====
Coachella Stage	Outdoor Theatre	Sonora	Gobi	Mojave	Sahara	Yuma
**Harry Styles**; Daniel Caesar; Lil Baby; Grupo Firme; Anitta; Ari Lennox; MIKA; Princess Nokia; Juicewon (W1); Saish K (W2)	King Gizzard & the Lizard Wizard; Louis the Child; Phoebe Bridgers; Madeon; NIKI; Omar Apollo; Bishop Briggs (W1); Chelsea Cutler (W2); The Hu; Yimbo (W1); Coby (W2)	Ela Minus; Amyl and the Sniffers; PUP; Spiritualized; The Chats; Code Orange; Jean Dawson; Giselle Woo & the Night Owls; Jim Smith (W1); crudo (W2)	BADBADNOTGOOD; EPIK HIGH; The Avalanches; TOKiMONSTA; slowthai; The Marías; Role Model; The Regrettes; Arooj Aftab; Torres Martinez Birdsinging and Dancing	Lane 8; Snoh Aalegra; Pink Sweat$; Run the Jewels (W2); IDLES; Arcade Fire (W1); Carly Rae Jepsen; Still Woozy; Raveena; Lawrence; MEUTE	SLANDER; Big Sean; Baby Keem; Black Coffee; Cordae; City Girls; Dom Dolla; John Summit; Lost Kings; GG Magree; DJ Lord (W2); Venessa Michaels (W1); Gabe Real (W2)	ARTBAT; The Martinez Brothers; Peggy Gou; Damian Lazarus; Daphni; Purple Disco Machine; Jayda G; Logic1000; SOHMI; Dear Humans

The Do LaB Weekend 1: Diplo, Walker & Royce b2b VNSSA, Subtronics, Deathpact, Elephant Heart, UNIIQU3, Holly, Rochelle Jordan, Casmalia, Gee Dee + Latane from Fundido

The Do LaB Weekend 2: Yung Bae b2b Madeon, The Glitch Mob, Skream, Ivy Lab, Moore Kismet, Mindchatter, HoneyLuv, Rinzen, Sainte Vie, Red Giant Project, Mary Droppinz

Heineken House Weekend 1: Vegyn, AceMo, Black Noi$e, American Dance Ghosts, Skinny Macho, baby.com, seeso, SQREWU

Heineken House Weekend 2: AceMo, American Dance Ghosts, Jacques Greene, Whethan, Black Noi$e, Bae Bae, Alko, seeso, SQREWU

==== Saturday, April 16 & 23 ====
Coachella Stage	Outdoor Theatre	Sonora	Gobi	Mojave	Sahara	Yuma
**Billie Eilish**; Megan Thee Stallion; Flume; 88rising; Giveon; Conan Gray; Masego; Koffee; Record Safari	Stromae; Danny Elfman; Disclosure; Cuco; Wallows; Beach Bunny; Chelsea Cutler (W1); Gingee (W1); Loboman x Masio (W2)	Molchat Doma; black midi; Inner Wave; Mannequin Pussy; Nicki Nicole; Ed Maverick; Nilüfer Yanya; Beach Goons; Yard Act; Buster Jarvis (W1); Kuma (W2)	Kyary Pamyu Pamyu; Hot Chip; Freddie Gibbs (W1); Freddie Gibbs & Madlib (W2); Pabllo Vittar; Caroline Polachek; Rina Sawayama; Arlo Parks; L'Impératrice; Current Joys (W1); Surf Curse (W2); Alaina Castillo; Mark Lizaola (W1); Wave Groove (W2)	DJ Koze; Floating Points; Caribou; Steve Lacy; Turnstile; girl in red; Japanese Breakfast; Holly Humberstone; Amber Mark; Gee Dee (W1); Sabeerah Najee (W2)	21 Savage; Isaiah Rashad; Rich Brian; BROCKHAMPTON; Tchami; 100 gecs; Emo Nite; J.I.D; Whipped Cream; VNSSA; DJ Lord (W1); Latane from Fundido (W1); DJ Susan (W2)	Richie Hawtin; Dixon; Chris Liebing; ANNA; Paco Osuna; Samaʼ Abdulhadi; DJ Holographic; Layla Benitez; Miane

The Do LaB Weekend 1: SG Lewis (3 Hour DJ Set), MEUTE, Prospa, Nala, Rebecca Black & Friends (DJ Set), Major League Djz, Coco & Breezy, Life On Planets

The Do LaB Weekend 2: Patricio, Hayden James (DJ Set), SIDEPIECE, DJ BORING, Austin Millz, Joe Kay, Andre Power, ESTA, Sasha Marie, Sweet Like Chocolate

Heineken House Weekend 1: Flying Lotus + Thundercat, OG Ron C & the Chopstars, 454, Orion Sun (DJ Set), Ife Radio, Junie., Harlie, Tsugu

Heineken House Weekend 2: OG Ron C & the Chopstars, 454, Shlohmo, Yung Bae, Count Bass D, Ife Radio, Junie., Harlie, Tsugu

==== Sunday, April 17 & 24 ====
Coachella Stage	Outdoor Theatre	Sonora	Gobi	Mojave	Sahara	Yuma
**Swedish House Mafia x The Weeknd**; Doja Cat; Karol G; Maggie Rogers; Run the Jewels (W1); Banda MS; Surf Curse (W1); Gabe Real (W1); Tiffany Tyson (W2)	Jamie xx; Joji; Solomun; FINNEAS; Alec Benjamin; Yola; Mariah the Scientist; Dave P (W1); Jaqck Glam (W2)	Nathy Peluso; Current Joys (W2); Eyedress; Crumb; Viagra Boys; Skegss; Altın Gün; Cariño; interventionboi (W1); Argenis (W2)	Belly; Natanael Cano; Ali Gatie; Chicano Batman; Orville Peck; beabadoobee (W1); Hayden James; Sampa the Great; Massio (W1); Jillesque (W2)	The Blessed Madonna + Honey Dijon; Jessie Reyez; Måneskin; Dave; Fred again..; Kim Petras; Emotional Oranges; Olivia O'Brien; Inglish (W1); Yimbo (W2)	Denzel Curry; Duke Dumont; Duck Sauce; Vince Staples; Channel Tres; Griselda; Maxo Kream; Cre-8 (W1); Beijing Junglist (W2)	Michael Bibi; Fatboy Slim; Bedouin; Adam Port; Luttrell; AMÉMÉ; Cole Knight

The Do LaB Weekend 1: Dom Dolla b2b John Summit, Off The Deep End, CID, Totally Enormous Extinct Dinosaurs (DJ Set), Chloé Caillet, QRTR, Balkan Bump, Duskus

The Do LaB Weekend 2: DJ Hanzel, Elohim (DJ Set), Justin Martin, Vintage Culture, LP Giobbi, Yulia Niko, Patricio, Hunter Leggitt

Heineken House Weekend 1: Ms Nina (DJ Set), D33J, Mia Carucci, Donovan's Sound Club, Bitter Babe, PIERI, Muñeka, Mawingo, TRYi

Heineken House Weekend 2: Major League Djz, Silent Addy, Bitter Babe, Surprise Guest, PIERI, Brava, Muñeka, Mawingo, TRYi

Dropped acts: Ye, Satori

=== 2023 ===
The 2023 festival was organized from April 14–16 and 21–23 and featured Bad Bunny, Blackpink, Frank Ocean and Calvin Harris as the headlining acts.

==== Friday, April 14 & 21 ====
Coachella Stage	Outdoor Theatre	Sonora	Gobi	Mojave	Sahara	Yuma
**Bad Bunny**; Gorillaz; Burna Boy; Becky G; Pusha T; Doechii; Record Safari (W1)	The Chemical Brothers; Kaytranada; SG Lewis; YUNGBLUD; Saba; The Comet Is Coming; Juicewon (W1); Mimi (W2)	Uncle Waffles; Sasha Alex Sloan; TV Girl; Magdalena Bay; Danny Lux; Soul Glo; Lava La Rue; The Murder Capital; Jim Smith (W1); Dave From The Grave (W2)	Ashnikko; Whyte Fang; The Garden; Yves Tumor; Tobe Nwigwe; Overmono; Gabriels; ¿Téo?; Jupiter & Okwess; Desert Cahuilla Bird Singers	FKJ; Angèle; Blondie; Wet Leg; MUNA; BENEE; Domi & JD Beck; Lewis OfMan; Black Jade (W1); Record Safari (W2)	Metro Boomin; Two Friends; Jamie Jones; blink-182 (W1); MK (W2); Vintage Culture; Malaa; Dombresky; Mary Jane (W1); Yimbo (W2)	Maceo Plex; TESTPILOT; Mochakk; Idris Elba; Nora En Pure; Dennis Cruz + PAWSA; Oliver Koletzki; Kyle Watson; Chris Stussy; Juliet Mendoza

The Do LaB Weekend 1: Vintage Culture b2b Mochakk, Flight Facilities (DJ Set), James Blake presents CMYK, Whipped Cream, The Glitch Mob, Mr. Carmack, BAMBII, Michaël Brun, Andreas One

The Do LaB Weekend 2: The Brothers Macklovitch (A-Trak & Dave1), Knock2, Disco Wrek (Disco Lines b2b Ship Wrek), Of The Trees, The Funk Hunters, Maddy O'Neal, Flamingosis, Emmit Fenn, Patricio, Ali Farahani b2b Patrik Khach, Littlefoot

Heineken House Weekend 1: Felix da Housecat, Walker & Royce, Hannah Wants, Lee Wells, BONES

Heineken House Weekend 2: Emmit Fenn, Chris Stussy, Francis Mercier, HoneyLuv, Antoinette Van Dewark

==== Saturday, April 15 & 22 ====
Coachella Stage	Outdoor Theatre	Sonora	Gobi	Mojave	Sahara	Yuma
**Calvin Harris**; **BLACKPINK**; ROSALÍA; Charli XCX; 070 Shake; Marc Rebillet; BRN LUXXRY (W1)	Eric Prydz presents HOLO; boygenius; SOFI TUKKER; Hiatus Kaiyote; EARTHGANG; Rebelution; Yimbo (W1); Tiffany Tyson (W2)	NIA ARCHIVES; Bakar; Sunset Rollercoaster; The Breeders; The Linda Lindas; Ethel Cain; Destroy Boys; Bratty; Scowl; Horsegirl; Buster Jarvis (W1); Triste Juventud x TÓTEM (W2)	Donavan's Yard; Chromeo; Monolink; Eladio Carrión; Yaeji; Shenseea; Dinner Party; UMI; Elyanna; dxsko (W1); Kershawn tha Don (W2)	Labrinth; Underworld; Jai Paul; Remi Wolf; Mura Masa; Yung Lean; Snail Mail; AG Club; wave Groove (W1); Juicewon (W2)	$uicideboy$; The Kid LAROI; Tale Of Us; Diljit Dosanjh; Elderbrook; Kenny Beats; Flo Milli; Venessa Michaels (W1); Siash K (W2)	Keinemusik; Hot Since 82; WhoMadeWho; Jan Blomqvist; DJ Tennis + Carlita; Mathame; Colyn; Chloé Caillet; Francis Mercier; Talon

The Do LaB Weekend 1: Monolink, ODESZA (DJ Set), Phantoms (DJ Set), DJ Tennis, Carlita, Mild Minds (DJ Set), Uncle Waffles, Kimonos, Sohmi, Little Dinosaur, Maria También

The Do LaB Weekend 2: Gordo b2b Mathame, Elderbrook (DJ Set) plus special guests Hayden James & JOY (Anonymous), ISOxo, HOLLY b2b Machinedrum, Elephant Heart, Cloonee, it's murph, A Hundred Drums, PARALEVEN, DJ Susan, Jo Jones

Heineken House Weekend 1: Austin Millz, Method Man & Redman, DJ Pee .Wee (All Vinyl Set) (Anderson .Paak), Andre Power, Sweet Like Chocolate

Heineken House Weekend 2: Franc Moody (DJ Set), SG Lewis (DJ Set), TEED b2b SG Lewis, Totally Enormous Extinct Dinosaurs (DJ Set), Coco & Breezy, Zen Freeman

==== Sunday, April 16 & 23 ====
Coachella Stage	Outdoor Theatre	Sonora	Gobi	Mojave	Sahara	Yuma
**Frank Ocean** (W1); Four Tet x Fred again.. x Skrillex (W2); **blink-182** (W2); Björk; Kali Uchis; Porter Robinson; GloRilla	Fisher + Chris Lake; Dominic Fike; Rae Sremmurd; Big Wild; Stick Figure; Los Fabulosos Cadillacs; Jaqck Glam (W1); Gabe Real (W2)	Sudan Archives; Knocked Loose; Mareux; Alex G; Momma; Sleaford Mods; El Michels Affair; Los Bitchos; Conexión Divina; Argenis (W1); Eric Sanchez (W2)	DPR LIVE + DPR IAN; DRAMA; Cannons; 2manydjs; Romy; Fousheé; Joy Crookes; Ali Sethi; Gingee (W1); BRIGGS (W2)	The Blaze; WILLOW; Christine and the Queens; Weyes Blood; Noname; IDK; Paris Texas; DJ Lil Buddha (W1); Muezette (W2)	Boris Brejcha; A Boogie; Jai Wolf; Jackson Wang; LØREN (W1); Latto; MK (W1); Gordo (W2); Pi'erre Bourne; Loboman (W1); sir skrause (W2)	Gordo (W1); Adam Beyer; Camelphat; Sasha & John Digweed; Cassian; TSHA; LP Giobbi; Airrica; Minus the Light

The Do LaB Weekend 1: Dombresky presents Disco Dom, Kasablanca, Franky Wah, Dylan & Harry (Party Favor & Baauer), Daily Bread, Aluna, Elif, Henry Pope, Miss Javi

The Do LaB Weekend 2: DRAMA, Gioli & Assia, DEVAULT, ODD MOB, ARODES, Hank K, SYREETA, Carré b2b Samwise

Heineken House Weekend 1: LondonBridge, NGHTMRE, Whipped Cream, Niiko x Swae, Tony H

Heineken House Weekend 2: Snakehips, Fleetmac Wood, Bontan, Black V Neck, Max Styler

Plus: DESPACIO playing all weekend long

Dropped acts: 1999.ODDS

=== 2024 ===
The 2024 festival was organized from April 12–14 and 19–21 featuring Lana Del Rey, Tyler, the Creator, Doja Cat and No Doubt as the headlining acts.

==== Friday, April 12 & 19 ====
Coachella Stage	Outdoor Theatre	Sonora	Gobi	Mojave	Sahara	Yuma	Quasar
**Lana Del Rey**; Peso Pluma; Lil Uzi Vert; Sabrina Carpenter; Young Miko; Record Safari (W1); Jaqck Glam (W2)	Justice; Everything Always (Dom Dolla & John Summit); Deftones; L'Impératrice; Fundido (W1); Spiñorita (W2)	Son Rompe Pera; Clown Core; Black Country, New Road; Eartheater; The Beths; late night drive home; Narrow Head; Upchuck; doom dave (W1); Jim Smith (W2)	Suki Waterhouse; Chlöe; NEIL FRANCES; Brittany Howard; Chappell Roan; Sid Sriram; Kokoroko; Cimafunk	Anti Up; Hatsune Miku; Yoasobi; Tinashe; Faye Webster; The Japanese House; Mall Grab; DAYSonMARKET. (W1); El Ethos (W2)	Steve Angello; ATEEZ; Peggy Gou; Bizarrap; Skepta; Ken Carson; Cloonee; Skin On Skin; Sincerely, Manolo (W1); Val Fleury (W2)	Gorgon City; Adriatique; ANOTR; Kevin de Vries x Kölsch; BLOND:ISH; Innellea; Miss Monique; Ben Sterling; Keyspan	Honey Dijon x Green Velvet (W1); Honey Dijon (W1); Green Velvet (W1); Patrick Mason (W1); RÜFÜS DU SOL (DJ Set) (W2); Adam Ten x Mita Gami (W2)

The Do LaB Weekend 1: DJ Pee .Wee, Channel Tres, salute, The Dare (DJ Set), SOFI TUKKER (DJ Set), Anna Lunoe, Melé, DJ Starrza, DRĖĖĖMY

The Do LaB Weekend 2: DJ Snake (Hip Hop Set), TroyBoi, Juelz, Jon Casey, ALLEYCVT, Yung Singh, HoneyLuv, Sinca, CocoRosie, Huneycut

Heineken House Weekend 1 & 2: J. Worra, Bob Sinclar, GoldFish, Torren Foot x Kormak, Darci, DJ Noah

Dropped acts: Tyla, Lovejoy

==== Saturday, April 13 & 20 ====
Coachella Stage	Outdoor Theatre	Sonora	Gobi	Mojave	Sahara	Yuma	Quasar
**Tyler, the Creator**; **NO DOUBT**; Blur; Sublime; Santa Fe Klan; Jaqck Glam (W1); Record Safari (W2)	Gesaffelstein; Jungle; Jon Batiste; Blxst; Vampire Weekend (W1); Gabe Real (W1); Juicewon (W2)	Brutalismus 3000; Bar Italia; The Red Pears; Depresión Sonora; The Adicts; The Aquabats; Girl Ultra; Militarie Gun; Triste Juventud x Tótem (W1); Buster Jarvis (W2)	Orbital; Kevin Kaarl; Saint Levant; Oneohtrix Point Never; Palace; The Last Dinner Party; thuy; Young Fathers; Erika de Casier; Elusive (W1)	The Drums; Coi Leray; Charlotte de Witte; Bleachers; Kevin Abstract; Raye; Kenya Grace; ANIKA KAI (W1); miniMIZE (W2)	Dom Dolla; LE SSERAFIM; ISOKNOCK (ISOxo & Knock2); Ice Spice; Grimes; Purple Disco Machine; Destroy Lonely; Starrza; Loboman (W1); Venessa Michaels (W2)	The Blessed Madonna; Patrick Mason; Reinier Zonneveld; Âme x Marcel Dettmann; Will Clarke; Rebūke (W1); Mahmut Orhan; Maz; Kimonos	Michael Bibi (W1); Carlita (W1); Eric Prydz x Anyma (Sunset DJ Set) (W2)

The Do LaB Weekend 1: Adriatique b2b BLOND:ISH, Kaskade, Sam Gellaitry, VNSSA b2b Nala, Billie & Friends Party, Ahadadream, Jersey, Azzecca, Parallelle, Awen, Maddy Maia b2b Tottie

The Do LaB Weekend 2: Cloonee b2b Chris Lorenzo, Patrick Mason, KETBOI69 (KETTAMA b2b Partiboi69), Biscits, Kasbo, Westend, Beltran, AYYBO, Baby Weight, Juliet Mendoza, Val Fleury

Heineken House Weekend 1: Dennis Ferrer x Skream, Bia, T-Pain, Channel Tres (DJ Set), Marten Lou, DAYSonMARKET.

Heineken House Weekend 2: Dennis Ferrer, Bia, Fat Joe, Channel Tres (DJ Set), Marten Lou, DAYSonMARKET.

Dropped acts: Benga (Skream & Benga)

==== Sunday, April 14 & 21 ====
Coachella Stage	Outdoor Theatre	Sonora	Gobi	Mojave	Sahara	Yuma	Quasar
**Doja Cat**; J Balvin; Bebe Rexha; Carin León; YG Marley; Ludmilla	Jhené Aiko; Khruangbin; The Rose; Reneé Rapp; Tiffany Tyson (W1); Jeremiah Red (W2)	Boy Harsher; Mandy, Indiana; LATIN MAFIA; Eddie Zuko; Hermanos Gutiérrez; feeble little horse; Bb trickz; jjuujjuu; Argenis (W1); DJ Jon (W2)	ATARASHII GAKKO!; Barry Can't Swim; Two Shell; Olivia Dean; Jockstrap; Mdou Moctar; waveGroove (W1); Saya W (W2)	BICEP; Lil Yachty; Tems; Victoria Monét; 88RISING FUTURES (W1); Skream (W2); Taking Back Sunday; FLO; Honey Roots (W1); Savvy Lo (W2)	John Summit; DJ Snake; Anyma; NAV; AP Dhillon (W1); Kid Cudi (W2); Spinall; Tita Lau; BONES (W1); Canyon Cody (W2)	ARTBAT; Folamour; Carlita; Adam Ten x Mita Gami; Eli & Fur; Flight Facilities; DJ Seinfeld; JOPLYN	Jamie xx x Floating Points x Daphni (W1); Mall Grab (W1); Diplo x Mau P (W2); BLOND:ISH (W2)

The Do LaB Weekend 1: Bonobo b2b Barry Can't Swim, BODY HI by Alesso, Nikki Nair x Hudson Mohawke, Chase & Status, Hamdi, Tape B, Sicaria, Player Dave, Mia Moretti, Smiles Davis

The Do LaB Weekend 2: Skream & Friends, DJ Tennis, Dylan Brady, Sultan + Shepard, &friends, Marc Rebillet, Jasper Tygner, Julya Karma, Tinzo & JoJo (Book Club Radio), Patricio

Heineken House Weekend 1 & 2: Claptone, Lupe Fiasco, Louie Vega, Klingande, Iglesias, MISS DRE

=== 2025 ===
The 2025 festival was organized from April 11–13 and 18–20 featuring Lady Gaga, Green Day, Post Malone and Travis Scott as the headlining acts.

==== Thursday, April 10 & 17 ====
Desert Sky Weekend 1: Chris Lake

Desert Sky Weekend 2: Disco Dom

==== Friday, April 11 & 18 ====
Coachella Stage	Outdoor Theatre	Sonora	Gobi	Mojave	Sahara	Yuma	Quasar
**Lady Gaga**; Missy Elliott; Benson Boone; MARINA; Thee Sacred Souls; Gabe Real	Parcels; The Marías; Tyla; The Go-Go's; Seun Kuti & Egypt 80; Tiffany Tyson (W1); Juicewon (W2)	HiTech; SPEED; Los Mirlos; KNEECAP; julie; TOPS; vs self; Glixen; Doom Dave (W1); Jim Smith (W2)	Indo Warehouse; CA7RIEL & Paco Amoroso; Artemas; A. G. Cook; d4vd; 4batz; Maribou State; PARISI; Saison. (W1); Busterkun (W2)	The Prodigy; Miike Snow; Eyedress; Djo; Lola Young; SAINt JHN; Ravyn Lenae; Sincerely, Manolo (W1); GINGEE (W2)	Mustard; GloRilla; Yeat; LISA; Sara Landry; Three 6 Mafia; Chris Lorenzo; Austin Millz; MASSIO (W1); Loboman (W2)	Vintage Culture; Chris Stussy; Pete Tong x Ahmed Spins; Tinlicker; Beltran; Damian Lazarus; Shermanology; Moon Boots; Coco & Breezy; EREZ	The Martinez Brothers x Loco Dice (W1); Coco & Breezy x Kaleena Zanders (W1); Testpilot x Zhu (W2); Rafael x Miluhska (W2)

The Do LaB Weekend 1: Crankdat, NOTION, ATRIP, Jyoty b2b Zack Fox, DJ PEE .WEE (aka Anderson .Paak), Bob Moses (Club Set), Layla Benitez b2b Henri bergmann, BAMBII, AQUTIE, Miluhska, RM47

The Do LaB Weekend 2: AMÉMÉ b2b Coco & Breezy, Claude VonStroke, Hybrid Minds, Max Styler, Riordan, nimino, Conducta, Villager, Carola, J.Phlip, Patricio

Heineken House Weekend 1: DJ Premier, The Pharcyde, Autograf, KILIMANJARO, Mexican Institute of Sound, LOVRA

Heineken House Weekend 2: DJ Premier, Cordae, Autograf, KILIMANJARO, Mexican Institute of Sound, LOVRA

Dropped acts: FKA twigs

==== Saturday, April 12 & 19 ====
Coachella Stage	Outdoor Theatre	Sonora	Gobi	Mojave	Sahara	Yuma	Quasar
**Travis Scott**; **Green Day**; Charli xcx; T-Pain; Jimmy Eat World; skrause (W1); Record Safari (W2)	The Original Misfits; Above & Beyond; Clairo; Gustavo Dudamel & LA Phil; Japanese Breakfast; Tink; Megatone (W1); skrause (W2)	El Malilla; VTSS; Blonde Redhead; underscores; Judeline; Together Pangea; Prison Affair; Triste Juventud x Tótem (W1); Buster Jarvis (W2)	Rawayana; Beth Gibbons; Darkside; 2hollis; Viagra Boys; Glass Beams; Medium Build; Elusive (W1); Rick G (W2)	The Dare; horsegiirL; Hanumankind; Ivan Cornejo; Sam Fender; Yo Gabba Gabba!; Weezer (W1); Record Safari (W1); Ed Sheeran (W2)	Keinemusik; Mau P; ENHYPEN; Shoreline Mafia; Disco Lines; Alok; salute; Talón	Eli Brown; Amelie Lens; Mind Against x Massano; Infected Mushroom; Indira Paganotto; Klangkuenstler; Layton Giordani; DJ Gigola; HAAi	Barry Can't Swim x 2manydjs x salute (W1); Fcukers (DJ Set) x HAAi (W1); Kaskade Redux x IDRIS (W2); Tripolism x EREZ (W2)

The Do LaB Weekend 1: Sara Landry presents Blood Oath (Indira Paganotto b2b Sara Landry b2b Amelie Lens with Bad Girl Bailey, Coco & Breezy, J Worra, Jenna Shaw, Mary Droppinz & VNSSA), Ship Wrek, Kaz James, SOSA, Trixie Mattel, Zulan, Blu DeTiger DJ, Nooriyah, Kaleena Zanders, Ladies of Leisure

The Do LaB Weekend 2: D-Nice, Sammy Virji & Friends (Sammy Virji b2b Interplanetary Criminal b2b salute b2b Oppidan b2b Conducta), Snakehips b2b What So Not, Oppidan, Le Youth, Tycho DJ, Mahmut Orhan, Pretty Girl DJ, Kitty Ca$h, Paperwater, BIGGER THAN US

Heineken House Weekend 1 & 2: Qveen Herby, Pusha T, Southside (DJ Set), Murda Beatz, ZEEMUFFIN, MIRAMAR

Dropped acts: Anitta

==== Sunday, April 13 & 20 ====
Coachella Stage	Outdoor Theatre	Sonora	Gobi	Mojave	Sahara	Yuma	Quasar
**Post Malone**; Megan Thee Stallion; Junior H; beabadoobee; Shaboozey; Jaqck Glam	Polo & Pan; Zedd; JENNIE; Still Woozy; Keshi; MEUTE	Snow Strippers; Ginger Root; Circle Jerks; SOFT PLAY; Wisp; Bob Vylan; Kumo 99; Sin Rastro (W1); Salado (W2)	Amyl and the Sniffers; Arca; BigXthaPlug; Mohamed Ramadan; Amaarae; The Beaches; Hope Tala; waveGroove (W1); KsoFresko (W2)	Kraftwerk; Basement Jaxx; Rema; Jessie Murph; Muni Long; Fcukers; PENNYWILD (W1); Canyon Cody (W2)	XG; Ty Dolla $ign; Chase & Status; Boris Brejcha; Sammy Virji; Ben Böhmer; Interplanetary Criminal; Tom Breu	Dixon x Jimi Jules; Francis Mercier; Dennis Cruz; Sparrow & Barbossa; Tripolism; DESIREE; AMÉMÉ; Yulia Niko	Tiësto (W1); Odd Mob (W1); Alesso Body Hi x Gorgon City (W2); Azzecca x Annicka (W2)

The Do LaB Weekend 1: Zeds Dead, RUDIM3NTAL b2b Skepsis, MK b2b Becky Hill, Levity, Confidence Man (DJ Set), Marsh, Swimming Paul, Annicka, Techno Tupac

The Do LaB Weekend 2: Mau P, TOKiMONSTA, The Hellp, Ivy Lab DnB b2b Kasra, ChaseWest, MPH, Rohaan, Linska, SHIMA, Athena

Heineken House Weekend 1: Digitalism, AFROJACK, Badger, Wuki, Mojave Grey, ANATTA

Heineken House Weekend 2: Chevelle, AFROJACK, Badger, Wuki, Mojave Grey, ANATTA

Dropped acts: GEL

=== 2026 ===
The 2026 festival was organized from April 10–12 and 17–19 featuring Sabrina Carpenter, Justin Bieber, KAROL G and Anyma presents Æden as the headlining acts.

==== Thursday, April 9 & 16 ====
Desert Sky Weekend 1: Disco Lines

Desert Sky Weekend 2: Kettama x Prospa x Josh Baker

==== Friday, April 10 & 17 ====
Coachella Stage	Outdoor Theatre	Sonora	Gobi	Mojave	Sahara	Yuma	Quasar
**Anyma** (W2); **Sabrina Carpenter**; The xx; Teddy Swims; Record Safari (W1); Jaqck Glam (W2)	Disclosure; Turnstile; Dijon; Lykke Li; Dabeull; Tiffany Tyson (W1); Jeremiah Red (W2)	Not For Radio (W1); Hot Mulligan; Cachirula & Loojan; Ninajirachi; The Two Lips; Fleshwater; Wednesday; Carolina Durante; Febuary; Doom Dave (W1); Jim Smith (W2)	Creepy Nuts; Joost; Holly Humberstone; fakemink; CMAT; Joyce Manor; NewDad; Bob Baker Marionettes; Cahuilla Bird Singers and Dancers	Blood Orange; Ethel Cain; Moby; Devo; Central Cee; BINI; Slayyyter; Novasoul (W1); El Ethos (W2)	Sexyy Red; Swae Lee; Levity; KATSEYE; Marlon Hoffstadt; HUGEL; Youna; MASSIO (W1); Bad Gal Gali (W2)	Gordo; Max Styler; Max Dean x Luke Dean; Prospa; Kettama; Rossi. x Chloé Caillet; Groove Armada; Arodes; Jessica Brankka; Sahar Z	PAWSA (W1); Deep Dish (W1); Tiga (W1); Armin van Buuren x Adam Beyer (W2); Franky Rizardo (W2); Darco (W2)

The Do LaB Weekend 1: jigitz, John Summit, Effin, Jazzy, MCR-T, Bullet Tooth, 1tbsp, Fifi, Soraya

The Do LaB Weekend 2: GRiZ, Sub Focus, LYNY, Level Up b2b Mary Droppinz, ÆON:MODE b2b Blossom, SBTRKT, The Brothers Macklovitch (A-Trak & Dave1), ALISHA, Sam Alfred, Arthi, Patricio

Heineken House Weekend 1: Zerb, Wale, Robin Schulz, Kryptogram

Heineken House Weekend 2: Zerb, Wale, Robin Schulz, Kryptogram, Sander Kleinenberg

The Bunker: Radiohead Motion Picture House: Kid A Mnesia

Dropped acts: Anyma (Weekend 1)

==== Saturday, April 11 & 18 ====
Coachella Stage	Outdoor Theatre	Sonora	Gobi	Mojave	Sahara	Yuma	Quasar
**Justin Bieber**; The Strokes; GIVĒON; Addison Rae; Jaqck Glam (W1); Record Safari (W2)	David Byrne; Labrinth; SOMBR; Alex G; Los Hermanos Flores; Blondshell	Mind Enterprises; 54 Ultra; rusowsky; Ceremony; Ecca Vandal; Freak Slug; Die Spitz; Triste Juventud (W1); Buster Jarvis (W2)	Morat; BIA; Davido; Geese; Luísa Sonza; WHATMORE; Noga Erez	Interpol; PinkPantheress; Taemin; Royel Otis; Fujii Kaze; Jack White (W1); Kacey Musgraves (W2)	Worship; Adriatique; REZZ (W1); Nine Inch Noize; ¥ØU$UK€ ¥UK1MAT$U; Hamdi; ZULAN; TEED; Seek-One (W1); Fundido (W2)	Armin van Buuren x Adam Beyer; Boys Noize; Bedouin; SOSA; Ben Sterling; Mahmut Orhan; Riordan; GENESI; Yamagucci	David Guetta (W1); Afrojack x Shimza (W1); Joezi (W1); DJ Snake x Knock2 (W2); DJ Snake x RL Grime x Flosstradamus (W2); Madeon (W2); Devault (W2)

The Do LaB Weekend 1: Prospa b2b Josh Baker, Kettama b2b ¥ØU$UK€ ¥UK1MAT$U, Anfisa Letyago, andhim, Romy (DJ Set), Tinashe (DJ Set), Starjunk 95, Baby J, Roddy Lima, Baalti, Lumia

The Do LaB Weekend 2: Ben Sterling b2b Max Dean, AFTER MIDNIGHT (Matroda x San Pacho), Seth Troxler, GUDFELLA, Ape Drums b2b Bontan, DJ Habibeats b2b Zainab, Sarz, Eliza Rose, Champion, Sam Binga b2b Jialing, STRAWBRY

Heineken House Weekend 1: Andruss, Sean Paul, Coi Leray, Joshwa, NIIKO X SWAE, REDKĒ

Heineken House Weekend 1: Andruss, Big Boi, Coi Leray, Joshwa, NIIKO X SWAE, REDKĒ

The Bunker: Radiohead Motion Picture House: Kid A Mnesia

Dropped acts: Solomun, REZZ (Weekend 2), Lambrini Girls

==== Sunday, April 12 & 19 ====
Coachella Stage	Outdoor Theatre	Sonora	Gobi	Mojave	Sahara	Yuma	Quasar
**KAROL G**; Young Thug; Major Lazer; Wet Leg; Tijuana Panthers; Gabe Real	BIGBANG; Laufey; Foster the People; CLIPSE; Gigi Perez; Juicewon	French Police; DRAIN; RØZ; Los Retros; Jane Remover; Model/Actriz; Glitterer; Panda & Chok (W1); Bulletballet (W2)	The Rapture; TOMORA; Black Flag; Oklou; COBRAH; The Chats; flowerovlove	FKA twigs; Iggy Pop; Suicidal Tendencies; Little Simz; Samia; wydleflower (W1); Megatone (W2)	Kaskade; Subtronics; Mochakk; Duke Dumont; BUNT.; Girl Math (VNSSA x NALA); LOBOMAN (W1); GINGEE (W2)	Green Velvet x AYYBO; WhoMadeWho; Röyksopp; Carlita x Josh Baker; MËSTIZA; &friends; AZZECCA; LE YORA	Fatboy Slim (W1); JOY (Anonymous) (W1); Jazzy (W1); Sara Landry's Blood Oath (W2); LP Giobbi (W2); Linska (W2)

The Do LaB Weekend 1: Anyma b2b Marlon Hoffstadt, Whethan, OMNOM, Omar+, Deer Jade, Isaiah Rashad, Poolside's Daytime Disco, Brunello, Jackie Hollander, Cincity, Soul Purpose

The Do LaB Weekend 2: Hamdi b2b Riordan, X Club., Adriatique b2b Cloonee, Maxi Meraki, Natascha Polké, DRAMA (DJ Set), Silva Bumpa, Alex Chapman b2b Zoe Gitter, Neumonic, CQUESTT

Heineken House Weekend 1 & 2: nimino, Motion City Soundtrack, Less Than Jake, oskar med k, Mild Minds

The Bunker: Radiohead Motion Picture House: Kid A Mnesia
