= Urb (magazine) =

American music, and urban lifestyle and culture magazine

- End of 2005 issue cover
- Categories: Music, Urban Culture
- Frequency: Monthly
- Publisher: Raymond Leon Roker
- First issue: December 1990
- Final issue Number: Summer 2009; 158
- Country: US
- Based in: West Hollywood, California
- Language: English
- Website: www.urb.com
- ISSN: 1081-9924

Urb was a monthly American magazine devoted to electronic music, hip-hop and urban lifestyle and culture. Based in Los Angeles, California, the magazine was founded in 1990 by Raymond Roker.

== Description ==
Based in Los Angeles, California, the magazine was founded in 1990 by Raymond Roker. One issue a year was devoted to features of "The Next 100" up-and-coming musicians.

Urb's online presence, Urb.com, was minimal until a redesigned site was launched on April 2, 2007. The new 2007 version of Urb.com featured a daily music and culture news blog, weekly CD and singles reviews, features from the magazine, and an extensive video collection made possible by a partnership with the online video service Video In My Backyard.

In April 2007, "The Next 100" feature was moved to the magazine's website and expanded tenfold to become "The Next 1000". Instead of featuring 100 emerging artists and groups in a single issue of the magazine, 20 artists and groups are featured each week on the website, over the course of a year. The artists to be featured are selected by URB's editorial staff and are rated by the site's visitors.

Publication of the print edition was suspended following the Summer 2009 issue (No. 158). Plans were announced for the October 2009 launch of issue No. 159 as an online publication, with further issues to follow, with the hope that the print edition would be resumed sometime in 2010. Roker cited a significant "shift in consumption and media habits worldwide, especially in the magazine market" in the preceding 18 months as a factor in the decision to put the print edition on hiatus.
