= Inner Wave =

American pop musical group

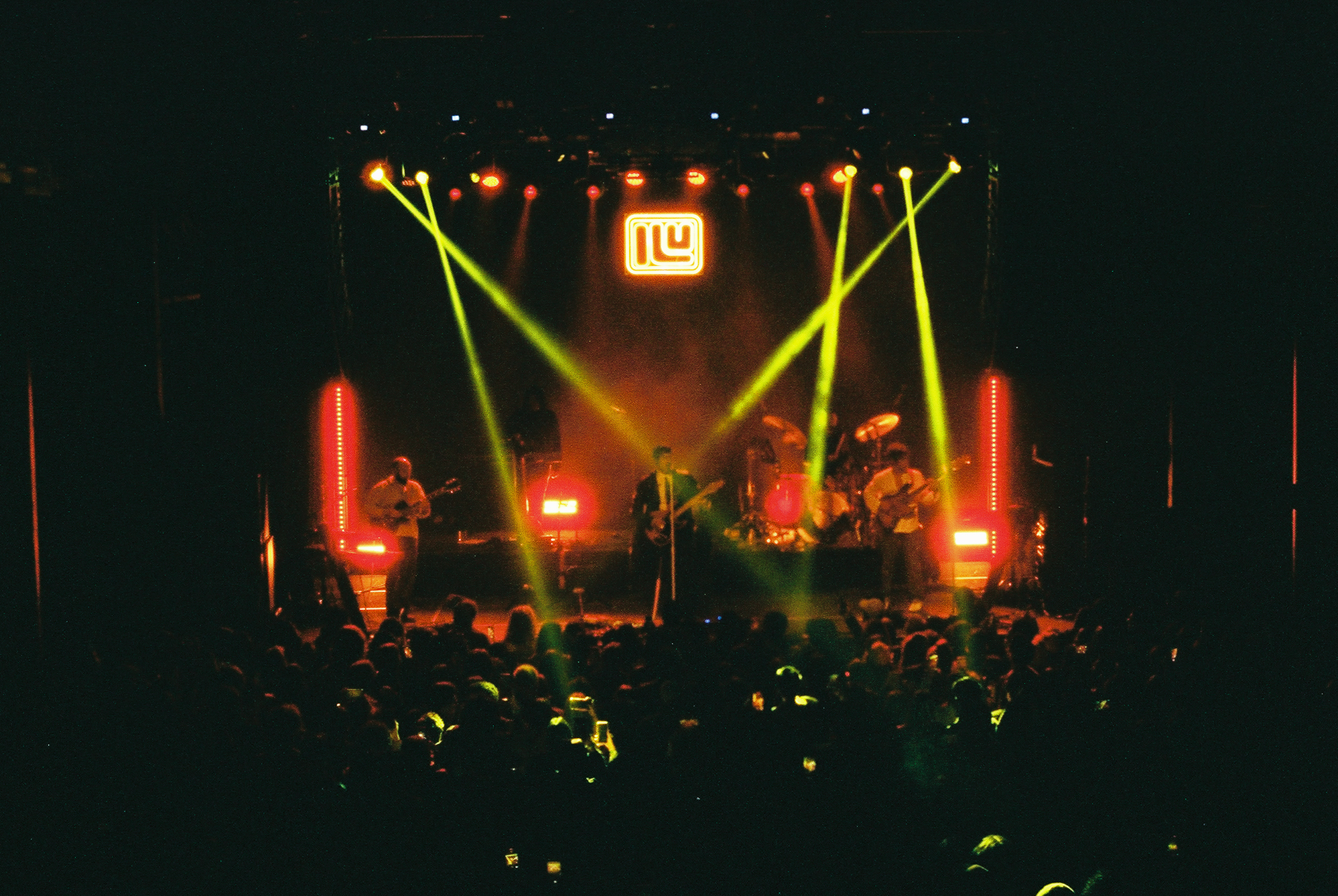
- Jukebox Tour (2023)

Background information
- Origin: Gardena, California
- Genres: Indie pop · Psychedelic pop · Indie rock · Synth-pop · Psychedelic rock
- Years active: 2006–present
- Members: Pablo Sotelo; Jean Pierre Narvaez; Elijah Trujillo; Luis Portillo; Jose Cruz; Chris Runners

Inner Wave is an alternative indie-pop band from Los Angeles, California. They are known for their blend of psychedelic and synthwave sounds weaving in indie rock elements, jazz chords, Latin beats, and smooth vocals. Pablo Sotelo is the lead vocalist and guitarist with Jean Pierre Narvaez on the bass and Elijah Trujillo on the guitar. Sotelo, Narvaez, and Trujillo, the founding members of the band, are now joined by drummer Luis Portillo and sound engineer and keyboardist Jose Cruz.

== History ==
Founding members, Pablo Sotelo, Jean Pierre Narvaez, and Elijah Trujillo grew up together in Gardena, California. The childhood friends began playing and making music in their teens in their converted garage recording studio they call The Swamp. The band originally started as a Christian rock band. Their style later evolved into the indie-rock genre. Exploring psych-pop and synthwave, the trio has been making music together for 15 years. In the process, Luis Portillo joined as drummer in 2017 and Jose Cruz as keyboardist and sound engineer in 2020.

The band self-released a series of EPs which then led to their first album, III in 2013. They found success in the mid-2010s, with their hit records “American Spirits” from the 2013 album III and “Eclipse” from Underwater Pipe Dreams released in 2017. Inner Wave returned with a concert album, Live At the Fonda, Los Angeles, 2019. In 2021, their fourth studio album, Apoptosis, materialized, leading them to headline their first North American Tour in 2022. In the same year, Inner Wave opened for Boy Pablo's European Tour and performed at Coachella, Outside Lands Music and Arts Festival, Pickathon, and Desert Daze. From October to December 2022, the band was on tour with FOALS on their Life Is Yours Tour, performing in venues like the Hollywood Palladium in Los Angeles and Terminal 5 in New York. In 2023, the band went back on the road for their headline tour, the Jukebox Tour, playing hometown shows at The Novo in Los Angeles and the Fox Theater in Pomona.

== Influences ==
Inner Wave has stated their influences include The Strokes, Arctic Monkeys, Nirvana, The Doors, Gorillaz, Marvin Gaye, Tame Impala, and the film Blade Runner in which much of their music references. Sotelo stated that the aesthetic of sci-fi films influences their process.

== Personnel ==
Members

- Pablo Sotelo – lead vocals, guitar
- Jean Pierre Narvaez - bass, vocals
- Elijah Trujillo - guitar, keyboards
- Luis Portillo - drums
- Jose Cruz - keyboards

== Discography ==
=== Studio albums ===
- III (2013)
- Sun Transmission (2014)
- Underwater Pipe Dreams (2017)
- Apoptosis (2021)
- See You When I Get Back (2026)

=== Live albums ===
- Live At the Fonda, Los Angeles, 2019 (2020)

=== Collaborative albums ===
- Apoptosis Remixes (2024) (Various artists)

=== Extended plays ===
- Blacklight (2014)
- Underwater + (2018)
- wya (2019)
- wyd (2020)

=== Singles ===
- Lullaby (2019)
- Rose (2019)
- Baby ft. Jordana (2023)
- MADRE (2025)
