= R & R Studios =

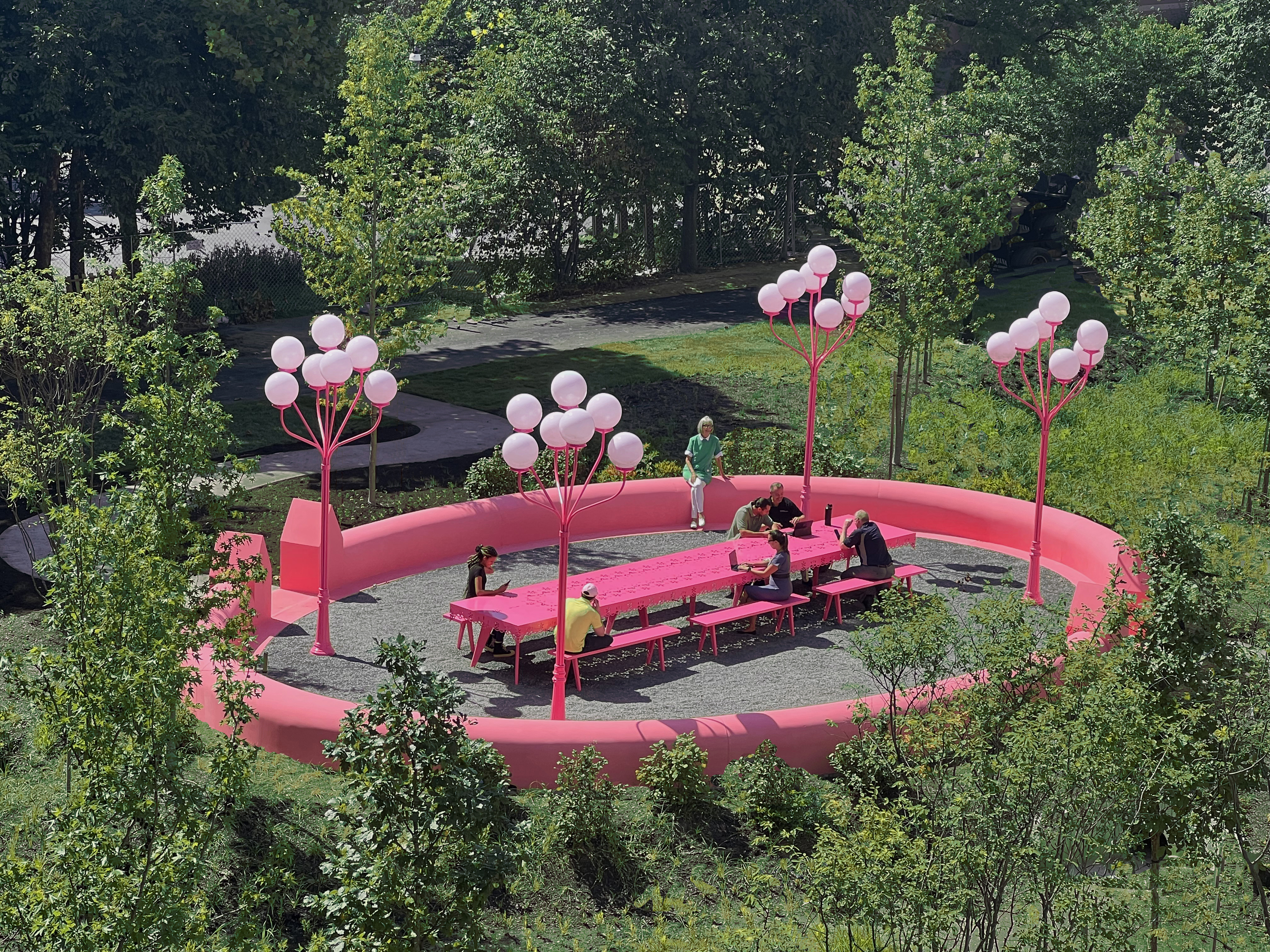
"The Home We Share" (Forget-Me-Nor), Princeton University, New Jersey.

R&R Studios is a Miami-based design collective established by architects and artists Roberto Behar and Rosario Marquardt.

== Architecture and Art ==
Among their works are "M", "The Living Room", "Besame Mucho", and "The Home We Share".

== Biography ==
The founders of the studio, Roberto Behar and Rosario Marquardt, were born in Argentina and have known one another since the age of twelve. Behar and Marquardt received their diplomas in architecture together from the Universidad Nacional de Rosario in Argentina. Behar also completed postgraduate study at the Institute for Architecture and Urban Studies in New York City, was a visiting artist at the Getty Research Institute in Los Angeles, and received a visiting artist fellowship from the American Academy in Rome. They have taught, lectured, and served as visiting critics at major universities, including Harvard GSD, Yale University, Cornell University, Universita IUAV di Venezia, Ecole Polytechnique Federal de Lausanne, and the University of Maryland. Behar and Marquardt both currently teach at the University of Miami School of Architecture.

== Projects ==
Name	Country	State	City
The Living Room	United States of America	Florida	Miami Design District
A Midsummer Night's Dream	United States of America	Florida	Coral Gables
I Love You (Concept)	United States of America	Florida	Miami Design District
Supernova	United States of America	California	Indio
Museum of Art Fort Lauderdale	United States of America	Florida	Ft. Lauderdale
Roosevelt Station Plaza and Sculpture	United States of America	Washington	Seattle
All Together Now	United States of America	Colorado	Denver
Flowers & Flowers	United States of America	Florida	Miami Beach
Peace & Love	United States of America	Florida	Parkland
The Peace Project	United States of America	Colorado	Denver
Valby Square and Town Center	Denmark		Copenhagen
M	United States of America	Florida	Miami
Opa-Locka Open Room	United States of America	Florida	Opa-Locka
Beauty for All (Concept)	United States of America	Florida	Miami
Flower Power Flag	United States of America	Florida	Miami
Biblioteca Central	Argentina		Rosario
Plaza Israel	Argentina		Buenos Aires
Nordhavnen Sustainable City	Denmark		Copenhagen
The Star of Miami	United States of America	Florida	Miami
Rhode Island Intermodal Station	United States of America	Rhode Island	Warwick
Besame Mucho	United States of America	California	Indio
Darsena Norte (Concept)	Argentina		Buenos Aires
Oracabessa	Jamaica		Oracabessa
The Absent City	United States of America	Wisconsin	Madison
Cruaute Et Utopie	Belgium		Brussels
A Place in the World	United States of America	Florida	Miami
Coquina Pool	United States of America	Florida	Rosemary Beach
I Love You, A Travelling Square	United States of America	Virginia	Alexandria
The Sky Above Us	United States of America	Florida	Miami
Church of Guadalupe	United States of America	Indiana	Milford
University of Miami Entrance Plaza	United States of America	Florida	Coral Gables
Instant Happiness	Argentina		Buenos Aires
Building Blocks	United States of America	Puerto Rico	San Juan
Los Pasos Perdidos	Belgium		Brussels
Bicentennial Monument and Square	Mexico		Mexico City
The Dreaming Room	United States of America	New Jersey	Princeton
Flower Fields Forever	United States of America	New Jersey	Princeton
Forget Me Not	United States of America	New Jersey	Princeton

== Exhibitions ==
- Time of Friendship. Museum of Art. Fort Lauderdale. Fort Lauderdale, Florida.
- The Absent City. Museum of Contemporary Art. Madison, Wisconsin. (Individual Exhibition).
- The Peace Project. Museum of Contemporary Art Denver, Colorado. (Individual Exhibition).
- Centre International pour la Ville, l’Architecture et le Paysage. Brussels, Belgium.

== Publications ==
- Roberto Behar and Rosario Marquardt. R&R Studios. The Little Book. Miami, Florida: 2015.
- Roberto Behar and Rosario Marquardt. R&R Studios. R&R Alphabet. Miami, Florida: 2015.
- Roberto Behar and Rosario Marquardt. R&R Studios. The Living Room. Miami, Florida: 2013.
- Roberto Behar and Rosario Marquardt. R&R Studios. Museum Works. Miami, Florida: 2013.
- Roberto Behar and Rosario Marquardt. R&R Studios. M. Miami, Florida: 2011.
- Roberto Behar and Rosario Marquardt. R&R Studios. The Peace Project. Miami, Florida: 2007.
- Roberto Behar and Rosario Marquardt. R&R Studios. Here Comes the Sun. Miami, Florida: 2003.
- Roberto Behar The Architecture of Politics: 1910–1940. Miami, Florida: 1995.
