= Autograf =

American electronic dance music duo

- Origin: Chicago, Illinois, US
- Genre: Electronic dance music
- Years active: 2013–present
- Label: Armada
- Members: Louis Kha; Mikul Wing
- Past members: Jake Carpenter
- Website: leaveyourautograf.com

Autograf is an American electronic dance music duo formed in Chicago in 2013. It is composed of Louis Kha and Mikul Wing, and previously, Jake Carpenter. They have performed at various music festivals, including Coachella and Lollapalooza. Their debut album, The Ace of You, was released by Armada Music in 2020. It was followed by Affirmations in 2023.

== Discography ==
- The Ace of You (2020)
- Affirmations (2023)
