= Mild Minds =

Australian born DJ and Producer

- Born: Benjamin David; Melbourne, Australia
- Genres: EDM
- Occupations: Disc jockey; Producer
- Years active: 2018–present
- Labels: Counter Records, Foreign Family
- Website: mildminds.com

Benjamin David known as Mild Minds, is an Australian-born DJ and Producer and creator of the Miami Horror. As of 2025, he is based in Los Angeles.

Mild Minds released his debut single "Swim" in 2018, followed by an EP of the same name in October 2018.

In 2020, the Luc Bradford remix of "Swim" was nominated for Grammy Award for Best Remixed Recording, Non-Classical at the Grammy Awards.

Also in 2020, the Colin Read directed video for his song "Walls" won Best Dance/Electronic Video - Newcomer at the 2020 UK Music Video Awards.

In 2025, the single "Formations" was certified gold in Australia.

== Discography ==
=== Albums ===
List of albums, with selected details
| Title | Details |
|---|---|
| Mood | Released: March 2020; Format: digital, LP; Label: Counter Records |
| Gemini | Released: February 2025; Format: digital, LP; Label: Foreign Family |

=== Extended plays ===
List of EPs, with selected details
| Title | Details |
|---|---|
| Swim | Released: October 2018; Format: digital, LP; Label: Foreign Family |
| It Won't Do | Released: September 2022; Format: digital; Label: Foreign Family |

=== Certified singles ===
List of charted and/or certified singles, with selected details
| Title | Year | Certifications | Album |
|---|---|---|---|
| "Formations" | 2020 | ARIA: Gold | Mood |

== See also ==
- Miami Horror
