= Gioli & Assia =

Italian DJ and producer

Giolì & Assia
- Born: Giorgia Lipari, Assia Nania
- Genres: Electronic; dance
- Occupations: DJ; record producer; musician; singer
- Years active: 2016–present
- Labels: Spinnin' Records, Insominac, Diesis
- Website: https://gioliandassia.com/

Giolì & Assia are an Italian female electro duo formed in 2016 in Palermo. The duo have performed at festivals including: Coachella, Hard Summer and CRSSD Festival.

== Career ==
The duo formed in 2016 after meeting on social media. Raised in a musical environment by her parents since childhood, Giolì (who took piano and guitar lessons) was taking her first steps in the music industry and was looking for a manager. This is how she met Assia, who was living in Cambridge, England at the time, via Facebook. After a few months, however, the nature of the duo changed to a regular partnership, both in the musical and private sphere, and the girls moved in together. At the same time, they also founded their own music label Diesis Records.

In 2017, the project debuted with the single "Stay Closer". Shortly afterwards, "Endless", "Paradise to Share" and "How Can I" were released. In March 2018, preceded by the single "Starry Nights", their debut album "Istantanee" was released. The debuted their album in India at the large music festival "TimeOut72" held in Goa.

In May 2018, Spinnin' Records released another single by the duo, "Something Special", which resulted in an invitation to play the Privilege club in Ibiza. The time spent in Ibiza inspired them to release another album, "Night Experience", in 2018.

Giolì & Assia launched the #DiesisLive project in April 2019, which consists of a live stream of performances, broadcast on YouTube and Facebook, mixing electronic music with traditional instruments and singing. The venues of the concerts include summit of the Vulcano volcano in the Aeolian Islands, the Andromeda Theater in the province of Agrigento and the Isola Delle Femmine in their hometown of Palermo, Italy. Another live session took place in December 2019, under the summit craters of Etna in Sicily.

== Musical style ==
The duo's musical style encompasses the genre 'Melodic Techno'. Giolì plays piano, cello, drums, guitar, and hang, while Assia handles vocals and guitar. Due to the fact that Assia is multilingual, the duo creates songs in English, Italian, French, and Spanish.

== Discography ==
=== Albums and Extended plays (EP) ===
- 2018 "Istantanee", Diesis Records
- 2018 "Night Experience", Diesis Records
- 2021 "Moon Faces EP", Diesis Records
- 2022 "Fire, Hell and Holy Water" Diesis Records
- 2024 "Resurrection (Act 1)", Diesis Records

=== Single ===
- 2017 "Stay Closer"
- 2017 "Endless"
- 2017 "Paradise to Share"
- 2017 "How Can I."
- 2018 "Something Special"
- 2019 "Starry Nights"
- 2019 "Feel Good"
- 2019 "Blame On Me"
- 2019 "Inside Your Head"
- 2019 "Blind"
- 2019 "Breathing"
- 2019 "Emptiness"
- 2021 "Lost"
- 2021 "Bebe"
- 2021 "How Many Lies"
- 2021 "Quedate"
- 2022 "Fire, Hell and Holy Water"
- 2022 "Silence"
- 2022 "I'll Be Fine"
- 2022 "Playing Chess"
- 2022 "Eurydice"
- 2022 "Even If The Time Will Pass By"
- 2023 "Young Forever"
- 2024 "The Point Of Living"
- 2024 "I Missed You Too"
- 2024 "Mine"
- 2024 "Around"
- 2024 "Magnetic Field"
- 2024 "Faded"
