= Raymond Roker =

Electronic music DJ and club promoter

Raymond Leon Roker is the global head of editorial at Amazon Music. He is of Bahamian and Ashkenazi descent.

Roker is a former (and part-time) electronic music DJ and club promoter. In the 1980s and 1990s he was a graffiti artist in Los Angeles, producing numerous murals around the city and doing commercial work for television and films. He co-founded Urb magazine in December 1990. Examples of his design work can be found in the collection of the Cooper Hewitt, Smithsonian Design Museum.
