= Ricoshëi =

American electronic music and production duo

- Origin: Los Angeles, California, United States
- Genres: Electronic, techno
- Years active: 2014-present
- Label: Pampa Records
- Members: Nikko Gibler; Jake Patrick
- Website: www.ricoshei.com

Ricoshëi are an electronic music and production duo consisting of Nikko Gibler and Jake Patrick Cohen, originally from Los Angeles, California.

== Musical career ==
Logo

Ricoshëi released their debut single "Perfect Like You" on Dj Koze's highly acclaimed imprint Pampa Records on Valentine's Day 2014. It came out as the A-side on a split record alongside German DJ and producer Dave DK's track, Woolloomooloo. In December 2014, they also released their debut EP entitled Ghosts. On 22 February 2016, they released their singles Fantasy and Tokubetsu. Furthermore, in April 2016, they featured on French DJ Jerry Bouthier's album Cafe Kitsuné with the track Darling, with vocals provided by Brighton-born singer Fiona Sally Miller.

Their music has continually been featured on the regular programming of globally recognized radio networks such as iHeartRadio's “The IndependentFM”, Los Angeles’ “KCRW”, Sirius Radio's “XMU” Channel 35, Toronto's “CHRY 105.5FM”, Italy's “RAI Radio2”, Ibiza-Sonica, Lebanon's NRJ 99.1 FM, Germany's Fritz Radio FM, Vienna's FM4 and in the UK on BBC Radio6. German music website, TRNDMUSIK named “Perfect Like You” their #1 song of 2014. Throughout the years, Ricoshëi's music and performances have been featured on magazines and media outlets such as Rolling Stone, Pitchfork, Mixmag, Ibiza-Voice and Spin Magazine.

In early 2015, they toured the United States and Canada with dance music heavyweight, Eric Prydz on a sold-out bus tour throughout 16 cities that included; Austin, Dallas, Denver, St.Louis, Baltimore, Toronto, Detroit, New York, Montreal, San Francisco, Los Angeles, El Paso, Houston, Washington D.C., Chicago and Columbus, Ohio.

Some of their highlight performances include Coachella, Lollapalooza, SXSW, Corona Capital, BPM Festival, Mysteryland and the inaugural Okeechobee Festival in central Florida during the spring of 2016. Later that same year they performed at Iceland's "Secret Solstice" Festival which takes place during the midnight-sun. After their show in Reykjavik, Ricoshëi went on to play shows in Germany, Italy and Switzerland.

On Valentine's Day 2017, and marking the 3 year anniversary of their debut single "Perfect Like You"; Ricoshëi released "If Ever" under their own imprint, "What's That?". It was premiered in Pete Tongs Essential Mix on BBC Radio 1. Later that same year, on June 16, 2017, Ricoshëi released their next single "Bruce Lee" to much critical acclaim from leading industry radio and club djs.

At Burning Man 2017, Ricoshëi performed live at Robot Heart's 10 Year Anniversary opening party. They also did a dj set at the #BigImagination #747 jet as well as on the Camp Epic Art Car.

Ricoshëi's music has been supported by:

The Magician, Paco Osuna, Agoria, Stacy Pullen, Joris Voorn, Wankelmut, Noir, Dennis Ferrer, Kristina Sky, Siopis, Way Out West, Hybrid Theory, Cassius, Animal Trainer, Andreas Henneberg, Roger Sanchez, Steve Lawler, Horsemeat Disco, Mark Knight, Darku J, Codes, Chordashian, Infected Mushroom, Pezzner, Lane 8, Andi Durrant (Kiss FM), Tomo Hirata (Block FM Japan), Adam Trace (Kiss FM), Ivo Solachki (Radio Nova / Bulgaria), John Digweed, Lars Behrenroth, Valida (KCRW / Los Angeles), Darcy Reenis, Steve Swift (Billboard 104.5 WSNX), Luca Donzelli (Amnesia Ibiza), Andrew Grant (Circoloco DC-10 Ibiza), Julio (Sheik 'n' Beik, NY).

== Discography ==
=== Albums ===
- Ghosts EP (2014)

=== Singles ===
- "Perfect Like You" (2014)
- "Darling feat. Fiona Sally Miller" (2015)
- "Fantasy" (2016)
- "Tokubetsu" (2016)
- "If Ever" (2017)
- "Bruce Lee" (2017)

=== Remixes ===
- Superlounge - "Ghost of Time f. Jinadu" (2015)
- Onür Ozman - "Left In Pain" (2016)
