= APRA Music Awards of 2002 =

Annual Australian music awards ceremony

- Date: 3 June 2002
- Location: Australia

The Australasian Performing Right Association Awards of 2002 (generally known as APRA Awards) are a series of awards which include the APRA Music Awards, Classical Music Awards, and Screen Music Awards. The APRA Music Awards were presented by APRA and the Australasian Mechanical Copyright Owners Society (AMCOS). The Classical Music Awards were distributed in July in Sydney. The Screen Music Awards were issued in November by APRA and Australian Guild of Screen Composers (AGSC). AGSC had provided their own awards ceremonies, from 1996 to 2000, with categories for film and TV composers: many were similar to the Screen Music Awards.

== Awards ==
Nominees and winners with results indicated on the right.

=== APRA Music Awards ===
Song of the Year
Title	Artist	Writer	Result
"Amazing"	Alex Lloyd	Alex Lloyd	Won
"Monsters"	Something for Kate	Paul Dempsey, Stephanie Ashworth, Clint Hyndman	Nominated
"On a Bad Day"	Kasey Chambers	Kasey Chambers	Nominated
"Runaway Train"	Kasey Chambers	Kasey Chambers	Nominated
"Special Ones"	George	Katie Noonan, Nicholas Stewart	Nominated
Songwriters of the Year
Writer			Result
Kasey Chambers			Won
Breakthrough Songwriter
Writer			Result
Sia			Won
Jennifer Waite, Grant Wallis (see Aneiki)			Won
Ted Albert Award for Outstanding Services to Australian Music
Name			Result
Barry Chapman			Won
Most Performed Australian Work
Title	Artist	Writer	Result
"Hold Me"	Savage Garden	Darren Hayes, Daniel Jones	Won
"Just the Thing"	Paul Mac featuring Peta Morris	Paul Mac	Nominated
"Pleased to Meet You"	Aneiki	Jennifer Waite, Grant Wallis, Tommy Ekman, Christer Sandelin	Nominated
"Reminiscing"	Madison Avenue	Graeham Goble	Nominated
"Say You Do"	Invertigo	James Dingli, Vincent Dingli	Nominated
Most Performed Australian Work Overseas
Title	Artist	Writer	Result
"Crash and Burn"	Savage Garden	Darren Hayes, Daniel Jones	Won
Most Performed Country Work
Title	Artist	Writer	Result
"65 Roses"	Wolverines	Lee J Collie	Nominated
"Angel"	Gina Jeffreys	Rick Price, Gina Jeffreys	Won
"Good Things in Life"	Adam Brand	Graeme Connors, Adam Brand	Nominated
"On a Bad Day"	Kasey Chambers	Kasey Chambers	Nominated
"Runaway Train"	Kasey Chambers	Kasey Chambers, Steven Werchon	Nominated
Most Performed Dance Work
Title	Artist	Writer	Result
"Dust Me Selecta"	Gerling	Burke Reid, Darren Cross, Paul Towner, Valerie Johnson, George Johnson, Louis Johnson, Rodney Temperton	Nominated
"Just the Thing"	Paul Mac featuring Peta Morris	Paul Mac	Won
"Let It Ride"	Sgt Slick	Andrew Ramanauskas, Cheyne Coates, Marc Cerrone, Raymond Donnez	Nominated
"Precious Heart"	Tall Paul vs INXS	Paul Newman, Andrew Farriss, Michael Hutchence	Nominated
"The Sound of Breaking Up"	Paul Mac featuring Peta Morris	Paul Mac	Nominated
Most Performed Foreign Work
Title	Artist	Writer	Result
"Can't Fight the Moonlight"	LeAnn Rimes	Diane Warren	Won
"Dancing in the Moonlight"	Toploader	Sherman Kelly	Nominated
"I'm like a Bird"	Nelly Furtado	Nelly Furtado	Nominated
"Lovin' Each Day"	Ronan Keating	Gregg Alexander, Rick Nowels	Nominated
"Whole Again"	Atomic Kitten	George McCluskey, Stuart Kershaw, Bill Padley, Jem Godfrey	Nominated
Most Performed Jazz Work
Title	Artist	Writer	Result
Aether	The Necks	Chris Abrahams, Lloyd Swanton, Tony Buck	Won
"East St Kilda Toodle Oo"	Allan Browne	John Scurry	Nominated
"High Times"	The Catholics	David Brewer	Nominated
"Shadow Dancing"	Java Quartet	Michael Galeazzi	Nominated
"Smoke and Magnets"	Chris Abrahams	Chris Abrahams	Nominated
=== Classical Music Awards ===
Best Composition by an Australian Composer
Title		Composer	Result
Yuè Lìng Jié		Liza Lim	Won
Best Performance of an Australian Composition
Title	Composer	Performer	Result
Batavia	Richard Mills	Orchestra Victoria	Won
Distinguished Services to Australian Music
Artist or Organisation			Result
Richard Meale			Won
Instrumental Work of the Year
Title		Composer	Result
Piano Sonata No 1		Carl Vine	Won
Long-Term Contribution to the Advancement of Australian Music
Artist or Organisation			Result
Miriam Hyde			Won
Orchestral Work of the Year
Title		Composer	Result
Symphony No 3		Ross Edwards	Won
Most Distinguished Contribution to the Presentation of Australian Music by an Individual
Artist or Organisation			Result
Jeanell Carrigan			Won
Most Distinguished Contribution to the Presentation of Australian Music by an Organisation
Artist or Organisation			Result
ABC Radio National, ABC Classic FM			Won
Most Distinguished Contribution to the Advancement of Australian Music in Education
Organisation		Work	Result
Sydney Youth Orchestra		2001 Denmark and Sweden Tour	Won
Most Distinguished Contribution to the Advancement of Australian Music in a Regional Area
Organisation		Work	Result
Queensland Biennial Festival of Music		2001 presentation of Australian music in regional Queensland	Won
Vocal or Choral Work of the Year
Title		Composer	Result
Batavia		Richard Mills	Won
=== Screen Music Awards ===
Best Feature Film Score
Title		Composer	Result
The Bank		Alan John	Won
Best Music for an Advertisement
Title		Composer	Result
Visa "Dining Out"		Mark Rivett, Bruce Heald and Andrew Firth	Won
Best Music for Children's Television
Title		Composer	Result
Horace and Tina		Brett Rosenberg	Won
Hi-5 - "Opposites Attract"		Chris Harriott, Chris Phillips, Lisa Hoppe	Nominated
Hi-5 - Songlets		Chris Harriott, various	Nominated
Best Music for a Documentary
Title		Composer	Result
The Creepy Crawleys		Cliff Bradley	Won
Best Music for a Short Film
Title		Composer	Result
No Surrender		Michael Yezerski	Won
Best Music for a Television Series or Serial
Series or Serial		Composer	Result
Farscape		Guy Gross	Won
Best Original Song Composed for a Feature Film, Telemovie, TV Series or Mini-Series
Song title	Work	Composer	Result
"Far Away Home"	The Tracker	Graham Tardif, Rolf de Heer	Won
Best Soundtrack Album
Title		Composer	Result
One Night the Moon		Mairead Hannan, Paul Kelly, Kev Carmody, John Romeril, Deidre Hannan, Alice Garner	Won
Best Television Theme
Title		Composer	Result
On the Beach		Christopher Gordon	Won
International Achievement Award
Artist			Result
David Hirschfelder			Won

== See also ==
- Music of Australia
