= AIR Awards of 2017 =

Annual Australian music awards ceremony

- Date: 27 July 2017
- Venue: Queen's Theatre, Adelaide Australia
- Hosted by: Dylan Lewis

Highlights
- Most wins: A.B. Original (5)
- Most nominations: A.B. Original (5)
- Website: https://air.org.au/air-awards/

The AIR Awards of 2017 is the eleventh annual Australian Independent Record Labels Association Music Awards (generally known as the AIR Awards) and was an award ceremony at Queen's Theatre Adelaide, Australia on 27 July 2017. This is the first time the event was held in South Australia.

There were no awards in 2016, due to the move in the eligibility dates for the AIR Awards to align with the calendar year. The 2017 awards saw a slightly longer eligibility period than usual with members' releases period between 1 August 2015 and 31 December 2016.

AIR General manager, Maria Amato commented "It was great to see the Industry turn out in droves to celebrate the success of the Independent sector at the 11th AIR Awards in Adelaide. So proud of the collaborations with the South Australian Government and our supporting partners that helped us make this all happen."

== Performers ==
- A.B. Original
- Ngaiire
- Henry Wagons
- Russell Morris
- Elizabeth Rose

== Nominees and winners ==
=== AIR Awards ===
Winners are listed first and highlighted in boldface; other final nominees are listed alphabetically.

Best Independent Artist	Best Independent Album
**A.B. Original**; Alex Lahey; Ali Barter; D.D Dumbo; Flume	**A.B. Original – Reclaim Australia**; Alex Lahey – B-Grade University; Big Scary – Animal; D.D Dumbo – Utopia Defeated; Ngaiire – Blastomia
Best Independent Single or EP	Breakthrough Independent Artist of the Year
**A.B. Original featuring Dan Sultan – "January 26"**; Alex Lahey – "You Don't Think You Like People Like Me"; Big Scary – "The Opposite of Us"; D.D Dumbo – "Satan"; Flume featuring Kai – "Never Be Like You"	**A.B. Original**; Alex Lahey; Camp Cope; D.D Dumbo; Julia Jacklin
Best Independent Blues and Roots Album	Best Independent Classical Album
**Julia Jacklin – Don't Let the Kids Win**; Archie Roach – Let Love Rule; Russell Morris – Red Dirt – Red Heart; The Waifs – Beautiful You; The Wilson Pickers – You Can't Catch a Fish from a Train	**Slava Grigoryan – Bach Cello Suites Vol 1**; Australian Brandenburg Orchestra – Brandenburg Celebrates; Australian Chamber Orchestra and Richard Tognetti – Mozart's Last Symphonies; Genevieve Lacey and James Crabb – Heard This and Thought of You
Best Independent Country Album	Best Independent Dance/Electronica Album
**Henry Wagons – After What I Did Last Night**; Big Smoke – This is Golden; Bill Chambers – Cold Trail; Halfway – The Golden Halfway Record; William Crighton – William Crighton	**Friendships – Nullarbor 1988–1989**; Elizabeth Rose – Intra; Flume – Skin; Jagwar Ma – Every Now and Then; Rainbow Chan – Spacings
Best Independent Dance, Electronica or Club Single	Best Independent Hard Rock, Heavy or Punk Album
**Nick Murphy – "Stop Me (Stop You)"**; Flume featuring Kai – "Never Be Like You"; Starley – "Call on Me"	**Violent Soho – WACO**; Dead Letter Circus – Aesthesis; Hellions – Opera Oblivia; Luca Brasi – If This Is All We're Going to Be; Twelve Foot Ninja – Outlier
Best Independent Hip Hop Album	Best Independent Jazz Album
**A.B. Original – Reclaim Australia**; L-Fresh the Lion – Become; Remi – Divas and Demons; Hau – The No End Theory; Milwaukee Banks – Deep into the Night	**James Morrison and Don Burrows – In Good Company**; Ben Winkleman Trio – The Knife; Keller Murphy Browne – Killers; Vince Jones and Paul Grabowsky – Provanance
Best Independent Label
**Pieater**; Barely Dressed Records; Elefant Traks; UNFD; Jazzhead, I OH YOU!

== See also ==
- Music of Australia
