= Triple J's Hottest 100 of 1994 =

1994 song ranking by Australian popular vote

1994 Triple J Hottest 100

Countdown details
- Date of countdown: January 1995

Countdown highlights
- Winning song: The Cranberries "Zombie"
- Most entries: Soundgarden (4 tracks)

Chronology
← Previous; 1993	Next → 1995

The 1994 Triple J Hottest 100, counted down in January 1995, was the second annual countdown of the most popular songs of the year, according to listeners of the Australian radio station Triple J. A compilation featuring 32 of the songs was released on cassette and CD. A countdown of the music videos of most of the songs was also shown on the ABC music program Rage.

Listeners could vote for one song at a time by phone (charged at 50 cents per call) and were allowed to vote as many times as they wanted. Listeners could select songs from a voting list provided by Triple J, or nominate a song of their choosing if it was not on the shortlist.

== Full list ==
Note: Australian artists

#	Song	Artist	Country of origin
1	Zombie	The Cranberries	Ireland
2	Closer	Nine Inch Nails	United States
3	Self Esteem	The Offspring	United States
4	Come Out and Play	The Offspring	United States
5	Tomorrow	Silverchair	Australia
6	Seether	Veruca Salt	United States
7	About a Girl (MTV Unplugged)	Nirvana	United States
8	Coma	Max Sharam	Australia
9	If I Only Knew	Tom Jones	United Kingdom
10	Dead Eyes Opened (Remix)	Severed Heads	Australia
11	Do You Love Me?	Nick Cave & the Bad Seeds	Australia
12	Laid	James	United Kingdom
13	Bug Powder Dust	Bomb the Bass featuring Justin Warfield	United Kingdom/United States
14	Better Get a Lawyer	The Cruel Sea	Australia
15	All I Wanna Do	Sheryl Crow	United States
16	Sabotage	Beastie Boys	United States
17	Interstate Love Song	Stone Temple Pilots	United States
18	Longview	Green Day	United States
19	Losin' It	Underground Lovers	Australia
20	Time Bomb	Barker	Australia
21	Sweetness and Light	Itch-E & Scratch-E	Australia
22	Black Hole Sun	Soundgarden	United States
23	Berlin Chair	You Am I	Australia
24	Basket Case	Green Day	United States
25	Today	The Smashing Pumpkins	United States
26	7 Seconds	Youssou N'Dour and Neneh Cherry	Senegal/Sweden
27	I Alone	Live	United States
28	Doll Parts	Hole	United States
29	Beercan	Beck	United States
30	Confide in Me	Kylie Minogue	Australia
31	Fall	Single Gun Theory	Australia
32	Fade into You	Mazzy Star	United States
33	Supernova	Liz Phair	United States
34	Miss World	Hole	United States
35	Cornflake Girl	Tori Amos	United States
36	Spin the Black Circle	Pearl Jam	United States
37	Voodoo People	The Prodigy	United Kingdom
38	Atomic Electric	Rebecca's Empire	Australia
39	Mathar	Dave Pike Set	United States
40	Undone – The Sweater Song	Weezer	United States
41	Your Ghost	Kristin Hersh	United States
42	Absolutely Fabulous	Pet Shop Boys	United Kingdom
43	Monkey and the Turtle	Christine Anu	Australia
44	Swamp Thing	The Grid	United Kingdom
45	Loser	Beck	United States
46	My Wave	Soundgarden	United States
47	Einstein on the Beach (For an Eggman)	Counting Crows	United States
48	Mr. Jones	Counting Crows	United States
49	Amen (Testament remix)	Falling Joys	Australia
50	Daddy Long Legs	Tumbleweed	Australia
51	Spoonman	Soundgarden	United States
52	Lap It Up	Penny Flanagan & the New Moon	Australia
53	Fell on Black Days	Soundgarden	United States
54	Vasoline	Stone Temple Pilots	United States
55	La Di Doh	Ed Kuepper	Australia
56	Bizarre Love Triangle	Frente!	Australia
57	Burn	The Cure	United Kingdom
58	Everything's Cool	Pop Will Eat Itself	United Kingdom
59	Sometimes Always	The Jesus and Mary Chain	United Kingdom
60	Cut Your Hair	Pavement	United States
61	Hey Jealousy	Gin Blossoms	United States
62	Lemon Sparked	Pale	Australia
63	Parklife	Blur featuring Phil Daniels	United Kingdom
64	A Conspiracy	The Black Crowes	United States
65	Bull in the Heather	Sonic Youth	United States
66	Hobo Humpin' Slobo Babe	Whale	Sweden
67	Andres	L7	United States
68	Feel the Pain	Dinosaur Jr.	United States
69	Mmm Mmm Mmm Mmm	Crash Test Dummies	Canada
70	What's the Frequency, Kenneth?	R.E.M.	United States
71	Dropout	Urge Overkill	United States
72	Lucas with the Lid Off	Lucas	Denmark
73	Alone Like Me	The Sharp	Australia
74	Neighbourhood Freak	Swoop	Australia
75	You Got Me Floatin'	P.M. Dawn	United States
76	American Life in the Summertime	Francis Dunnery	United Kingdom
77	Jaimme's Got a Gal	You Am I	Australia
78	Low	Cracker	United States
79	I'm Gonna Release Your Soul	Dave Graney 'n' the Coral Snakes	Australia
80	No Excuses	Alice in Chains	United States
81	In the Neighbourhood	Sisters Underground	New Zealand
82	Piece of Crap	Neil Young and Crazy Horse	Canada/United States
83	Am I Wrong	Love Spit Love	United States
84	Saints	The Breeders	United States
85	Blues Music	G. Love & Special Sauce	United States
86	Thirsty Dog	Nick Cave & the Bad Seeds	Australia
87	The More You Ignore Me, the Closer I Get	Morrissey	United Kingdom
88	Purple Haze	The Cure	United Kingdom
89	Regulate	Warren G and Nate Dogg	United States
90	Dancing in the Moonlight	The Smashing Pumpkins	United States
91	Round Here	Counting Crows	United States
92	Shine	Collective Soul	United States
93	Wildflowers	Things of Stone and Wood	Australia
94	Gallows Pole	Page and Plant	United Kingdom
95	Masses Like Asses	Def FX	Australia
96	Girls & Boys (Pet Shop Boys Remix)	Blur	United Kingdom
97	Here Comes the Hotstepper	Ini Kamoze	Jamaica
98	A Certain Slant of Light	The Tea Party	Canada
99	Agolo	Angélique Kidjo	Benin
100	Stay (I Missed You)	Lisa Loeb & Nine Stories	United States

== Statistics ==
=== Artists with multiple entries ===
#	Artist	Tracks
4	Soundgarden	22, 46, 51, 53
3	Counting Crows	47, 48, 91
2	The Offspring	3, 4
2	Nick Cave and the Bad Seeds	11, 86
2	Tex Perkins (Note: Once with Nick Cave and the Bad Seeds (11), once with The Cruel Sea (14))	11, 14
2	Stone Temple Pilots	17, 54
2	Green Day	18, 24
2	You Am I	23, 77
2	The Smashing Pumpkins	25, 90
2	Hole	28, 34
2	Beck	29, 45
2	Hope Sandoval (Note: Once with Mazzy Star (32), and once with The Jesus and Mary Chain (59))	32, 59
2	Michael Stipe (Note: Once with Kristin Hersh (41), and once with R.E.M. (70))	41, 70
2	Pet Shop Boys (Note: Once as a lead artist (42), and one remix (96))	42, 96
2	The Cure	57, 88
2	Blur	63, 96

=== Countries represented ===
Country	Total
United States	50
Australia	26
United Kingdom	15
Canada	3
Sweden	2
Benin	1
Denmark	1
Ireland	1
Jamaica	1
New Zealand	1
Senegal	1

=== Records ===
- Dolores O'Riordan, lead vocalist of The Cranberries, is the first woman to win the Hottest 100.
  - As of 2024, The Cranberries are the only Irish band to have won the Hottest 100. They would remain the only artist to have won the Hottest 100 who was not from Australia, United Kingdom or the United States, until Kimbra's victory with Gotye in 2011.
- Soundgarden's four entries were the most by an artist in a single countdown.
- At No. 5 "Tomorrow" by Silverchair became the highest ranked song by an Australian artist in an annual countdown.
- Angélique Kidjo, Youssou N'Dour and Lucas are the first artists from Benin, Senegal and Denmark to appear in the Hottest 100.
- Having placed at No. 3 and 4, The Offspring set the record for the highest consecutive appearances in the Hottest 100. This would later be equalled 29 years later by Dom Dolla in 2023. Similarly Counting Crows were the first artist to have back to back entries in an annual countdown. Their songs "Mr. Jones" & "Einstein on the Beach (For an Eggman)" came in at No. 47 and 48 respectively.
  - The Offspring are also the first artist to feature twice in the Top 5 (and Top 10) in an annual countdown.
- The United States contributed a record 49 entries to the 1994 countdown.

== CD release ==
Triple J Hottest 100 2

Compilation album by Various artists
- Released: 24 July 1995; 31 May 2004 (Reissue)
- Genre: Alternative
- Labels: Triple J, ABC Music, EMI; Warner Music (Reissue)

There have been three versions of this compilation album. The original version's track listing is listed below, and has been discontinued by manufacturer. The second version was a reissue by Universal released shortly after the original release. It features the same track listing as the original print. Strangely enough, the catalogue number corresponds with 2004 releases, the year when Universal began reissuing Hottest 100 CDs, despite this being released in 1995. The third version was released in 2004, this time by Warner Music. The track listing is different from the previous releases. "Closer" and "Seether" have been removed, and "A Certain Slant of Light" was moved up to track 2 on Disc 1.

Despite being released under Nick Cave and the Bad Seeds, "Do You Love Me?" is listed as just Nick Cave.

=== Disc 1 ===
No.	Title	Artists	Length
1.	"Closer" (2)	Nine Inch Nails	6:13
2.	"Tomorrow" (5)	Silverchair	4:24
3.	"Seether" (6)	Veruca Salt	3:19
4.	"Coma" (8)	Max Sharam	3:46
5.	"Dead Eyes Opened (Remix)" (10)	Severed Heads	3:51
6.	"Do You Love Me?" (11)	Nick Cave	5:57
7.	"Laid" (12)	James	2:36
8.	"Longview" (18)	Green Day	3:56
9.	"Losin' It" (19)	Underground Lovers	4:57
10.	"Time Bomb" (20)	Nick Barker	4:56
11.	"Sweetness and Light" (21)	Itch-E and Scratch-E	4:02
12.	"Berlin Chair" (23)	You Am I	2:34
13.	"Today" (25)	The Smashing Pumpkins	3:19
14.	"Confide in Me" (30)	Kylie Minogue	5:51
15.	"Fall" (31)	Single Gun Theory	4:17
16.	"Fade into You" (32)	Mazzy Star	4:52

=== Disc 2 ===
No.	Title	Artists	Length
1.	"Cornflake Girl" (35)	Tori Amos	5:06
2.	"Voodoo People" (37)	The Prodigy	3:20
3.	"Atomic Electric" (38)	Rebecca's Empire	4:06
4.	"Mathar" (39)	Dave Pike Set	3:40
5.	"Your Ghost" (41)	Kristin Hersh	3:17
6.	"Absolutely Fabulous" (42)	Pet Shop Boys	3:44
7.	"Monkey and the Turtle" (43)	Christine Anu	3:25
8.	"Swamp Thing" (44)	The Grid	3:56
9.	"Amen (Remix)" (49)	Falling Joys	4:04
10.	"Daddy Long Legs" (50)	Tumbleweed	4:00
11.	"Lap It Up" (52)	Penny Flanagan	3:25
12.	"La Di Doh" (55)	Ed Kuepper	4:52
13.	"Andres" (67)	L7	3:07
14.	"Bizarre Love Triangle" (56)	Frente!	2:01
15.	"Feel the Pain" (68)	Dinosaur Jr.	4:18
16.	"A Certain Slant of Light" (98)	The Tea Party	5:00

=== Certifications ===
Region	Certification	Certified units/sales
Australia (ARIA)	Platinum	70,000^{^}
^{^} Shipments figures based on certification alone.

== See also ==
- 1994 in music
