= Even When I'm Sleeping =

1997 single by Leonardo's Bride

Single by Leonardo's Bride

from the album Angel Blood
- Released: 13 April 1997
- Recorded: 1996
- Length: 3:55
- Label: Mushroom
- Songwriter: Dean Manning
- Producer: Justin Stanley

Leonardo's Bride singles chronology
"So Brand New" (1996)	"Even When I'm Sleeping" (1997)	"Buddha Baby" (1997)

"Even When I'm Sleeping" is a song by Australian band Leonardo's Bride that was the second single from their first studio album, Angel Blood. Released on 13 April 1997, "Even When I'm Sleeping" peaked at No. 4 on the Australian Recording Industry Association (ARIA) Singles Chart in July 1997 and was certified gold.

In May 2001 "Even When I'm Sleeping", written by guitarist-keyboardist, Dean Manning, was selected by Australasian Performing Right Association (APRA) as one of the Top 30 Australian songs of all time.

== Background ==
Leonardo's Bride formed in 1989, when Abby Dobson and Dean Manning performed together at an open mike night at the Crossroads Theatre in Sydney. Dobson and Manning travelled around Europe and America busking and playing in clubs and bars. In 1992, the band had its first performance in Sydney with a new line-up, consisting of Dobson on vocals, Manning on guitar, bouzouki and vocals, Alex Hewetson on double bass and Antero Ceschin on drums. They released their first EP in 1993 entitled Leonardo's Bride. In 1994, Patrick Hyndes and Jon Howell joined; they released a second EP in 1995 titled Temperamental Friend.

In 1996, Leonardo's Bride recorded their debut album, Angel Blood, and released the album's first single "So Brand New" in October 1996. The second single, "Even When I'm Sleeping", saw commercial success for the band, which peaked at No. 4 on the ARIA Singles Chart and No. 34 on the Recording Industry Association of New Zealand (RIANZ) Singles Charts. The single was certified gold by the Australian Recording Industry Association. "Even When I'm Sleeping" was nominated for 'Single of the Year' at the ARIA Music Awards of 1997. The song also went on to win 'Song of the Year' at the Australasian Performing Right Association (APRA) Music Awards of 1998 for Manning's song writing.

It has subsequently been covered by a dozen artists internationally including a French version that was a hit for Véronic DiCaire in Canada. It was also featured on Australian pop singer John Farnham's 2005 covers album – I Remember When I Was Young.

== Track listing ==
Australian CD single

1. "Even When I'm Sleeping" (Dean Manning) – 3:55
2. "Break" (Patrick Wong) – 3:21
3. "Stay" (Three Cheese Mix) – 3:27

== Personnel ==
Leonardo's Bride members

- Abby Dobson – lead vocal, acoustic guitar
- Jon Howell – drums
- Dean Manning – electric guitar, piano, wurlitzer, hammond
- Patrick Wong – bass guitar, backing vocals, cello

Production details

- Producer – Justin Stanley
- Engineer – Keith Cooper
- Mixer – Justin Stanley

== Charts ==
=== Weekly charts ===
Chart (1997)	Peak position
Australia (ARIA)	4
New Zealand (Recorded Music NZ)	34

=== Year-end charts ===
Chart (1997)	Position
Australia (ARIA)	54

== Certifications ==
Region	Certification	Certified units/sales
Australia (ARIA)	Gold	35,000^{^}
^{^} Shipments figures based on certification alone.

== Release history ==
Region	Date	Format(s)	Label(s)	Ref.
Australia	13 April 1997	CD	Mushroom	
Japan	21 November 1997	CD	Mushroom	
