= Split Second =

Split Second may refer to:

== Film and television ==
- Split Second (1953 film), an American film noir
- Split Second (1992 film), a British science fiction film
- Split Second (game show), an American-Canadian game show
- Split Second (TV series), a Hong Kong crime drama

== Literature ==
- Split Second (novel), a 2003 novel by David Baldacci
- The Split Second, a 2008 The Seems novel by John Hulme and Michael Wexler
- Split Second, a 1979 novel by Garry Kilworth

== Other uses ==
- Split/Second, an arcade racing video game
- A Split-Second, a Belgian electronic body music band
- Split Seconds, an Australian pop band
