= Leonardo's Bride =

Australian band

- Origin: Sydney, New South Wales, Australia
- Genres: Folk, pop
- Years active: 1992–2001, 2013
- Labels: Mushroom, PolyGram
- Past members: Abby Dobson; Dean Manning; Jon Howell; Patrick Wong; Antero Ceschin; Alex Hewetson; Jason Johnston; John Gauci; Mark Howard; David Sanders
- Website: leonardosbride.com

Leonardo's Bride were an Australian pop band that formed in 1992. It consisted of Abby Dobson on lead vocal and acoustic guitar; Dean Manning on electric guitar, piano, wurlitzer and hammond; Jon Howell on drums; and Patrick Wong (aka Patrick Hyndes) on bass guitar, backing vocals and cello. They released two EPs, Debut (12 May 1992) and Temperamental Friend (6 October 1994) and two albums, Angel Blood (28 April 1997) and Open Sesame (June 2000), before disbanding in 2001.

They were nominated for three ARIA Awards at the 1997 awards with their album Angel Blood and single "Even When I'm Sleeping". "Even When I'm Sleeping" was voted "Song of the Year" at the APRA Music Awards of 1998. In March 2013, Leonardo's Bride reformed to perform at the Byron Bay Bluesfest for two sessions.

== History ==
=== 1989–1995: Formation and EPs ===
In 1989 two founders of Leonardo's Bride, Abby Dobson on lead vocals and Dean Manning on acoustic guitar performed as a duo for the first time at an open mike night at the Crossroads Theatre in Sydney. In March 1990 the duo began writing tracks together and then travelled around Europe and United States busking and playing in clubs and bars, doing 250 shows over sixteen months. Some of the gigs included; Sin-e in New York City, Les voultes de lutece in Paris, Hen & Chickens in London and Zorba's bar in Santorini, Greece. A New York performance was described as "all acoustic, mostly original and startlingly beautiful. A typical set is a blend of folk ballads with strong harmonies, upbeat pop with a faint rock edge, and standards from around the world".

In 1992 they formed the folk-pop band in Sydney with Dobson on vocals and guitar; Manning on guitar, bouzouki and vocals; Alex Hewetson on double bass and Antero Ceschin on drums. In 1993 they independently released their first extended play, Leonardo's Bride, with four tracks. The self-titled track provided the band's name based on Leonardo da Vinci. Drum Media's Craig Mathieson felt the track "is spangly acoustic pop. Abby Dobson arcing her voice over luminous acoustic guitar. It sets a holding pattern they adhere to". Late that year Mark Howard replaced Hewetson on bass guitar and David Sanders replaced Ceschin on drums. They added John Gauci on keyboards and Hammond organ. By 1994 the line-up of Dobson, Manning, and Gauci were joined by Patrick Wong (aka Patrick Hyndes) on bass guitar and Jon Howell on drums. In October 1994 they issued their second EP, Temperamental Friend, on PolyGram's label Id. James Mayson of Drum Media felt they "drive a fairly quirky acoustic highway and manage to pick up some strange hitchhikers on the way ... [they] ride a carousel of emotions". In 1995 they toured supporting The Badloves in Australia and Big Geraniums in Ireland.

=== 1996–1998: Angel Blood ===
In 1996 Leonardo's Bride signed with Mushroom Records and started recording their debut album, Angel Blood, with Justin Stanley (Noiseworks) producing. The album's first single, "So Brand New", appeared late that year. On 28 April 1997 the album was released, which reached No. 25 on the ARIA Albums Chart. Australian rock music historian, Ian McFarlane, felt it featured "breezy and plaintive folksy acoustic guitar-pop with 1960s pop balladry and jazzy inflections, it was all topped off by Dobson’s sweet and husky vocals". At the ARIA Music Awards of 1997 it was nominated for 'Breakthrough Artist – Album' and 'Best Cover Art' by Simon Anderson and Manning.

Their second single, "Even When I'm Sleeping", was issued in June 1997, which peaked at No. 4 on the ARIA Singles Chart. The single was certified gold by ARIA for shipment of 35,000 units. It was nominated for 'Single of the Year' at the ARIA Music Awards of 1997. The track, written by Manning, won 'Song of the Year' and 'Most Performed Australian Work' at the APRA Music Awards of 1998. "Buddha Baby" was the last single released from the album and peaked in the Top 40. 1997 also saw the band tour with Everything but the Girl in Australia.

In April 1998 Leonardo's Bride provided a cover version of "This Girl's in Love with You" for the various artists' tribute album, To Hal and Bacharach. By that time Gauci had left due to the "constant pressure". In October 1998 Angel Blood was issued in the United States. By November the band had toured the United Kingdom and returned to Australia to appear at the Mushroom 25 Live concert, with their live performance of "Even When I'm Sleeping" appearing on the associated live and video albums by various Mushroom Records artists. They followed in December with a short tour supporting Neil Finn.

=== 1999–2001: Open Sesame and split ===
During 1999 Leonardo's Bride recorded their second album, Open Sesame, with Justin Stanley, James Cadsky (Ghostwriters) and the band co-producing. In April 2000 its first single, "Sonic," appeared, which McFarlane described as "another excellent and vibrant folksy pop song." In June the album was issued but did not reach the top 50. In October it was released in the US. In May 2001 "Even When I'm Sleeping", was selected by Australasian Performing Right Association (APRA) as one of the Top 30 Australian songs of all time. Leonardo's Bride disbanded in 2001 after a show in Johor Bahru, Malaysia. Two live tracks performed at Sydney's The Basement appear on A Night out... - Live at the Basement (2001) by various artists.

Dobson later described the band's time together "[i]t was a long association, but it's difficult to keep growing in a band. It's a huge relationship" and her poor health "[b]y the time Leonardo's Bride disbanded, I had developed rheumatoid arthritis and chronic fatigue syndrome."

=== 2002-present: Afterwards ===
Following the split, Dobson collaborated with Paul Mac on his album 3000 Feet High. In 2002, Dobson had started her solo career, releasing the single, "Don't Ask for More," which displayed a more radio-friendly sound. The song was featured on The Secret Life of Us volume 2, released through Liberation Music. In late 2007, Dobson released her first solo album, Rise Up, preceded by its first single, "Shining Star."

Dean Manning released his first solo album, Diplomatic, in 2003, and then formed Holidays on Ice with Angie Hart (ex-Frente!) on lead vocals. They have released 3 albums - Playing Boyfriends & Girlfriends (2005), Pillage Before Plunder (2009) and The Luxury of Wasted Space (2014). Manning, who had co-created Leonardo's Bride's album covers, regularly exhibits his paintings. Jon Howell formed a blues outfit, Chase the Sun, which released their self-titled debut album in 2009. Patrick Wong went on to study Chinese medicine and acupuncture, and practices in Newcastle.

In January 2013 Leonardo's Bride announced that they would to perform at the Byron Bay Bluesfest for two sessions during Easter.

In 2013 Dobson auditioned for Season 2 of The Voice (Australia) but was unsuccessful. In the audition, judge Delta Goodrem failed to recognise either Dobson or the band's hit "Even When I'm Sleeping."

== Discography ==
=== Albums ===
List of studio albums, with selected chart positions and certifications
| Title | Album details | Chart positions | | Certifications (sales thresholds) |
| Title | Album details | AUS | NZ | Certifications (sales thresholds) |
|---|---|---|---|---|
| Angel Blood | Released: 28 April 1997; Label: Mushroom | 25 | 35 | ARIA: Gold |
| Open Sesame | Released: June 2000; Label: Mushroom | 75 | — | |

=== Extended plays ===
List of extended plays, with selected details
| Title | EP details |
|---|---|
| Leonardo's Bride | Released: 1993; Label: Independent |
| Temperamental Friend | Released: October 1994; Label: PolyGram |

=== Singles ===
| Title | Year | Chart positions | | Certifications | Album |
| Title | Year | AUS | NZ | Certifications | Album |
|---|---|---|---|---|---|
| "So Brand New" | 1996 | — | — | | Angel Blood |
| "Even When I'm Sleeping" | 1997 | 4 | 34 | ARIA: Gold | Angel Blood |
| "Buddha Baby" | 1997 | 40 | — | | Angel Blood |
| "Sonic" | 2000 | — | — | | Open Sesame |

== Awards and nominations ==
=== ARIA Awards ===
| Year | Award | Work | Result |
|---|---|---|---|
| 1997 | Single of the Year | "Even When I'm Sleeping" | Nominated |
| 1997 | Breakthrough Artist – Album | Angel Blood | Nominated |
| 1997 | Best Cover Art (Simon Anderson, Dean Manning) | Angel Blood | Nominated |

=== APRA Awards ===
| Year | Award | Work | Result |
|---|---|---|---|
| 1998 | Song of the Year | "Even When I'm Sleeping" (Dean Manning) | Won |
| 1998 | Most Performed Work | "Even When I'm Sleeping" (Dean Manning) | Won |
