= Abel el'toro =

- Born: Abel Polo; 17 June 1971 (age 55); Enmore, New South Wales, Australia
- Origin: Sydney, Australia
- Genres: Alternative dance, electronica, house
- Instruments: Synthesizers, keyboards, turntables, drum machine
- Labels: Sony, EMI, Creative Vibes, Festival, Polygram
- Website: abeltoro.com.au

Abel Polo, known by his stage name Abel el'toro (born 17 June 1971), is a DJ, producer and promoter from Sydney, Australia.

== Biography ==
=== Early life ===
Polo describes his Spanish-Australian family as "an artistic family who encouraged creative freedom and individuality". Polo was trained in classical piano as a child, but fell in love with hip hop culture at an early age. He learnt how to breakdance at high school, and entered a Sydney breakdancing competition that was judged by Lucinda Dickey—played "Kelly" in the movie Breakin—and subsequently won second prize.

In 1986, during the birth of house and acid house, Polo attended his first dance party, "R.A.T", which was held at Bondi Pavilion. The R.A.T. experience inspired him to explore the art of DJ mixing with two turntables and vinyl records in his parents garage.

=== DJ career ===
Polo made the transition to professional DJing and promotion in 1991—his first DJ gig was at "The Trap Door" in Sydney. Abel was voted "DJ of the Year" by E-CLIPSE Rave Radio in 1992, and the following year, his resident club night, "Stun" at Neo Pharaoh, was declared 1993's "Techno Club of the Year" by 3D World Magazine.

Polo later headlined Sydney's biggest rave parties and festivals, along with DJs Nick the Fish, Jumping Jack, Pee Wee Ferris, GT, Sugar Ray, Paul Holden and Phil Smart.

In 1994, Polo toured through India, including Goa and Pune, DJing alongside friend Ray Castle, Raja Ram and Sven Väth. In 1999, Polo embarked on a European tour to visit Spain, and played at Amnesia's Cream in Ibiza. Spain was followed by the Love Parade in Berlin, Germany, and then London, England and Zurich, Switzerland. In 2001, Polo completed a tour of Hong Kong.

In addition to playing at Sydney's Big Day Out and Homebake music festivals, Polo supported the following touring acts at the Hordern Pavilion: The Chemical Brothers, Primal Scream, Carl Cox, Judge Jules, The Black Eyed Peas, Basement Jaxx, Daft Punk, Speedy J, Fatboy Slim, Paul Van Dyk, Laurent Garnier, The Shamen, The ORB, DJ Misjah & DJ Tim, Lenny Dee, DJ Slipmatt, Jeff Mills, Joey Beltram, DJ Sasha, John Digweed and Deep Dish.

== Promoter career ==
Polo's first event as a promoter was the rave, "All in the Bubble of Yum". Polo's early success in the promotion of events led him to partner with Sydney DJ Ming D for the "Happy Valley" event held at Windsor, New South Wales, Australia, in 1991. Along with his brother Alex Polo, he catered to Sydney's rave scene by organising parties in obscure venues, such as the "Midnight Madness" raves of the 1990s (held at the Darling Harbour Fun Park).

Polo later promoted various parties, including "Bent", held at the Cell Block Theatre and The Australian Technology Park; "Platform 31", held at Central Station's disused Mortuary Railway station; and "Watch Wyle U Dance", held at The Footbridge Theatre, Sydney University. By the middle of the 1990s, Polo and friend DJ Oscar Goldman decided that Sydney needed a midweek club night where "new school" breakbeat and "old school" hip hop could be heard—"Warm Up" at Mr Goodbar was the result. Warm Up, which lasted for six years, helped to launch several Australian DJ careers, and featured regular appearances by The Rapid Fire Breakers.

=== Other projects ===
Polo's first band "The Hoong & I" played a series of live shows from 1994 to 1999, including The Byron Bay Arts and Music Festival, in Byron Bay, Australia, and The Strawberry Fields festival in the Gold Coast hinterland, Australia.

Polo later formed the band "The Boogaloo Crew" in 2001, which recently performed at an ARIA Awards after-party with Jessica Mauboy and Kimbra. As of 2014, the Boogaloo Crew remains active and supported shows for Dimitri from Paris and Pete Tong, as well as club and corporate events, such as Cargo Bar, Home, a Bacardi event at Randwick Racecourse, Sydney, and a Google event at Fox Studios, Sydney.

== Personal life ==
Polo enjoys snowboarding and embarked on a DJ/snowboarding tour with Snow Wave New Zealand (Auckland, Wellington, Christchurch, Queenstown), as well as Mt Hotham, Victoria, Australia, and Sydney's Perisher Valley.

== Discography ==
=== Remixing and production ===
Year	Title	Artist	Label
2004	Here we go	Sophie Monk	Warners
2003	Funk Love	Funk D'void	Arcadia
2002	Oh Yeah	Sleek the Elite	Bad Fly Records
2001	My Friend	Post	Cabbage Records
2000	On the Microphone	DJ Abel el'toro	Homebake – Sony
2000	Jalima'	DJ Abel el'toro	Mardi Gras – Sony
2000	The Right Thang	DJ Abel el'toro	Creative Vibes
2000	Xtermination	DJ Abel el'toro	Creative Vibes
1999	Keep a Rockin'	DJ Abel el'toro	Groovescooter
1999	Gypsy Eye's	DJ Abel el'toro	Pacifica Records
1999	All my lovin'	Johnny Young	Foxtel Classics
1998	Bedrock	Bifteck / Paul Mac	Festival
1998	Mommy Daddy	Sidewinder	Polygram
1997	Breathing through my eyes	Skunkhour	Sony
1997	All Systems are Go	Paul Mac	EMI
1996	4 U 2 Know	JumpingJack	Sony
1996	Amore	DJ Abel El'toro	Freak Flag Records
1996	My Sweet Lord	Nina Hagen	Stonewall
1996	You can run	Collette	Larrikin Records
1996	Madworld	Alex Taylor	DCM
1996	Good Fun	DJ Paul Holden	Solar Rhythm
1995	A Pinch of Psychedelic	The Hoong & I	Psy Harmonics
1994	Take me up	Southend	Volition

=== DJ mix compilations ===
Year	Title	Label
2007	Byron Bay Home Invasion	Psy Harmonics
2002	Live in Hong Kong	Downunderground
2002	Happy Valley	Downunderground
2000	States of Dance	Sony
1995	Mixed Beans Mixes	BPM Records
1993	Green Acres 2	Loko Llama
1992	Green Acres	Loko Llama
