= Homebake =

Australian music festival (1996–2012)

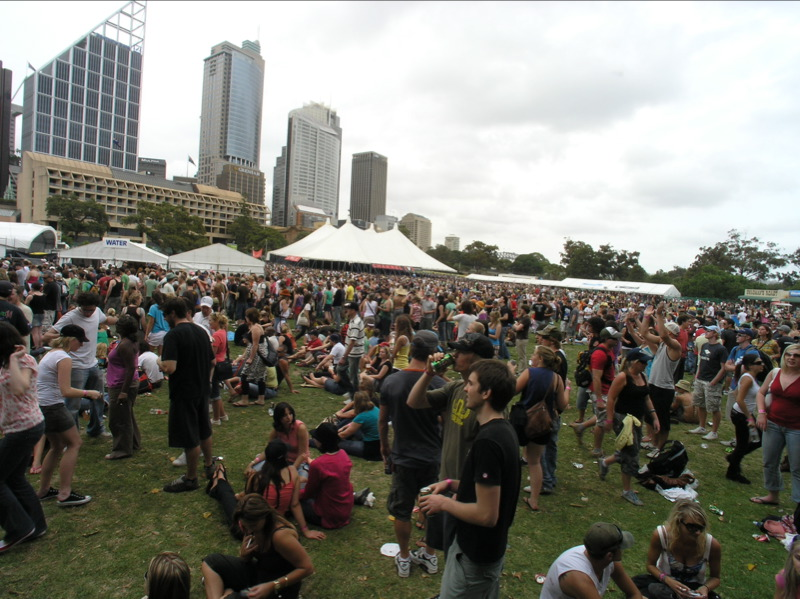
Homebake 2006 - The Domain

Homebake was an annual Australian rock festival, featuring an all-Australian lineup (with the occasional artist from New Zealand). The festival was first held on 3 January 1996 at Belongil Fields in Byron Bay, on the far north coast of New South Wales. The same year saw a second event held at the grounds of the University of Sydney.

The festival returned in January 1998 as an East Coast event happening in Melbourne, the Gold Coast and Sydney. In December of the same year, it was held again in Sydney this time at the Domain. In late 1999 the event went on the road again, but this time to only the Gold Coast and Sydney. In 2000 the festival reverted to just Sydney, and was held at the Domain every December until 2012.

Tickets for the festival have regularly sold out in advance and typically quickly, evidenced by the 2006 event which sold out on the first day of sale. The fastest sellout, however, was in 2008, when all 20,000 tickets sold in less than 10 minutes.

The 2007 Homebake took place on Saturday 8 December, once again at The Domain. It was announced that the event would be 18+ for the first time in its history. Despite some protests, Homebake organisers explained on Triple J's Hack program that each year the all ages liquor licence was becoming harder to obtain, and compared to their research showing that attendance for the event by underagers was between 5 and 8% influenced the decision to go 18+.

The last Homebake was held in 2012, and the following year's event was unexpectedly cancelled. The festival has not been held since, and as of now, it is unlikely to be resurrected.

== Artists lineups by year ==
=== 1996 ===
==== Byron Bay ====
Hardware; Fur; Grinspoon; Magic Dirt; Powderfinger; Regurgitator; Screamfeeder	Sidewinder; Silverchair; Spiderbait; The Mark of Cain; Tumbleweed; You Am I (Did not play due to Rusty being injured)

==== University of Sydney ====
Ammonia; Anne Gibbons; Crow; Custard; Dave Graney and the Coral Snakes; Def FX; Dirty Three; Flyspeak; Frenzal Rhomb	John Reed Club; Jebediah; Lodestar; Magic Dirt; Pollyanna; Powderfinger; Rebecca's Empire; Regurgitator; Screamfeeder; Shihad	Sidewinder; Smudge; Something for Kate; Spiderbait; Swirl; The Fauves; The Mark of Cain; The Porkers; Tumbleweed; Underground Lovers

=== 1998 ===
==== January - Sydney, Gold Coast, Melbourne ====
Ammonia; Big Heavy Stuff; Bluebottle Kiss; Custard; Emporium; Frenzal Rhomb; Gaslight Radio; Grinspoon	Headless Chickens; Jebediah; Not From There; Pangaea; Pollyanna; Powderfinger; Screamfeeder; Shihad	Sidewinder; Skunkhour; Spiderbait; The Superjesus; Tiddas; Toothfaeries; Tumbleweed; Underground Lovers; You Am I

==== December - Sydney ====
Ammonia; Bodyjar; Custard; Endorphin; Eskimo Joe; Even; Fini Scad; Frenzal Rhomb; Frontside; Grinspoon	Jebediah; Karma County; Nancy Vandal; Not From There; Pauline Pantsdown; Primary; Ratcat; Screamfeeder; Sidewinder; Something for Kate	Spiderbait; The Avalanches; The Feelers; The Living End; The Mavis's; Resin Dogs; The Teeth Suckers; The Whitlams; TISM; Toe To Toe; Vapourware

=== 1999 ===
==== Sydney and Gold Coast ====
		Gold Coast only	Sydney only
Alex Lloyd; Area 7; Dirty Three; Frenzal Rhomb; Gerling; Grinspoon; iOTA; Jebediah	Josh & Amiel; Powderfinger; Resin Dogs; Shihad; Silverchair; Something for Kate; sonicanimation; The Avalanches	Custard; Gota Cola; Not From There; Pretty Violet Stain; Rollerball; Screamfeeder; Soma Rasa; Sunk Loto; The Whitlams	Big Heavy Stuff; Bluebottle Kiss; Deadstar; Del-Emmas; Killers on the Loose; The Monarchs; Neil Hamburger; Pound System; Rumanastone; Shihad; The Porkers; 51 Monday; 78 Saab; 28 Days

=== 2000 ===
Main Stage	Big Top	Juice Stage	Hopetoun Stage
The Living End; Spiderbait; Resin Dogs; Frenzal Rhomb; Jebediah; Regurgitator; Bodyjar; Magic Dirt; Sunk Loto; Not From There; Superheist; Sick Puppies	Sonicanimation; DJ Abel; Alex Lloyd; Something for Kate; Friendly; Bexta; Endorphin; Pnau; Toby Neal; Wicked Beat Sound System; 78 Saab; John Butler Trio	Testeagles; Tumbleweed; Skulker; On Inc.; Machine Gun Fellatio; Screamfeeder; Nokturnl; H-Block 101; Waikiki; Pound System	Rocket Science; Full Fathom Five; Augie March; Art of Fighting; Soma Rasa; Gersey; The Anyones

=== 2001 ===
Main Stage	Big Top	Juice Stage	Hopetoun Stage
Hoodoo Gurus; Alex Lloyd; You Am I; Something for Kate; 28 Days; The Superjesus; Bodyjar; Gerling; Superheist; One Dollar Short; Commissioner Gordon	TISM; DJ Love Tattoo; Sonicanimation; Resin Dogs; DJ Declan; Pnau; Paul Mac; DJ Bexta; Skunkhour; Endorphin; Primary; The Hive	John Butler Trio; Kasey Chambers; George; Augie March; Machine Gun Fellatio; Eskimo Joe; Big Heavy Stuff; Speedstar; Lash	On Inc.; Pound System; 1200 Techniques; Art of Fighting; Bluebottle Kiss; Dan Brodie & The Broken Arrows; MC Trey; The Pedestraians; Decoder Ring

=== 2002 ===
Main Stage	Big Top	The Dome	Hopetoun Stage	Acoustic Pavilion
Alex Lloyd; Grinspoon; You Am I; Radio Birdman; Machine Gun Fellatio; Shihad; Wilcannia Mob; Jebediah; Eskimo Joe; Superheist; Serpahs Coal; For Amusement Only	Sonicanimation; Kid Kenobi; Pnau; 1200 Techniques; James De La Cruz; Gerling; Salmonella Dub; Mark Dynamix; Wicked Beat Sound System; Katalyst; Offcuts; Sneaky Sound System	Kasey Chambers; George; Paul Kelly; Rocket Science; The D4; Bluebottle Kiss; Dan Brodie & The Broken Arrows; The Sleepy Jackson; Jet; Antiskeptic	Waikiki; Decoder Ring; David McCormack & The Polaroids; Gersey; Gelbison; Rhubarb; The Butterfly Effect; Crank; Isherwood	Paul Dempsey; Killing Heidi; Speedstar; Tim Rogers; Stiff Gins; Darren Hanlon; Simon Day; Shane Nicholson; Laura Imbruglia

=== 2003 ===
Main Stage	Big Top	The Dome	Hopetoun Stage
Nick Cave and the Bad Seeds; The Vines; Something for Kate; The Superjesus; 1200 Techniques; Magic Dirt; John Butler Trio; The Sleepy Jackson; For Amusement Only; Best Kept Secret	Pnau; DJ Ben Korbel; Resin Dogs; Gerling; DJ Bexta; Katalyst; Amiel; DJ Alex Taylor; Downsyde; The Bumblebeez; Zephyr Timbre; Maya Jupiter	Frenzal Rhomb; Beasts of Bourbon; The Church; The Cat Empire; Pete Murray; The Butterfly Effect; Screamfeeder; The Casanovas; Offcuts; Blindspott	The Mess Hall; Little Birdy; Dallas Crane; Peabody; Spod; The Morning After Girls; Riff Random; Second Dan

=== 2004 ===
Main Stage	Big Top	The Dome	Hopetoun Stage
Jet; Grinspoon; Eskimo Joe; Spiderbait; Rocket Science; The D4; After the Fall; Gyroscope; Wolfmother; Ground Components	Hilltop Hoods; DJ Bexta; Sonicanimation; Regurgitator; DJ Sharif; Wicked Beat Sound System; Spod (DJ Set); Machine Gun Fellatio; Katalyst; Cut Copy; Koolism; Dei Hamo	Pete Murray; Kasey Chambers; Missy Higgins; Xavier Rudd; Gelbison; End of Fashion; 78 Saab; Sarah Blasko; The Morning After Girls; The City Lights	Art of Fighting; Gerling (DJ Set); The Panics; The Cops; The Spazzys; Theredsunband; The Tremors; The Camels; Die!Die!Die!; The Golden Age

=== 2005 ===
Main Stage	Big Top	The Dome	Hopetoun Stage
The Finn Brothers; The Living End; Something for Kate; Ben Lee; Wolfmother; Evermore; Cog; End of Fashion; The Mess Hall; Kisschasy	Dirty Three; P-Money; Cut Copy; Pnau; Katalyst & RUCL; Decoder Ring; DJ Peril & Suburban Intellect; The Rogue Traders; The Herd; The Presets; Sneaky Sound System; Local Knowledge	The Cat Empire; Alex Lloyd; The Saints; The Beautiful Girls; Sarah Blasko; The Go-Betweens; Architecture in Helsinki; Amiel; Expatriate; British India	The Morning After Girls; Die!Die!Die!; The Grates; Wolf & Cub; Dappled Cities Fly; The Hot Lies; The Scare; N'fa; The Golden Age; Beau Young; Pomomofo

=== 2006 ===
Main Stage	Big Top	The Dome	Hopetoun Stage
Silverchair; Eskimo Joe; Hilltop Hoods; You Am I; The Butterfly Effect; Scribe; Little Birdy; Parkway Drive; Something With Numbers; The Vaine	Björn Again; The Presets; Kid Kenobi & MC Shureshock; The Vines; Gotye; Wolf & Cub; Infusion; Midnight Juggernauts; N'fa; Macromantics; Mountains in the Sky	Something for Kate; Augie March; Models; Youth Group; Bob Evans; Toni Collette And The Finish; Jen Cloher and The Endless Sea; British India; Angus & Julia Stone; Young & Restless	Red Riders; Ground Components; Die!Die!Die!; The Valentinos; Children Collide; Tucker B's; Whiskey Go Go's; Tom Cooney; The Basics; Regular John

=== 2007 ===
Main Stage	Big Top	The Dome	Hopetoun Stage
Divinyls; Missy Higgins; Gotye; Scribe; The Beautiful Girls; Kisschasy; Operator Please; British India; Behind Crimson Eyes; Mammal	Pnau; Architecture in Helsinki; Muscles; Cut Copy; Midnight Juggernauts; The Bumblebeez; Blue King Brown; Wicked Beat Sound System; Expatriate; Red Eye Society; Foreign Heights	Paul Kelly; Paul Dempsey; Sarah Blasko; Josh Pyke; Angus & Julia Stone; The Mess Hall; Ed Kuepper & The Kowalski Collective; Art of Fighting; Kid Confucius; Number Station	The Scare; Old Man River; Belles Will Ring; Pivot; The Brunettes; The Checks; SubAudible Hum; Bridezilla; Bridgemary Kiss

=== 2008 ===
Main Stage	Big Top	The Dome	Hopetoun Stage
Crowded House; Sneaky Sound System; PNAU; Karnivool; British India; The Getaway Plan; Bluejuice; Eddy Current Suppression Ring; Die!Die!Die!; Numbers Radio	Cut Copy; Bliss N Eso; Drapht; The Potbelleez; Headless Chickens; Infusion; Snob Scrilla; Bag Raiders; Pegz; The E.L.F.	You Am I; Kasey Chambers and Shane Nicholson; Gabriella Cilmi; Died Pretty; End of Fashion; Little Red; SubAudible Hum; Dash and Will; The Holidays	Grafton Primary; Sparkadia; Children Collide; Mercy Arms; N'fa; 78 Saab; Violent Soho; Hamish Macleod; Fire! Santa Rosa, Fire!; Deep Sea Arcade

=== 2009 ===
Main Stage	Big Top	The Dome	Hopetoun Stage
Powderfinger; Jet; Hilltop Hoods; Eskimo Joe; Tumbleweed; Funkoars; Short Stack; Closure in Moscow; The Scare; Philadelphia Grand Jury	Midnight Juggernauts; Daniel Merriweather; Shockone; Decoder Ring; Phrase; The Aston Shuffle; The Bumblebeez; Tiki Taane; Record Producer; Catcall	Sarah Blasko; Tim Finn; Sia; Paul Dempsey; Underground Lovers; Gin Wigmore with The Cardinals; Dappled Cities; The Middle East; Sugar Army	Eddy Current Suppression Ring; Yves Klein Blue; Howling Bells; Red Riders; Die!Die!Die!; Bridezilla; Parades; Jonathan Boulet; Boy And Bear; Kyu

Rowland S. Howard was advertised to play but was forced to cancel citing health concerns. Dappled Cities played in his allotted timeslot.

=== 2010 ===
On 25 August 2010, the organisers of Homebake announced the festival would not take place in 2010, and would instead return in 2011. The organisers cited "not being able to have the 'planets align' to a standard we feel appropriate" as a reason for cancelling the festival in 2010.

=== 2011 ===
Grinderman; Pnau; Gotye; Gurrumul Yunupingu; Cut Copy; Icehouse; Ladyhawke; Drapht; Daniel Merriweather; The Triffids	Eskimo Joe; Architecture in Helsinki; The Church; The Vines; Illy; The Jezabels; Kimbra; CW Stoneking; Kids of 88; Unknown Mortal Orchestra	Papa vs Pretty; Hungry Kids of Hungary; Passenger; Killaqueenz; Avalanche City; Vents; Noah Taylor and the Sloppy Boys; 360; Ratcat; Bleeding Knees Club	Damndogs; Owl Eyes; Gold Fields; Big Scary; Split Seconds; Rüfüs; Seeker Lover Keeper; Lanie Lane; Daniel Lee Kendall

=== 2012 ===
Event organisers announced that the 2012 Homebake would be a "Global" edition. While the line-up for the event, scheduled for 8 December 2012, is predominantly Australasian, American band Blondie has been selected as the headlining act. Pond, Tame Impala, Kimbra, Something For Kate, Hilltop Hoods, Sonic Animation, and Birds of Tokyo are some of the other performing artists.

== After 2012 ==
The event was cancelled in 2013. Organizers acknowledged that there was a hiatus for 2014. It is unlikely the festival will ever return.
