= Panic Room (album) =

Studio album by Paul Mac
- Released: 17 October 2005
- Recorded: The Panic Room, Sydney
- Genres: Dance-pop; house
- Length: 46:27
- Label: Eleven

Paul Mac chronology
3000 Feet High (2001)	Panic Room (2005)	Holiday From Me (2015)

Singles from Panic Room
- 1. "Sunshine Eyes" Released: 25 September 2005; 2. "Love Declaration" Released: 11 March 2006; 3. "It's Not Me, It's You" Released: 2006

Panic Room is the second studio album by Australian singer-songwriter and music producer Paul Mac. It was released in October 2005 and peaked at No. 39 in Australia. The album was nominated for the "Best Dance Release" at the 2006 ARIA Music Awards, this is the award he won in 2002. The title refers to Paulmac's home studio where the album was recorded.

"I've been working on my new album for the past couple of years and I'm really excited it's finally about to be released", says Mac. "I can't wait to bring this album alive on stage with the singers, the choir and my band".

== Promotion ==
On 14 October Paul Mac appeared on Channel [V]'s "What U Want" and Rove Live.

On 29 September Paul Mac announced live performance throughout Australia. This was his first solo dates in over three years and featured multi-vocalists line up. The tour was called "The Paul Mac Experience".

Date	Location	Venue
23 November	Bangalow	A&I Hall
24 November	Brisbane	Tivoli Theatre
25 November	Sydney	Metro Theatre
27 November	Melbourne	Prince of Wales
28 November	Melbourne	Chapel off Chapel

Paul Mac also performed at Sydney's Homebake Festival on 3 December, Sydney's Good Vibrations Festival on 18 February 2006 and Great Escape Festival on 15 April.

== Track listing ==
No.	Title	Writer(s)	Vocals	Length
1.	"Panic Room"	Paul Mac	Lenka	6:06
2.	"It's Not Me, It's You"	Paul Mac & Liz Winstanley	Ngaiire	3:55
3.	"Sunshine Eyes"	Paul Mac	Peta Morris	4:00
4.	"Love Declaration"	Paul Mac	Aaradhna	4:40
5.	"Never Been Before"	Paul Mac	Sarah McLeod	6:25
6.	"Heaven Where You Find It"	Paul Mac	Lenka	6:01
7.	"As Long As I Am"	Paul Mac	Luke Steele	5:27
8.	"All We Really Want"	Paul Mac	Peta Morris	5:47
9.	"Slow Down Time"	Paul Mac & Charlotte Kelly	Aaradhna	4:44
10.	"The Beginning of the End Of Time"	Paul Mac & Abby Dobson	Abby Dobson	8:10
Total length:				46.27

Panic Room (Renovations Disc)
No.	Title	Length
1.	"Panic Room" (Stereogamous Extension)	7:18
2.	"It's Not Me, It's You" (Itchee & Scratchee Remix)	5:10
3.	"Sunshine Eyes" (Nick Littlemore / Paul Mac Remix)	6:32
4.	"It's Not Me, It's You" (The Presets Remix)	5:17
5.	"Panic Room" (TV Rock Mix)	6:37

== Charts ==
Chart (2005)	Peak position
Australian Albums (ARIA)	39
