= The Sound of Breaking Up =

Single by Paul Mac featuring Peta Morris

from the album 3000 Feet High
- Released: 29 October 2001
- Studio: The Fibromajestic, Sydney
- Length: 3:20
- Label: Eleven: A Music Company
- Songwriter: Paul Mac
- Producer: Paul Mac

Paul Mac singles chronology
"Just the Thing" (2001)	"The Sound of Breaking Up" (2001)	"Gonna Miss You" (2002)

Audio video
- "The Sound of Breaking Up" on YouTube

"The Sound of Breaking Up" is a song recorded by Australian singer-songwriter and music producer Paul Mac and features the vocals of Peta Morris. The song was released in October 2001 as the third single from Mac's debut studio album 3000 Feet High. "The Sound of Breaking Up" peaked at number 25 on the Australian ARIA Charts.

At the APRA Music Awards of 2002 the song was nominated for the APRA Award for Most Performed Dance Work.

== Track listing ==
1. "The Sound of Breaking Up" – 3:20
2. "The Sound of Breaking Up" (Paul Mac’s Afterdark remix) – 3:34
3. "The Sound of Breaking Up" (L'More remix) – 7:34
4. "Just the Thing" (Sgt Slick's Vinylvoyage Club mix) – 9:32

== Charts ==
Chart performance for "The Sound of Breaking Up"
Chart (2001)	Peak position
Australia (ARIA)	25

== Release history ==
Release history and formats for "The Sound of Breaking Up"
Country	Date	Format	Label	Catalogue
Australia	29 October 2001	CD single	Eleven: A Music Company	elevencd5
