= Ngaiire =

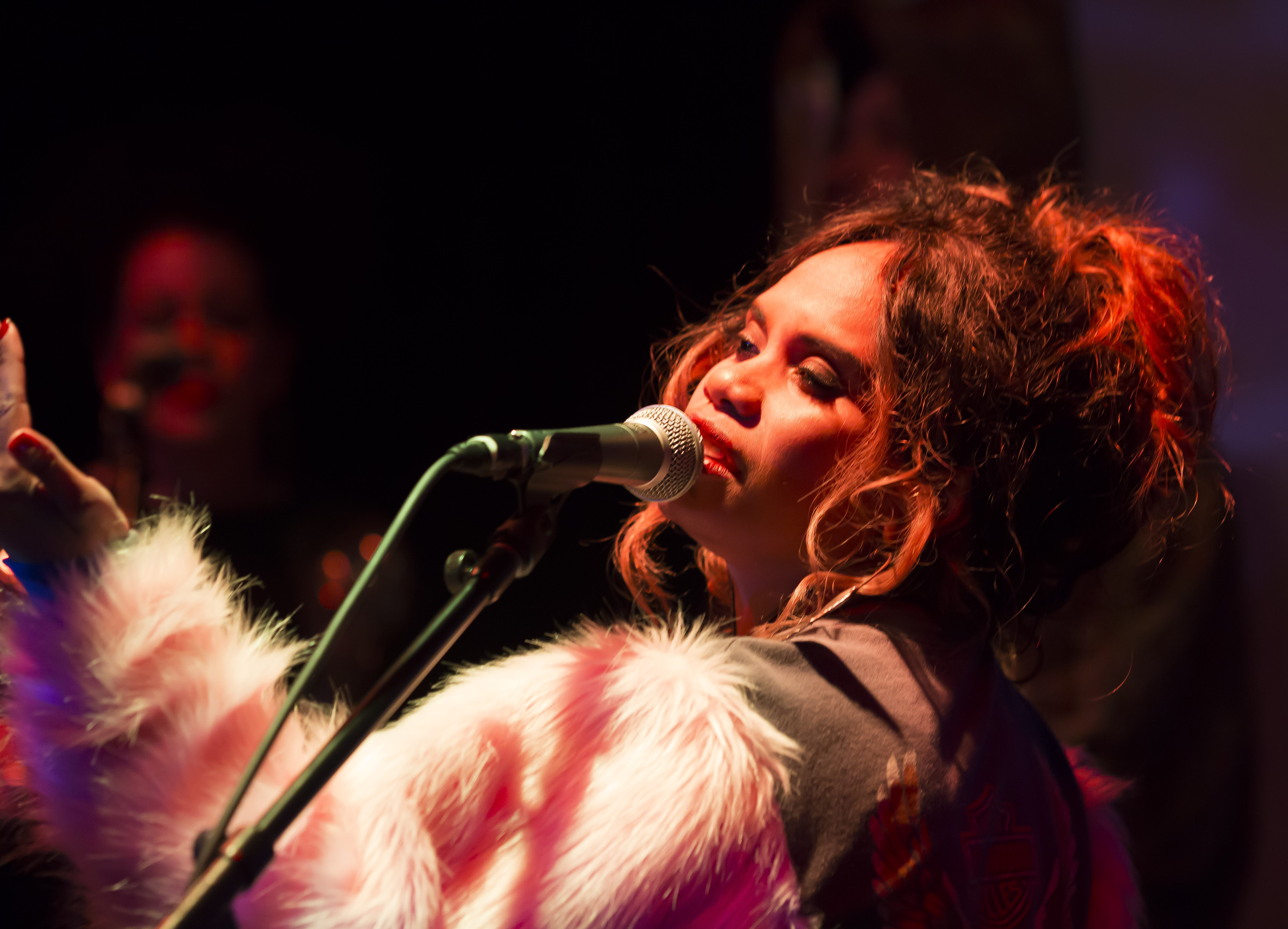
- Newtown Social Club, August 2015

Background information
- Born: Ngaire Laun J Joseph; 1984; Lae, Morobe Province, Papua New Guinea
- Origin: Lismore, New South Wales, Australia
- Genres: R&B; neo soul; future soul
- Occupation: Singer-songwriter
- Instrument: Vocals
- Years active: 2002–present
- Labels: Windsong; Wantok; MGM
- Website: ngaiire.com

Ngaire Laun Joseph (born 1984, in Lae), known by her stage name Ngaiire (pronounced ny-ree or /naɪəriː/), is a Papua New Guinea-born Australian-based R&B and future soul singer-songwriter. Her musical career commenced in 2003 with an enrollment in a bachelor of Jazz Studies at the Central Queensland University (CQU). In 2004, she competed in the second season of Australian Idol, where she competed as a semi-finalist but did not make it to the final 12 singers. She then worked with Blue King Brown and Paul Mac as a session vocalist before re-focusing on her solo career in 2008.

Ngaiire's debut studio album, Lamentations, was released in July 2013 and her second album, Blastoma, was released in June 2016. Her third, 3, was released in August 2021.

In 2018 APRA AMCOS appointed Ngaiire as an ambassador.

== Biography ==
=== 1984–1999: Early life ===
Ngaiire was born, as Ngaire Laun J Joseph, in 1984 in Lae, Papua New Guinea, and is the eldest of three siblings. Her Grandfather was a pastor. She is bilingual: being fluent in English and Tok Pisin. Her parents moved to Palmerston North, New Zealand when she was one year old to study and the family returned to Papua New Guinea (PNG) six years later.

While in New Zealand Ngaiire was diagnosed with ganglioneuroblastoma, which manifested as a cancer of her adrenal glands at the age of three. This later influenced the music video for her 2013 single, "Dirty Hercules" and choice of title for the album Blastoma.

Ngaiire and her family were living in Rabaul until the Mt Tarvurvur volcano erupted in September 1994 and covered most of the town (including their home) with volcanic ash. She attended Sacred Heart International Primary School, Rabaul before going to Lae Christian Academy. Her parents had divorced after returning to PNG, both subsequently remarried. She learnt that music could make her life more stable, "When I was about 11 or 12 and I was living in PNG and singing was just one of those things I did. I listened to a lot of music. Life there has loads of craziness and so many unexpected things happen. Music gave me the ability to talk about and feel all the things that were going on in my world." She explained, "I always viewed songs as a form of poetry that didn't necessarily need to make sense to anyone else."

=== 2000–2004: Career beginnings and Australian Idol ===
In 2000, Ngaiire moved to Lismore, New South Wales, with her mother, Miriam Murphy, and stepfather where she attended Kadina High School until 2003. She entered the local Accelerator music competition in 2002 and recorded her first song, "I Remember", for the Accelerator 2002: The Winners album at Top Cat Recording Studios, Alstonville for Windsong Records. In 2003, She moved to Mackay, Queensland to start her Bachelor of Jazz Studies at Central Queensland University (CQU). While at university she fronted local jazz bands.

In 2004, Ngaiire's entered the second season of Australian Idol. She was voted off while in the top 30 but was brought back as a "wild card" for the live shows. Ngaiire was voted off a second time in the top 13. Ngaiire with other top 12 contestants, guested on the grand final night. In 2014, Buzzfeed's Mikey Nicholson ranked Ngaiire's rendition of India Arie's "Back to the Middle" in the top 10 all time Australian Idol performances.

Following Australian Idol, Ngaiire returned to her jazz studies and attempted to reduce the perceived stigma associated with appearing on the talent show. She turned down offers from American recording industry professionals and remained independent by signing with Wantok Musik Foundation.

Her second solo recording was a four-track single, "Luv Sa Giaman", which translates as "Love Tells Lies". She recorded it with a Lismore-based band, the Rent, in 2005 and released it in Australia through WindSong Records label. Ngaiire and the Rent toured PNG in support of the single.

=== 2004–2006: Blue King Brown and Paul Mac ===
Ngaiire joined Blue King Brown as a backing vocalist in 2004 following their debut single, "Water". She toured with them for the next four years in support of the band's self-titled debut EP and first album, Stand Up in 2006. With Ngaiire they toured the United Kingdom, Japan, Europe and Canada as well as regional Australia. She explained to Miranda Freeman of Rip It Up! that during this period she matured as a musician and learned how to be a successful independent artist.

Ngaiire was the featured vocalist on Paul Mac's single, "It's Not Me, It's You", released in December 2005. The song reached No. 8 on the ARIA Club Tracks chart. Ngaiire was a vocalist on Paul Mac's Australian tour in support of his second studio album, Panic Room. He described her as a "diminutive bomb of goodness" to AustralianStage's Lloyd Bradford Syke.

=== 2007–2010: Song for No One and Two Minds ===
Ngaiire recorded her debut extended play, Song for No One, in 2007 with Sydney-based producer, Tony Buchen (aka Buchman). The EP provided the singles "Song for No One", and the 1920s-style "Glorious". "Glorious" was a popular track with Triple J and National Institute of Dramatic Art (NIDA) supporting the creation of a music video, produced by Karla Conway.

John Butler asked Ngaiire to precede his set at the 2009 East Coast Blues and Roots Festival and supported her professional development with management training and funding via his JB Seed Fund.

In March 2010, Ngaiire release a second EP titled Two Minds.

In 2010, Triple J listed Ngaiire on the 2010 Next Crop artist list and played her tracks on Triple J Unearthed.

=== 2011–2014: Lamentations ===
In 2013, Ngaiire contacted jazz pianist and producer Aaron Choulai via email, starting with, "Hey, man, I just really love what you do. Can I come over to Japan and hang out with you a bit and write some music?" Choulai agreed and they spent two weeks working together, which she described to Kate Kingsmill of The Music as, "you just had to keep cracking and keep cracking until it burst open. And once you got there it was the best feeling. Nothing could really replace the feeling of having completed a song." For recording sessions she returned to Sydney where she used Tim Curnick on bass guitar and as another co-producer.

Ngaiire released her debut studio album, Lamentations in July 2013. The title was inspired by a combination of Henry Purcell's Dido's Lament and the Book of Lamentations, together with fantasy and personal experience. Prior to finishing the album Ngaiire damaged her spine in a car accident and experienced the death of two close relatives. The album received positive reviews.

At the 9th Australian Music Prize, Lamentations was nominated for the Most Highly Regarded Album in 2013 and was ranked at number 27 by Faster Louder on the 2013 Critics list and number 25 on the Readers List.

In 2014, Ngaiire returned from performing at the Glastonbury Festival to the news that her partner of five years (and co-producer of Lamentations) had ended their relationship.

=== 2015–2016: Blastoma ===
In July 2015, Ngaiire released, "Once", the lead single from her second studio album. The accompanying music video was styled in the form of an interview and biographical dream, with a live recording also being produced in the Triple J Like a Version studio. "Once" polled 73rd on the Triple J Hottest 100, 2015 and was noted for appearing on the list despite being released on an independent label by an unsigned artist. "Once" resulted in Ngaiire's first solo appearance on the list and is the first instance of a Papua New Guinean-born artist making it into the Hottest 100.

The second single, "Diggin'" was released in February 2016, and debuted at number 16 on the Australian Independent Music Charts. The music video is heavy in its use of shadows and gold with lithe, provocative dance moves. "Diggin'" is a track that speaks of "being found before you find yourself in a permanent state of no return", and was called a "triumphant celebration of life".

The album's third single "House on a Rock", was released in May 2016. It was described as being more electronic and dance-able than previous singles, and was also called "the most innovative soul music Australia has seen". The accompanying music video was shot in Tel Aviv and gives a "behind closed doors" look at a failed relationship. In June 2016, Ngaiire released her second studio album Blastoma, named after her childhood disease. The album was produced by Choulai, Mac and Jack Grace (p.k.a. Jack Britten). Ngaiire collaborated more widely than on previous works and recorded it over two years, primarily at Mac's studio in Erskineville.

Howl & Echoes called it "a carefully considered, cohesive and dynamic album", while The Interns wrote that it "form[ed] a happy marriage of old soul, experimentation and futuristic vision". and Beat Magazine described it as an evolution on prior works, with a more mature and refined sound than on Lamentations.

On 18 June 2016, the album debuted at number 41 on the Australian ARIA Albums Chart.

=== 2017–2021: 3 ===
In October 2019, Ngaiire released "Shiver", which she co-wrote with Jack Grace, and according to the AU Review is "bout getting goosebumps for no reason in broad daylight or seeing things that your mind doesn't have the intelligence to compute." It was shortlisted for the 2019 Vanda & Young Global Songwriting Competition.

On 12 March 2020, Ngaiire released "Boom", which is reported to explore the taboo nature of sex and the tension between lust and suppression.

In May 2021, Ngaiire announced the release of her third studio album 3 with the aim of "extracting unique visual aspects of my culture to present in a contemporary context". These preparations have included trips back to Papua New Guinea and a much stronger focus on collaborative songwriting than has occurred in previous albums. Ngaiire originally intended to tour in support of this new album starting in March 2020, but was forced to postpone the tour due to the COVID-19 pandemic. The album's third single, "Closer", was released on 20 May 2021 and 3 was fully released on 27 August 2021, earning 3 ARIA nominations.

=== 2022–present: Live at the Sydney Opera House ===
In 2022, Ngaiire performed at the Sydney Opera House, with The recording being released in April 2024. The event's success led to multiple invitations, including the Queensland Symphony Orchestra in August 2023, the Melbourne Symphony Orchestra in March 2024 and a return to the Opera House the following April.

== Collaborations, styles and influences ==
Ngaiire's music is rooted in a resurgent Australian neo-soul movement, and she was listed as one of Australia's leading live R&B/soul acts in 2015 by The [AU] Review, being described as "the beating heart of the contemporary live music scene in Australia". She has been compared to the artists, Jeff Buckley, Hiatus Kaiyote, Kimbra, and Angie Stone and her music both expands and transcends musical boundaries. Her collaborations span multiple genres; including experimental jazz, contemporary synth and electro-pop, Melanesian string band, roots, blues and world music as well as hip hop, rap and future bass.

Ngaiire's musical style includes pronounced vocals and rich harmonies layered with and often led by complex rhythms. Her sound was described by Jordan Hirst of Music Feeds, as a combination of Mary J. Blige and Erykah Badu's voices mixed with M.I.A.'s genre-bending sensibility. According to Tedi Bills of BMA Magazine, her lyrics express complex emotional and social issues, her performances are notable for her flamboyant costumes, and her music videos have been described as more typical of art films than a 'normal' music video.

== Discography ==
=== Studio albums ===
Title	Album details	Peak positions
Title	Album details	AUS
Lamentations	Released: 12 July 2013; Label: Wantok Music (W0010)	—
Blastoma	Released: 10 June 2016; Label: Maximilion Brown, The Orchard, Sony Music Australia	41
3	Released: 27 August 2021; Label: Dot Dash, Majestic Casual	32

=== Live albums ===
Title	Album details	Peak positions
Title	Album details	AUS Ind.
Live at the Sydney Opera House	Released: 26 April 2024; Label: Dot Dash	16

=== Extended plays ===
Title	EP details
Song for No One	Released: August 2008; Label: Ya Mum's House
Two Minds	Released: March 2010; Label: Ngaiire

=== Singles ===
==== As lead artist ====
Title	Year	Peak chart positions	Album
Title	Year	AUS Urban	Album
"Luv Sa Giaman" (translation: "Love Tells Lies")	2005	—	Non-album single
"Song for No One"	2007	—	Song for No One
"Glorious"	2008	—	Song for No One
"Two Minds"	2010	—	Two Minds
"Filthy"	2011	—	Non-album single
"Dirty Hercules"	2013	—	Lamentations
"Around"	2013	—	Lamentations
"Broken Wings" (with Nick Wales)	2014	—	Around the Block
"Once"	2015	—	Blastoma
"Love Is a Battlefield"	2016	—	War & Peace
"Diggin'"	2016	23	Blastoma
"House on a Rock"	2016	—	Blastoma
"Shiver"	2019	—	3
"Boom"	2020	—	3
"Shiver"	2021	—	3
"Him"	2021	—	3
"L'Idole Des Jeunes"	2022	—	So Frenchy, So Chic
"Fuschia"	2022	—	Non-album singles
"Found"	2022	—	Non-album singles
"F.U."	2022	—	Non-album singles
"Sweet Disposition" (with Budjerah and Gretta Ray)	2022	—	Non-album singles
"Real Love" (with Sleepy Tom)	2023	—	This Thing Called Life
"Once" (with Sydney Symphony Orchestra)	2024	—	Live at the Sydney Opera House
"I'm a Woman"	2024	—	Ladies in Black
"Unstoppable" (with Tina Arena)	2026	—	Red Cross Lifeblood

==== As featured artist ====
List of singles, with year released, selected chart positions, and album name shown
Title	Year	Peak chart positions	Album
Title	Year	AUS	Album
"It's Not Me, It's You" (Paul Mac featuring Ngaiire)	2005	— (Note: "It's Not Me, It's You" did not enter the Top 100, but peaked at number 8 on the ARIA Club Tracks.)	Panic Room
"Coward" (Kilter featuring Ngaiire)	2014	—	Shade
"My Boo" (Flume featuring Vince Staples, Kučka, Vera Blue, and Ngaiire)	2016	—	Non-album single
"My Own Mystery" (Lanks featuring Ngaiire)	2017	—	TwentySeven
"Fly" (Birdz featuring Ngaiire)	2021	—	Legacy
"Perfect Love" (Dan Azzo featuring Ngaiire)	2024	—	
"On My Way" (Moss featuring Ngaiire)	2025	—	

==== Other appearances ====
Title	Year	Album
"West Papua" (George Telek featuring Ngaiire)	2010	Akave
"Oxymoron" (The Tongue featuring Ngaiire)	2010	Alternative Energy
"Sick of It All" (The Tongue featuring Ngaiire)	2010	Alternative Energy
"Mystery to Me" (PaulMac featuring Ngaiire)	2015	Holiday From Me
"Exit Strategy" (PaulMac featuring Ngaiire)	2015	Holiday From Me
"Someone Else" (PaulMac featuring Ngaiire)	2015	Holiday From Me
"Murawina" (The Strides featuring Ngaiire)	2015	The Youth, the Rich & the Fake
"Rasta Live" (The Strides featuring Ngaiire)	2015	The Youth, the Rich & the Fake
"Firearms" (The Strides featuring Ngaiire)	2015	The Youth, the Rich & the Fake
"One for One" (The Strides featuring Ngaiire)	2015	The Youth, the Rich & the Fake
"One Heart" (The Strides featuring Ngaiire)	2015	The Youth, the Rich & the Fake
"Never Going Down" (The Tongue featuring Ngaiire)	2015	Hard Feelings
"Kilter" (Triple J Like a Version) (Ice Cream featuring Ngaiire)	2015	Like a Version (Volume Eleven)
"Cupid's Cheese" (Jordan Rakei featuring Ngaiire)	2016	Cloak
"The Less I Know the Better" (Triple J Like a Version)	2016	Like a Version (Volume Twelve)
"Can't Stop" (Danny G Felix featuring Ngaiire)	2016	Danny G Felix Project
"Ain't Nothing Going on But the Rent" (Lancelot featuring Ngaiire)	2017	J.O.B.
"True" (Lancelot featuring Ngaiire)	2017	J.O.B.
"All in for You" (Alice Ivy featuring Ngaiire)	2020	Don't Sleep
"Higher" (Budjerah featuring Ngaiire)	2021	Budjerah (Live at Rainbow Valley)
"Lose Sleep" (Urthboy featuring Ngaiire)	2023	Saviour

== Awards and nominations ==
=== AIR Awards ===
The Australian Independent Record Awards is an annual awards night to recognise, promote and celebrate the success of Australia's Independent Music sector.

Year	Nominee / work	Award	Result	Ref.
2017	Blastomia	Best Independent Album	Nominated	
2022	3	Best Independent Pop Album or EP	Nominated	

=== APRA Awards ===
The APRA Awards are presented annually from 1982 by the Australasian Performing Right Association (APRA), "honouring composers and songwriters". They commenced in 1982.

Year	Nominee / work	Award	Result	Ref.
2022	"Closer" (Ngaiire, Jack Grace, Gabriel Strum)	Song of the Year	Shortlisted	

=== ARIA Music Awards ===
The ARIA Music Awards is an annual ceremony presented by Australian Recording Industry Association (ARIA), which recognise excellence, innovation, and achievement across all genres of the music of Australia. They commenced in 1987.

Year	Nominee / work	Award	Result	Ref.
2021	3	Best Artist	Nominated	
2021	3	Breakthrough Artist	Nominated	
2021	3	Best Soul/R&B Release	Nominated	
2021	Ngaiire Joseph & Dan Segal 3	Best Cover Art	Nominated	

=== Australian Women in Music Awards ===
The Australian Women in Music Awards is an annual event that celebrates outstanding women in the Australian Music Industry who have made significant and lasting contributions in their chosen field. They commenced in 2018.

Year	Nominee / work	Award	Result	Ref.
2018	Ngaiire	Songwriter Award	Nominated	
2018	Ngaiire	Artistic Excellence Award	Won	
2019	Ngaiire	Diversity in Music Award	Nominated	
2019	Ngaiire	Songwriter Award	Nominated	
2019	Ngaiire	Artistic Excellence Award	Nominated	

=== J Awards ===
The J Awards are an annual series of Australian music awards that were established by the Australian Broadcasting Corporation's youth-focused radio station Triple J. They commenced in 2005.

Year	Nominee / work	Award	Result	Ref.
2016	herself	Double J Artist of the Year	Nominated	
2021	Ngaiire	Double J Artist of the Year	Nominated	

=== National Live Music Awards ===
The National Live Music Awards (NLMAs) commenced in 2016 to recognise contributions to the live music industry in Australia.

Year	Nominee / work	Award	Result	Ref.
2016	Ngaiire	Live Voice of the Year	Won	
2016	Ngaiire	Live R&B or Soul Act of the Year	Won	
2016	Ngaiire	NSW Live Voice of the Year	Won	
2017	Ngaiire	Live R&B or Soul Act of the Year	Won	
2017	Ngaiire	People's Choice - Best Live Voice of the Year	Nominated	
2020	Ngaiire	Live Voice of the Year	Nominated	
2020	Ngaiire	NSW Live Voice of the Year	Nominated	
2023	Ngaiire	Best Live Voice	Nominated	
2023	Ngaiire	Best R&B or Soul Act	Nominated	
2023	Ngaiire	Best Live Act in NSW	Nominated	
