= Holiday From Me =

Studio album by Paul Mac
- Released: 10 April 2015
- Recorded: The Panic Room, Sydney
- Genres: Dance-pop; house
- Label: Eleven
- Producer: PaulMac

Paul Mac chronology
Panic Room (2005)	Holiday From Me (2015)	Mesmerism (2019)

Singles from Holiday From Me
- 1. "State of War" Released: February 2015

"Holiday From Me" is the third studio album by Australian singer-songwriter and music producer Paul Mac. It was released on 10 April 2015, almost ten years since his last album. The album was launched by throwing a party on a secret train trip in Sydney on 8 April. He took hundreds of guests from Central Station to Cronulla, where he took over a venue and played his new record in full, featuring guest performances from those featured on the release.

== Background and Context ==
Since the release of Panic Room in 2005, Mac has been working with Daniel Johns and touring with Silverchair, remixing and DJing with Jonny Seymour as Stereogamous, composing film scores and soundtracks for many Australian films including Kath and Kimderella, Beautiful and Hey Hey It's Esther Blueburger and developing new music for dance productions as well as his own tours. In between that, he'd return to Sydney to write and record new music. He was writing sketches while in tour buses and hotel rooms, and from there he started looking for people to collaborate with and began to record demos. "I ask people that I really like to help out. Sometimes I come up with a really good verse but no chorus yet, or a good chorus but no verse, so I just invite people I really like to get involved... I guess I don't work with people I don't like, or people I think are fake. So I kinda adore everybody on the album because I really believe in them as musicians." Paul describes the album as very "break up-y", as he explored ways to express how he felt about his own breakup during the early stages of the album.

Holiday From Me thematises escape and transcendence, yet PaulMac's desire was for it to have depth. "So many songs on the radio are written for 16-year-old girls, essentially, and often I think the emotional side of the lyric is really simple. Generally, it's like a tantrum of, ‘You’re fucked and I’m amazing.’ It's really one-sided." "Someone Else" is a gracious response to getting 'dumped' by a boyfriend. "The lyrics come from a much more mature space of what life is and what love is and what's important and what isn't important."

== Reviews ==
Katie Cunningham of Rolling Stone Australia gave the album 3 out of 5 saying "Four years in the making, Mac's brought on board a formidable collection of guest vocalists and co-producers" adding "Holiday From Me is a welcome return."

Brad from AuspOp said "Holiday From Me does not buy into shrinking its songs into a radio friendly four minutes. Some of the tracks don't even contain vocals until halfway into proceedings" adding "if you can forgive some minor indulgences in regards to song length, Holiday From Me is a nice little romp from one of our great DJs. It's constantly changing shape around the listener, avoiding the mindless repetition that stain many a DJ's album release"

Mac McNaughton from The Music gave the album 2 out of 5, saying "His first solo album in ten years so craves to be pulsating from the windows of the nation's proudest queer venues. Alas, here, he's simply nostalgically unprogressive."

David James Young from The Brag gave the album 3.5 out of 5 saying "the famed Sydney producer has come out of exile with a batch of boisterous, bubbling and occasionally brilliant pop-flirting dance tracks."

== Track listing ==
1. "Holiday From Me" (featuring Kira Puru) – 5:46
2. "Inside Outerspace" (featuring Benjamin Fraser) – 7:55
3. "State of War" (featuring Kira Puru and Goodwill) – 4:56
4. "Idiot" (featuring Megan Washington) – 3:30
5. "Mystery to Me" (featuring Ngaiire) – 5:04
6. "Exit Strategy" (featuring Ngaiire) – 5:57
7. "My Friend" (featuring Shaun J Wright and Stereogamous) – 6:03
8. "Anechoic" (featuring Tim Derricourt) – 4:42
9. "Someone Else" (with Ngaiire) – 4:18
10. "Faq" (featuring Brendan McLean and Nathan Hudson) – 5:30
11. "Not Even Jesus" (featuring Dave Mason) – 4:41

== Charts ==
Chart (2015)	Peak position
Australian Charts (ARIA)	118
