= Angel Blood (album) =

Studio album by Leonardo's Bride
- Released: 28 April 1997
- Length: 50:01
- Label: Mushroom Records
- Producer: Justin Stanley

Leonardo's Bride chronology
Temperamental Friend (1994)	Angel Blood (1997)	Open Sesame (2000)

Singles from Angel Blood
- 1. "So Brand New" Released: 1996; 2. "Even When I'm Sleeping" Released: June 1997; 3. "Buddha Baby" Released: 1995

Angel Blood is the debut studio album released by Australian pop group, Leonardo's Bride. The album peaked at number 25 on the ARIA Charts and was certified gold.

At the ARIA Music Awards of 1997, the album was nominated for Breakthrough Artist – Album and Best Cover Art.

== Track listing ==
1. "Even When I'm Sleeping" - 3:52
2. "Buzz" - 2:56
3. "So Brand New" - 4:24
4. "Kissing Bedrock" - 3:12
5. "Stay" - 3:19
6. "Hey Hey" - 3:56
7. "Forty-One False Starts" - 3:30
8. "Titanic" - 4:08
9. "Problematic Art of Conversation" - 3:46
10. "Fall" - 5:19
11. "Wednesday" - 4:00
12. "Buddha Baby" - 4:00

== Charts ==
=== Weekly charts ===
Chart (1997)	Peak position
Australian Albums (ARIA)	25
New Zealand Albums (RMNZ)	35

=== Year-end charts ===
Chart (1997)	Position
Australia (ARIA)	96

== Certifications ==
Region	Certification	Certified units/sales
Australia (ARIA)	Gold	35,000^{^}
^{^} Shipments figures based on certification alone.

== Release history ==
Region	Date	Label	Format	Catalogue
Australia	28 April 1997	Mushroom Records	CD	MUSH24644.2
