= Blastoma (album) =

Studio album by Ngaiire
- Released: 10 June 2016
- Length: 39:21
- Label: Maximillion Brown, Sony
- Producer: Ngaire Joseph, Paul Mac and Jack Grace

Ngaiire chronology
Lamentations (2013)	Blastoma (2016)	3 (2021)

Singles from Blastoma
- 1. "Once" Released: 10 July 2015; 2. "Diggin'" Released: 26 February 2016; 3. "House on a Rock" Released: 25 May 2016

Blastoma is the second studio album by Papua New Guinea-born Australian-based singer Ngaiire, released on 10 June 2016. The album is named blastoma; a form of cancer Ngaiire battled at a young age. The album peaked at number 41 on the ARIA Charts.

== Reception ==
Professional ratings
Review scores
Source	Rating
The AU Review	8.7/10

Sosefina Fuamoli from The AU Review said "Ngaiire continues to explore a diverse musical palette on Blastoma, incorporating gritty electronics with some well produced hints of trip-hop and of course, that soul-soaked R&B vocal throughout. She shifts between the glossy and the raw with skill, allowing the listener to access this sonic environment she’s meticulously established before coming at us fast with evocative lyricism and music that hits right to your core."

Alex Watts from Beat Magazine commented on the spareness saying "with most tracks featuring Ngaiire’s voice prominent in the mix, and very simple electronic rhythmic and synth elements holding the tracks together."

Tom Williams from Music Feeds said the album "speaks of emotional pain, but also physical stress — bodies breaking, bodies tearing, skin being shed — all against backdrops of ice, hard rock, lost faith and graves being dug" adding "Blastoma shines when these themes and images are put up against harsh synths, belly-aching bass lines and rolling percussion."

== Track listing ==
No.	Title	Length
1.	"Anchor"	3:29
2.	"Once"	5:12
3.	"Cruel" (featuring Jack Grace)	5:12
4.	"House on a Rock"	3:42
5.	"I Wear Black"	4:16
6.	"Diggin'"	4:39
7.	"I Can't Hear God Anymore"	4:24
8.	"Many Things"	3:35
9.	"Fall Into My Arms"	4:57

== Charts ==
Chart (2016)	Peak position
Australian Albums (ARIA)	41

== Release history ==
Region	Date	Format	Label	Catalogue
Australia	10 June 2016	CD; digital download; streaming	Maximillion Brown, Sony Music Australia	MB00001
Worldwide	10 June 2016	CD; digital download; streaming	The Orchard	5063432
