= Andy Rantzen =

Australian musician

Andrew Rantzen is a Sydney-based lo-fi electronic recording artist and writer. Trained as a psychologist, he has been lecturer and tutor at the University of Sydney. He is most well known as part of the duo Itch-E and Scratch-E along with Paul Mac (Boo Boo & Mace is another alias for the same duo). He has produced remixes for Severed Heads, INXS and The Wiggles, and has done soundtrack work for the film Sample People. He also records with the Pelican Daughters. In 2001 he released his first solo LP, The Blue Hour.
