= Milwaukee Banks =

Electronic hip-hop duo from Melbourne, Australia

- Origin: Melbourne, Victoria, Australia
- Years active: 2013-present
- Label: Dot Dash
- Members: Edo; Dyl Thomas

Milwaukee Banks are an Australian electronic hip-hop duo from Melbourne. The members are Edo (producer) and Dyl Thomas (vocals).They emerged in late 2013 with the release of their first song, Pluto Bounce, which premiered on Interview Magazine

In June 2014, Milwaukee Banks released their debut EP, The Rose Water. This was followed up with a remix EP, featuring remixes by Australian artists of all the songs from Rose Water.

In late 2014, they released a pair of collaborative tracks, produced by Australian artists Andrei Eremin and Rat & Co.

In 2014, the group was nominated for Best Emerging Artist in the Music Victoria Awards of 2014. In 2015, Milwaukee Banks won a competition through Triple J Unearthed to perform at the St. Jeromes Laneway Festival.

In March 2016, Milwaukee Banks released their debut album, Deep into the Night.

== Discography ==
=== Studio albums ===
Title	Details
Deep into the Night	Released: 18 March 2016; Label: Dot Dash (DASH036); Format: CD, LP, Digital download

=== Extended plays ===
Title	Details
Rose Water	Released: 13 June 2014; Label: Milwaukee Banks; Format: CD, DD
Rose Water Remixes	Released: 5 November 2014; Label: Milwaukee Banks; Format: CD, DD

=== Singles ===
Title	Year	Album
"Pluto Bounce"	2014	Rose Water
"Sweater Made of Gold"	2014	Rose Water
"Van Gogh" / "Monitor"	2014	non album singles
"Faded"	2015	non album singles
"Reincarnated"	2016	non album singles
"The City"	2017	No Time
"Lights Down" (featuring Sophiegrophy)	2017	No Time
"Carried Away" (with KLP)	2018	non album single
"Coming for You"	2018	No Time

== Awards and nominations ==
=== AIR Awards ===
The Australian Independent Record Awards (commonly known informally as AIR Awards) is an annual awards night to recognise, promote and celebrate the success of Australia's Independent Music sector.

Year	Nominee / work	Award	Result
2017	Deep into the Night	Best Independent Hip Hop/Urban Album	Nominated
2019	No Time	Best Independent Hip Hop/Urban Album	Nominated

=== Music Victoria Awards ===
The Music Victoria Awards are an annual awards night celebrating Victorian music.

Year	Nominee / work	Award	Result
2014	Themselves	Best Emerging Artist	Nominated
