= 65 Roses (song) =

2001 song by Lee J Collier

Song by Lee J Collier

from the album Don't Call Me Madam or I'll Send You an Invoice!
- Released: 2001
- Recorded: 2001
- Genre: Country
- Songwriter: Lee J Collier

"65 Roses" is a 2001 song about cystic fibrosis written and performed by Australian singer Lee J Collier. The song is about a young girl who cannot pronounce "cystic fibrosis", instead calling it "sixty-five roses", only to learn the correct pronunciation when she grows older. The song won Collier the New Songwriters Award at the 2002 Tamworth Songwriters Awards.

Australian band Wolverines recorded a version of the song in 2001 with several lyric changes, and it was released as a single. Due to promotional complications between LJ Hooker (a sponsor of Cystic Fibrosis Australia) and the Australian Recording Industry Association (ARIA), the song stalled at number 23 on the ARIA Singles Chart in July. A re-release in 2002 failed to make a significant impact in Australia, but in New Zealand, the single reached number one in May, becoming the band's only hit outside Australia.

== Background and lyrics ==
"65 Roses" was written by Australian singer Lee J Collier in 2001. The song is about a young girl who is told by her parents that her older sister has cystic fibrosis. However, she misunderstands the condition's name and calls it "sixty-five roses" instead. This leads her to believe that flowers are causing her sister's fatigue and breathlessness, which baffles her. When she gets older, she finally begins to understand her sister has "cystic fibrosis", not "sixty-five roses", and why her parents were teary-eyed when they told her about the condition. Realising the truth, the girl wishes her sister had roses instead.

Collier's original version was praised by many organisations, and she received numerous awards, including the Tamworth Songwriters Association Award for Songwriter of the Year and Contemporary Country Song of the Year, in 2002. The song was later included on her album Don't Call Me Madam or I'll Send You An Invoice!, and she has performed the song at many cystic fibrosis fundraisers.

== Wolverines version ==
"65 Roses"

Single by Wolverines

from the album Wolverines & Roses
- B-side: "Can Somebody Help"
- Released: 18 June 2001
- Recorded: 2001
- Length: 4:21
- Label: Capitol, EMI
- Songwriters: Lee J Collier, Wolverines
- Producer: Wolverines

Shortly after Collier released "65 Roses", John Clinton, vocalist and drummer of Australian country rock band Wolverines, decided to record a cover of the song due to his sister (and most of his family) suffering from cystic fibrosis. A few of the lyrics were changed, and the narrator of the song is now a boy. It too was released in 2001, on 18 June, with Clinton intending to raise money for cystic fibrosis research. In 2002, the song appeared on their album Wolverines & Roses.

=== Charting controversy ===
Although the cover became a hit in Australia, it encountered several problems that prevented it from entering the upper reaches of Australia's official music ranking, the ARIA Singles Chart. Clinton believed one of the reasons the song underperformed was because someone from a major record label complained about the song and the band to ARIA, although he was unsure of who did it.

Another reason "65 Roses" underperformed commercially was due to a technicality in ARIA's chart methodology. The song received support from LJ Hooker, an Australian real estate group that sponsors Cystic Fibrosis Australia. Due to the group's heavy involvement in the single's promotion, including sending memos to its other major franchises encouraging them to buy the single, ARIA treated this as insider trading, so any sales involving these organisations did not register on the ARIA Singles Chart, greatly upsetting Clinton and Cystic Fibrosis Australia's chief executive at the time, Terry Stewart. As a result of these neglected sales, "65 Roses" stalled at number 23 on the ARIA Singles Chart and spent three weeks in the top 50.

=== Chart performance ===
The Wolverines' version of "65 Roses" debuted on the ARIA Singles Chart at number 38 on 15 July 2001. The next week, the single rose 13 places to number 25, then reached its peak of number 23 the following week. However, as a possible result of the song's discarded sales following the involvement of LJ Hooker, it dropped out of the chart on 5 August.

"65 Roses" was re-released in 2002, but it did not replicate the success of the original release in Australia, reaching number 95 in February. However, in New Zealand, the single debuted at number one on the RIANZ Singles Chart on the week of 26 May, becoming the only Wolverines song to experience success outside Australia. It dropped to number 40 after peaking, then left the chart altogether. The song has received a gold certification in both Australia and New Zealand.

=== Awards and nominations ===
Year	Nominee / work	Award	Result
2002	APRA Music Awards of 2002	Most Performed Country Work	Nominated
2002	Golden Guitar Awards of 2002	Vocal Group or Duo of the Year	Won

=== Charts ===
Chart (2001)	Peak position
Australia (ARIA)	23

Chart (2002)	Peak position
Australia (ARIA)	95
New Zealand (Recorded Music NZ)	1

=== Certifications ===
Region	Certification	Certified units/sales
Australia (ARIA)	Gold	35,000^{^}
New Zealand (RMNZ)	Gold	5,000^{*}
^{*} Sales figures based on certification alone.^{^} Shipments figures based on certification alone.

== See also ==
- Cystic fibrosis
- List of number-one singles from the 2000s (New Zealand)
