= 3 (Ngaiire album) =

Studio album by Ngaiire
- Released: 27 August 2021
- Length: 33:08
- Label: Dot Dash; Majestic Casual
- Producer: Ngaiire Joseph; Jack Grace

Ngaiire chronology
Blastoma (2016)	3 (2021)	Live at the Sydney Opera House (2024)

Singles from 3
- 1. "Shiver" Released: 4 October 2019; 2. "Boom" Released: 13 March 2020; 3. "Closer" Released: 20 May 2021; 4. "Him" Released: 15 July 2021

3 is the third studio album by Papua New Guinea-born Australian-based singer Ngaiire, released on 27 August 2021.

At the 2021 ARIA Music Awards, the album was nominated for Best Soul/R&B Release and Breakthrough Artist - Release, Ngaiire was nominated for Best Artist. Ngaiire Joseph & Dan Segal were nominated for Best Cover Art for their work on this release.

At the AIR Awards of 2022, the album was nominated for Best Independent Pop Album or EP.

== Background and release ==
According to Ngaiire's mission statement, the process of creating 3 started in 2017 with the aim of "extracting unique visual aspects of my culture to present in a contemporary context".

The album was announced on 20 May 2021 alongside the album's third single "Closer" In an announcement, Ngaiire said "The project was meant to deconstruct people's misconceptions of what a Papua New Guinean is because of how I constantly had to field useless enquiries from white people who wanted to know if we all still ate people or why I was so pretty for a Papua New Guinean." Ngaiire stated that the album "is about letting go and accepting that everyone isn't going to get me". Ngaiire also told The Music this album is about just three things - herself, the people she loves and the country.

== Singles ==
"Shiver" was released on 4 October 2019. Ngaiire said "It's about my Aine (grandmother) and how I interact with her memory posthumously. In all the mystery of the afterlife, it's also about the comfort of knowing your ancestors or those that have come before you are still holding you down from the other side." The song was nominated in the Vanda & Young Global Songwriting Competition.

"Boom" was released on 13 March 2020. Ngaiire said "'Boom' is about all that drama and lust – the glutton of sex and adultery and the debauchery that comes with sexual suppression and colonisation."

"Closer" was released on 20 May 2020. The song is described by Ngaiire as a "sweaty 80s summer love song". The track reflects on how Ngaiire viewed love, sex and dating while growing up in post-colonial Papua New Guinea.

"Him" was released on 15 July 2021 as the album's fourth single. Ngaiire said "It's about a deeply personal conversation that no one dreams of having with the people they love. It's about the legacy of love."

== Critical reception ==
Professional ratings
Review scores
Source	Rating
The Guardian	3/5 stars
The Music	4/5 stars

David James Young from NME Australia said "Though she has never shied from drawing from her own experiences and convictions in the past, Ngaiire's third studio album may well be her most personal yet. The neo-soul artist has crafted an immersive and heartfelt record that touches upon issues of intimacy, diaspora and motherhood. A remarkable, self-assured effort."

Shaad D'Souza from The Guardian said "Tying electronic pop with older traditions, Ngaiire's new release is bright, alive and soulful, reaching back to her roots as it looks to the future"

Guido Farnell from The Music said "Placing her life under the microscope to find lyrical inspiration yields tunes about her dreams, hopes and passions and sees Ngaiire boldly representing everything that she is about. A touch introspective, this album grooves gently to sound of synth heavy arrangements that feel as smooth as audio silk."

Sydney News called it "A richly produced set of electronic soul songs" and "a pleasure to explore."

== Track listing ==
3 track listing
No.	Title	Writer(s)	Length
1.	"3"		1:38
2.	"Shiver"	Ngaiire Joseph; Jack Britten; Lanks	4:10
3.	"Shoestring"		3:41
4.	"Closer"	Joseph; Britten; Gab Strum	3:04
5.	"Takeover"		3:45
6.	"Moonshine"		3:28
7.	"Akura"		1:28
8.	"Him"	Joseph; Britten	3:46
9.	"Boom"	Joseph; Britten; Mookhi	4:22
10.	"Glitter"		3:46
Total length:			33:08

== Charts ==
Chart performance for 3
Chart (2021)	Peak position
Australian Albums (ARIA)	32

== Release history ==
Release history for 3
Region	Date	Format	Label	Catalogue
Australia	27 August 2021	LP; digital download; streaming	Dot Dash	DASH075LP
