= Just the Thing =

Single by Paul Mac featuring Peta Morris

from the album 3000 Feet High
- Released: 4 June 2001
- Studio: The Grooveyard, Sydney
- Length: 3:54
- Label: Eleven: A Music Company
- Songwriter: Paul Mac
- Producer: Paul Mac

Paul Mac singles chronology
"Heatseeking Pleasure Machine" (2001)	"Just the Thing" (2001)	"The Sound of Breaking Up" (2001)

Music video
- "Just the Thing" on YouTube

"Just the Thing" is a song recorded by Australian singer-songwriter and music producer Paul Mac and features the vocals of Peta Morris. The song was released in June 2001 as the second single from Mac's debut studio album 3000 Feet High. "Just the Thing" peaked at number 17 on the Australian ARIA Charts and was certified gold.

At the ARIA Music Awards of 2001, the song was nominated for Best Male Artist and Best Dance Release. At the APRA Music Awards of 2002 the song won the APRA Award for Most Performed Dance Work.

== Reception ==
Nick Jarvis from in the Mix said "From the gospel intro to the tribal conga drums, driving bassline and diva vocals exploring themes of "love on the dancefloor", 'Just the Thing' takes a swathe of deep house and disco tropes and turns them into an indelible hands-in-the-air jam. What a hook, and what a voice; Paul Mac's most commercially successful single is an all-time funky house belter that's probably still getting thrashed on pub jukeboxes in regional towns".

== Track listing ==
1. "Just the Thing" – 3:54
2. "Just the Thing" (The Funk Corporation's Just The Verse remix) – 8:29
3. "See You Much Later" – 3:48
4. "Just the Thing" (Stephen Allkins with Stereogamous remix) – 7:58

== Charts ==
=== Weekly charts ===
Chart (2001)	Peak position
Australia (ARIA)	17

=== Year-end charts ===
Chart (2001)	Position
Australian Charts (ARIA)	79
Australian Artist Charts (ARIA)	6
Australian Dance (ARIA)	7

== Certification ==
Region	Certification	Certified units/sales
Australia (ARIA)	Gold	35,000^{^}
^{^} Shipments figures based on certification alone.

== Release history ==
Country	Date	Format	Label	Catalogue
Australia	4 June 2001	CD Single	Eleven: A Music Company	elevencd3
