= Live at the Sydney Opera House (Ngaiire album) =

Live album by Ngaiire with Sydney Symphony Orchestra
- Released: 26 April 2024
- Recorded: 10 November 2022
- Venue: Sydney Opera House
- Length: 61:55
- Label: Dot Dash

Ngaiire chronology
| 3 (2021) | Live at the Sydney Opera House (2024) |

Singles from Live at the Sydney Opera House
- 1. "Once" Released: 9 February 2024

Live at the Sydney Opera House is the first live album by Australian-based R&B singer Ngaiire with Sydney Symphony Orchestra. The album was announced in February 2024 alongside its lead single. The album was recorded during their sold-out performance in November 2022 which celebrated the Opera House's 50th anniversary and consists of orchestral arrangements of tracks from across her career.

To celebrate the release, Ngaiire returned to the Opera House on 4 May 2024 for a one-off concert.

== Track listing ==
1. "Prelude" – 3:46
2. "Shiver" – 4:15
3. "Once" – 5:09
4. "House on a Rock" – 3:50
5. "Shoestring" – 3:46
6. "Moonshine" – 3:40
7. "The Less I Know the Better" – 4:37
8. "Interlude 1" – 3:10
9. "Ordinary" – 4:04
10. "Dirty Hercules" – 4:17
11. "Interlude 2" – 0:58
12. "Diggin'" – 4:39
13. "Fuchsia" – 3:48
14. "Fall Into My Arms" – 6:50
15. "Glitter" – 5:06

== Charts ==
Chart performance for Live at the Sydney Opera House
| Chart (2024) | Peak position |
|---|---|
| Australian Independent Albums (AIR) | 16 |
