= Itch-E and Scratch-E =

Australian electronic music group

- Also known as: Boo Boo & Mace!, Boo Boo Mace 'n' Nutcase
- Origin: Sydney, New South Wales, Australia
- Genres: Techno, house, electronica
- Years active: 1991–2001, 2010–current
- Labels: Second Nature/Volition, Hussy/Ministry of Sound
- Members: Paul Mac; Andy Rantzen
- Past members: Sheriff Lindo

Itch-E and Scratch-E are an Australian electronic music group formed in 1991 by Paul Mac (a.k.a. Itch-E, Mace) and Andy Rantzen (a.k.a. Scratch-E, Boo Boo), both playing keyboards and samples. The duo recorded as Boo Boo & Mace! during the late 1990s. At times they have included a third member, Sheriff Lindo (a.k.a. Nutcase), recording under the name Boo-Boo, Mace 'n' Nutcase. In 2001 they disbanded as Mac pursued his solo career. In 2010 the duo reunited as Itch-E and Scratch-E to release new material.

== History ==
In 1991 Itch-E and Scratch-E were formed in Sydney by Paul Mac (as Itch-E) on keyboards and samples (ex-Smash Mac Mac, The Lab) and Andy Rantzen (as Scratch-E) also on keyboards and samples (ex-Pelican Daughters). Their name refers to United States cartoon show, The Simpsons' characters, Itchy and Scratchy, as well as the drug, ecstasy or E. According to Jody Macgregor of AllMusic the name "certainly suggests that the idea of forming a techno duo started as a laugh." The duo were often joined for live shows by Sheriff "Dub Man" Lindo.

They initially performed a techno sound which drew on early bleep techno as well as influenced by fellow Sydney-based, Severed Heads (Tom Ellard of that group had helped produce an album by Mac's earlier band, The Lab, which was never released). The melodic influence of Mac, trained in classical music, gave them a distinctive sound which eventually led to pop success. One of their demos led to the band signing with Volition Records' label, Second Nature. Their debut mini-album, Irritable, was released in August 1992.

The group released the album Itch-E Kitch-E Koo in October 1993. It was recorded at two Sydney studios, The Lab and Masking Tapes, with Mac and Rantzen as producers. Kristian Hatton of Haarp Media, in July 2015, listed the album as one of his Top 100 Albums in Niche Electronic Music, and explained "[it] showed that electronic music in our country – although always influenced by America and Europe – could gain attention from a mainstream audience despite being from the underground."

The lead single from the album, "Sweetness and Light", was released in May 1994, and was co-written with Justin Brandis (of Pelican Daughters). It became their best-known work, and peaked at #65 on the ARIA Singles Chart. At that time grunge was more popular than rave music: "grunge was introspective and depressive, rave was quite the opposite. It was still gritty, but its core message was utopian: peace, love and unity." The track was listed in twenty-first place on the Triple J Hottest 100, 1994. At the ARIA Music Awards of 1995 they won the inaugural Best Dance Release category. When Mac accepted he declared "We'd like to thank all of Sydney's ecstasy dealers, without whom this award would not be possible." Although this was bleeped out of the TV broadcast, a sponsor of the awards, the National Drug Offensive, withdrew their funding.

In January 1995 Itch-E and Scratch-E released the album Itch-E and Scratch-E... and Friends, which Australian musicologist, Ian McFarlane, described as a "sprawling double album... which covered the gamut of electronic dance." According to McFarlane the friends appearing on the album included Crackerjack, a "high energy house" duo (with Mac); Event Horizon (comprising Lindo and Rantzen) which provided "funky bleeps"; Alien Headspace's "electronic jazz"; and Lindo's "hypnotic dub". They also released a single-only, "Howling Dog", which was nominated for Best Dance Release at the ARIA Music Awards of 1996. By the end of that year they had to change their name to Boo Boo & Mace! due to international acts of similar names.

As Boo Boo & Mace! the duo issued a studio album, Sublimely Pointless, in July 1998 on Prozaac Recordings. More than a year earlier they had released a CD single, "Flowers in the Sky" in February. At the ARIA Music Awards of 1997 it was nominated for Best Dance Release. They also remixed several songs by Australian children's group The Wiggles for the soundtrack of The Wiggles Movie, as "Wigglemix." With Lindo aboard, as Boo Boo Mace 'n' Nutcase they issued a single, "Gotta Move On", in November 1997. Additional singles by Boo Boo & Mace! followed in 1998. By 2001 the duo had reverted to Itch-E and Scratch-E and released another studio album, It Is What It Isn't (1 May 2001), but they disbanded in that year with Mac pursuing his solo career.

In January 2010 the duo announced on their MySpace page that they had reformed as Itch-E and Scratch-E. During that year they released another studio album, Hooray for Everything!!! (6 August 2010), and four singles, "Other Planets" (March), "r.E.f.r.E.s.h" (May), "Electric" (October) and "Back 2 the Jack" (December). Hooray for Everything!!! peaked at No. 23 on the ARIA Dance Albums chart.

In 2015, "Sweetness and Light" was listed at number 1 in In the Mix's '100 Greatest Australian Dance Tracks of All Time' with Nick Jarvis saying "Paul Mac and Andy Rantzen's greatest track symbolises the turning point when the previously underground rave scene suddenly stepped into the mainstream consciousness."

== Discography ==
=== Studio albums ===
Title	Album details
Irritable	Released: August 1992; Label: Second Nature/Volition Records (VoltCD47); Formats: CD, Cassette
Itch-E Kitch-E Koo	Released: October 1993; Label: Second Nature/Volition Records (VoltCD76); Formats: CD, Cassette
Itch-E and Scratch-E... and Friends	Released: 16 January 1995; Label: Second Nature/Volition Records (VoltCD96); Formats: CD
Credited as Boo Boo & Mace!
Sublimely Pointless	Released: July 1998; Label: Prozaac Recordings (dista-31062.2); Formats: CD
Credited as Itch-E and Scratch-E
It Is What It Isn't	Released: May 2001; Label: Creative Vibes (CVCD029); Formats: CD
Hooray for Everything	Released: August 2010; Label: Hussy Recordings/Ministry of Sound (HUSSYCD052); Formats: CD, Digital download

=== Singles ===
Title	Year	Peak chart positions
Title	Year	AUS
"Sweetness and Light"	1994	65
"Bouncing Chamber"	1995	-
"Howling Dog"	1996	-
Credited as Boo Boo & Mace!
"Flowers in the Sky"	1997	-
"Gotta Move On"	1997	-
"Seven Days" (featuring Jo Maskell)	1998	-
"Heartstrings"	1998	-
Credited as Itch-E and Scratch-E
"Other Planets" (featuring MDNA)	2010	-
"r.E.f.r.E.s.h" (featuring Scribe)	2010	-
"Electric" (featuring Kiss Reid of the Scare)	2010	-
"Back 2 the Jack"	2010	-
"Imperial Rockets"	2011	-

== Awards ==
=== ARIA Music Awards ===
The ARIA Music Awards is an annual awards ceremony that recognises excellence, innovation, and achievement across all genres of Australian music. Itch-E and Scratch-E have won one award from three nominations.

Year	Nominee / work	Award	Result
1995	"Sweetness and Light"	Best Dance Release	Won
1996	"Howling Dog"	Best Dance Release	Nominated
1997	"Flowers in the Sky"	Best Dance Release	Nominated
