= Lamentations (Ngaiire album) =

Studio album by Ngaiire
- Released: 12 July 2013
- Length: 36:44
- Label: Wantok Music
- Producers: Aaron Chulai; Tim Curnick

Ngaiire chronology
Two Minds (2010)	Lamentations (2013)	Blastoma (2016)

Singles from Lamentations
- 1. "Dirty Hercules" Released: 1 March 2013; 2. "Around" Released: 24 May 2013

Lamentations is the debut studio album by Papua New Guinea-born Australian-based singer Ngaiire, released on 12 July 2013. The album name was derived from two sources of inspiration; Dido's Lament, written by English Baroque composer Henry Purcell and performed in his opera Dido and Aeneas, and the Biblical and poetic Book of Lamentations, mourning the destructive fall of Jerusalem.

== Critical reception ==
Cameron Adams from The Daily Telegraph described the album as "electronic but soulful, innovative but accessible and a timeless mating of genres".

Rip It Up magazine called it "poignant" and "melancholic", as well as "invoking a sense of empathy and understanding".

The Music said "Infused with emotion and bursting with talent, Lamentations is a stunning work."

Lulu Ray from Happy Mag said the album "has a depth and darkness to its soundscape that is both unexpected and appreciated." An Amazon editor called the album "Beautiful and well-rounded... [and] a mature and evocative debut."

Sosefina Fuamoli from The AU Review called the album "a wild and eclectic fusion of soul, beats and R&B".

== Track listing ==
Lamentations track listing
No.	Title	Writer(s)	Length
1.	"Uranus"	Ngaire Joseph; Aaron Choulai	2:58
2.	"Around"	Joseph; Choulai; Tim Curnick; Niall Anderson; Evan Mannell	3:54
3.	"Count to Ten"	Joseph; Choulai	5:21
4.	"Fireflies"	Joseph	5:04
5.	"Abcd (For Ommo)"	Joseph; Choulai	4:09
6.	"Rabbit Hole"	Joseph; Moses Macrae	4:05
7.	"Dirty Hercules" (featuring Nai Palm)	Joseph; Marcello Maio; Barry Southgate	4:00
8.	"Novocaine"	Joseph	3:30
9.	"Ordinary" (featuring Brian Campeau and Elana Stone)	Joseph; Choulai	3:43
Total length:			36:44

== Release history ==
Release history and formats for Lamentations
Region	Date	Format	Label	Catalogue
Various	12 July 2013	CD; digital download; streaming	Wantok Music	W0010
