= Speedstar =

- Also known as: speedstar*
- Origin: Brisbane, Queensland, Australia
- Genre: Alternative rock
- Years active: 1995–2006
- Label: EMI
- Past members: Alister Bell; Richard Johnston; Dave Love; Ben Smith; Luke Sullivan

Speedstar (stylised as speedstar* pre-2004) were an Australian alternative rock band from Brisbane, Queensland formed in 1995. After a series of EPs, in 2002 they released their first album, Bruises You Can Touch, produced by Steve James. They followed it up with 2004's Forget the Sun, Just Hold On which was produced by Tony Doogan.

== Discography ==
=== Albums ===
List of albums, with selected details and chart positions
Title	Details	Peak chart positions
Title	Details	AUS
Bruises You Can Touch	Released: May 2002; Label: EMI	81
Forget the Sun, Just Hold On	Released: May 2004; Label: Capotol	59

=== EPs ===
List of EPs, with selected details and chart positions
Title	Details	Peak chart positions
Title	Details	AUS
Speedster / Falling Star	Released: June 2001; Label: EMI	119
Wishing Your Life Away	Released: November 2001; Label: EMI	93

=== Singles ===
List of singles, with selected chart positions
Title	Year	Chart positions
Title	Year	AUS
"Revolution"	2002	166
This Everyday Life"	2002	126
"Unbreakable"	2004	172
"Are You Feeling Better Angela?"	2005	202
