= The Wolverines (rock band) =

Australian country rock band

- Origin: Tamworth, New South Wales, Australia
- Genres: Country, country rock
- Years active: 1994–2021
- Labels: One Stop Country, ACMEC
- Members: Darcy Leyear; John Clinton; Chris Doyle
- Website: wolverines.com.au (last archived version)

The Wolverines were an Australian country rock band from Tamworth, New South Wales formed in 1994 by Darcy Leyear (guitar and vocals), John Clinton (drums and vocals), and Chris Doyle (keyboard and vocals). The band were active until 2021 and were known by some as "The Bad Boys of Country."

== About ==
The Wolverines started in Tamworth in 1994 and said the inspiration for their name was an encyclopaedia's description of a wolverine as "a short- snouted, blunt-headed, long- haired, heavy-set, nocturnal, eat- anything, almost-extinct animal viewed by some people as a pest."

Some of their songs have crass and sexual lyrics while others are heartfelt tributes. One of their hit songs, "65 Roses" written by Lee J. Collier, tells the story of a boy who could not pronounce "cystic fibrosis" - the condition which afflicted his sister. The Wolverines changed the original 3/4 country waltz song into 4/4 country rock. The single was released to raise awareness of the condition and fundraise for Cystic Fibrosis Australia.

They have performed at shows and festivals throughout Australia and the world, including 40,000 at the Gympie Muster, 10,000 kids at Tamworth Kids Charity Concert, participated in the Australian April Middle East Tour de Force in 2007 and 2008 and played for American Marines in Okinawa, Japan.

== Fundraising ==
=== Sail for Kids ===
In July 2003, The Wolverines sailed from Sydney to Whitsundays, stopping and playing at 14 ports, including Airlie Beach and Hamilton Island, along the way in their "The Wolverines Sail for CF Kids" tour, sponsored by LJ Hooker, fundraising for cystic fibrosis research. They concluded the tour having raised more than $35,000 and leaving it with the communities in which they had performed.

In 2007, The Wolverines repeated their "Wolverines Sail for Kids" from Sydney, up the coast to Cairns, ending at Silkwood in Far North Queensland. They anticipated stopping and playing at "all ports in between" to raise awareness and funds for less fortunate children along the coast. Starting on Friday, 6 July 2007 at the Cruising Yacht Club of Australia in Rushcutters Bay, Sydney, they sailed a 52-foot Beneteau north. Before each gig they gave a few disadvantaged children the opportunity to sail. At each stop, The Wolverines conducted a short auction to raise funds for a needy child or a local children's charity. One item regularly for auction was a signed, limited edition canvas print. They have also participated in the Tamworth Kids Charity Concert and Cystic Fibrosis Ball.

== Discography ==
=== Albums ===
| Title | Details |
|---|---|
| Party Album | Released: 1994 |
| Gonna Ride All Night Long | Released: 1996 |
| Feel the Need to Ride | Released: 1999 |
| Wolverines & Roses | Released: 2002 |
| Making Tracks | Released: 2004 |
| Good Times | Released: 2006 |
| Occasional Course Language | Released: 2008 |
| Good Ol' Boys | Released: 2011 |
| The Very Best of the Wolverines | Released: 2011 |

=== Charting singles ===
List of singles, with selected chart positions
| Title | Year | Peak chart positions | Certifications | Album |
| Title | Year | AUS | Certifications | Album |
|---|---|---|---|---|
| "65 Roses" | 2001 | 23 | ARIA: Gold | Wolverines & Roses |

== Awards ==
=== Country Music Awards of Australia ===
The Country Music Awards of Australia (CMAA) (also known as the Golden Guitar Awards) is an annual awards night held in January during the Tamworth Country Music Festival, celebrating recording excellence in the Australian country music industry. They have been held annually since 1973.

| Year | Nominee / work | Award | Result (wins only) |
|---|---|---|---|
| 2002 | Wolverines - "65 Roses" | Vocal Group or Duo of the Year | Won |

=== Mo Awards ===
The Australian Entertainment Mo Awards (commonly known informally as the Mo Awards), were annual Australian entertainment industry awards. They recognise achievements in live entertainment in Australia from 1975 to 2016. The Wolverines won four awards in that time.

| Year | Nominee / work | Award | Result (wins only) |
|---|---|---|---|
| 2001 | The Wolverines | Country Group of the Year | Won |
| 2002 | The Wolverines | Country Group of the Year | Won |
| 2003 | The Wolverines | Country Group of the Year | Won |
| 2007 | The Wolverines | Country Group of the Year | Won |
