= 3000 Feet High =

Studio album by Paul Mac
- Released: 6 August 2001
- Studio: Fibromajestic, Blue Mountains
- Genre: Dance-pop; house
- Label: Eleven
- Producer: Paul Mac

Paul Mac chronology
Paul Mac Presents Snapshots (1998)	3000 Feet High (2001)	Panic Room (2005)

Singles from 3000 Feet High
- 1. "Heatseeking Pleasure Machine" Released: 26 February 2001; 2. "Just the Thing" Released: 4 June 2001; 3. "The Sound of Breaking Up" Released: 29 October 2001; 4. "Gonna Miss You" Released: 18 March 2002; 5. "Stay" Released: 5 August 2002

3000 Feet High is the debut studio album by Australian singer-songwriter and music producer Paul Mac. It was released in August 2001 and peaked at No. 29 in Australia. It was nominated for three ARIA Music Awards and won one.

== Reception ==
In the Mix said 3000 Feet High is "a feast of eclectic sounds with its machinery-like clicks and beeps. It's quirky and funky and something that stays with you."

== Track listing ==
All tracks are written by PaulMac

3000 Feet High track listing
No.	Title	Vocals	Length
1.	"Above the Clouds"	Abby Dobson	4:48
2.	"Just the Thing"	Peta Morris	3:58
3.	"See You Much Later"	Peta Morris	3:45
4.	"The Sound of Breaking Up"	Peta Morris	3:25
5.	"Gonna Miss You"	Abby Dobson	3:59
6.	"Heatseeking Pleasure Machine"	Tex Perkins	3:36
7.	"Set You Free"	Peta Morris	5:46
8.	"Stay"	Jacqui Hunt	4:31
9.	"Post Jesus"	Jacqui Hunt	4:03
10.	"Everywhere I Go"	Elizabeth Martin	4:53
11.	"Rave Goodbye"		5:18
12.	"Disconnected"		4:19
13.	"The Making of 3000 Feet High" (video)
14.	"Just the Thing" (video)

== Charts ==
Chart performance for 3000 Feet High
Chart (2001)	Peak position
Australian Albums (ARIA)	29

== Certifications ==
Certifications for 3000 Feet High
Region	Certification	Certified units/sales
Australia (ARIA)	Gold	35,000^{^}
^{^} Shipments figures based on certification alone.

== ARIA Awards ==
The ARIA Music Awards are presented annually from 1987 by the Australian Recording Industry Association (ARIA).

Year	Nominee / work	Award	Result
2002	3000 Feet High	Best Dance Release	Won
2002	3000 Feet High	Best Male Artist	Nominated
2002	3000 Feet High	Engineer of the Year	Nominated
