= 3D World =

British 3D technology magazine

- Cover for the final issue (December 2024), featuring The Wild Robot
- Editor: Richard Hill
- Categories: Computer magazine, visual effects
- Frequency: Every four weeks, 13 per year
- Circulation: 8,052 (January - December 2016)
- Publisher: Stuart Anderton
- Founded: 2000
- Final issue: December 2024
- Company: Future plc
- Country: United Kingdom
- Based in: Bath
- Language: English
- Website: www.3dworldmag.com
- ISSN: 1470-4382

3D World is a magazine and website published by Future plc whose main focus is 3D animation, visual effects, video game design, illustration and architectural visualisation. 3D World appeared every four weeks and was sold in the UK, the US, in mainland Europe, Australia, New Zealand, South Africa and many other countries. It was also sold as a digital replica for tablet computers.

The magazine ceased publication after being shut down in October 2024.

== Regular content ==
- Exhibition: gallery of digitally created images submitted by readers.
- Pre-Viz: news from the computer-generated imagery industry.
- Feature: articles on a topic or project which have included areas such as open source software, film special effects, starting up a visual effects studio and machinima.
- Tutorials: software tutorials for various 2D, 3D and compositing packages.
- Q&A: includes "Question of the Month" and "Quick Question" where a team of industry specialists answer readers' questions on techniques to use in several software packages.
- Reviews: reviews on training materials, hardware and software.
