= Sweetness and Light (song) =

Single by Itch-E and Scratch-E

from the album Itch-E Kitch-E Koo
- Released: 2 May 1994
- Length: 4:04
- Label: Second Nature
- Songwriter(s): Paul Mac; Andy Rantzen; Justin Brandis; Miriam Williamson
- Producer(s): Paul Mac; Sheriff Lindo

Itch-E and Scratch-E singles chronology
"Sweetness and Light" (1994)	"Bouncing Chamber" (1995)

"Sweetness and Light" is a song recorded by Australian electronic music group Itch-E and Scratch-E. The song was released in May 1994 and peaked at number 65 on the Australian singles chart.

The group have later said they weren't sure if the song was good with Andy Rantzen saying "When we'd finished mixing 'Sweetness and Light' I said 'Hmm, this is a bit disappointing' and Paul replied 'I know, where did we go wrong?'

At the ARIA Music Awards of 1995, the song won the inaugural ARIA Award for Best Dance Release. In his acceptance speech, Paul Mac controversially declared "We'd like to thank all of Sydney's ecstasy dealers, without whom this award would not be possible." The televised version censored the speech, causing a media frenzy, but Mac was unrepentant, years later calling it "the best career move I ever made. I got in so much trouble for that, but I don't care. I'm still proud of it. I meant every word, and I still do."

== Reception ==
In 2015, "Sweetness and Light" was listed at number 1 in In the Mix's '100 Greatest Australian Dance Tracks of All Time' with Nick Jarvis saying "Paul Mac and Andy Rantzen's greatest track symbolises the turning point when the previously underground rave scene suddenly stepped into the mainstream consciousness."

== Track listings ==
1994 CD single

1. "Sweetness and Light" (Radio edit) - 4:04
2. "Sweetness and Light" (Fanatically Remixed By South End) - 5:45
3. "Sweetness and Light" (Sound & Suthers At the Controls) - 5:32
4. "Transcendental" (Alien Headspace's Ideal Forms remix) - 11:57

2012 Digital single

1. "Sweetness and Light" (Puddles remix)
2. "Sweetness and Light" (StephenFox remix)
3. "Sweetness and Light" (Bside's Long mix)
4. "Sweetness and Light" (Telafonica remix)
5. "Sweetness and Light" (Highly Dubious remix)
6. "Sweetness and Light" (Glowing Sugar remix)
7. "Sweetness and Light" (Vajra remix)

2017 Vinyl single

1. "Sweetness and Light"
2. "Sweetness and Light" (For Life remix)

== Charts ==
Chart (1994)	Peak position
Australia (ARIA)	65

== Release history ==
Country	Date	Format	Label	Catalogue
Australia	2 May 1994	CD Single, cassette single	Second Nature	voltcd86 / voltc86
Worldwide	16 Jul 2012	digital download	4-4-2 Music	
Australia	4 Aug 2017	12" vinyl	Motorik!	mtkxtcnrg003
