= Abby Dobson =

Australian singer and musician

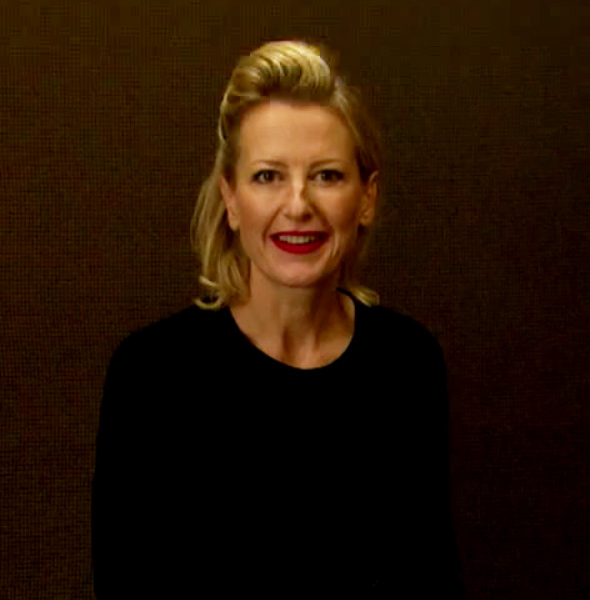

Background information
- Born: 1969 (age 56–57); Canberra, Australian Capital Territory, Australia
- Origin: Sydney, New South Wales, Australia
- Genre: Pop
- Occupation: Singer
- Years active: 1989–present
- Labels: Craving, Mushroom

Abby Dobson (born 1969) is an Australian singer and musician. Dobson was the lead vocalist for the pop band Leonardo's Bride.

In 2002, Dobson recorded the song "Don't Ask For More" for The Secret Life of Us volume 2 soundtrack compilation album released through Liberation Music. The following year, Dobson contributed the song "I'm Not Missing You" to The Secret Life of Us volume 3 soundtrack album.

Dobson has collaborated with musician Paul Mac on several tracks, including "Gonna Miss You" and "Above the Clouds" from the 2001 album 3000 Feet High and "The Beginning of the End Of Time" from the 2005 album Panic Room.

She appeared on i98fm with Lachlan Kitchen as part of the No. 1 rating morning show for the Illawarra and south coast of NSW. She also appeared on Australian television channel 31's music criticism program, Dancing About Architecture, in March 2009.

In 2013, Dobson auditioned for Season 2 of The Voice (Australia) but was unsuccessful.

Dobson has released two solo studio albums: Rise Up (2007) and It's Okay, Sweetheart (October 2018).

== Discography ==
=== Albums ===
List of albums
Title	Album details
Rise Up	Released: October 2007; Label: Craving Records (AD01); Format: CD
It's Okay, Sweetheart	Released: October 2018; Label: LilliPilli; Format: streaming, download

=== Singles ===
List of singles, with Australian chart positions
Title	Year	Peak chart positions	Album
Title	Year	AUS	Album
"Gonna Miss You" (Paulmac featuring Abby Dobson)	2002	62	3000 Feet High
"Let's Stay Together " (RockWiz featuring Abby Dobson & Rai Thistlethwayte)	2013	-	

=== Other appearances ===
List of other non-single song appearances
Title	Year	Album
"Don't Ask for More" (with Michael Jerome)	2001	Mushroom Music Writers' Bloc 2001
"Let It Go" (with Nicky Bomba)	2001	Mushroom Music Writers' Bloc 2001
"Christmas Medley '09" (with The Wolfgramm Sisters and Paris Wells)	2009	Rockwiz: The Christmas Album
"It's Only Love"	2010	I Love You Too (soundtrack)
