= Paul Mac =

Australian electropop musician, singer, producer, and remixer

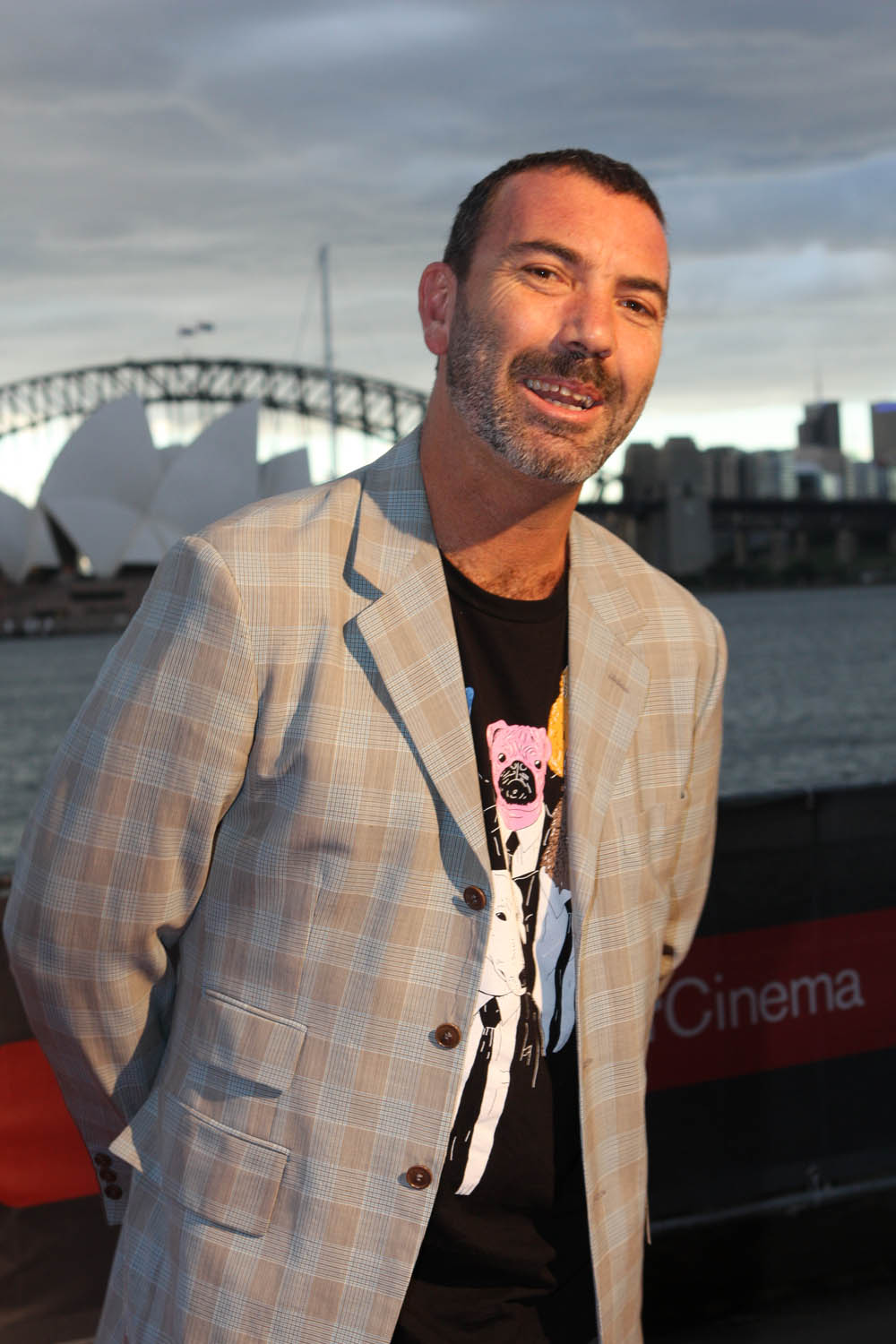
- Mac at Sydney Harbour in January 2012

Background information
- Born: Paul Francis McDermott; 17 September 1965 (age 61); Sydney, Australia
- Genres: Electropop, electronica
- Occupations: Musician, singer-songwriter
- Instruments: Piano, keyboards, samples
- Years active: 1986–present
- Labels: Second Nature, Volition, Interdance, Prozaac, Shock, Eleven, EMI
- Website: paulmac.com.au

Paul Francis McDermott (born 17 September 1965), who performs as Paul Mac, is an Australian electropop musician, singer-songwriter, producer and music re-mixer. He was classically trained at Sydney Conservatorium of Music. Mac has formed various bands including Smash Mac Mac (1986–88), The Lab (1989–1998), Itch-E and Scratch-E (1991–present), Boo Boo Mace & Nutcase (1996–98), and The Dissociatives (2003–2005). Mac has released two solo albums, 3000 Feet High (6 August 2001) and Panic Room (17 October 2005) – both appeared in the top 40 on the ARIA Albums Chart.

At the ARIA Music Awards of 2002 Mac won 'Best Dance Release' for 3000 Feet High and was nominated for 'Best Male Artist' and 'Engineer of the Year'. In June 2001 he released his highest-charting single, "Just the Thing", which featured lead vocals by Peta Morris. It reached No. 17 on the ARIA Singles Chart and at the APRA Music Awards of 2002 it won 'Most Performed Dance Work'.

Mac played with Severed Heads. He was also a touring member of Silverchair as well as recording piano parts for their album, Young Modern (March 2007), having worked with frontman Daniel Johns as The Dissociatives previously. He has provided remixes for Silverchair, Powderfinger, The Mark of Cain, Grinspoon, The Cruel Sea, INXS and Placebo. Mac has worked on soundtracks for Baz Luhrmann and on the films Head On and Sample People. He was the musical director on the Australian TV show, Good News Week, and composed music for ABC-TV including The Afternoon Show, EC Plays Lift Off, Play School and TVTV.

== Biography ==
Mac was born on 17 September 1965. He is the youngest of seven children and grew up in a strict Catholic family in Sydney. As a teenager Mac played hymns on the organ at his local church, including for weddings and funerals. He later described himself as "the worst Virgo, ex-Catholic you've ever met". He is a classically trained graduate from Sydney Conservatorium of Music, as a Bachelor of Music Education. In the mid-1980s he was a member of Smash Mac Mac, which were an art noise band covering Talking Heads material – Mac introduced drum machines and electronic elements. In 1987 they issued the album, Chapter One: Light on the Silo. In 1989 Mac formed the synthpop, electronica group The Lab in Sydney with Yolanda Podolski on lead vocals, and Warwick Hornby (aka Warwick Factor) on vocals and bass guitar. The group signed with rooArt, which released their two extended plays, Ultra (1992) and Terminal (1993). They moved to BMG and issued their debut album, Labyrinth, in 1997. The group disbanded the following year.

=== 1991–1997: Itch-E and Scratch-E ===
In 1991, Mac formed a side-project, Itch-E and Scratch-E, with fellow Sydney-based electronica artist, Andy Rantzen of the group, Pelican Daughters. Both provided keyboards and samplers. Itch-E and Scratch-E became their main focus with the success of their debut album, Itch-E Kitch-E Koo (1993), and its related single, "Sweetness and Light" (1994). At the ARIA Music Awards of 1995 the single won Best Dance Release. During his acceptance speech Mac controversially declared, "We'd like to thank all of Sydney's ecstasy dealers, without whom this award would not be possible". One of the sponsors of the ceremony was the National Drug Offensive, which withdrew their support. In 2005, Mac explained that he did not expect to win and so had not prepared a speech. The group often includes Sherriff Lindo for live performances. From 1996 to 1998, Mac and Rantzen also performed as Boo Boo and Mace!, and with Lindo aboard they worked as Boo Boo Mace 'n' Nutcase.

=== 1997–2000: work with Silverchair, Paul Mac Presents SnapShots and I Can't Believe It's Not Rock ===
In 1997, Mac remixed the single, "Freak", from Australian post-grunge band Silverchair's second album, Freak Show. The track was issued in April as a B-side of their second single from that album, "Abuse Me".

In 1998, Mac released a four-track EP, Paul Mac Presents Snapshots, on Interdance Records. It featured guest vocals by Stephen Allkins on "Ooh I Love Your (Disco)", Infusion on "Loco", Phil Smart on "Basic Boom" and Abel El Toro on "All Systems Are Go". Mac again worked with Silverchair's Daniel Johns as an alternative rock duo to release a five-track extended play, I Can't Believe It's Not Rock (2000).

=== 2001–2005: 3000 Feet High, The Dissociatives and Panic Room ===
On 6 August 2001, Mac issued his debut solo album, 3000 Feet High, which peaked in the top 30 on the ARIA Albums Chart. Australian music journalist, Ed Nimmervoll, felt the album was an "emotional journey" where "[t]hroughout, the dancefloor taunts us like a temptress, determined to lure us into her arms, but we're torn between her charms and the inner us which the dance beats may drown out". The album's second single, "Just the Thing", reached No. 17 on the ARIA Singles Chart and featured lead vocals by Peta Morris. In December 2001 he performed at Homebake on the Big Top stage. At the APRA Music Awards of 2002 "Just the Thing" won 'Most Performed Dance Work' and was nominated for 'Most Performed Australian Work'. In January 2002, and again in 2006, Mac appeared at Splendour in the Grass. At the ARIA Music Awards of 2002 Mac won 'Best Dance Release' for 3000 Feet High and was nominated for 'Best Male Artist' and 'Engineer of the Year'.

Mac and Johns co-wrote the music for Love Is a Four Letter Word (2001) episode 13, "Split". In mid-2003, the Mac and Johns formed another alternative rock group, The Dissociatives, which issued their debut album of the same name in April 2004. Their first live show was in Hobart in June of that year. Mac explained his motivation, "As music narrows out into increasingly smaller genres, it's important to bring the fun of making music back into play. Not following any predetermined rules and making the most honest beautiful music we could is fun". At the ARIA Music Awards of 2004 Mac and Johns were nominated for 'Producer of the Year' for the album.

Mac's second album, Panic Room, appeared on 17 October 2005, and reached the top 40. Johns had advised Mac to "follow your dreams regardless of what outside fashion is saying you should be doing". Vocals are variously supplied by Morris, Sarah McLeod, Luke Steele, Abby Dobson (ex-Leonardo's Bride), Lenka, and Ngaiire. Mac explained seeing Joseph, on TV in August 2004, "I was watching the episode of [Australian Idol] when she got kicked out and I thought 'who is this girl, she is fantastic'... I tracked her down and gave her a call. It turned out great. I am just really happy with the whole album". For Silverchair's 2007 album, Young Modern, Mac supplied piano and toured with the group providing keyboards and piano on stage.

=== 2008–2014: soundtracks, remixes and touring ===
In 2008, Mac provided the music for a one-man comedy play, Possessed, performed by Frank Woodley. In March that year, he supplied the theme song, "The Only One" for the feature film, Hey, Hey, It's Esther Blueburger, with three versions on the soundtrack: one had vocals by Bertie Blackman, another by Sydney Children's Choir and one was an instrumental. He formed a production duo, Stereogamous, with Jonny Seymour (aka DJ Seymour Butz), in 2010 they worked on LCD Soundsystem's single, "I Can Change", from their album, This Is Happening. They have also remixed "Cupid Boy" for Kylie Minogue and "Bring Night" for Sia. In 2011 they worked on George Michael's track, "Every Other Lover in the World". Mac co-wrote "I Don't Care What You Say" with its performer Anthony Callea and Cindy Ryan (of Stella One Eleven); it was released in February 2012 by Callea on his seven-track EP, Last to Go, which was co-produced by Mac. On 6 September, the feature film, Kath & Kimderella, premiered with Mac's musical score. He also has a cameo in the final scene.

=== 2015–present: Holiday From Me and Mesmerism ===
On 22 January 2015, Mac announced the forthcoming release of his third studio album, titled Holiday From Me. It will feature Megan Washington, Brendan Maclean, Dave Mason and Nathan Hudson on vocals.

In February 2019, Mac released a new single titled "Cataplexy" and confirmed a new album is coming soon. In April, Mac confirmed the album is titled Mesmerism and will be released on 3 May 2019. That same year, Mac composed a new score for the silent film The Sentimental Bloke (1919). The score was commissioned by the National Film and Sound Archive and performed live by Mac during screenings of the film.

== Academic career ==
Decades after completing his earlier music degree, Mac returned to his alma mater, Sydney Conservatorium of Music, for postgraduate study. In 2021, he graduated with a Doctor of Musical Arts qualification in composition, based on fusing electronic dance music traditions with experimental practice. As at 2022, he holds an academic staff role at the Conservatorium, teaching Contemporary Music Practice courses within its Bachelor of Music programme.

== Personal life ==
In October 2004, Mac was living in Erskineville. Mac is openly gay; in 2007, he reminisced about his first attendance at Sydney's Mardi Gras in the 1980s: "I can't remember who the act even was – it was a long time ago ... I wasn't really out – actually, I wasn't out at all. I just ended up at the party and I remember realising that there was this whole world out there that I felt really proud to be a part of. There was such a sense of wonder".

== Discography ==
=== Studio albums ===
List of studio albums, with selected chart positions and certifications
Title	Album details	Peak chart positions	Certifications
Title	Album details	AUS	Certifications
3000 Feet High	Released: 6 August 2001; Label: Eleven: A Music Company; Formats: CD	29	ARIA: Gold
Panic Room	Released: 17 October 2005; Label: Eleven: A Music Company; Formats: CD	39	
Holiday From Me	Released: 10 April 2015; Label: Eleven: A Music Company; Formats: CD, digital download	118	
Mesmerism	Released: 3 May 2019; Label: Here to Hell; Formats: Digital download, streaming	—	

=== Extended plays ===
List of extended plays
Title	EP details
Paul Mac Presents Snapshots	Released: 1998; Label: Interdance; Format: CD

=== Singles ===
List of singles, with selected chart positions and certifications
Title	Year	Peak chart positions	Certifications	Album
Title	Year	AUS	Certifications	Album
"Heatseeking Pleasure Machine" (featuring Tex Perkins)	2001	121		3000 Feet High
"Just the Thing" (featuring Peta Morris)	2001	17	ARIA: Gold	3000 Feet High
"The Sound of Breaking Up" (featuring Peta Morris)	2001	25		3000 Feet High
"Gonna Miss You" (featuring Abby Dobson)	2002	62		3000 Feet High
"Stay" (featuring Jacqui Hunt)	2002	79		3000 Feet High
"Sunshine Eyes" (featuring Peta Morris)	2005	27		Panic Room
"Love Declaration" (featuring Aaradhna)	2006	31		Panic Room
"It's Not Me, It's You" (featuring Ngaiire)	2006	— (Note: "It's Not Me, It's You" did not enter the Top 100, but peaked at number 8 on the ARIA Club Tracks.)		Panic Room
"The Only One" (featuring Bertie Blackman)	2008	95		Hey, Hey, It's Esther Blueburger soundtrack
"State of War"	2015	—		Holiday from Me
"The Currawong Shall Return" (with Andy Rantzen)	2018	—		non-album single
"Cataplexy"	2019	—		Mesmerism
"Flamenco"	2019	—		Mesmerism

==== As featured artist ====
Title	Year	Peak chart positions	Certifications	Album
Title	Year	NZ	Certifications	Album
"In the Clear" (Six60 featuring Paul Mac)	2012	12	RMNZ: Gold	Six60
"Forever Young" (2026 flashback remix) (Youth Group featuring Paul Mac)	2026	—		Forever Young (War Child album)

=== Production work and other credits ===
- 1994 "Dead Eyes Opened (Love Experiment)", (remix) Dead Eyes Opened Remix Severed Heads
- 1996 "The Contender", "The Contender (reprise)" (remixes) Rock and Roll The Mark of Cain
- 1999 "Anthem for the Year 2000", "Spawn Again", "Satin Sheets" (keyboards) Neon Ballroom Silverchair
- 2000 I Can't Believe It's Not Rock (with Daniel Johns)
- 2002 "Across the Night", "World Upon Your Shoulders", "Tuna in the Brine", "Too Much of Not Enough", "Luv Your Life", "My Favourite Thing" (piano) Diorama Silverchair
- 2002 "Symphony of Life" (extended euroremix) Tina Arena
- 2004 "Pictures of You" (remix) One Perfect Day after The Cure's 1989 album Disintegration
- 2004 "She" (producer) Stella One Eleven Stella One Eleven
- 2005 (co-producer) Counting Down the Days Natalie Imbruglia
- 2005 "Mini Morris Parts 1 and 2" (performer with Cezary Skubiszewski) Hating Alison Ashley Various Artists
- 2025 "Something Good" (remix) (with The Superjesus)
- 2026 "Forever Young" with Youth Group (PaulMac remix) on Forever Young by War Child Australia

== Awards and nominations ==
=== ARIA Awards ===
PaulMac has won one award from seven ARIA Music Awards nominations.

Year	Nominee / work	Award	Result
2001	"Just the Thing"	Best Dance Release	Nominated
2001	"Just the Thing"	Best Male Artist	Nominated
2001	3000 Feet High	Best Dance Release	Won
2001	3000 Feet High	Best Male Artist	Nominated
2001	3000 Feet High	Engineer of the Year	Nominated
2004	PaulMac with Daniel Johns for The Dissociatives	Producer of the Year	Nominated
2006	Panic Room	Best Dance Release	Nominated

=== APRA Awards ===
The APRA Awards are held in Australia and New Zealand by the Australasian Performing Right Association to recognise songwriting skills, sales and airplay performance by its members annually. PaulMac has won one award from four nominations.

Year	Nominee / work	Award	Result
2002	"Just the Thing"	Most Performed Australian Work	Nominated
2002	"Just the Thing"	Most Performed Dance Work	Won
2002	"The Sound of Breaking Up"	Most Performed Dance Work	Nominated
2006	"Sunshine Eyes"	Most Performed Dance Work	Nominated
