= Split Seconds =

Australian indie pop band

Split Seconds is a five-piece indie pop band from Perth, Australia.

The band formed was formed in 2010 by Sean Pollard, a Perth-based singer songwriter.

Split Seconds' first self-titled EP was released in 2011, and earned the band win 4 WAMI awards in 2011 including Favourite Newcomer, Most Promising New Act, Best Indie Pop Band and Best Male Vocalist. Many of the songs were written by Pollard.

Their single "Bed Down" received high rotation on Triple J after they were unearthed by the station to play the Big Day Out.

In 2012 Split Seconds were nominated for 8 WAMI award, winning Best Male Vocalist for Sean Pollard.

Their debut album You'll Turn Into Me was released on 10 August 2012 and features the singles "All You Gotta Do" and "Top Floor."

In 2013 the band relocated to Melbourne.

In 2014 their EP Neil Young and Dumb was released.

== Discography ==
=== Albums ===
Title	Details
You'll Turn Into Me	Released: August 2012; Label: Inertia Records (QB0001); Format: CD, DD
Rest & Relocation	Released: June 2016; Label: Quelle Barbe; Format: LP, DD

=== Extended plays ===
Title	Details
Split Seconds	Released: 2011; Label: Split Seconds (SS0001); Format: CD, DD
Neil Young and Dumb	Released: September 2014; Label: Split Seconds; Format: CD, DD

== Awards and nominations ==
=== West Australian Music Industry Awards ===
The West Australian Music Industry Awards (WAMIs) are annual awards presented to the local contemporary music industry, put on annually by the Western Australian Music Industry Association Inc (WAM). They won four awards at the 2011 ceremony and have won five overall.

Year	Nominee / work	Award	Result (wins only)
2011	Split Seconds	Favourite Newcomer	Won
2011	Split Seconds	Most Promising New Act	Won
2011	Split Seconds	Best Indi Pop Act	Won
2011	Sean Pollard (Split Seconds)	Best Male Vocalist	Won
2012	Sean Pollard (Split Seconds)	Best Male Vocalist	Won
