= Ben Sterling =

British DJ and electronic music producer

- Also known as: Benjamin Anderson
- Origin: London, England
- Genres: Electronic, tech house, acid house, disco house
- Occupations: DJ, producer
- Years active: 2016–present
- Labels: Planet X, X-Files
- Website: bensterling.komi.io

Ben Sterling is a British DJ and electronic music producer from London. He has been described as "a leader of the UK’s new school" by Mixmag.

== Career ==
In 2019, Sterling made his debut on the label Hot Creations with the release of his EP, The Energy, marking a significant milestone in his career. The EP features three tracks blending acid and tech house elements. Sterling's connection with the label stemmed from his previous release, Anonymous EP, on Josh Butler's label, which attracted attention from Jamie Jones. Sterling, who gained early recognition through his residency at London's Ministry of Sound, has been influenced by disco, modern electro, as well as Chicago house and Detroit techno.

In September 2022, Sterling made his debut on the label Solid Grooves with the EP Uno Dos Tres. He has also worked on labels such as Hot Creations, Diynamic, Crosstown Rebels, OBLONG, and Hottrax. Sterling also owns his own brands, Planet X and X-Files, where he promotes young talents.

In July 2023, Sterling released the single "Eeez". Later in September, he made his debut on Damian Lazarus' Crosstown Rebels with "Don’t Truss," a collaboration with Caitlyn Scarlett. The track was praised for its rolling production and Scarlett's captivating vocals.

In January 2024, Sterling released his EP Step Forward, which was described as "an ode to the late great Nathan Coles". In July, he released the single, "Tribal Badman," on his label Planet X. Mixed and mastered by Harry Romero, the track features a combination of skippy drums, a bassline, and vocal elements. This release marked Sterling's return to Planet X since his 2023 single, "Lost Illusions," following work with labels such as PIAS Electronique, Oblong, and Higher Ground. The year saw Sterling debut at Coachella and present a notable showcase of his Planet X project during Miami Music Week. Later that year, he was nominated for RIOT Noise Breakthrough Artist of 2024 by DJ Awards.

Sterling has also performed at Baum Festival, EDC Las Vegas, Sunwaves Festival, and The Warehouse Project. He has become a mainstay at events like Music On and Solid Grooves and has performed at clubs like Ibiza's DC10 and Amnesia.

Sterling has cited artists like Nathan Coles, Terry Francis, Bushwacka!, Solomun, Frankie Knuckles, and The Martinez Brothers as major influences. He has defined his sound as "electronic acid house."

== Discography ==
=== Singles ===
- "Dance Machine" (2019)
- "Es Nasty" (2021)
- "Rok the House" (2022)
- "Mind Dimension (Ben Sterling Remix)" (2022)
- "All Over My Body" (2023)
- "Lost Illusions" (2023)
- "Eeez" (2023)
- "(Hey You) What's That Sound" (ft. Les Rythmes Digitales) (2024)
- "Speed Up (Ben Sterling Remix)" (2024)
- "Tribal Badman" (2024)

=== EPs ===
- The Energy (2019)
- Durh Brain (2022)
- Uno Dos Tres (2022)
- Don't Truss (2023)
- Hey Mister (2023)
- BBB (2023)
- Step Forward (2024)
