= Ya Kidding =

2017 single by Fisher

Single by Fisher
- Released: 30 June 2017
- Length: 3:58
- Label: Dirtybird Records
- Songwriter: Paul Fisher
- Producer: Fisher

Fisher singles chronology
"Ya Kidding" (2017)	"Stop It" (2017)

"Ya Kidding" is a song by Australian producer Fisher, released in June 2017 as his debut single. The song was certified gold in New Zealand in 2025.

== Background ==
American house producer Claude VonStroke caught the attention of Australian producer Fisher and signed him to Dirtybird Records records. VonStroke and Justin Martin first played the song in their B2B set at Miami in 2017, where, according to Dirtybird, it was the "biggest track of the conference". The song received remixes and released as Fisher's debut single on 30 June 2017.

== Reception ==
Kat Bein from Billboard (magazine) said "It's a hot, simmering build that crashes into a multi-coloured groove that’ll have you wet all over."

== Track listings ==
digital download

1. "Ya Kidding" - 3:58

digital download / 12" Vinyl (Dirtybird – DB155)

1. "Ya Kidding" - 6:10
2. "Ya Kidding" (Sébastien V remix) - 7:08
3. "Ya Kidding" (Solardo remix) - 6:11

== Certifications ==
Certifications for "Ya Kidding"
Region	Certification	Certified units/sales
New Zealand (RMNZ)	Gold	15,000^{‡}
^{‡} Sales+streaming figures based on certification alone.
