= Fisher (musician) =

Australian music producer and DJ (born 1985)

- Born: Paul Nicholas Fisher; 5 November 1985 (age 41); Gold Coast, Queensland, Australia
- Genres: House, tech house
- Occupations: Music producer, DJ
- Years active: 2012–present
- Labels: Dirtybird, Catch & Release
- Member of: Under Construction
- Formerly of: Cut Snake
- Spouse: Chloe Chapman (m. 2020)

Paul Nicholas Fisher (born 5 November 1985), known by the stage name and last name Fisher (stylised in all caps), is an Australian music producer and a disc jockey. He has been nominated for several awards, including ARIA Music Awards, Grammy Awards and ranked the No. 7 on top 100 DJ Mag in 2025.

== Early life and surfing career ==
Fisher was born and raised on the Gold Coast where he attended Palm Beach Currumbin State High School. He pursued a professional surfing career early in his life and competed in the World Surf League Qualifying Series for multiple years before retiring from the sport to start a music career in 2012.

== Music career ==
Fisher was one half of the DJ duo Cut Snake. The group was formed with fellow surfer Leigh "Sedz" Sedley. The duo started DJing together while traveling on the pro surfing circuit.

Fisher later went solo and started releasing house music tracks under the stage name Fisher. In June 2017, Fisher released his debut single "Ya Kidding", followed by the EP Oi Oi in November 2017, which includes the tracks "Stop It" and "Ya Didn't".

In March 2018, Fisher released "Crowd Control". "Crowd Control" came in at number 116 in the Triple J Hottest 100 of 2018.

In July 2018, Fisher released "Losing It" which reached number one on the ARIA Club Tracks Chart and made the top 50 on Billboard's Hot Dance/Electronic Songs, Dance/Mix Show Airplay, and Dance Club Songs, the latter becoming his first number one in the United States. "Losing It" also garnered Fisher his first Grammy nomination for "Best Dance Recording" at the 2019 Grammys. "Losing It" came in at number 2 in the Triple J Hottest 100 of 2018.

On 10 May 2019, Fisher released "You Little Beauty", which became his second number one on the Dance Club Songs chart. "You Little Beauty" came in at number 53 in the Triple J Hottest 100 of 2019.

On 20 March 2020, Fisher released "Freaks", the lead single from his extended play of the same name. The EP was released on 31 March, alongside the second single “Wanna Go Dancin’”.

On 8 July 2022, Fisher released World, Hold On (Fisher rework), a remix of the 2006 song by Bob Sinclar featuring Steve Edwards. This was Fisher's first remix release.

In 2023, Fisher released singles "Take It Off", and "Atmosphere".

In 2024, alongside Chris Lake and Sante Sansone, Fisher released a remix of "Somebody That I Used to Know", titled Somebody (2024). He also released singles "Boost Up" and "Ocean", which are collaborations with Flowdan and AR/CO respectively.

== Discography ==
=== Extended plays ===
Title	Details
Oi Oi	Released: 10 November 2017; Label: Dirty Bird; Format: Digital download, streaming
Freaks	Released: 31 March 2020; Label: Catch & Release; Format: Digital download, streaming

=== Singles ===
List of singles, with year released, peak chart positions, certifications, and album name shown
Title	Year	Peak chart positions										Certifications	Album
Title	Year	AUS	BEL (FL)	IRE	LAT Air. (Note: Both Latvian Music Producers Association and TopHit provides airplay charts for Latvia. Since 2023, LaIPA airplay chart has only 20 positions, for this reason the peaks below Top 20 are taken from TopHit Latvian airplay chart.)	NZ Hot	NIC Ang. Air.	UK	US Dance/ Elec.	US Dance Club	VEN Ang. Air.	Certifications	Album
"Ya Kidding"	2017	—	—	—	—	—	*	—	—	—	—	RMNZ: Gold	Non-album single
"Stop It"	2017	—	—	—	—	—	*	—	—	—	—	RMNZ: Gold	Oi Oi
"Crowd Control"	2018	—	—	—	—	—	—	—	—	—	—		Non-album singles
"Losing It"	2018	35	26	60	—	17	—	60	22	1	—	ARIA: 4× Platinum; BPI: Platinum; RMNZ: 2× Platinum	Non-album singles
"You Little Beauty"	2019	41	51	50	—	6	—	78	19	1	—	BPI: Silver; RMNZ: Platinum	Non-album singles
"Freaks"	2020	—	—	—	—	12	—	—	22	—	—		Freaks
"Wanna Go Dancin'"	2020	—	—	—	—	25	—	—	41	—	—		Freaks
"Just Feels Tight"	2021	—	—	—	—	10	—	—	20	—	—		Non-album singles
"Palm Beach Banga"	2022	—	—	—	—	20	—	—	—	—	—		Non-album singles
"It's a Killa" (featuring Shermanology)	2022	—	—	—	—	12	—	—	37	—	—		Non-album singles
"Yeah the Girls" (featuring Meryll)	2022	—	—	—	—	11	—	—	46	—	—		Non-album singles
"Take It Off" (with Aatig)	2023	—	—	—	—	14	—	—	17	—	—	RMNZ: Gold	Non-album singles
"Atmosphere" (with Kita Alexander)	2023	68	—	—	—	10	—	—	9	—	—	ARIA: 2× Platinum; RMNZ: Platinum	Non-album singles
"Boost Up" (with Flowdan)	2024	—	—	—	—	8	—	—	—	—	—		Non-album singles
"Ocean" (with AR/CO)	2024	—	—	—	—	—	—	—	—	43	—		Non-album singles
"Stay"	2025	— (Note: "Stay" did not enter the Australian top 100 Singles Chart, but peaked at number 9 on Australian Artist Chart.)	—	—	—	7	—	—	—	—	—	RMNZ: Gold	Non-album singles
"Blackberries" (with Bbyclose)	2025	— (Note: "Blackberries" did not enter the Australian top 100 Singles Chart, but peaked at number 8 on Australian Artist Chart.)	—	—	14	15	—	—	—	—	—		Non-album singles
"Rain"	2026	— (Note: "Rain" did not enter the Australian top 100 Singles Chart, but peaked at number 5 on Australian Artist Chart.)	—	—	—	7	—	—	20	—	—		Non-album singles
"Favour" (with Tones and I)	2026	— (Note: "Favour" did not enter the Australian top 100 Singles Chart, but peaked at number 4 on Australian Artist Chart.)	—	—	13	3	5	100	14	—	7		Non-album singles
"What a Life" featuring Florence Arman)	2026	—	—	—	97	7	—	—	—	—	—		Non-album singles
"Staring at the Sun" (with Laurel)	2026	— (Note: "Staring at the Sun" did not enter the Australian top 100 Singles Chart, but peaked at number 8 on Australian Artist Chart.)	—	—	1	17	—	—	—	—	—		Non-album singles
"—" denotes a recording that did not chart or was not released. "*" denotes that the chart did not exist at that time.

=== Remixes ===
List of notable "Fisher remixes" singles, with year released and certifications
Title	Year	Peak chart positions					Certifications
Title	Year	GRE Int.	HND Ang. Air.	LTU Air.	NZ Hot	ROU Air.	Certifications
"World, Hold On (Fisher rework)" (with Bob Sinclar featuring Steve Edwards)	2022	17	—	—	—	—	ARIA: Platinum; BPI: Gold
"Jamming (Fisher rework)" (with Bob Marley and the Wailers)	2024	—	7	—	—	—	
"Somebody (2024)" (with Gotye, Kimbra, Chris Lake and Sansone)	2024	82	—	25	—	74	ARIA: Platinum; BRMA: Gold; RMNZ: Platinum
"Waiting for Tonight" (with Jennifer Lopez)	2024	—	—	—	35	—	
"—" denotes a recording that did not chart or was not released.

== Awards and nominations ==
=== AIR Awards ===
The Australian Independent Record Awards (commonly known informally as AIR Awards) is an annual awards night to recognise, promote and celebrate the success of Australia's Independent Music sector.

Year	Nominee / work	Award	Result	Ref.
2019	"Losing It"	Best Independent Dance, Electronica Or Club Single	Nominated	
2024	"Atmosphere" (with Kita Alexander)	Best Independent Dance, Electronica or Club Single	Won	
2026	"Stay"	Best Independent Dance / Club Single	Nominated	

=== APRA Music Awards ===
The APRA Music Awards were established by Australasian Performing Right Association (APRA) in 1982 to honour the achievements of songwriters and music composers, and to recognise their song writing skills, sales and airplay performance, by its members annually.

Year	Nominee / work	Award	Result	Ref.
2025	"Atmosphere" with Kita Alexander	Most Performed Dance/Electronic Work	Nominated	

=== ARIA Music Awards ===
The ARIA Music Awards is an annual awards ceremony that recognises excellence, innovation, and achievement across all genres of Australian music.

Year	Nominee / work	Award	Result	Ref.
2018	"Losing It"	Best Dance Release	Nominated	
2019	"You Little Beauty"	Best Dance Release	Nominated	
2023	"Take It Off" (with Aatig)	Best Dance/Electronic Release	Nominated	
2024	"Atmosphere" with Kita Alexander	Best Dance/Electronic Release	Nominated	
2024	"Atmosphere" with Kita Alexander	Song of the Year	Nominated	
2024	Fisher for "Atmosphere" by Fisher and Kita Alexander	Best Produced Release	Nominated	
2025	"Stay"	Best Dance/Electronic Release	Nominated	
2025	"Stay"	Song of the Year	Nominated	
2025	"Somebody (2024)" (Gotye, Fisher and Chris Lake featuring Kimbra and Sante Sansone)	Song of the Year	Nominated	
2026	"Blackberries"	Song of the Year	Nominated	

=== DJ Magazine's top 100 DJs ===
The top 100 DJs is a public poll of the world's 100 most popular DJ by the magazine.

Year	Position	Notes	Ref.
2019	63	New Entry	
2020	76	Down 13	
2021	77	Down 1	
2022	48	Up 29	
2023	20	Up 28	
2024	8	Up 12	
2025	7	Up 1	

=== Electronic Dance Music Awards ===
The Electronic Dance Music Awards are presented by iHeart Radio and commenced in 2016 (Known as Radio Remix Awards from 2016-2019 and had a two year break from 2020-2022).

Year	Nominee / work	Award	Result	Ref.
2019	"I'm Losing Sexyback" (SJUR remix) (with Justin Timberlake)	Best Mashup	Nominated	
2019	"Losing It"	Dance Song of the Year (Non Remix)	Nominated	
2022	"It's a Killer" (with Shermanology)	Dance Song of the Year	Nominated	
2022	"It's a Killer" (with Shermanology)	Tech House Song of the Year	Won	
2023	"World Hold On" by Bob Sinclar (Fisher remix)	Remix Rewind	Nominated	
2024	Fisher	Producer of the Year	Nominated	
2024	Fisher	Tech House Artist of the Year	Won	
2024	"Take It Off" (with Aatig)	House Song of the Year	Nominated	
2024	"Take It Off" (with Aatig)	Tech House Song of the Year	Won	
2024	"Take It Off" (with Aatig)	Music Video of the Year	Nominated	
2024	"Take It Off" (with Aatig)	Dance Song of the Year	Nominated	
2024	"Atmosphere" (With Kita Alexander)	Dance Song of the Year	Nominated	
2025	Fisher	Producer of the Year	Nominated	
2025	Fisher	Tech House Artist of the Year	Nominated	
2025	"Boost Up" (with Flowdan)	Tech House Song of the Year	Won	
2025	"It's That Time" by Marlon Hoffstadt (Fisher Remix)	Remixer of the Year	Nominated	
2025	"Somebody"	Remake of the Year	Nominated	
2025	"Jamming" (Bob Marley & The Wailers) (Fisher Remix)	Remix Rewind	Nominated	
2026	Fisher	Tech House Artist of the Year	Nominated	
2026	Fisher B2B Chris Lake	Favourite B2B	Nominated	

=== International Dance Music Awards ===
The International Dance Music Awards is an annual awards ceremony held in Miami Beach, Florida, United States as a major part of the Winter Music Conference. The awards commenced ran from 1985 to 2020.

Year	Category	Work	Outcome	Ref.
2019	Breakthrough Artist of the year 2019	—N/a	Nominated	
2019	Best Electronic Song	"Losing It"	Won	
2020	Best House Artist (Male)	—N/a	Won	
2020	Best Electronic Song	"You Little Beauty"	Won	

=== Grammy Awards ===
The Grammy Award is an award presented by the Recording Academy to recognize achievement in the music industry. The awards commenced in 1959.

Year	Category	Work	Outcome	Ref.
2019	Best Dance Recording	"Losing It"	Nominated	

=== Queensland Music Awards ===
The Queensland Music Awards (previously known as Q Song Awards) are annual awards celebrating Queensland, Australia's brightest emerging artists and established legends. They commenced in 2006.

Year	Nominee / work	Award	Result (wins only)	Ref.
2024	"Atmosphere" with Kita Alexander	Highest Selling Single	Won	
2026	"Stay"	Highest Selling Single	Won	

=== Rolling Stone Australia Awards ===
The Rolling Stone Australia Awards are awarded annually by the Australian edition of Rolling Stone magazine for outstanding contributions to popular culture in the previous year.

Year	Nominee / work	Award	Result	Ref.
2024	"Atmosphere" with Kita Alexander	Best Single	Nominated	
2024	Fisher	Rolling Stone Global Award	Nominated	
