= You Little Beauty =

Single by Fisher
- Released: 10 May 2019
- Genre: Tech house; EDM; trance
- Length: 3:26
- Label: Catch & Release; Etcetc
- Songwriters: Paul Fisher; Thomas Earnshaw; Dan Hartman
- Producer: Fisher

Fisher singles chronology
"Losing It" (2018)	"You Little Beauty" (2019)	"Freaks" (2020)

"You Little Beauty" is a song by Australian producer Fisher, released as a single on 10 May 2019 through Catch & Release and Etcetc. The song samples the vocals of late disco and house legend Loleatta Holloway's song "Love Sensation". It became Fisher's second consecutive number one on the ARIA Club Tracks chart.

At the ARIA Music Awards of 2019, the song was nominated for Best Dance Release.

== Background ==
Upon release Fisher told Zane Lowe on Beats 1: "The vocal itself is so amazing. All I wanted to do was just put my Fisher charm to it really, and I just wanted to make a big old bassline, put some hats and a good old kick, and away we went." Fisher added: "'You Little Beauty' is basically what we always say on Gold Coast is when everyone's going mad, or having fun, or doing something goofy - you just say 'you little beauty'. I basically just made that song and I thought, what can I call it? and I thought, 'You Little Beauty.'"

== Charts ==
=== Weekly charts ===
Chart (2019)	Peak position
Australia (ARIA)	41
Belgium (Ultratip Bubbling Under Flanders)	1
Belgium (Ultratip Bubbling Under Wallonia)	39
Ireland (IRMA)	50
Scotland Singles (OCC)	40
UK Singles (OCC)	78
US Dance Club Songs (Billboard)	1
US Hot Dance/Electronic Songs (Billboard)	19

=== Year-end charts ===
Chart (2019)	Position
US Dance Club Songs (Billboard)	5
US Hot Dance/Electronic Songs (Billboard)	69

== Certifications ==
Certifications for "You Little Beauty"
Region	Certification	Certified units/sales
Brazil (Pro-Música Brasil)	Gold	20,000^{‡}
New Zealand (RMNZ)	Platinum	30,000^{‡}
Spain (Promusicae)	Gold	30,000^{‡}
United Kingdom (BPI)	Silver	200,000^{‡}
^{‡} Sales+streaming figures based on certification alone.

== See also ==
- List of Billboard number-one dance songs of 2019
