= DKLM =

DKLM may refer to:

- Royal Life Guards Music Band (Denmark) (Den Kongelige Livgarde Musikkorps), the foremost military band in the Danish Defence and the official regimental band of the Danish Royal Life Guards
- Don't Kill Live Music Australia, a campaign against the New South Wales state government
