= Atmosphere (Fisher song) =

Single by Fisher and Kita Alexander
- Released: 11 August 2023
- Genre: Tech house
- Length: 3:02
- Label: Catch & Release
- Songwriters: Kita Alexander; Thomas Earnshaw; Dominik Felsmann; Paul Fisher; Konstantin Kersting
- Producer: Fisher

Fisher singles chronology
"Take It Off" (2023)	"Atmosphere" (2023)	"Boost Up" (2024)

Kita Alexander singles chronology
"Date Night" (2023)	"Atmosphere" (2023)	"Best You Ever Had" (2023)

Music video
- "Atmosphere" (lyric video) on YouTube

"Atmosphere" is a song by Australian producer Fisher and Australian singer Kita Alexander released as a single on 11 August 2023 through Catch & Release.

The song was nominated for Best Single at the Rolling Stone Australia Awards.

The song won the Highest Selling Single at the 2024 Queensland Music Awards.

At the AIR Awards of 2024, the song won Best Independent Dance, Electronica or Club Single. At the APRA Music Awards of 2025, the song was nominated for Most Performed Dance/Electronic Work.

== Reception ==
Owen George from Gold Coast Magazine wrote, "Seamlessly fusing Fisher's signature beats with Kita's otherworld vocals, 'Atmosphere' guides listeners on a euphoric journey through space, before dropping into a deep and dark finish. The track is a perfect example of Fisher's ability to create dance music that is both catchy and complex, and Kita's vocals add a new dimension to the track that makes it truly special."

Steve Likoski from Ear Milk felt that "'Atmosphere' is not only a song that encapsulates the positive, uplifting energy between the respective Australian artists, but it also signifies a harmonious togetherness of distinct styles across the entire three-minutes and two second runtime."

We Rave You said "This feel-good party track is primed to set dance floors ablaze."

== Charts ==
=== Weekly charts ===
Weekly chart performance for "Atmosphere"
Chart (2023–2024)	Peak position
Australia (ARIA)	68
Hungary (Dance Top 40)	20
New Zealand Hot Singles (RMNZ)	10

=== Year-end charts ===
2024 year-end chart performance for "Atmosphere"
Chart (2024)	Position
Australian Artist (ARIA)	35
Hungary (Dance Top 40)	80

== Certifications ==
Certifications for "Atmosphere"
Region	Certification	Certified units/sales
Australia (ARIA)	2× Platinum	140,000^{‡}
New Zealand (RMNZ)	Platinum	30,000^{‡}
^{‡} Sales+streaming figures based on certification alone.
