= Dirtybird Records =

- Parent company: Empire Distribution
- Founded: 2005
- Founder: Claude VonStroke
- Genre: House, tech house, electronic music
- Country of origin: U.S.
- Location: San Francisco, California
- Official website: www.dirtybirdrecords.com

Dirtybird Records is an independent electronic music record label based in San Francisco, California. The label was founded in January 2005 by Claude VonStroke (aka Barclay Crenshaw) and specializes in a brand of house music he describes as "tech funk." Dirtybird caters to dance music fans who are seeking something a little more laid back on the dance floor. The catalog is party music. Dirtybird won Underground Label of the Year at the International Dance Music Awards during Winter Music Conference in 2013 (presented in 2014) and 2014 (presented in 2015).

== History ==
Claude VonStroke got the idea to create a label in 2002 during the production of Intellect, an intensive study and documentary on DJs and producers in house music and techno. He created the concept of the label to supply tracks for the DVD's soundtrack. Through the Intellect project, VonStroke met Christian Martin, who later introduced him to his younger brother Justin Martin. Justin would go on to contribute music to the soundtrack.

The first artists to release music on Dirtybird were Claude VonStroke, Justin Martin, and Sammy D. In an interview, VonStroke details the beginnings of starting the label, "I did everything humanly possible. Based on what I'd learned making the documentary, I was able to skip a lot of pitfalls and save a lot of money. I worked directly with distributors and did a lot of the legwork. I even shipped bundles to something like 100 DJs with handwritten notes." VonStroke also credits his wife as being the one who helped execute the idea of the label both financially and tactically by giving him a one-year trial with a deadline to pull it off.

The bird logo was derived from a drawing VonStroke used to make when he was a kid to make his little brother laugh but was changed to the lightning bolt cracked egg design in 2015. In 2013, VonStroke began picking a lowbrow surrealist every year to be an "artist in residence" to create release artwork for the label. Notable artists in residence have included Graham Carter, Raoul Deleo, and Dan May. The same year, opened offices in Los Angeles to expand the label's roster.

The first release on Dirtybird was The Southern Draw EP by Justin Martin and Sammy D. The label celebrated its 10th anniversary in 2015 with a compilation album and the first annual Dirtybird Campout festival in California later that same year. In 2013, VonStroke opened offices in Los Angeles to help expand the label's roster. Claude VonStroke picks all the music and is well known for breaking new artists and frequently signs music by unknown producers. The current label manager is Deron Delgado.

On October 20, 2022, Dirtybird was acquired by EMPIRE. Per the terms of the deal, EMPIRE now owns the entirety of the Dirtybird brand, including Dirtybird's back catalog and all future releases, minus Dirtybird's live events. Moody Jones serves as the president.

== Notable artists ==
- Claude VonStroke
- Justin Martin
- FISHER
- Hannah Wants
- Julio Bashmore
- Kyle Watson
- Little by Little
- Marc Houle
- Miguel Manzano
- Milosh
- Nick Monaco
- Secondcity
- Shadow Child
- Style of Eye

== Albums ==
- Beware of the Bird - Claude VonStroke (August 5, 2006)
- Stars of Zoo - Catz n’ Dogz (November 11, 2008)
- Bird Brain - Claude VonStroke (October 21, 2009)
- Escape From the Zoo - Catz n' Dogz (February 15, 2012)
- Ghettos & Gardens - Justin Martin (May 22, 2012)
- Urban Animal - Claude VonStroke (September 24, 2013)
- Taylr Swift - Kill Frenzy (November 3, 2014)
- Hello Clouds - Justin Martin (April 20, 2016)
- Self Help - Walker & Royce (October 20, 2017)
- Live in Detroit - Claude VonStroke (June 22, 2018)
- Mr. Good - Ardalan (November 1, 2019)

== Compilations ==
- Best of Mothership - Various Artists (March 3, 2007)
- Five Years of Dirtybird - Various Artists (March 31, 2010)
- BASS - Various Artists (January 12, 2011)
- Makeovers - Various Artists (July 27, 2011)
- Dirtybird HATCHED - Various Artists (January 10, 2012)
- DIRTYBIRD Players - Various Artists (February 27, 2013)
- dirtybird BBQ - Various Artists (February 25, 2014)
- The 7 Days of Dirtybird - Various Artists (December 16, 2014)
- Dirtybird 10 - Various Artists (January 27, 2015)
- If You Find Yourself In A Large Room, Vol. - Various Artists (June 15, 2015)
- DIRTYBIRD BBQ: Grill$on's Revenge - Various Artists (July 25, 2015)
- The New Years Special - Various Artists (December 28, 2015)
- Dirtybird BBQ: Secret Sauce - Various Artists (June 14, 2016)
- Dirtybird Campout Compilation - Various Artists (September 30, 2016)
- "The New Years Special, Vol. 2" - Various Artists (December 23, 2016)
- "Dirtybird BBQ: Secret Ingredients" - Various Artists (May 19, 2017)
- ”Dirtybird BBQ: Filthy Flavor” - Various Artists (May 18, 2018)
