= Don't Kill Live Music Australia =

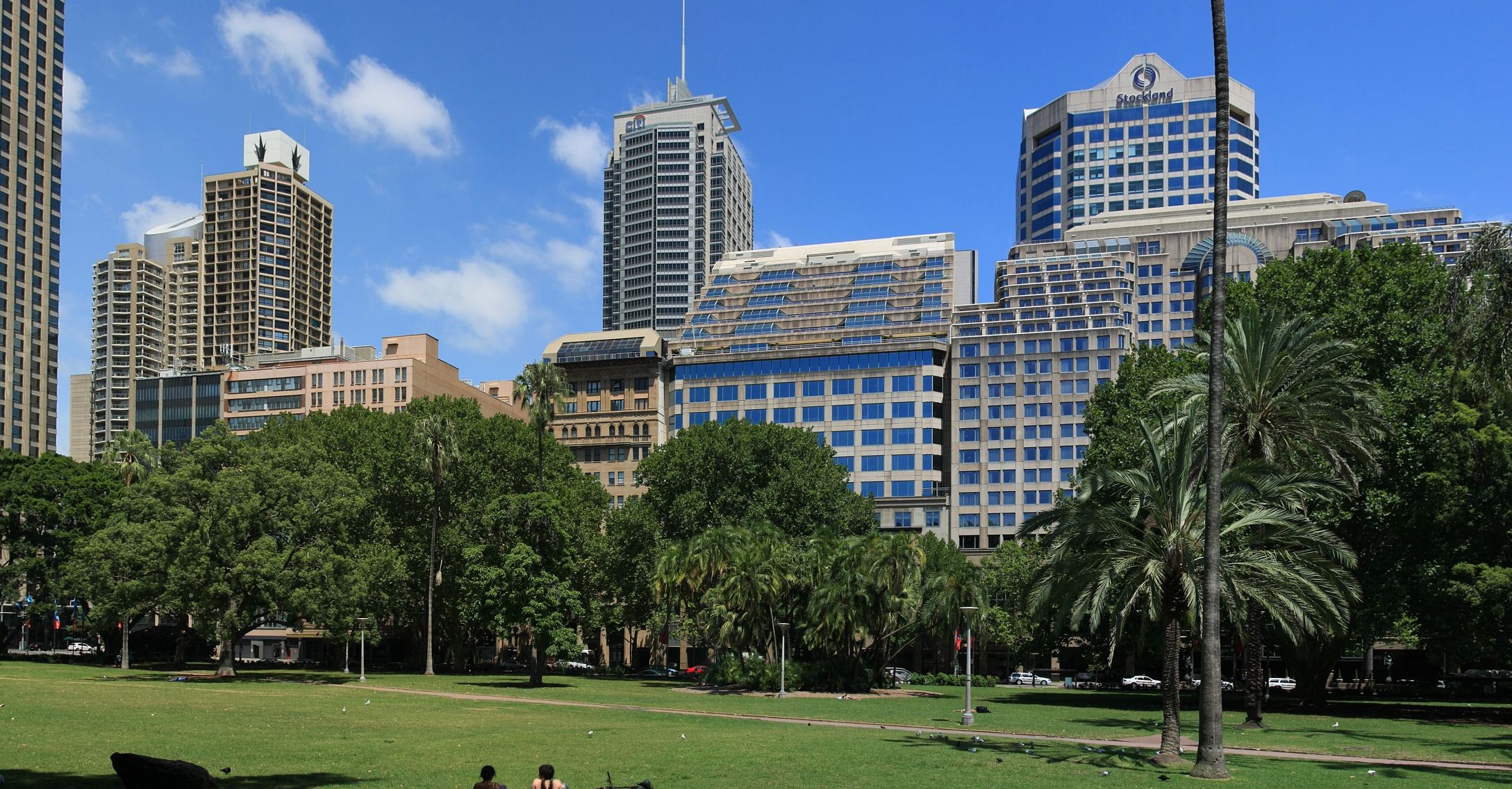
The Don't Kill Live Music Australia Rally took place at Hyde Park, Sydney.

Don't Kill Live Music Australia was a campaign against the New South Wales (NSW) State Government, demanding changes to regulations that directly impact music festivals within the state. The campaign saw the establishment of an official petition with over 110,000 signatures as well as an organised rally with an estimated 30,000 protestors which was held on 21 February 2019, at Sydney, Australia’s Hyde Park.

Concern was caused by sudden regulation and policy changes that could negatively affect festival organisers and the future of some music festivals. The state government and New South Wales Premier, Gladys Berejiklian, deemed regulations surrounding festivals and drug dealers at the 'high risk' events inadequate. This resulted in the implementation of tougher licensing policies for music festivals. The Don't Kill Live Music campaign was then initiated to ensure that the regulatory changes would not negatively impact the future of music festival and instead suggest the formation of a review board for any regulations that deal with festivals.

The political tension created by the campaign was leading up to the 2019 NSW State Elections in which several Don't Kill Live Music supporters wanted to elect a new parliament that would support the re-regulation of music festivals and increased transparency as suggested by the petition demands. However, the election day, 23 March 2019, saw Gladys Berejiklian elected as New South Wales' third female elected Premier which lead to the inactivity of the Don't Kill Live Music Australia campaign.

== Context ==
Due to a number of deaths at festivals taking place in the state over the course of 2018 and 2019, the NSW Government had changed their focus towards festival related policies with hopes to reduce drug related casualties. The five deaths that initiated the urgency of regulation change were young adults between the age of 19 and 23. 19-year-old Alex Ross-King was the fifth death drug-related death taking place in New South Wales. Other deaths included Diana Nguyen, 21, Joseph Pham, 23, Callum Bosnan, 19, and Josh Tam, 22. These deaths occurred at FOMO festival, Defqon.1, Knockout Games of Destiny and Lost Paradise, all four of which are now included on the list of 'high-risk' events. Several festival organisers such as Psyfari and Mountain Sounds (festival) (who have both since cancelled their festivals in 2019) have expressed their concerns with regards to excessive costs which include NSW Police bills that quote approximately 200,000AUD for their mandatory services. The new policies have been criticised by several festival attenders and as a result of that, the Don't Kill Live Music campaign was launched.

The campaign intensified with the media attention the petition was receiving, as well as social media support from several Australian artists such as Amy Shark, RÜFÜS DU SOL, and Vance Joy. The social media outrage was heavily targeted towards the NSW Premier, Gladys Berejiklian, who played an extensive role in transforming the festival regulations. Berejiklian insists that the motive behind the new policies were measures to make festivals safer and more enjoyable. Berejiklian's concern with regards to the safety of these festivals are supported by the concerning NSW Health data. Reports suggest that over 66 young festival-goers required extensive emergency medical care over the summer of 2018–19 in New South Wales. The rally was held regardless of Berejiklian's statements, and was considered a success with nearly 30,000 protestors and performing acts such as electronic music duo, Peking Duck.

According to a study by Deloitte, Sydney's economy could be generating AU$16 billion more per annum if it was not for the underdeveloped night life. The research suggests that despite the 230,000 jobs and AU$27 billion per annum that the industry has already generated, there is a lot of are for growth. However, laws and regulations surrounding night-life and live music are hindering any chance of growing the industry. Economic partner at Deloitte, Kathryn Matthews, believes that an attractive arts sector, rich in culture, would attract and retain talent within Sydney.

== Petition ==
Prior to the rally, the campaign received mass media attention from a petition started on Change.org, signed by tens of thousands of supporters across Australia, including Australian public figures such as Amy Shark and Daryl Braithwaite. What many individuals saw as the government's "war on music and culture" in New South Wales, had a contender in the petition. The petition gained over 100,000 signatures leading to direct talks between major representatives from the festival industry within the New South Wales where concerns were shared regarding new regulations and policies surrounding the industry.

The petition holds a strong stance against the government's actions with regards to their newly imposed regulations as well as established drug and alcohol policies:

"Music is being killed off by Premier Berejiklian and the LNP. Festivals are being forced to cancel or move interstate,"

"Instead of consulting with festival experts, the NSW Government imposed punitive regulation that specifically targets music festivals and music fans. Festivals are being used as a scapegoat for years of failed drug and alcohol policy."

The petition received a response from the former Labor leader, Michael Daley, claiming that if the Labor party were to win the elections, up to AUD$35million would be funded for contemporary music. However, soon after the statement, the election was won by the Berejiklian government.

== Rally ==
The main intentions of the rally was to delay the new policies and regulations that were set to be established on 1 March 2019, till after the New South Wales state elections on 23 March 2019. The campaign organisers were concerned that the regulatory body did not have an ideal understanding about music festival operations in order to efficiently regulate it. The rally's message was to delay implementation of the new policies until the ideal entities could cooperate with the regulatory body and make educated recommendations.

Before the Rally took place, the government issued a statement suggesting that there was a confusion with the interim guidelines, and are instead open to discussion with the industry, regarding the balance of safety and entertainment within festivals.

=== List of performing acts ===
- Ocean Alley
- The Rubens
- Dan Sultan
- Polish Club
- Olympia
- Cloud Control
- Urthboy and Bertie Blackman

=== List of speakers ===
- Rhys Muldoon
- Julien Hamilton
- Murray Cook
- Adelle Robinson
- Councillor Jess Sculy
- Gordon Bradbury
- Michael Chugg
- Dave Faulkner
- Jane Slingo
- Yumi Stynes
- Helen Marcou
- Tim Levinson

Despite the overwhelming support that the rally received, several other policies were not addressed when they could have. Writer Nayuka Gorrie suggests that the protests may give New South Wales citizens a similar experience to what they have already have been receiving when instead, they could focus on increasing accessibility for disabled festival attendees, as well as racism influenced over-policing and similar security related discrimination. Gorrie believes that the rally was a missed opportunity to focus on the important aspects of NSW's nightlife; however, the aspect of reduced festival costs took priority. Council member Peggy Dwyer mentioned a few more issues related to these music events that should be prioritised, such as the availability of water, shade, rest areas and adequate medical services at the venues.

A spokesperson for Keep Sydney Open, Tyson Koh, has criticised the negativity at the rally. Koh was concerned about certain offensive banners that compared Berejiklian to a witch, which he saw as "part of the problem". Koh believes that the attack on Berejiklian's appearance is part of the problem and that there are more civil ways of showing protest and criticism towards the government.

Don't Kill Live Music Australia responded to the backlash by releasing this statement:

Protesting in Australia is a constitutional right. As Don't Kill Live Music, we don't have control over individual expression of anger towards the NSW government. In mass protest there are those [who] push the boundaries of acceptable expression. At no time does DKLM condone sexism, racism or denigration of individuals.

== Policies and politics ==
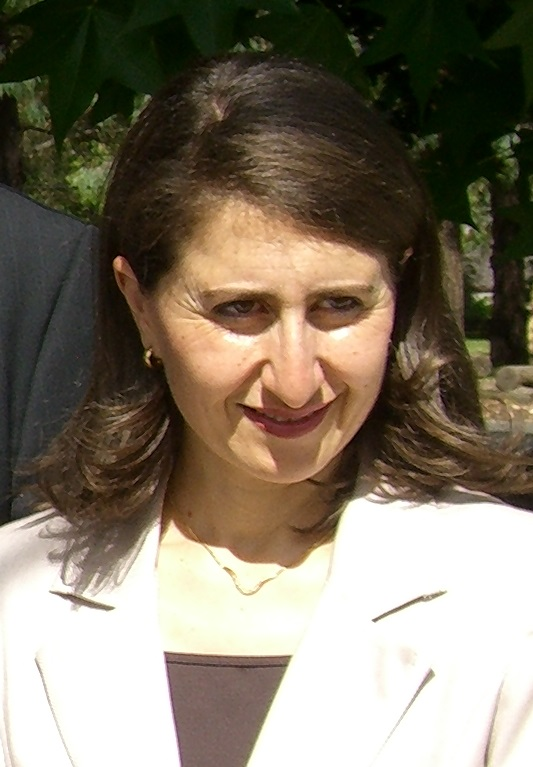
45th Premier of the New South Wales, Gladys Berejiklian

Media coverage was heavily focussed on the pill-testing debate during the few months leading up to New South Wales' 2019 state election. The controversial topic took to new heights due to the several drug-related deaths at festivals in the state. The Government's response to the tragic incidents were prioritising the safety of festival attendees. New licensing schemes that could negatively affect festivals were introduced despite the government being aware of the importance of the live music culture that New South Wales thrives on.

Gladys Berejiklian's press release regarding the reasoning behind NSW Health being a major part of the new regulations:

“Currently, there is no regulatory requirement for event organisers to work with NSW Health. “However, NSW Health has directly approached organisers planning to hold events on land managed by the Office of Environment and Heritage. NSW Health encourages these event-organisers to deliver harm reduction messages to attendees.”

The press release states nothing about future plans for pill-testing facilities, however, it addresses that the Government are taking the most effective approach to dealing with the safety of festival-goers. Berejiklian ensures that she is aware of the importance of music festivals and its positive role in the entertainment industry, however, she claims to owe it to young individuals and their families to keep them safe. Berejiklian suggests that the introduction of the new licenses will focus on high risk events.

=== List of 'high-risk' events in Australia ===
- Defqon.1
- Transmission
- Subsonic
- Knockout Games of Destiny
- Lost Paradise
- This That
- FOMO
- HTID
- Electric Gardens
- Rolling Loud
- Ultra Music Festival
- Laneway

With the Berejiklian government at the centre of all the attention, the political side of the campaign was evident. Due to the deaths that were drug-related at music festivals, Premier Berejiklian made major policy changes that would cost festival organisers more money to operate. Drug reform advocates requested for the implementation of pill-testing instead, however, the government's decision was to employ an increased amount of police and emergency services, costing festivals up to AUS$200,000. This eventually led to the Don't Kill Live Music Australia rally, as well as, the formation of the Australian Festival Alliance (consisting of several even promoters), which aims to delay the regulations. The alliance has also proceeded to take legal action against the State Government of New South Wales.

With the elections a month away from the rally, the Labor Party announced their music policy which includes a AUD$35million budget over the course of four years with intentions to maintain and grow the music industry.
