= Matthew Benjamin =

Matthew Benjamin may refer to:

- Matthew Benjamin (squash player), former professional squash player from Wales
- Matthew Benjamin, DJ and part of Layo & Bushwacka!
