= Miami Music Week =

Weeklong marathon of electronic dance music in Miami, Florida

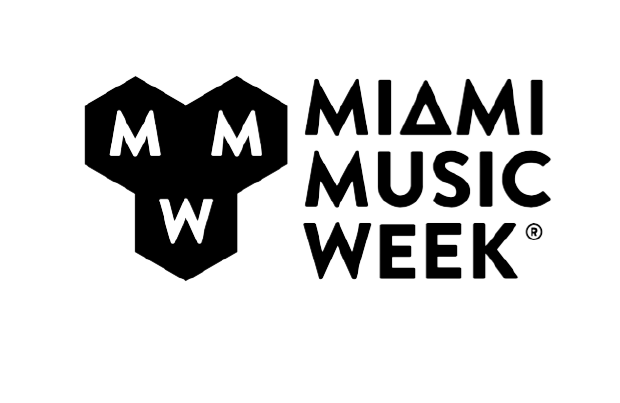
- Status: Active
- Genre: Electronic music event
- Date: March
- Frequency: Annually
- Locations: Miami, Florida, United States
- Country: United States
- Years active: 2011–present
- Website: miamimusicweek.com

Miami Music Week (MMW) is a weeklong marathon of electronic dance music that takes place in Miami, Florida, during the last week of March. The event is attended by hundreds of thousands of people from all over the world. In 2015, over 1,000 artists performed at over 260 events hosted at a myriad of venues across Miami. Venues include nightclubs, pools, boats, and pop-up spaces/venues in areas such as Wynwood, Downtown Miami, Miami Beach, and Little Haiti. Miami Music Week also leads up to the Ultra Music Festival, which is attended by 165,000 people over three days.

== History ==
Miami Music Week began in 2011, taking place from 24–27 March, ending at the same time Ultra Music Festival had concluded its thirteenth edition. Since then, Miami Music Week has continued to grow every year, eventually becoming one of the world's largest congregations of dance music lovers.

On March 21, 2018, Miami Music Week bought out the Winter Music Conference and the International Dance Music Awards.

== Artists and venues ==
There have been many other hotels that have hosted pool parties during previous editions of Miami Music Week. These include the Gale Hotel, Dream Hotel, Raleigh Hotel, SLS Hotel, Surfcomber Hotel, Nautilus South Beach, Congress Hotel, Albion Hotel, and many others located around Miami Beach.

Miami Music Week has gained popularity through notable reunions, debuts, and traditions. This includes the return of Deep Dish (Sharam & Dubfire); and the debut of ENTER. in Miami; the massive 24-hour marathon party, Get Lost which is hosted by Crosstown Rebels; and of course Ultra Music Festival, which consistently proves to be one of the most popular music festivals in the world.

Labels like Crosstown Rebels, Music On, Armada, Spinnin', Revealed, Monstercat, Anjunabeats, Mixmash, Dirtybird, Fool's Gold, Mad Decent, Axtone, and mau5trap hosted events during this past edition of Miami Music Week across venues throughout the city of Miami. Artists who have appeared at Miami Music Week in the past include the likes of Armin van Buuren, Hardwell, Afrojack, Axwell, Steve Angello, Above & Beyond, Eric Prydz, Luciano, Markus Schulz, Damian Lazarus, Marco Carola, Sander van Doorn, Martin Garrix, Laidback Luke, Tiesto, David Guetta, Kaskade, Skrillex, Cashmere Cat, Chet Faker, Richie Hawtin, Josh Wink, Solomun, and many more.

=== Miami Music Week Hotel (2015–present) ===
In 2015, Miami Music Week announced the first-ever Miami Music Week Hotel, which was located at the Delano Hotel in South Beach, Florida. In 2016, the Miami Music Week Hotel once again took place at the Delano Hotel. The MMW Hotel has served as the epicenter of parties during Miami Music Week. The hotel has hosted official events at both the Delano Beach Club and the FDR Lounge & Nightclub during the past two years. Artists like The Magician, Robin Schulz, Klingande, Carl Cox, Dirty South, Oliver Heldens, Disclosure, Claude Vonstroke, and Guy Gerber have hosted events at the Miami Music Week Hotel during the past two editions of Miami Music Week.

=== 2020: Miami Music Week cancellation ===
Miami-Dade County declared a state of emergency due to the COVID-19 outbreak. This forced the Ultra Music Festival to postpone and shortly after, the Winter Music Conference followed suit. The Miami Music Week has returned since the initial lockdown of COVID-19, most recently occurring in March 2024.

== See also ==
- Ultra Music Festival
- Winter Music Conference
