= Cut Snake (band) =

Australian DJ

- Origin: Australia
- Genres: House; tech house; deep house
- Years active: 2012–present
- Label: Warner Bros.
- Members: Leigh Sedley
- Past members: Paul Fisher
- Website: https://www.cutsnake.com/

Cut Snake is Australian DJ Leigh "Sedz" Sedley. Cut Snake was originally a duo which also consisted of Paul "Fish" Fisher, but in mid-2018 Sedley announced that Cut Snake was now a solo act. Together the two chose the name based on the Australian expression "mad as a cut snake", meaning "crazy".

== History ==
Cut Snake originates from the Gold Coast of Australia, where both surfed from a young age. They got involved in dance music while they were touring world surf contests, and quickly grew passionate about the underground scenes from each country they visited. Mixmag described their music as "deep tech tunes at odds with their sun-soaked backgrounds" stating that they "have become famed for their massive personalities and infectious live shows."

Their debut EP, Life's a Beach, reached #5 on the iTunes Dance chart in Australia and it was played on Pete Tong's radio show BBC Radio 1 Essential Selection, along with support from Thomas Jack, Claude Von Stroke, Nic Fanciulli, and many others. In 2016 they released their Magic EP, which was described by Billboard as an "infectious tech house cut." On 7 May 2016 they played a live show in front of 20,000 people at the LA Convention Center. It was the venue's first live music event.

In March 2018, Fisher began releasing music under his own alias. In June, Sedley said that Fisher's recent music releases "went huge so fast that it was going to be too hard for him to juggle both projects. It made more sense for him to focus on himself."

== Discography ==
=== Extended plays ===
Title	Details
Life's a Beach	Released: November 2015; Label: Warner Bros. Records; Format: digital download streaming
Action Burger	Released: August 2016; Label: Warner Bros. Records; Format: digital download streaming
Want it All	Released: July 2018; Label: Desert Hearts Records; Format: digital download streaming
Switch Up	Released: October 2020; Label: Percomaniacs; Format: digital download streaming

=== Singles ===
Title	Year	EP
"No Way"	2013	
"Face Down"	2014	
"Jungle Shrimp"	2015	
"Echo"	2015	Life's a Beach
"Maybe Why Not" (with Wongo)	2015	Life's a Beach
"Magic"	2016	
"Boom Boom"	2016	Action Burger
"Dr. Um's" / "Party Tutorial"	2017	
"Chilimanjaro" (with Yolanda Be Cool)	2018	
"Lonely Nights" (with Nicky Night Time)	2018	
"Set me Free"	2019	
"Change Will Come"	2020	
"Forever" (with Quail)	2020	

=== Remixes ===
- Phoenix - "Entertainment" (Cut Snake Edit) (2013)
- Chet Faker - "1998" (Cut Snake Edit) (2014)
- Mikky Ekko - "Kids" (Cut Snake Remix) (2014)
- Shadowchild & Doorly - "Climbin' (Piano Weapon)" (Cut Snake Remix) (2015)
- Jad & the Ladyboy - "On Guard (feat. Blair De Milo)" (Cut Snake Remix) (2015)
- Major Lazer - "Be Together" (Cut Snake Remix) (2016)
- L D R U featuring Paige IV - "Keeping Score" (Cut Snake Remix) (2016)
- Alex Metric - "Drum Machine (feat. The New Sins)" (Cut Snake Remix) (2016)
- Tove Lo - "True Disaster" (Cut Snake Remix) (2017)
