= The War on Music =

The War on Music (also known as "The War on Festivals") is a phrase coined by Australian media to refer to the implementation of new laws by the New South Wales (NSW) Government with regard to the use of illicit drugs at concerts and music festivals. These proposed legislative changes come in response to a number of drug-related incidents occurring within Australian festivals. In response to these changes, NSW state politics has become divided on what actions are in the best interest of the state. With both support and opposition to the proposed laws, there is uncertainty as to what will happen to the future of Australia's music festival industry.

== Context ==
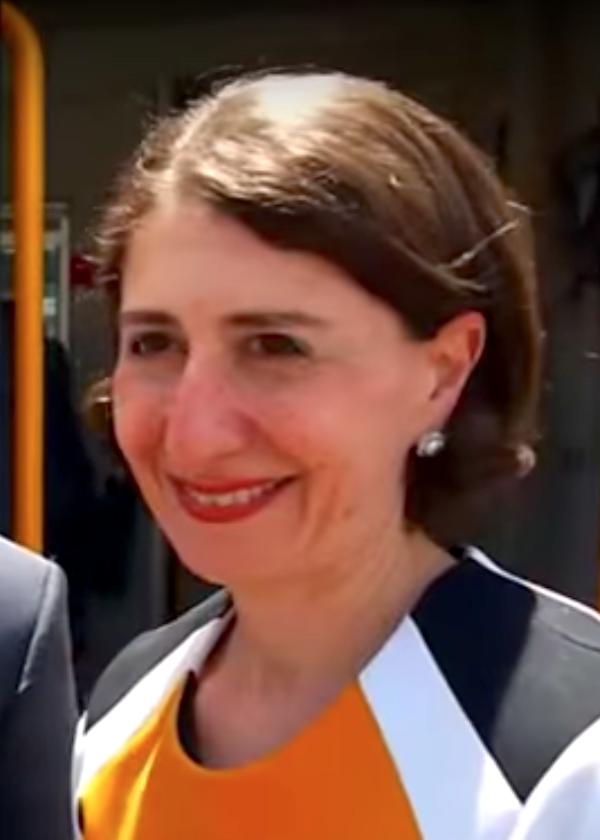
Current NSW Premier Gladys Berejiklian (2019)

This political movement can be traced back to the introduction of Sydney's lockout laws. These laws, introduced by the NSW government, aimed to reduce alcohol-related violence by prohibiting licensed venues from "admitting patrons after 1.30 am or serving alcohol after 3 am".

In a survey conducted by St Vincent's Hospital, "the incidence of general alcohol-related injuries was significantly lower one year after [the introduction of Sydney's lockout-laws]".

On the other hand, these laws have also had an impact on Sydney's nightlife economy, with the industry experiencing an estimated $16bn decrease in sales revenue every year. As a result, NSW saw a rise in commercial events that were not impacted by Sydney's lockout laws, such as day parties and boutique festivals.

Consequently, with the increased popularity of music festivals within NSW, there was a rise in the use of drugs at such events, causing the NSW government to take preliminary action. In 2018, the NSW Parliamentary Research Service (PRS) monitored the use of drugs at the 2018 Defqon.1 music festival. From their research, it was found that, of those searched, 20% of people attending the festival possessed drugs, with which 10 people were charged with supply offences. Furthermore, "two people attending the music festival died, another three were hospitalised in a critical condition and hundreds of others fell ill". Additionally, "a survey conducted at a major music festival in 2016 found that 60% of patrons had taken ecstasy in the last 12 months".

Following this, NSW State Premier Gladys Berejiklian sourced an expert panel to help devise laws that aimed to improve safety at music festivals, particularly in relation to the use of illicit drugs.

Soon after this, more drug-related incidents occurred during Western Sydney's Knockout Games of Destiny which we covered by multiple well-known Australian media outlets, inspiring more political discussion about drug safety. At this dance festival, one person died and sixteen others with hospitalised with suspected drug overdoses. This sparked more intense political debates on festival safety.

Furthermore, according to government health data, at least 66 young people were taken to emergency care from NSW music festivals over the summer of 2019.

== Legislation ==
=== Current legislation ===
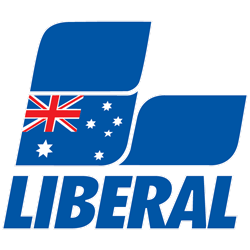
The NSW Liberal Party is the current party leading the legislative changes for NSW festivals.

Presently, the topic of drug use at festivals is treated differently in every state and, at a smaller scale, is determined by the local council with which the festival resides. As stated in the Expert Panel Report conducted by the PRS: "There is no common mechanism to facilitate consideration and planning around drug risk management. Operational arrangements to mitigate drug risk are often addressed within other event plans, such as medical and security plans."

There are however a few statewide regulations that must be met concerning drug safety. These include:

- Policing of events to prevent illicit drugs from entering and being consumed at the festival
- Safe drug and needle disposal

=== Proposed legislative changes ===
The report titled "Keeping People Safe at Music Festivals" (PRS) summarises the expert panel's recommendations for how the legislation should be changed to reduce the overall harm of drug use at festivals. The recommendations are as follows:

- Develop a consistent approach to the regulation of music festivals.
- Require organisers to develop and adhere to a Safety Management Plan for their event, supported by a two-tiered system of risk, with variable regulatory conditions.
- Consider establishing an interagency committee to assess and manage an event organiser’s approach to event risk.
- Strengthen drug and alcohol harm reduction programs for music festival attendees.
- Develop best practice guidelines for event organisers on harm reduction approaches and messages.
- Trial the use of Criminal Infringement Notices (on-the-spot fines) instead of Court Attendance Notices for drug possession offences at or in the vicinity of music festivals.
- Investigate introducing a new offence for those who supply illegal drugs, for financial or material gain, to people who then self-administer the drugs and die as a result.

In addition to these legislative changes proposed by the expert panel, a new form of risk assessment has been trialled by the NSW Government. In this, festivals are assessed on the potential "level of risk" they potentially impose on those attending. From the risk level assigned to the event, different levels of regulation will be imposed on the festival. For example, the FOMO music festival (an event that is held in several major cities around Australia) has been labelled as "higher risk under the new NSW licensing regulations". In January, the NSW Government announced that 14 festivals have been identified as high risk under the proposed festival regulations guideline.

Furthermore, as of 28 February 2019, a new Interim Guide for Music Festival Event Organisers has been introduced. These guidelines are intended to act as an interim standard of festival regulation in NSW while the state government continues to assess what long-term legislative changes must be made.

As of 29 May 2019, these proposed legislative changes are on track to be the subject of state inquiry (to which the bill has to be passed through the Legislative Assembly and Legislative Council to be ratified by the NSW Governor).

== Impact ==
The tightening of drug-related policies within festivals is predicted to have both a social and commercial impact. As of May 2019, the proposed laws made by the PRS's expert panel have yet to be acted upon. However, some events have already occurred that allow speculation as to what the future impact of these policies may be.

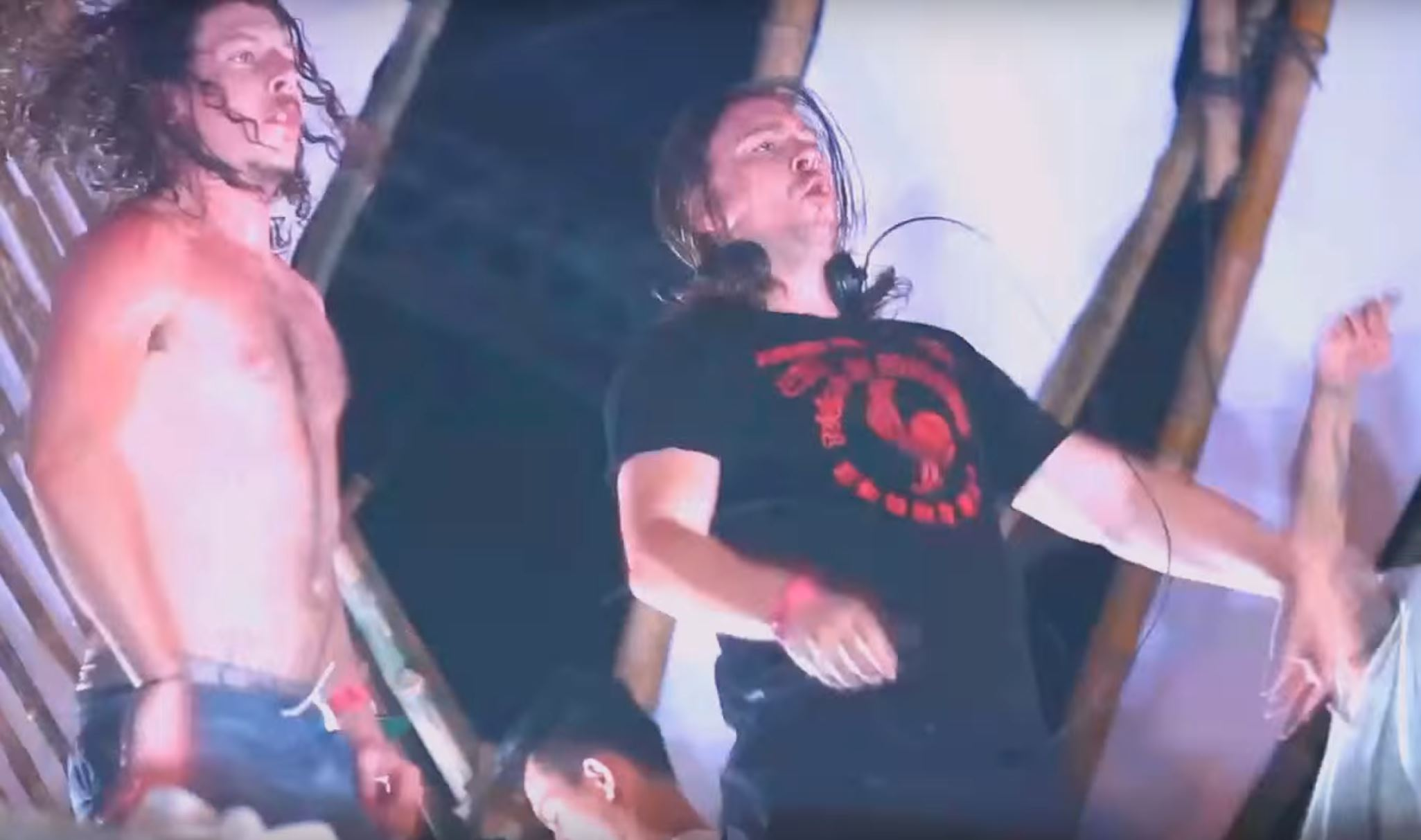
Australian band Peking Duk openly condemned the NSW Government's treatment of the Mountain Sounds Music Festival.

=== Effect on commercial businesses ===
On a commercial level, the increased regulation of festivals has already had an economic impact. In the case of Mountain Sounds 2019, the festival was hit with a "$200,000 quote for a police presence […] one week out from the festival". This additional requirement made by the local government meant that it was no longer economical for the event to carry on, leading to its cancellation two weeks before the intended start of the festival. The cancellation of the festival sparked a backlash from a variety of businesses, musicians, festival-goers and political parties.

Furthermore, these legislative changes could also see the loss of other music events. In some instances, festival organisers have threatened to move their event(s) to another state to avoid the commercial expense of tighter regulation. In the case of the Australian music festival BluesFest, the organisers suggested a move from Byron Bay (where the festival has been hosted for the past 29 years) to Queensland, after its 2019 event. However, in response to this, the NSW Premier Gladys Berejiklian ensured that the new regulations would only affect festivals that were deemed "high risk" of which BluesFest 2019 was not.

=== Effect on drug-related incidents ===
As the policies are yet to be acted on, statistical data has not been collected in order to assess the effectiveness of the proposed drug laws.

== Responses ==
=== Support of legislation change ===
The political party leading the legislative change is the NSW Liberal Party. Being re-elected into NSW state parliament in 2019, it is the intention of the Liberal Party to implement these new festival-safety policies during their current term. The intent to create a safer festival environment has been voiced by current NSW Premier Gladys Berejiklian: "We need to do everything we can to protect the safety of concert goers and people attending music festivals […] That is why I have tasked our health, law enforcement and regulatory experts to advise Government on what can be done immediately to improve safety at these events".

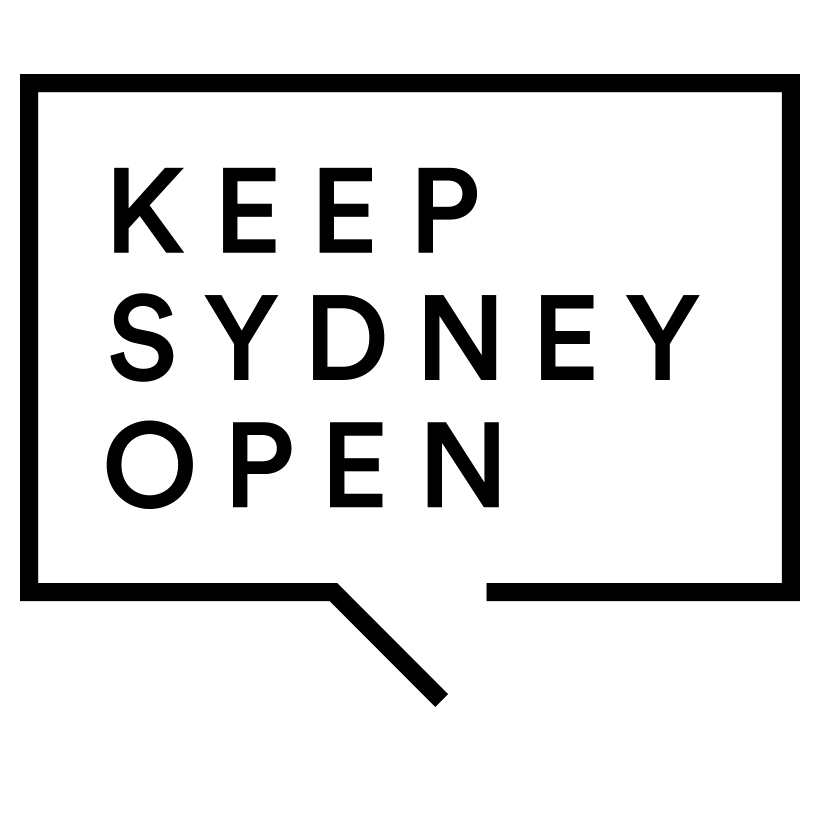
Keep Sydney Open Party Logo (2019)

=== Opposition to legislation change ===
As evident during the process of the 2019 NSW state election, several political parties opposed the Liberal Party's stance on drug safety at festivals. The Keep Sydney Open Party, which ran in the 2019 state election, was one of the parties that had drug liberalisation as part of its policies.

Furthermore, opposition to this legislative change has also been expressed by a variety of Australian artists, musicians, and others who are directly involved in the NSW music industry. Peking Duk, the award-winning Australian electronic music duo, went on record to challenge the newly proposed festival harm reduction guidelines. In reference to the events that saw the cancellation of the music festival Mountain Sounds 2019, group member Reuben Styles said: "The whole of NSW loves this festival. Ironically, it's one of the safest events in Australia. It doesn't make sense. Sadly, a few years ago when Mike Baird was premier, a lot of our favourite nightclubs around Sydney had to close. Gladys [Berejiklian] is furthering his work to destroy ... late-night economies." Styles continued on to say "We should be embracing music in this country and nurturing it. Not tearing it down." Other band member Adam Hyde has supported Styles' claims.

Also in the music industry, the chief executive of Live Performance Australia Evelyn Richardson openly professed her discontent with these proposed legislative changes. She went on record saying: "The safety of festival goers is paramount, but the NSW government's approach to festival safety appears to be designed to manage any risk by shutting them down altogether. Consultation with the industry has been absolutely woeful and whole sections of our industry are now being destroyed by a knee-jerk response from a government that couldn't care less."

==== Alternate legislative changes proposed by other parties ====
Along with other policies, the Keep Sydney Open Party opposed the need for "new licenses regulations for festivals" and supported the safe use of recreational drugs after a process known as "pill-testing". In this process, drugs taken into private venue/event are tested to assess their quality and thus determine whether they are safe for use. These stations are also intended to be used as a place to educate drug users on safe use and provide warnings for the potential side effects of its consumption.
