= Claude VonStroke =

American house music producer

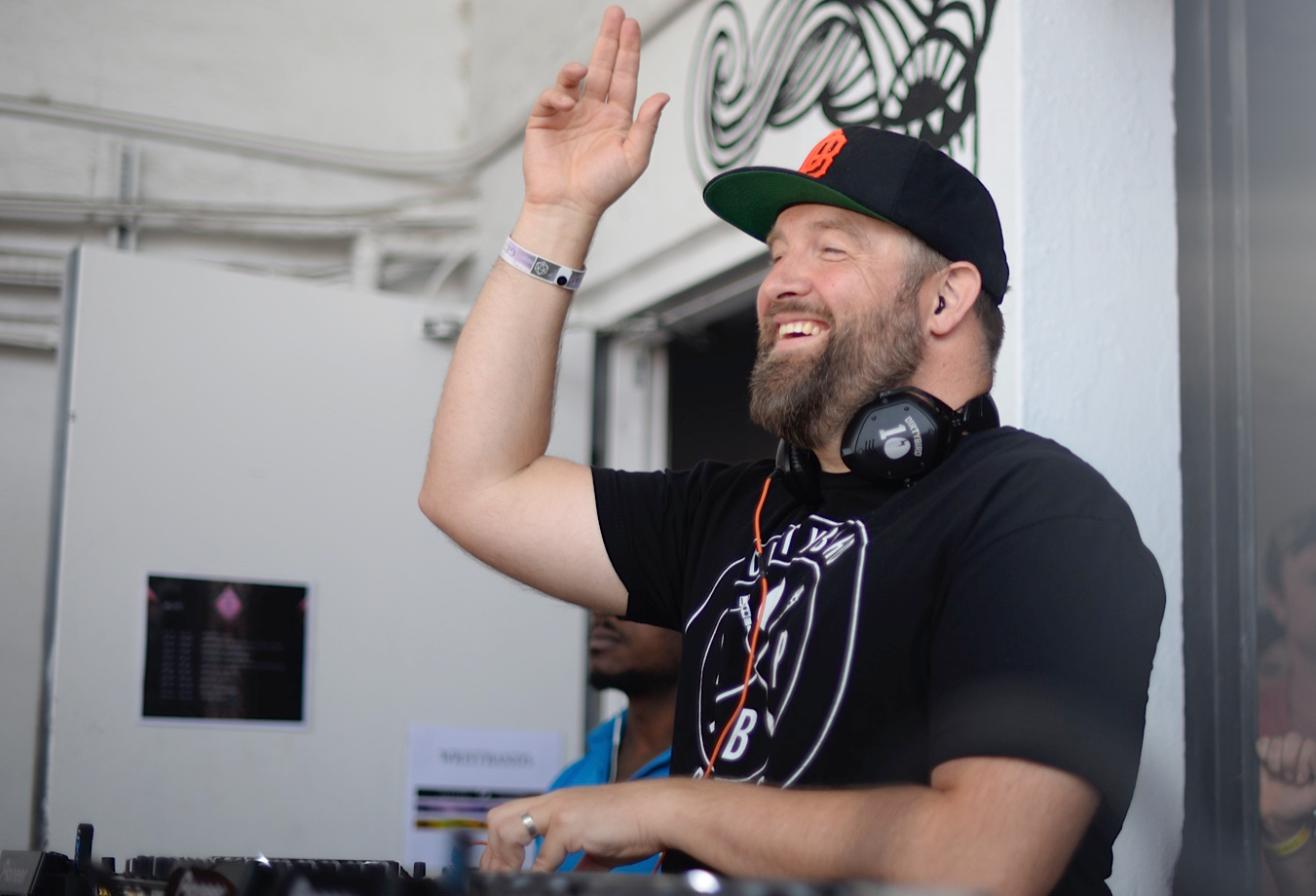

Background information
- Born: Barclay Macbride Crenshaw; July 7, 1971 (age 55); Cleveland, Ohio, U.S.
- Origin: Detroit, Michigan, United States
- Genres: House, tech house, deep house, minimal, ghettotech
- Occupations: DJ, Producer
- Years active: 2003–present
- Labels: Dirtybird Records, Mothership, Get Real (with Green Velvet)

Barclay Macbride Crenshaw (born July 7, 1971), who is known by the stage name Claude VonStroke, is an American house producer based in Los Angeles. He owned Dirtybird Records based in San Francisco. In July 2006 he released his debut album, Beware of the Bird. He has produced a 'Fabric' mix, which was released in May 2009, and has also appeared on Pete Tong's Essential Mix Radio show in 2007, 2013, and 2020. In 2009, he released his second studio album, Bird Brain. In 2016, he was named America's Best DJ in Pioneer DJ and DJ Times' annual poll. In 2017, he was nominated at the Electronic Music Awards for both DJ of the Year and Radio Show of the Year for "The Birdhouse".

== Biography ==
Barclay Macbride Crenshaw was born in Cleveland, Ohio and lived there until he was in seventh grade. His family then moved to Detroit. Having his own radio show in high school, Crenshaw had an interest in hip-hop music at first, but then embraced electronic music. Later he moved to Los Angeles, where he worked on numerous movie productions as location scout and production assistant. From 2002 to 2003, he worked on the documentary Intellect: Techno House Progressive, for which he interviewed more than 50 DJs.

In the early 2000s, Claude met up with "The Martin Brothers," Justin Martin and Christian Martin. In January 2005 he formed the Dirtybird Records label. His wife, Aundy, helped fund the original start of the Dirtybird label under the holding Company Crenshaw Creative, of which Aundy is now the chief operating officer and chief marketing officer. She gave him one year to turn it into a successful record label and would have cut him off if the label did not succeed. The Fabric imprint invited Barclay early in his DJ career to do a mix, and he accepted saying, "Fabric called me, and of course I agreed without hesitation. I have wanted to mix one of the Fabric series since I started DJing house. I feel like it is a nice achievement for a DJ, something that says, 'OK, this person is legit.'"

== Dirtybird records ==
Crenshaw's record label, Dirtybird Records is an independent electronic music record label. In 2017, Mixmag named Dirtybird "label of the decade," and Billboard Magazine named the label one of "the best 5 independent dance labels of 2017." Notable artists from the label include Justin Martin, Steve Darko, Walker & Royce, and Green Velvet.

== Recent projects ==
In 2014, Claude began collaborating with Green Velvet (another veteran artist who grew up in the Mid-West), to form a side project known as Get Real. The duo first met during the Winter Music Conference in Miami where the two were accidentally scheduled simultaneously. Their first release came out as an EP on Dirtybird, with the appearance of "Mind Yo Bizness" and "Snuffaluffagus". Claude has stated, "Nobody is trying to steal the spotlight or take over the project which isn't always the case in a duo. We each represent our style but we make a new style by working together."

Claude also debuted another project (this time in 2015) which he has continued with til today – Barclay Crenshaw. His self-titled debut album kicked off his "left-field departure from his better-known alias, Claude VonStroke" by delivering "slowed-down, emotive collection of collaborations and instrumentals" or otherwise touted as 'alien hip hop music'. In November 2023, Claude announced on his socials that we was taking a hiatus from Claude VonStroke and as he was focusing his energy on Barclay Crenshaw, citing, "A new bass era begins!".

== Discography ==
Studio albums

- 2006: Beware of the Bird
- 2009: Bird Brain
- 2013: Urban Animal
- 2017: Barclay Crenshaw
- 2020: Freaks & Beaks

Extended plays

- 2021: Enthusiasm (with Walker & Royce)
- 2021: Everything Is Burning (with Nala)

Singles

- 2006: The Whistler
- 2006: Deep Throat
- 2006: Who's Afraid of Detroit?
- 2007: Groundhog Day
- 2008: Scarlet Macaw
- 2009: Beat That Bird (with Justin Martin)
- 2009: Vocal Chords
- 2009: Monster Island
- 2010: California (with J Phlip)
- 2012: Ignorance Is Bliss (with Eats Everything)
- 2012: Le Fantome (with Jaw)
- 2016: The Rain Break
- 2018: Walay (My Bae)
- 2018: Raw Nerve
- 2018: Maharaja
- 2019: Comments (with ZDS featuring Ke)
- 2020: All the People in the House
- 2020: I'm Solo (featuring Barry Drift)
- 2020: Fly Guy (with Marc Houle)
- 2020: Raggadagga (with Catz 'n Dogz)

Remixes

- 2006: Soul Avengerz Feat. Javine – Don't Let The Morning Come (Claude Von Stroke and Justin Martin Remix)
- 2006: Fedde Le Grand – Put Your Hands Up for Detroit (Claude Von Stroke Packard Plant Remix)
- 2006: Andy Caldwell – Warrior (Claude VonStroke Sharp Toof Mix)
- 2007: Samim – Heater (Claude VonStroke Remix)
- 2007: The Rapture – W.A.Y.U.H. (Whoo! Alright – Yeah ... Uh Huh) People Don't Dance No More (Claude's Vocal Pantydropper Mix)
- 2007: Mighty Dub Katz – Magic Carpet Ride (Claude Vonstroke 'Sucker Free City Edition')
- 2009: Kevin Saunderson – The Human Bond (Claude VonStroke Rave Recognize Rave Mix)
- 2010: Chilly Gonzales – I Am Europe (Claude Von Stroke Take A Trip Mix)
- 2010: Cajmere – Percolator (Claude VonStroke Remix)
- 2012: Kimbra – Old Flame (Claude VonStroke Remix)
- 2015: Rihanna – Bitch Better Have My Money (Claude VonStroke Remix)
- 2015: The Chemical Brothers – Go (Claude VonStroke Remix)
- 2015: Disclosure – Omen (Claude VonStroke Remix)
- 2017: Rodriguez Jr. - An Evidence of Time (Claude VonStroke Remix)
- 2018: Elderbrook - Capricorn (Claude VonStroke Remix)
- 2018: Tom Flynn featuring Amp Fiddler - The Future (Claude VonStroke Remix)
- 2020: Marc Houle - Arizona (Claude VonStroke Remix)
