= Stay (Fisher song) =

Single by Fisher
- Released: 21 March 2025
- Length: 2:45
- Label: Catch & Release
- Songwriters: Paul Fisher; Mike Chapman; Nicky Chinn; Brycen Lynch; Joseph Pepin; Justin Shukat; Jack Wirth
- Producer: Fisher

Fisher singles chronology
"Ocean" (2024)	"Stay" (2025)	"Blackberries" (2025)

"Stay" is a song by Australian producer Fisher released as a single in March 2025 through Catch & Release. The song samples "Kiss You All Over" by Exile.

The song placed at number 32 in the Triple J Hottest 100, 2025.

At the 2025 ARIA Music Awards, the song was nominated for Best Dance/Electronic Release and Song of the Year. At the 2026 Queensland Music Awards, the song won Highest Selling Single. At the AIR Awards of 2026, it was nominated for Best Independent Dance / Club Single.

== Reception ==
Harry Levin from Beatportal said "Continuing his impeccable reputation for groove, this sun-drenched new production arrives just in time for spring with its shelf life sure to last long into the summer. The inspiring choral layers and bouncing piano paint an immaculate sonic picture to pair with a beachside set." Ansh Talim from EDM.com said "With a nostalgic sample and his club-ready production, the soulful track is both a nod to classic dance music and a fresh take on contemporary house."

We Rave You said "Built around the repeated vocal of 'stay with me' and enhanced by additional vocal bursts and runs, the track embodies a summer spirit and the fun that has been captured throughout Fisher's career."

== Charts ==
Weekly chart performance for "Stay"
Chart (2025)	Peak position
Australian Artist (ARIA)	9
New Zealand Hot Singles (RMNZ)	7

=== Year-end charts ===
2025 year-end chart performance for "Stay"
Chart (2025)	Position
Australian Artist (ARIA)	36

== Certifications ==
Certifications for "Stay"
Region	Certification	Certified units/sales
New Zealand (RMNZ)	Gold	15,000^{‡}
^{‡} Sales+streaming figures based on certification alone.
