= Take It Off (Fisher song) =

Single by Fisher and Aatig
- Released: 9 June 2023
- Length: 3:02
- Label: Catch & Release
- Songwriters: Paul Fisher; Thomas Earnshaw; Gita Lake
- Producer: Fisher

Fisher singles chronology
"Yeah the Girls" (2022)	"Take It Off" (2023)	"Atmosphere" (2023)

Music video
- "Take It Off" on YouTube

"Take It Off" is a song by Australian producer Fisher and Aatig released as a single on 9 June 2023 through Catch & Release.

The Corey Wilson-directed video was released on 1 August 2023.

At the 2023 ARIA Music Awards, the song was nominated for Best Dance Release.

At the 2024 Electronic Dance Music Awards, the song was nominated for House Song of the Year, Dance Song of the Year, Music Video of the Year and won Tech House Song of the Year.

== Reception ==
Jo Forrest from Total Ntertainment said, "Combining funk-laden bass, swooning synths and AATIG's addictive lead vocal over a deep pulsating groove, 'Take It Off' sets the tone for a typically jam-packed club and festival season for the Australian superstar."

== Charts ==
Weekly chart performance for "Take It Off"
Chart (2023–2024)	Peak position
New Zealand Hot Singles (RMNZ)	14
US Dance Club Songs (Billboard)	17

== Certifications ==
Certifications for "Take It Off"
Region	Certification	Certified units/sales
New Zealand (RMNZ)	Gold	15,000^{‡}
^{‡} Sales+streaming figures based on certification alone.
