= Losing It (song) =

Single by Fisher
- Released: 13 July 2018
- Genre: Tech house
- Length: 4:08
- Label: Catch & Release; Astralwerks
- Songwriter: Paul Fisher
- Producer: FISHER

Fisher singles chronology
"Crowd Control" (2018)	"Losing It" (2018)	"You Little Beauty" (2019)

"Losing It" is a song by Australian producer Fisher, released as a standalone single on 13 July 2018 through Catch & Release. It was a commercial success, reaching number one on the Australian Club Tracks chart and the US Dance Club Songs chart, and also charted in Flanders and the top 25 of the US Dance/Electronic Songs chart.

It was ranked at number 2 in Australian youth broadcaster Triple J's Hottest 100 of 2018.

At the ARIA Music Awards of 2018, the song was nominated for Best Dance Release. At the AIR Awards of 2019, the song was nominated for Best Independent Dance, Electronica Or Club Single.

In February 2019, at the 61st Annual Grammy Awards, it was nominated for Best Dance Recording.

At the 2019 International Dance Music Awards, the song won Best Electronic Song.

== Background ==
After Fisher performed the track in one of two sets he performed at the Coachella Valley Music and Arts Festival in 2017, the song became widely bootlegged by other DJs, so Fisher officially released the track himself in July 2018. The ABC said the track has a "throbbing bass-aided beat".

== Critical reception ==
Billboard ranked "Losing It" third among the 30 best Dance/Electronic songs picked by its Dance/Electronic writing staff in its 2018 year-end review. Writer Kat Bein notes, "You couldn't go to a dance music festival in 2018 without hearing this song's booming bass drop and catchy vocal some 50 times. [...] Everyone from David Guetta to Paul van Dyk and Afrojack has thrown it into their sets, helping turn the collective creative tide toward a deeper, more minimal headspace."

Billboard also placed "Losing It" 84th out of the 100 Best Songs released in 2018 as picked by its Hot 100 staff. Writer David Rishty notes that "The intoxicating house single has been played out by hundreds of touring acts, including Skrillex and Tiësto, in addition to BBC Radio 1 curators like Annie Nightingale and MistaJam. The song has also spent a whopping 15 weeks and counting on Billboard's Hot Dance/Electronic Songs chart and continues to rise through the ranks, so we're likely going to be losing it to this one well into 2019."

It has the record of being the track that spent the most time in the 1st position of the Beatport Top 100 (62 days).

The Dave Winnel "For the Win" Remix was also very popular in the sets of DJs such as Armin van Buuren, Tiësto and Nicky Romero.

== Charts ==
=== Weekly charts ===
Chart (2018–2019)	Peak position
Australia (ARIA)	35
Australia Club Tracks (ARIA)	1
Belgium (Ultratop 50 Flanders)	26
Hungary (Dance Top 40)	4
Hungary (Single Top 40)	13
Ireland (IRMA)	60
New Zealand Hot Singles (RMNZ)	17
Scotland Singles (OCC)	42
UK Singles (OCC)	60
UK Dance (OCC)	9
US Dance Club Songs (Billboard)	1
US Hot Dance/Electronic Songs (Billboard)	22

=== Year-end charts ===
Chart (2018)	Position
Hungary (Dance Top 40)	56

Chart (2019)	Position
Australian Artist (ARIA)	31
Hungary (Dance Top 40)	7
US Dance Club Songs (Billboard)	18
US Hot Dance/Electronic Songs (Billboard)	90

Chart (2020)	Position
Hungary (Dance Top 40)	19

== Certifications ==
Region	Certification	Certified units/sales
Australia (ARIA)	4× Platinum	280,000^{‡}
Austria (IFPI Austria)	Platinum	30,000^{‡}
Brazil (Pro-Música Brasil)	2× Platinum	80,000^{‡}
Denmark (IFPI Danmark)	Gold	45,000^{‡}
France (SNEP)	Platinum	200,000^{‡}
Germany (BVMI)	Gold	200,000^{‡}
Italy (FIMI)	Platinum	70,000^{‡}
New Zealand (RMNZ)	3× Platinum	90,000^{‡}
Poland (ZPAV)	Platinum	20,000^{‡}
Spain (Promusicae)	Platinum	60,000^{‡}
United Kingdom (BPI)	Platinum	600,000^{‡}
United States (RIAA)	Gold	500,000^{‡}
^{‡} Sales+streaming figures based on certification alone.

== See also ==
- List of number-one club tracks of 2018 (Australia)
- List of Billboard number-one dance songs of 2018
