= Rising & Falling =

Studio album by Layo & Bushwacka!
- Released: March 26, 2012
- Label: Olmeto
- Producers: Layo Paskin, Matthew Benjamin

Layo & Bushwacka! chronology
Global Underground 033: Rio (2007)	Rising & Falling (2012)

Rising & Falling is the fourth album by electronic music duo Layo & Bushwacka!.

== Track listing ==
No.	Title	Length
1.	"Intro"	1:18
2.	"Delta Ahead"	7:43
3.	"Emotional Intelligence"	3:54
4.	"The Way Home"	2:50
5.	"Can't Hurt You" (featuring Kim Ann Foxman)	5:03
6.	"Thylacine"	5:16
7.	"The Big Dream" (featuring Winter Kills)	4:57
8.	"Raw Defined"	5:38
9.	"5AM"	6:39
10.	"Born In The Backwoods"	6:05
11.	"Tender Love" (featuring Mina Vico)	3:02
12.	"Dancing In The Dark" (featuring Cevin Fisher)	5:16
13.	"Killer On The Loose"	3:15
14.	"Close To Me"	5:01
15.	"Rising & Falling"	6:48
