= Nathan Coles =

British tech house DJ (1970–2023)

- Born: 10 May 1970
- Origin: London, United Kingdom
- Died: 12 February 2023 (aged 52)
- Genres: Tech house
- Occupations: DJ; producer
- Years active: 1990–2023

Nathan Coles (10 May 1970 - 12 February 2023), was a British tech house DJ. Described as an "originator of tech house" and a "towering figure of the tech house scene," he played a pivotal role in shaping the UK's tech house scene during the late 1990s and 2000s.

== Career ==
Coles began his career by organizing numerous parties and underground raves across London during the early 1990s. He first gained recognition for organizing the renowned Release parties. In 1994, he co-founded the influential UK tech-house event Wiggle alongside Terry Francis, featuring renowned DJs such as Richie Hawtin, Layo & Bushwacka!, and Mr. G. Wiggle quickly gained prominence, and Coles, Francis, and fellow resident Eddie Richards held a residency at Fabric for over a decade. He was a central figure in the UK's tech house scene from the late 1990s through the 2000s. After a hiatus, Wiggle re-launched both its label and party series in 2019 to commemorate its 25th anniversary.

Coles released music under various aliases, most notably as Get Fucked, as well as Two Right Wrongans, Housey Doingz, and The Delinquents. He collaborated with artists like Francis, Mr. C, Silverlining, and Nils Hess. His productions appeared on labels such as Groove Pleasure, 10 Kilo, Hotkitchen! Records, and his own imprint, Is This. Mixmag credits Coles with "producing a number of the nascent scene's most lasting and iconic tracks".

In addition to his live DJ performances, Coles also enjoyed a prolific career in music production, amassing over 200 releases on his own labels, Wiggle Records and Is This Music.

== Death ==
On 15 February 2023, Coles' sons, Fabian and Josh, confirmed on his Facebook profile that he had died by suicide on February 12, 2023, following severe mental health issues.

Tributes were widely shared on social media mourning Coles' passing. Carl Loben, DJ Mag's editor-in-chief, remembered him as a tech-house pioneer, from co-founding Wiggle parties with Terry Francis to his impactful Get Fucked alias. Simone Butler of Primal Scream hailed him as a scene figurehead, recalling her time at Wiggle and admiration for his releases.

== Discography ==
=== Albums and EPs ===
- Pick-N-Mix EP (Wiggle, 1996) (as Housey Doingz)
- Tech House Phenomena, Vol. 2 (Euka/Eukahouse, 1999)
- Give Me a Break (10 Kilo, 2005)
- Twelve Upheavals That Brought the Redwoods to Flight (Facehead, 2005)
- Wiggle for 20 Years (Fabric, 2014)
