= Boost Up =

Single by Fisher and Flowdan
- Released: 9 August 2024
- Length: 3:31
- Label: Catch & Release
- Songwriters: Marc Anthony Veira; Thomas Earnshaw; Paul Fisher
- Producer: Fisher

Fisher singles chronology
"Atmosphere" (2023)	"Boost Up" (2024)	"Ocean" (2024)

Music video
- "Boost Up" on YouTube

"Boost Up" is a song by Australian producer Fisher and English record producer Flowdan released as a single on 9 August 2024 through Catch & Release. Flowdan described the song as "the Energizer Bunny's theme tune."

The song placed at number 88 in the Triple J Hottest 100, 2024.

At the 2025 Electronic Dance Music Awards, the song won Tech House Song of the Year.

== Reception ==
Christian Eede from DJ Mag said the song "sees Fisher introduce breakbeat elements into his tech-house sound".

Beat Portal said "Flowdan's voice is perfect as an instrument alongside Fisher's bouncy drum beat and sporadic synths. It's an energy drink in song form"

== Charts ==
Weekly chart performance for "Boost Up"
Chart (2024)	Peak position
New Zealand Hot Singles (RMNZ)	8
UK Singles Downloads (OCC)	95
