= The End (club) =

Nightclub in the West End of London

Coordinates: 51.5167°N 0.1254°W

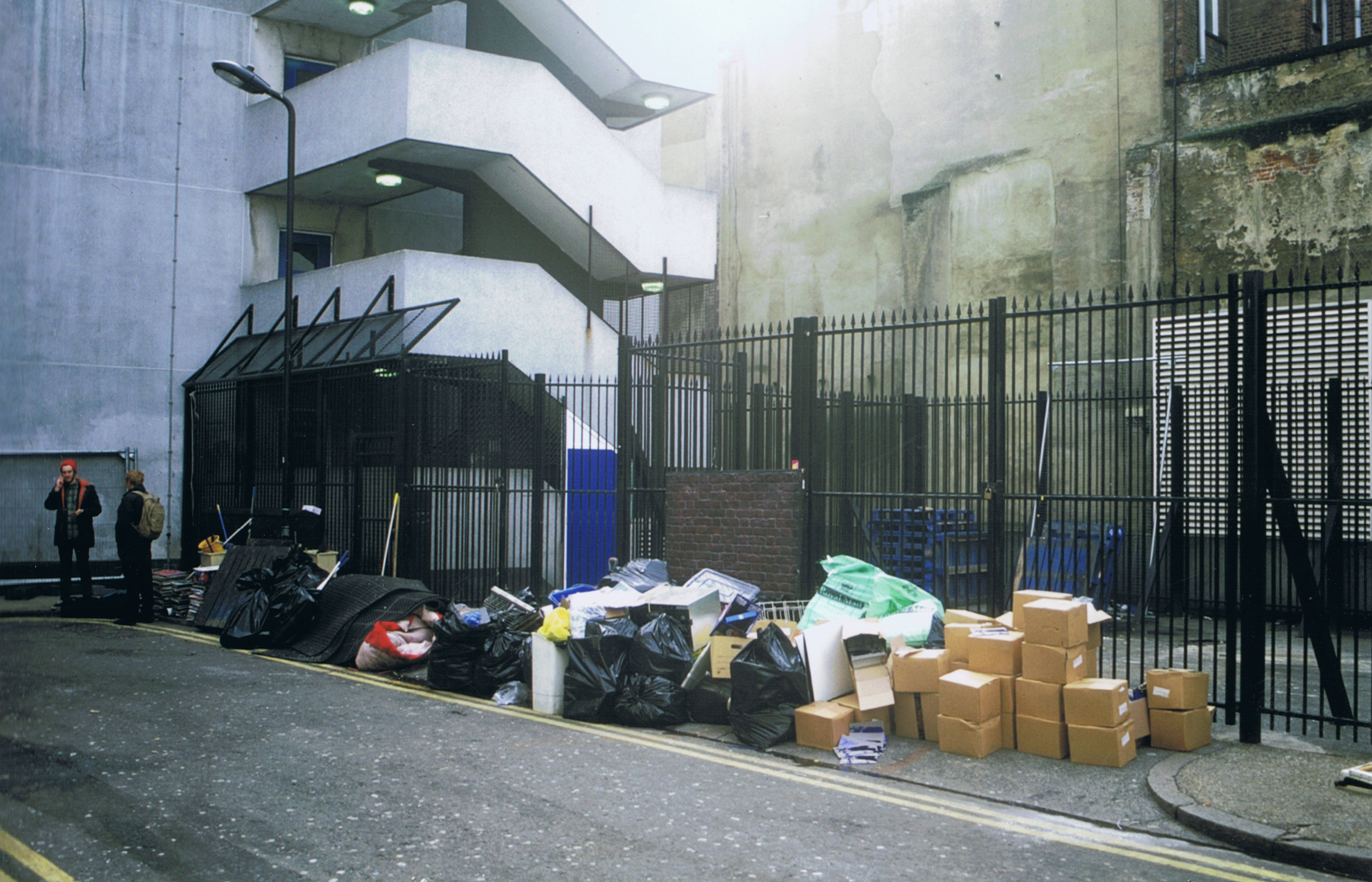
- The End of The End. Contents of the club's offices awaiting collection, January 2009.
- Interactive map of The End
- Location: Bloomsbury, London
- Capacity: 1,200
- Type: Nightclub

Construction
- Opened: 1995
- Closed: 2009

Website
- endclub.com

The End was a nightclub in the West End of London, England. Started in December 1995 by DJs Layo Paskin and Mr C, it was also responsible for the label End Recordings.

Musical genres played at The End included techno and house on Saturday nights, drum and bass and breakbeat on Friday night, and indie on Monday with a night called Trash. The End also hosted other nights throughout the week and weekend, including a dubstep night on Wednesdays, along with DTPM on Sunday afternoons.

== History ==
The club was designed by Douglas Paskin, Layo Paskins father. In late 1995, the opening of the club started to be advertised via posters that read "The End is coming". Mr C put down a deposit on the venue and they were lent £250,000 by a bank to start the business and raised £400,000 via investors. The club opened its doors on Saturday the 2 December 1995. Historically, the venue housed the Post Office's delivery horses.

Since its opening in 1995, many of the world's finest DJs played and/or hosted nights at The End at significant points in their careers. Roni Size won the Mercury Music Prize whilst hosting a residency at the club in 1997 and Stewart Essence (Elusivewax) was known for his ground breaking deep house sets at The End. Fatboy Slim was resident at the club when he went to number one in the UK charts in 1998. The club had a capacity of 800 and 1,000 including the AKA bar, that opened in 1998.

Layo & Bushwacka! released album Lowlife in 1999, Zero 7 were residents at the club for two years in the run-up to the 2001 release of Simple Things, Scissor Sisters played their first UK gig at the club, and Erol Alkan went from being chosen as Best Breakthrough DJ at the 2002 Muzik Awards through to winning Mixmag's DJ of the year in 2006. LCD Soundsystem played their second-ever show at The End in 2002. Tomoki Tamura was a resident at the club. By 2005, The End was a profitable and legitimate business with a turnover of more than £5 million and profits of £500,000.

The club closed in 2009. On the last night The End hosted a 24-hour party. Shortly before closing, Marley Jaye, who hosted nights at the Egg, commented: "In clubbing circles The End was seen as something of an institution, a proper super club. It was the kind of place where you knew you were guaranteed to see some really big names play some amazing sets. It definitely feels like an end of an era moment." In October 2025, a three night event was held at Camden's KOKO venue, to celebrate 30 years of The End, called ‘This is The End, 1995–2025: Defining an Era’.

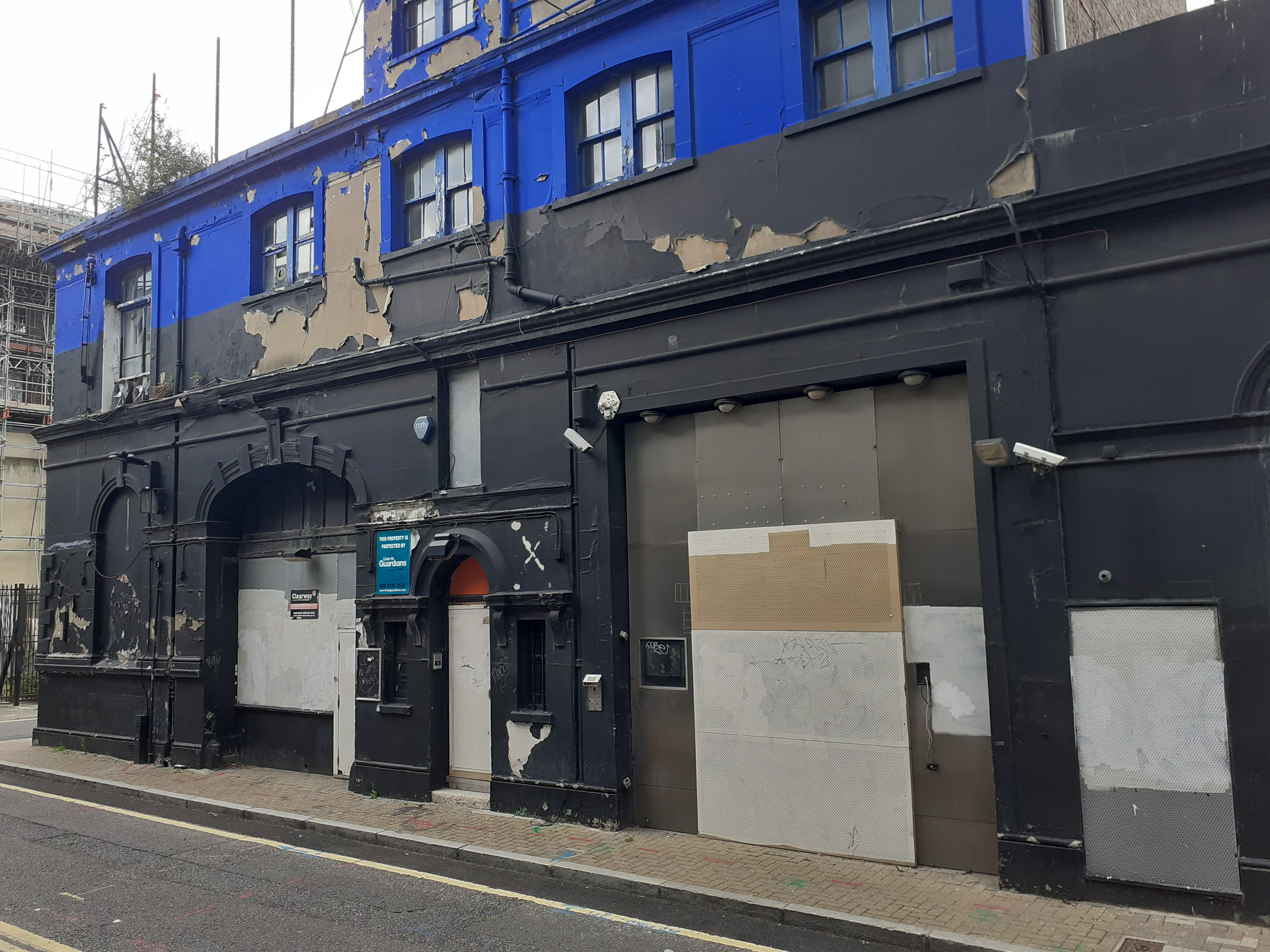
The Remains of The End, in 2022

== Reopening as The Den ==
After the club closed, it was due to be re-developed and turned into residential housing. It was purchased for £8 million. Due to a slump in the property market, the property developers decided against turning The End into a block of flats and re-opened it as a club. Lee Bennett who used to run the Astoria and Bagley's clubs, was involved in it re-opening in May 2009 as The Den. The Den itself subsequently closed in July 2012 when its licence was revoked by a magistrates court following a series of complaints and reports of shootings, stabbings and drug dealing. The site remained derelict for many years but as of 2024, it is expected to be re-developed.

== See also ==
- List of electronic dance music venues
- Superclub
