= Terry Francis =

British DJ and producer

Terry Francis (born 28 July 1966) is a British tech house DJ and producer. Francis won Muzik Magazine's "Best New DJ" award in 1997. In October 1999, at the club's inception, he started a residency at London's Fabric, which has continued ever since.

He has worked as a producer under his own name and as Housey Doingz (with Nathan Coles). He has released several mix albums, including two volumes of Architecture and the second volume of the Fabric mix series, Fabric 02.

== Discography ==
- Gasworks (2015), Default Position
- Architecture (1998), ARK 21
- Architecture Vol 2 (1998), Pagan America
- Freezeinwithm (2000), Ches-nut-cat
- DJ Magazine Presents UCMG UK Selected Cuts (2001), DJ Magazine
- Fabric 02 (2002), Fabric
- Fabric 28 (2006), Fabric, as Wiggle with Nathan Coles
