= Mountain Sounds (festival) =

Music festival in Australia

Mountain Sounds Festival
- Genre: Australian, Rock, Alternative Rock, Indie Rock, Hip-hop, Electronic
- Dates: February
- Locations: Mount Penang Parklands, Central Coast, New South Wales, Australia (2014-2019)
- Years active: 2014–2019
- Website: http://mountainsoundsfestival.com.au/

Mountain Sounds Festival was an annual over 18's boutique music festival that was held in Central Coast (New South Wales), Australia. The first festival was held on Saturday 15 March 2014. The festival was cancelled in 2019 just a week before it was set to begin on 19 February, due to New South Wales’ strict festival legislation, with organisers citing the imposition of further conditions and financial obligations on the festival which were impossible to meet.

== Lineups year by year ==
As listed on the official website.

=== 2014 ===
- Ball Park Music
- Beni
- Canyons (DJ Set)
- Cosmo's Midnight
- Emma Louise
- The Holidays
- Jinja Safari
- LDRU
- Midnight Juggernauts (DJ Set)
- Snakadaktal
- Softwar
- Sticky Fingers (band)
- Wordlife (live)
- Yacht Club DJs
- Yolanda Be Cool
- World’s End Press
- SOSUEME DJs
- Sea Legs
- Tropical Zombie
- The Lazys
- Buzz Kull
- Roof
- Elliot The Bull
- Thieves
- Slow Blow
- Parkside

=== 2015 ===
- Alison Wonderland
- Touch Sensitive
- Carmada
- D.D Dumbo
- DZ Deathrays
- The Griswolds
- E^ST
- Winterbourne
- Odd Mob
- Little Earthquake
- Acaddamy
- PH Fat
- Nova & the Experience
- Dr Kong & the Stem Cells
- AViVAA
- Owen Rabbit
- Colour Cage
- White Walkers
- Rookie
- Via Alchemy
- East of Here
- Coda
- Daniel Lee Kendall
- Harper
- Hatch
- The Jungle Giants
- Kilter
- Lemond
- The Kite String Tangle
- Luke Million
- Northeast Party House
- Pepa Knight
- Ratlife DJs
- Safia (band)
- Stephane 1993
- Sydney Social DJs
- Tkay Maidza
- Tropical Zombie
- Zavier

=== 2016 ===
- Albert Hammond Jr. (USA)
- Alpine (band)
- Art Vs Science
- Cut Snake (band)
- The Delta Riggs
- Green Buzzard
- Harts
- Hockey Dad
- Holy Holy
- I Know Leopard
- Jack Beats (UK)
- The Jezabels
- The Lazys
- Motez (producer)
- Nina Las Vegas
- Ocean Alley
- Odd Mob
- Sea Legs
- Set Mo
- Skegss
- Slumberjack
- Tropical Zombie
- World Champion
- Violent Soho

plus:

- Bass RQ
- Bodega Collective
- Catalyst
- Elwood Myre
- Goonz
- Ivy
- J-Ray
- Jaket
- Jimmi Walker
- Man To Moon
- The Moving Stills
- Paperfox
- Pear
- Peekay
- Roof
- Savilian
- SnilluM
- Stay Sane
- The Sea Gypsies
- Tom Hogan
- Twin Caverns
- Voyage IV

=== 2017 ===
- RÜFÜS
- Hermitude
- DMA's
- Dune Rats
- Ngaiire
- Skegss
- Mosquito Coast (band)
- The Gooch Palms
- Bec Sandridge
- Poolclvb
- These New South Whales
- The Ruminaters
- Tropical Zombie
- Rackett
- Betty & Oswald
- Stay At Home Mum
- Voyage IV
- Raave Tapes
- Catayst
- Sammi Constantine
- The Moving Stills
- Elaskia
- Vacations
- Geords
- Man To Moon
- Hayden Shepherd
- Joel & Leroy
- Bodega Collective
- Nelipot
- David Bangma
- Soy
- Strange Associates
- Lunar DJs
- Cabal DJs
- TillDawn
- Seany P
- Stoive
- Samuel Kirk
- BBQ Baz
- J-Ray
- Terminus43
- Steve Pike
- Bass RQ
- Bad Decisions

Magic Mountain Party Lineup

- Torren Foot
- Nicky Night Time
- Motorik Vibe Council
- Commandeur (Drummer) (DJ set)
- Barney Cools DJs
- Bare Essentials DJs
- Kinder (band) DJs
- Cabal DJs
- Lunar DJs

=== 2018 ===
- Peking Duk
- Alex The Astronaut
- Ali Barter
- Amy Shark
- The Creases
- Fisher
- Gang Of Youths
- GL
- Grouplove (USA)
- Hayden James
- Hockey Dad
- Hot Dub Time Machine
- Kirin J. Callinan
- Motez (producer)
- Nathan Barato (CAN)
- Paces (musician)
- Safia (band)
- Touch Sensitive
- The Preatures
- Barney Cools DJs
- Bard
- Bass-RQ
- Baz
- Bean Dip
- Bodega Collective
- Cabal DJs
- Cassette
- Charles
- Chymes
- Classica
- Club Raiders DJs
- Conspiracy Crew
- Cosmic Ken
- Cpt Rhys
- David Bangma
- Desiki Dominique
- Elaskia
- Elijah Something
- Eluera
- Exhibitionist
- Fripps & Fripps
- Geords
- Gibson Brothers
- Hannah
- Hayden Shepherd
- Ivy
- Jimmi Walker
- Jimmy 2 Sox B2B Tim Fuchs
- Joel Leggett
- Joseph Raymond & Louis Stenmark
- Kurt King
- Little Quirks
- Los Scallywaggs
- LTPD DJs
- Luca Cavallaro
- Mason Clarke
- Moondogs
- Nelipot
- Ninajirachi
- Not Eve
- Oh?
- Peekay
- Persian Rug
- Pist Idiots
- PITD
- Rachel Maria Cox
- Raave Tapes
- Sam Kirk
- Sammi Constantine
- Seany P
- Sequel
- Soy
- Steamboat Hollow
- Steve Pike
- Stoive
- The Jim Mitchells
- The Moving Stills
- The Sea Gypsies
- Tia Gostelow
- Tilldawn
- Triple j unearthed winner
- Tropical Zombie
- Vena Klymo
- Wales
- Waxfinz
- Will Collard & Josh Gapes
