= Marc Houle =

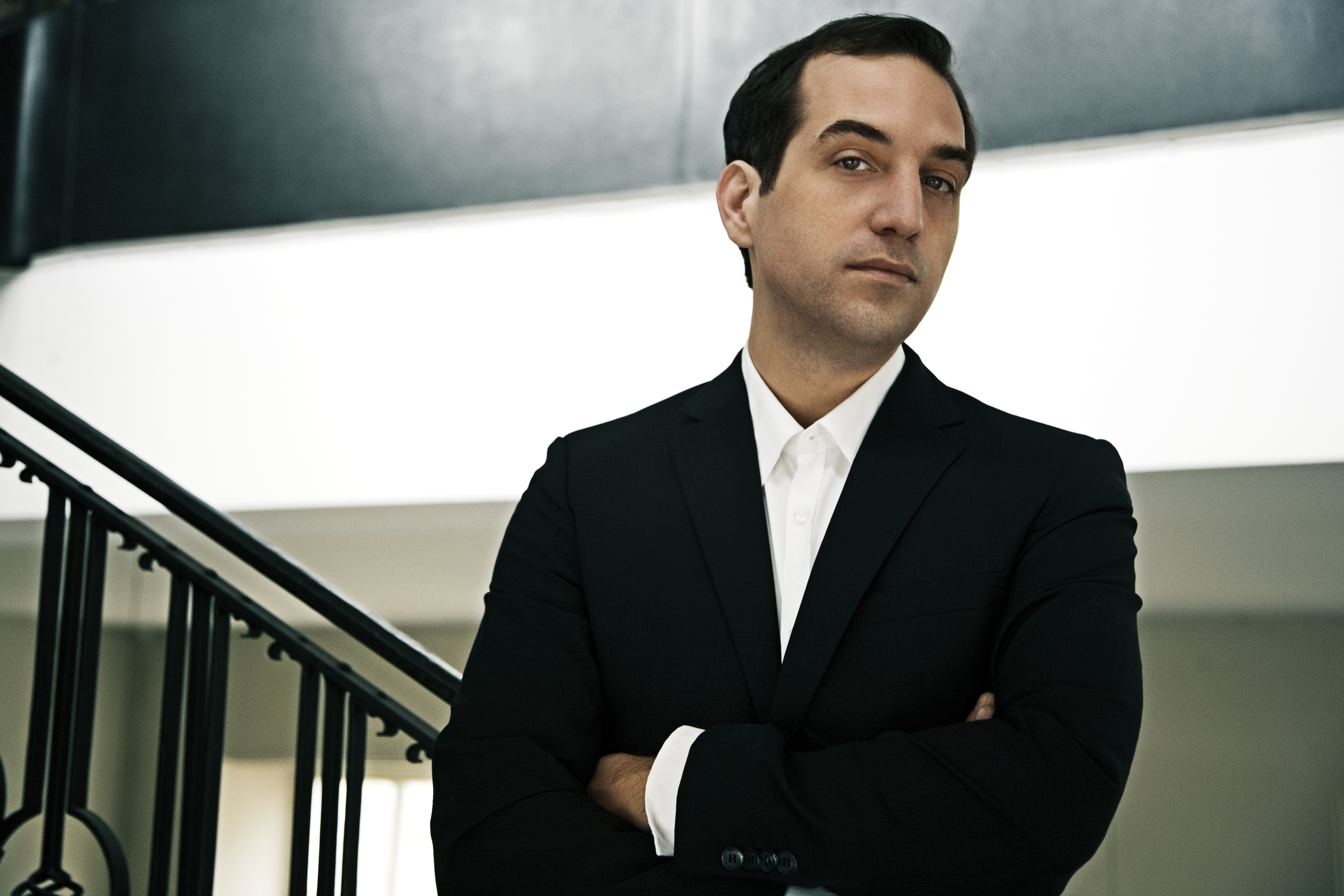
- Marc Houle

Background information
- Born: 1972 (age 53–54); Windsor, Ontario, Canada
- Genres: Techno, new wave, minimal
- Occupations: Live act, music producer
- Labels: Items & Things

Marc Houle (born 1972 in Windsor, Ontario) is a Canadian live act and producer of electronic music. He is considered a live act and not a DJ, since he uses elements of his own productions to create his sets, as well as tracks that he has remixed. Houle came to fame under his first album, Bay of Figs, which was released on Minus. He is most known for being a techno artist, and as part of the core group of artists on Minus before moving on to create his own record label Items & Things with fellow Minus friends, Magda and Troy Pierce.

Houle was largely inspired by the Detroit techno and Chicago house scene as well as new wave music, and the first generation of video games that championed electronic sounds. He often describes his sound as a cross between the two cities, Chicago and Detroit. His sound can be described as a blend of his Chicago and Detroit influences with a good measure of new wave synth sounds. Propelling sounds of the future yet at the same time casting a reminiscent light on 80's synths and video game music, Houle's productions give him a sound that sets him apart in the electronic music industry.

== Biography ==
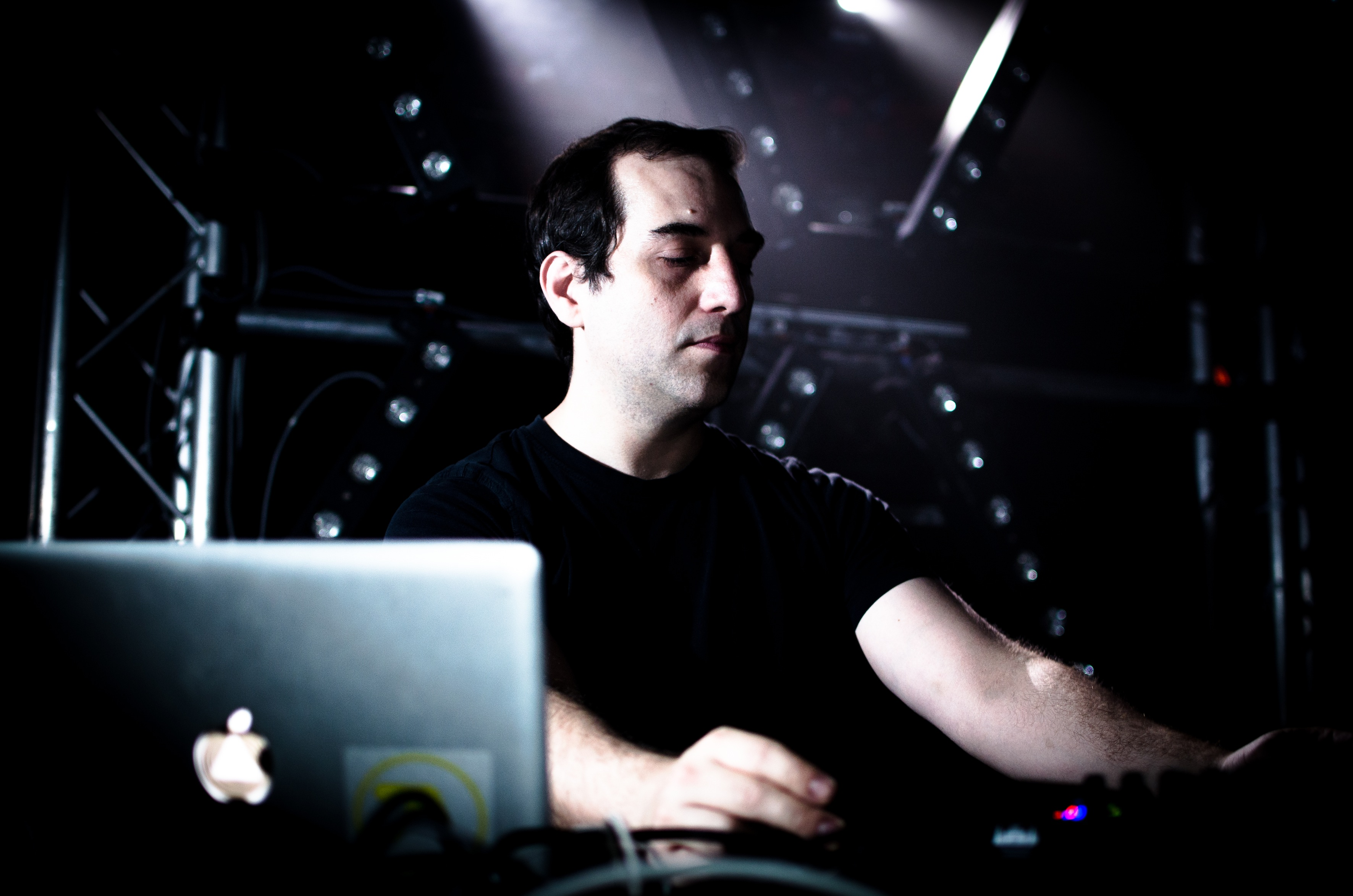
Marc Houle official press photo

Houle was born and raised in Windsor, Ontario, Canada. Growing up in a musical family, he started early to play around with musical instruments such as piano and guitar, and owned his first set of drums at the age of four. At the age of fourteen, he began exploring synths with his first Casio keyboard, on which he would eventually record on. For ten years, Houle was the drummer of a local Canadian rock band with regular small gigs in nightclubs all over Ontario. In 1991, he bought his first Roland JX-3P.

Being attracted by the new sounds of electronic music, Houle would often head into nearby Detroit to experience the famous warehouse parties, where a range of DJs would play a mix of Chicago house and Detroit techno. Around 1997, Houle and his friend Scott Souilliere ran the gaming night, "Atari Adventures" at Richie Hawtin’s club, 13 Below in Windsor. He met Magda, who was another fellow resident at the club. They became friends, going to the same shows between Windsor and Detroit. At the time, Magda started to tour with Richie Hawtin as opening act, and played stripped down edits of Houle’s tracks. Afterwards, Hawtin invited him to be on his Minus label. Living together in Windsor, Magda would guide Houle’s productions into being club friendly, while Houle would retain a separate synth version for himself.

Although Houle’s first EP wasn't released until 2004, he was constantly producing music at his home in Windsor. He would collect synths and new equipment to make music on from the pawn shops of Detroit. Houle enjoyed making new wave music that was a blend of electro, being a huge fan of the new wave synth lines. During that time, he also made video game music, for which his moniker "Run Stop Restore" was inspired by the key presses on a Commodore 64.

== Career ==
=== Beginnings ===
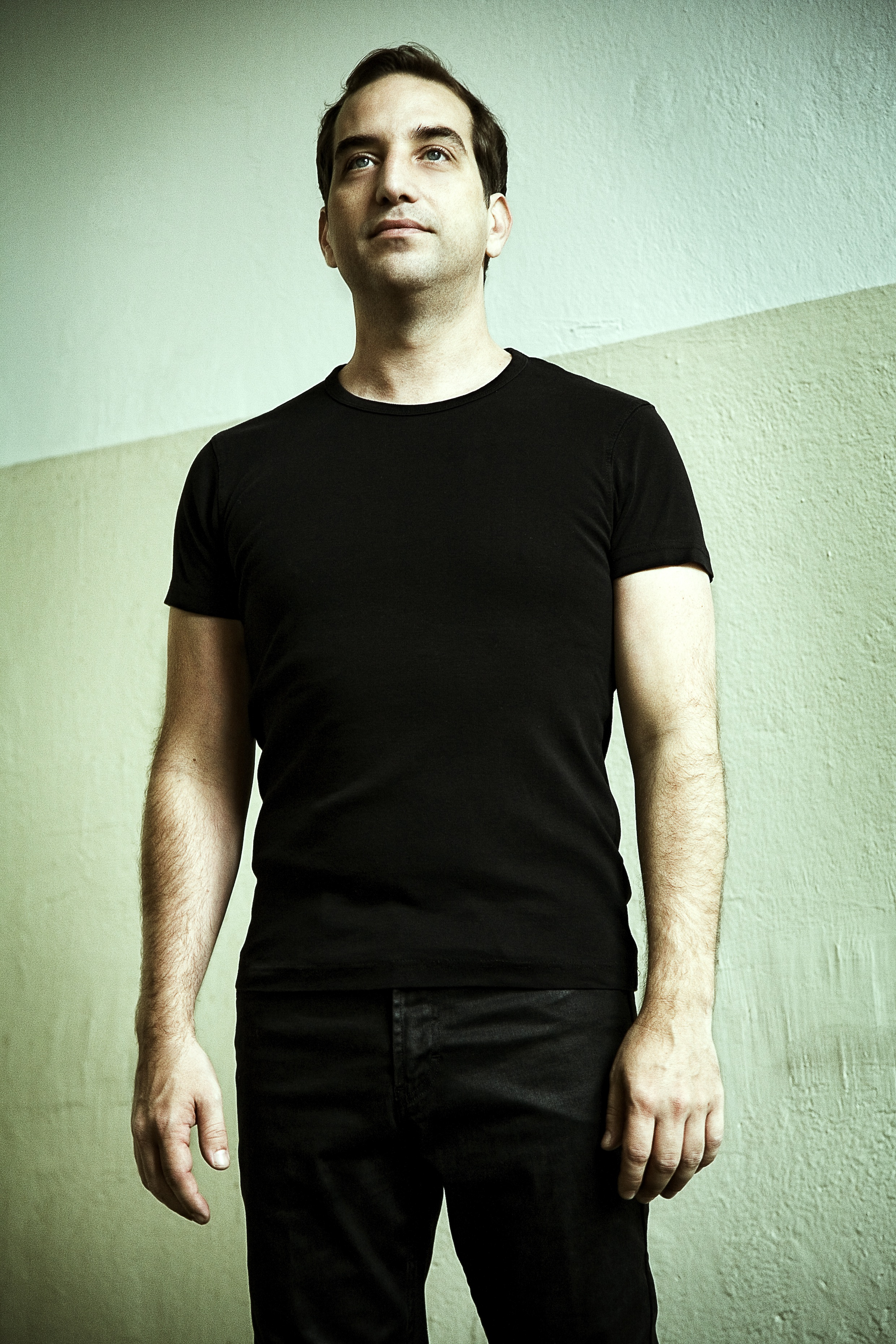
Marc Houle official press photo

Houle began his career as a graphic designer, quitting university in 1992 to focus on his own company called "Outputs", one of the first web design companies at the time. His next company, Redchalk, did work for the automotive industry located in the nearby area of Detroit, ranging from graphics and animation work to even music production. Both of Houle's brothers are also graphic designers to this date; Dave Houle carried on to be the designer for Minus for many years. Until today, Marc Houle still does a lot of photography and his own video graphics.

During his residency at Richie Hawtin's club 13 Below in Windsor (ON), Houle would "DJ" Electro and new wave music in the sense of radio DJing. Magda and Houle then became friends while playing at 13 Below. She became interested in Houle's productions and would eventually play Houle's tracks in her DJ sets. Richie Hawtin, having heard them, inquired as to their producer. At this point in time, Hawtin was beginning his work on his second label, Minus. Soon after, Houle's tracks were released on Minus and he became a part of the team.

=== Minus ===
After putting out his first record, Restore, on Minus in 2004, Houle began touring as a live act. One of his first performances was in Detroit, followed by a performance at the club "Happy Ending" in New York City alongside Mike Servito on Saturday, August 28, 2004.

In April - May 2006, Houle participated in the vigorous 50 date "min2MAX tour" to celebrate the Minus "min2MAX" compilation of minimal techno. Houle's track, "Simpler" is part of the compilation. The tour began with 25 dates throughout the European continent, of which Houle played six shows, one of them headlining himself in Belgrade, Serbia. The tour then continued in May in North America as a bus tour across 11 cities in the US and Canada. For the US segment, Houle travelled together with Magda, Troy Pierce, and Richie Hawtin for all dates.

Two years later, in 2008, Houle decided to move to Berlin to continue working on his music and touring with his live performance. Houle was part of the CONTAKT tour, which celebrated the tenth anniversary of the Minus label. It featured six Minus artists: Richie Hawtin, Magda, Troy Pierce, Marc Houle, Heartthrob, and Gaiser. The tour was visionary in the sense that multiple artists would play at the same time, hooked up to a master mixer and paired along with stunning graphic and lights. Houle was one of the featured live acts.

During his time at Minus, Marc Houle was one of the primary designers on the LIVID CNTRL:R called Monome, working alongside other Minus artists and Livid. The Minus CNTRL:R that was later released after Houle had left the label, was a modification of original design Houle had designed, except with fewer buttons.

=== Items & Things ===
Items & Things began in 2006 as a sub-label under Minus, with only one release per year between 2006 and 2009. In summer of 2011, Houle along with Magda and Troy Pierce, decided to amicably break off from Hawtin's Minus label in order to pursue their own musical direction with Items & Things. The label is characterized by a variety of sounds ranging from disco to techno, with about one release per month featuring the label artists and newcomers. Having a steady output of studio productions himself as well as many unreleased tracks on his hard drive, Items & Things allows Houle to release more of the music he makes. The year of 2012 has seen Items & Things’ first full album: the release of Houle's latest album, "Undercover". There was also an EP release for "Undercover" with several remixes and an additional track, "Triple E." He has also contributed the track "Villains on the Dance Floor" for the label's first compilation and vinyl box set "Variables." In May 2013, Marc Houle and French DJ/producer Miss Kittin released their well received Where Is Kittin EP, with remixes from Dubfire and John Foxx and the Maths. Later in the year, on September 20, Houle released a five-track EP called Razzamatazz with fellow producer Click Box. Both EP releases were housed on Items & Things. Self-sufficient, the label has its own booking agency in addition to their label events called "Down & Out," to celebrate their label and feature their artists. The parties are characterized by a more "underground" feel, dark moods, simple lighting and special decoration. The agency's roster now features Houle, Magda, and Pierce as well as artists Nyma, Madato, Click Box, Bruno Pronsato, Danny Benedettini, Kate Simko, and Chloé.

=== Marc Houle Remiix App ===
In addition to the release of Houle's Undercover album in spring of 2012, he also released a Remiix app developed by the online music and technology company, Liine. Liine, whose offices are located at Minus headquarters in Berlin, has developed prior Remiix apps for artists such as Dubfire, Joris Voorn, Plastikman, and Oliver Huntemann. Houle has worked with the Liine app developers contributing tracks for the Minus Remiix App and later for his own. The Marc Houle Remiix app allows the user to take loops or parts of Houle's tracks, and rearrange them with the option of adding effects such as reverb or delay. The user then has the option to export their remix to their social media of choice. The app features tracks of Houle's both old and new, such as: "Bay of Figs," "Edamame," "On It," "Porch," Triple E," "Mooder," and "Undercover." The Marc Houle Remiix app can be purchased in the iTunes App store. In February 2013, there is an updated planned, with new artwork as well as 28 basslines and 32 drum loops.

=== Production ===
Heavy into analog synths for production, Houle has mentioned he uses the following top five favorites: Juno-60 for basslines and pads, Korg Mono/Poly for leads, ARP 2600 for synths, SH-101 for synths, and the DX7 for different synth sounds as well. In his musical production, he tends to "round off midrange," saying that his musical influences tended to not have midrange in their work as well. Houle also has mentioned that he sees music as an experiment for "conceptual question."

=== Other projects ===
Houle was also involved in a few side projects of his own. One of them, "2VM", was a short project where he teamed up with Veronica Vasicka. Together they produced one release called "Placita" (7"). His other project, Raid Over Moscow, was more of a band with musical influences of the late seventies/early eighties. Their release, "Rush to the Capsule" was released on Turbo Recordings.

In 2013, Houle teamed up with Joaquim dos Santos, with whom he has been friends since they both lived in Windsor, to create "La Folie," a nocturnal synth pop band. The name derives from the French phrase that means "the madness of love when one is madly in love." Joined by live member Clelia Cantoro, their debut performance was on June 5, 2013 at the Kantine at Berghain, one of Berlin's renowned nightclubs, which was soon followed by their debut album with twelve tracks mixed down by Tobi Neumann.

== Discography ==
=== Albums ===
- 2017: Sinister Mind
- 2015: Restored MINUSMIN35
- 2014: Cola Party IT030
- 2012: Undercover IT012
- 2010: Drift MINUS98
- 2008: Sixty-Four MINUS64
- 2006: Bay of Figs MINUS42
- 2004: Restore MINUS23

=== EPs ===
- 2016: Silver Siding EP IV66
- 2014: Fusion Pop EP IT029
- 2013: Razzamatazz EP IT025
- 2013: Where is Kittin? EP IT022
- 2012: Zorba EP WYS!015
- 2012: Undercover Single IT011
- 2009: Salamandarin MINUS88
- 2009: Licking Skin MINUS78
- 2007: Techno Vocals MINUS50

=== Remixes ===
- 2015: Words Gone Popof HOTC060
- 2015: Obsessed M.A.N.D.Y. GPM263
- 2014: Zipp Krankbrother NA006
- 2014: Shame Cube Sian OCT62
- 2014:Pulse Train Nicolas Bougaïeff TRAPEZ155
- 2014: Exit Strategy Arthur Oskan RTCOMP429
- 2014: The Butcher Battant 64784
- 2013: Isolation Vosper MEANT017
- 2013: Dream City Tunnel Signs HAKT006
- 2013: Caminho De Dreyfus Red Axes feat. Abrão Correspondent16
- 2013: Kybernetik Nyma IT020
- 2012: Brickwall Alexis Raphael (Jackathon) HPJJ002
- 2012: Computrfnk Vector Lovers Soma355D
- 2012: Erma Remain & Electric Rescue IDEAL22
- 2012: Very Bad Marc Houle IT015
- 2011: All I can Think About App WYS008
- 2011: Michael Jackson Phil Kieran & Green Velvet PKRD009
- 2011: Headcase Plastikman MINUS100
- 2011: The Night Terence Fixmer TURBO105
- 2009: The Butcher Battant, Butcher, Bruise KTDJ016
- 2008: Subtil Midimiliz SONICULTURE009
- 2008: I Am Alloy Mental SKINT145D
- 2008: Modern Walk Gesaffelstein GL31
- 2007: Nimrod Matt Tolfrey LEFTCD001
- 2007: Ardorant Tractile MINUSPROMO
- 2006: Asteroid Compound Louderbach UND/009
- 2006: 150 Reasons To Bite You Jorge Savoretti ESPERANZA003
- 2006: Turbo Dreams Ellen Allien & Apparat BPC124
- 2006: 25 Bitches Troy Pierce MINUS39
- 2005: Strawberry Dream Imiafan 4MG1201
- 2005: Kill The Pain Slam feat. Dot Allison SOMA180
- 2005: Sequential Circus Actual Jakshun MINUS27

=== Contributed ===
- 2012: Villain Of The Dance Floor Variables Compilation IT016
- 2011: Slowpe Down & Out Vol. 1 IT07
- 2009: Helen In The Keller Helen In The Keller EP MINUS80
- 2007: Porch Expansion | Contraction MINUS58
- 2007: A-Sides For Life Kontakt [3] | Min2MAX Tour MINUS:K3
- 2007: Extreme Spies & Lies IT02
- 2006: Turtle Feet Kontakt [2] | RTW KONTAKTRTW
- 2006: Simpler min2MAX MINUS40
- 2006: Kicker Spaceships And Pings IT01
- 2005: Ranchor Keeper DE9 | Transitions MINUS32
- 2005: East To West Minimize To Maximize MINUS25
- 2004: Geometry Geometry EP MINUS20
