= Winter Music Conference =

Annual electronic music conference

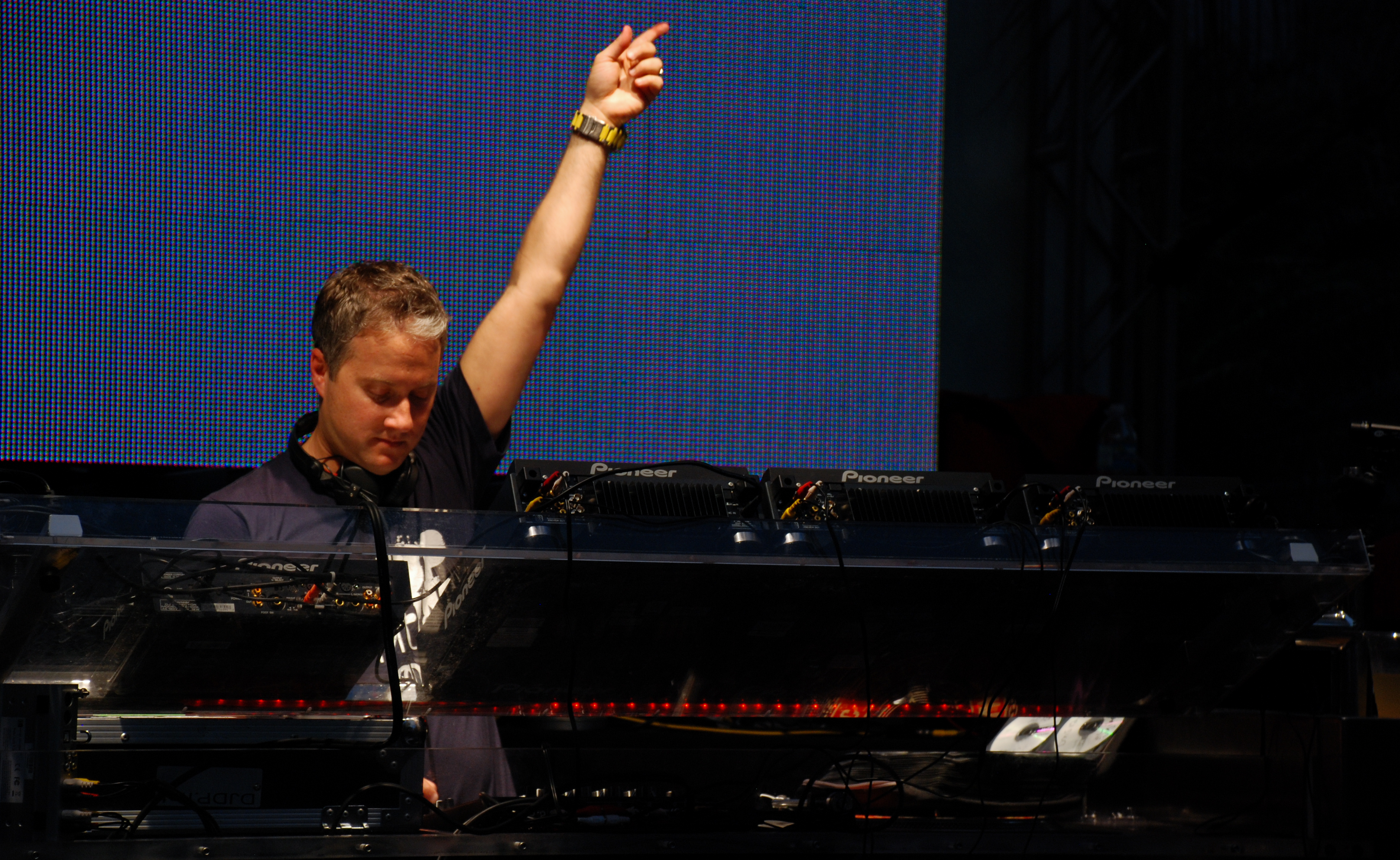
- Genre: Electronic music
- Dates: First three days of Miami Music Week (Last full week of March)
- Locations: Miami Beach, Florida, United States
- Years active: 1985–present
- Founders: Louis Possenti; Bill Kelly
- Website: www.wintermusicconference.com

The Winter Music Conference (WMC) is a week-long electronic music conference, held every March in Miami Beach, Florida, United States, since 1985. It is also known as the premiere platform for electronic dance music. The conference brings together professionals such as artists, DJs, record label representatives (A&R), producers, promoters, radio and the media for seminars and panel discussions. Each year, the WMC draws thousands of attendees from around the world.

== History and background ==
The Winter Music Conference was founded in 1985 by Louis Possenti and Bill Kelly. Held annually in Miami Beach, Florida, the Winter Music Conference, has hosted up to an estimated 100,000 people. The first Winter Music Conference took place at the Fort Lauderdale Marriott during 19–21 February 1986. There were approximately 80 dance music industry insiders in attendance. Since its inception in 1986, the event festivities have moved down south, across Miami Beach and Downtown Miami.

The event commands a major international draw with around 38 percent of attendees coming from outside the United States. The conference serves as a platform for many underground and indie artists from over 70 countries who spend the conference at events and panels; it is also a medium used by several entrepreneurs and consumer electronic companies to present their businesses and technological developments.

The WMC & The Recording Academy began in 1996 - a partnership presenting The Producers Forum, a gathering of legendary artists. In 1999, Ultra Beach Music Festival, now known as Ultra Music Festival, became an event as part of Winter Music Conference, taking place on 13 March 1999. Waxpoetics Magazine, JBL, and Stanton sponsored the first International Record Collectors Show in 2007. The WMC 2009 introduced the first annual WMC VJ Challenge at The Miami Beach Resort & Spa with celebrity hosts, judges, and VJs from various parts of the world hosted by VJ Psyberpixie and Felix Sama. This inaugural year of the competition resulted in Sergey Lobodln (Moscow, Russia), walking away with the top winner prize.

Since 2008, the conference has received increasing competition from the International Music Summit taking place in Ibiza in May.

In 2010, the VJ Challenge was expanded into two areas of competition; Video Mixing and Audio/Visual Mixing. The 2010 VJ Challenge winners were AeonChild (Boulder, Colorado) in the video category and Eclectic Method (London/NYC) in the Audio/Visual category. The Miami Beach Resort also received the performance of the RoboMusic Demo in which Funkstar De Luxe and RoboProfessor (Henrik Hautop Lund) create live interactive compositions of RoboMusic.

In 2011, for the first time, WMC and Ultra Music Festival split and took place during two completely separate weekends in March. This was "a gross inconsideration by the WMC for event planners worldwide and artist scheduling." according to Windish Agency booking agent Steve Goodgold. 2014 was the last year that WMC lasted a total of ten days. In 2015, WMC took place across the span of five days. Following that, 2016 was the second time that Winter Music Conference took place apart from Ultra Music Festival, lasting only four days, 21–24 March. Since then, other music conferences have come about including SXSW in Austin, Amsterdam Dance Event (ADE), and EDMbiz in Las Vegas, which takes place during Electric Daisy Carnival yearly.

On March 21, 2018, Ultra announced that it had acquired the WMC and the IDMAs.

On March 9, 2020, it was announced that the 35th edition of the WMC, originally scheduled for March 16–19, would be rescheduled due to the Florida Governor's declaration of a public health emergency and the Centers of Disease Control and Prevention's Interim Guidance regarding the COVID-19 pandemic.

== Events ==
There are over 500 individual events during the week the conference takes place. In 2007, The New York Times named it "one of the most anticipated clubbing events in the country."

- WMC Seminars & Panels
- The International Record Collectors Show (since 2007)
- South Beach Sessions (since 2008)
- The Producers Forum (since 1996)
- WMC Demo Listening Workshops
- WMC/DMC DJ Spin-off
- WMC On-Site Featured Events
- WMC Exhibits
- WMC Official and Sanctioned Events
- WMC Sample Sack
- The Guide
- The List
- Exhibit Hall
- WMC technology demonstrations
- WMC VJ Challenge (since 2009)

== International Dance Music Awards ==
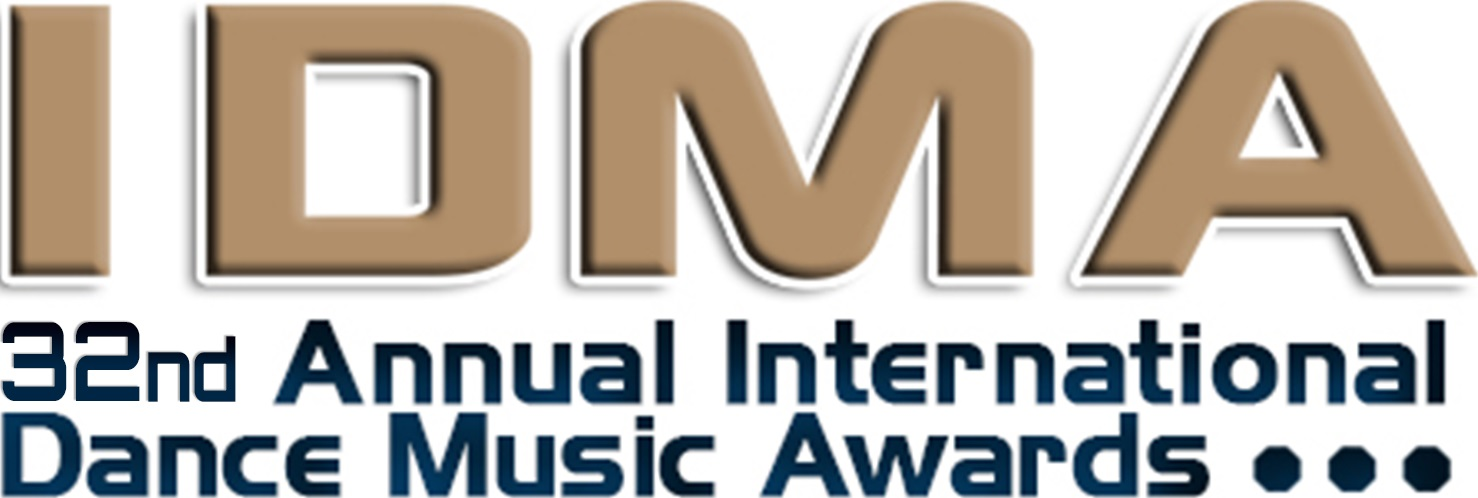
Logo for the 32nd Annual International Dance Music Awards held in 2018, recognising work in 2017

A major event during Winter Music Conference is the International Dance Music Awards (IDMAs). The IDMAs are an integral part of WMC generating over two million votes from music enthusiasts in 209 countries and territories every year to recognize and honor exceptional achievements in 57 award categories.

The IDMAs have been held annually since the founding of the WMC in 1985, except for 2017. In 2018 they were held once again but winners were chosen by the WMC without public voting. 2019, marked the first public vote for the IDMAs since the WMC was bought out by Miami Music Week - the organisers of Ultra Music Festival.

== See also ==
- List of electronic music festivals
