= Justin Martin (DJ) =

American DJ (born 1979)

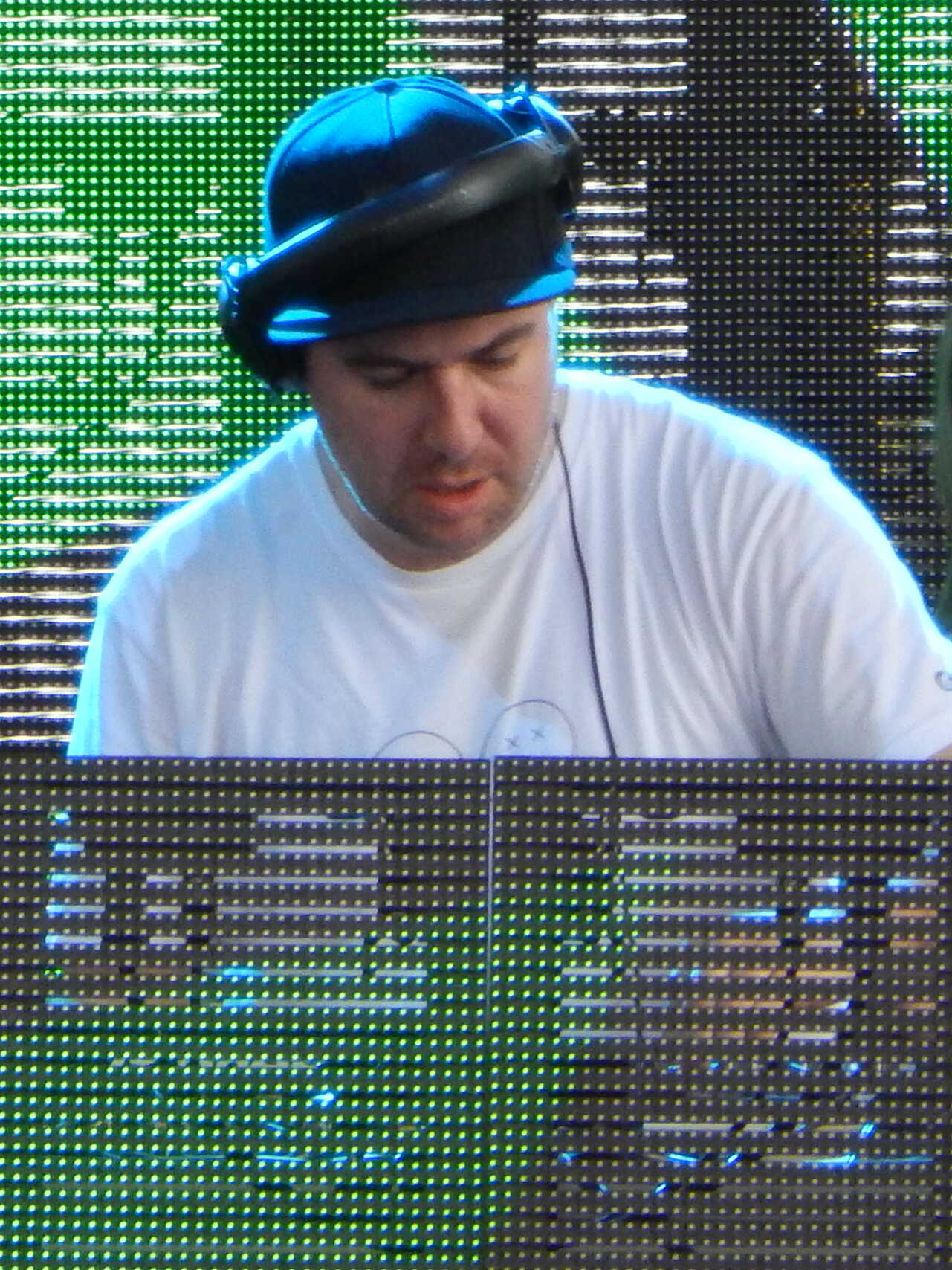
- Martin at the 2015 Spring Awakening Music Festival

Background information
- Born: April 20, 1979 (age 46)
- Origin: San Francisco, California, United States
- Occupations: DJ; record producer
- Labels: Dirtybird, It's Good

Justin Martin (born April 20, 1979) is an American DJ and record producer, based in San Francisco.

== Career ==
The first release on Dirtybird was The Southern Draw EP by Justin Martin and Sammy D.

Martin released his sophomore album on April 20, 2016, via Dirtybird Records.

In 2020, Martin launched his own label, What To Do…, with the single “Needs.”

== Discography ==
=== Charted albums ===
| Title | Details | Peak chart positions |
| Title | Details | US Dance |
|---|---|---|
| Hello Clouds | Released: April 20, 2016; Label: Dirtybird; Format: Digital download, CD | 15 |
