= Layo & Bushwacka! =

British DJ duo

- Origin: London, England
- Genre: Tech house
- Years active: 1998 - present
- Labels: Olmeto Records, End Recordings
- Members: Layo Paskin; Matthew Benjamin (aka Bean Monster)

Layo & Bushwacka! is a British DJ duo made up of Layo Paskin and Matthew Benjamin, who released four tech house albums between 1998 and 2012.

== Layo Paskin ==
Paskin, from London, began his DJ career at the age of sixteen while working at Camden Market. Not long after, he began DJing at warehouse parties with Mr. C. In the course of his work, Paskin's father discovered the building that would become The End, a 19th-century stable for mail horses.

Along with Mr. C, Paskin was the co-owner of The End nightclub in London. Labelled variously as tech house, house or breakbeat, the pair usually record and DJ together. Paskin's father is an architect and designed the club.

== Matthew Benjamin ==
Benjamin's best known track is his remix of Michael Jackson's "Billie Jean". He was raised in London and was a member of the London School Symphony Orchestra, playing percussion. After graduating in sound engineering he started working for Mr. C as he was setting up The End; Benjamin was the resident DJ there. It was at this point that he first met Paskin.

== Discography ==
=== Albums ===
- 1998: Low Life (End Recordings)
- 2002: Night Works (XL Recordings)
- 2003: All Night Long (End Recordings)
- 2006: Feels Closer (Olmeto Records)
- 2007: Global Underground 033: Rio (Global Underground Ltd.)
- 2012: Rising & Falling (Olmeto Records)

=== Singles ===
- 1999: "Deep South" (End Recordings)
- 1999: "Ear Candy" (End Recordings)
- 2002: "Love Story" (XL Recordings) (Billboard Hot Dance Club Play #4)
- 2003: "Love Story vs. Finally" (XL Recordings) (UK Singles Chart #8)
- 2003: "It's Up to You (Shining Through)" (UK #25) (XL Recordings)
- 2003: "Deep South"
- 2006: "Feels Closer" (Olmeto Records)
- 2006: "Life2Live" (Olmeto Records)
- 2008: "Things Change" (Olmeto Records)

=== Remixes ===
- 2001: Orbital – "Funny Break (One Is Enough) [Layo & Bushwacka! Mix]"
- 2001: Reprazent – "Lucky Pressure"
- 2001: Stanton Warriors – "The Phantom"
- 2002: Jakatta – "My Vision [Layo & Bushwacka! Vocal Mix]"
- 2002: Bebel Gilberto – "So Nice [Layo & Bushwacka! Mix]"
- 2002: Paul Oakenfold – "Ready Steady Go [Layo & Bushwacka! Remix]"
- 2003: Finley Quaye & William Orbit – "Dice [Layo & Bushwacka! Missing You Mix]"
- 2003: Ella Fitzgerald – "Angel Eyes [Layo & Bushwacka! Mix]"
- 2003: Depeche Mode – "Dream On [Bushwacka! Mix]"
