= Tech house =

Subgenre of house music

- Stylistic origins: House; techno; minimal techno; deep house
- Cultural origins: Post-1986, UK and United States (mainly Detroit, Chicago and Ibiza, Spain)

Subgenres
- Desert house; Deep tech

Fusion genres
- Gqom tech; hardcore techno; electro house; trance

Other topics
- Microhouse

Tech house is a house music subgenre that prominently incorporates stylistic features from techno. The term tech house developed as a shorthand record store name for a category of electronic dance music that combined musical aspects of techno, such as "rugged basslines" and "steely beats", with the harmonies and grooves of progressive house. Tech house originally featured the clean and minimal production style associated with techno from Detroit and the UK.

In the mid to late 1990s, a tech house scene developed in England around club nights such as The Drop run by the former Shamen rapper Mr C (Richard West) & Paul "Rip" Stone (co-founder with West of Plink Plonk), Heart & Soul and Wiggle run by Terry Francis and Nathan Coles. Other DJs and artists associated with the sound at that time included Charles Webster, Pure Science, Omid 16B, Bushwacka!, Cuartero, Dave Angel, Herbert, Terry Lee Brown Jr., Funk D'Void, Ian O'Brien, Derrick Carter and Stacey Pullen. By the late 1990s, London nightclub The End, owned by Mr C and Layo Paskin, was considered the home of tech house in the UK. On the other side of the Atlantic Ocean, one of the earliest innovators in the genre was Lucas Rodenbush, (E.B.E), who was releasing records on the West Coast of the United States from 1995 onwards.

== Characteristics ==
As a mixing style, tech-house often brings together deep or minimal techno music, the soulful and jazzy end of house, some minimal and very often some dub elements. There is some overlap with progressive house, which too can contain deep, soulful, dub and techno elements; this is especially true since the turn of the millennium, as progressive-house mixes have themselves often become deeper and sometimes more minimal. However, the typical progressive-house mix has more energy than tech-house, which tends to have a more "laid-back" feel. Tech house fans tend to appreciate subtlety, as well as the "middle ground" that adds a "splash of color to steel techno beats" and eschews the "banging" of house music for intricate rhythms.

=== Musical structure ===
As a musical (as opposed to a mixing) style, tech-house uses the same basic structure as house. However, elements of the house 'sound' such as realistic jazz sounds (in deep house) and booming kick drums are replaced with elements from techno such as shorter, deeper, darker and often distorted kicks, smaller, quicker hi-hats, noisier snares and more synthetic or acid sounding synth melodies from the TB-303, including raw electronic noises from distorted sawtooth and square wave oscillators.

Some producers also add soulful vocals and elements (David Chambers), and equally as much raw electronic sounds in their music. However, a rich techno-like kick and bassline seems to be a consistency amongst tech house music.

== History ==
Since the early 2000s, tech house has spread in Europe. Although it has long remained in the shadow of techno music (propelled by artists such as Adam Beyer or Richie Hawtin in northern Europe such as Germany, the Netherlands and Sweden), tech house has a huge success in Spain. Indeed, thanks to the expansion of new DJs such as Marc Maya, Oscar Aguilera or Raul Mezcolanza (all resident DJs of a box in Barcelona: the ROW14), tech house can compete with other styles of electro festivals like the Monegros Desert Festival or the Awakenings Festival. However, the highlight of tech house is also due to the promotion of this style of music by other DJs such as Carl Cox or Joris Voorn.

=== Modern resurgence ===
Tech house has become a highly popular form of dance music. As of September 2018, the Beatport top 100 is filled with tracks by artists like Green Velvet, Hot Since 82, Fisher, Solardo, MDNTMVMT, Bedouin, Patrick Topping, and Jamie Jones, all of whom incorporate elements of tech house into their work. This resurgence in tech house can be ascribed to the recent surge in popularity of analog synth sounds, as well as the popularization of tech house artists in the United States, through labels like Dirtybird and the booking of multiple tech house DJs at festivals like Coachella and CRSSD.

Fisher's 2018 track 'Losing It' is considered one of the first tech house tracks to break into mainstream popularity, as well as being credited as a major milestone in establishing the tech house sound within the realm of electronic dance music. In subsequent years, other tech house artists were able to achieve similar or even greater mainstream success, including Acraze with his 2021 track 'Do It To It', or Meduza with their 2019 tracks 'Piece Of Your Heart' & 'Lose Control'.

== See also ==
- Styles of house music
