= Dämmerung =

Dämmerung may refer to:

- die Dämmerung, the German word for twilight
- Dämmerung, 1893 play by Elsa Bernstein
- Dämmerung, 1978 drama by Gerhard Roth
- Dämmerung, 2006 album by German singer/songwriter Franz Josef Degenhardt
- Dämmerung, 2010 album by Turkish rapper Massaka
- "Dämmerung", song by the German folk metal band Equilibrium
- "Dämmerung", song by the Australian band Frontside
- Dämmerung, Headquarters of Vector Industries in the video game Xenosaga
