= Noel Burgess =

Australian musician

Noel Burgess is an Australian electronic dance music producer.

Burgess formed Vision Four 5 whilst studying Music Technology at the Queensland Conservatorium of Music with fellow students Gavin Sade, Harry Ho and later Ben Suthers to perform live electronic dance music at night clubs. The popularity and uniqueness of the band attracted the attention of Tim Gruchy, a Brisbane-based video artist who was part of the Rat Parties team at the time. Vision Four 5 was quickly signed to Volition Records / Sony Music alongside stable mates Boxcar, Itch-E and Scratch-E, Severed Heads, Southend, Single Gun Theory. Vision Four 5 was active from 1990-1997.

During this time, Burgess also wrote, recorded and performed under the name of AapogeE with Ben Suthers and released through Candy Line Records (Melb, Aust) and Rabbit City Records (UK). Their most popular track was "The Force" (Come to the Darkside Mix). Burgess also collaborated with Boxcar's David Smith under the name of Gridlock and with Josh Abrahams as AapogeE vs The Pagan.

Following a stint in the UK, Burgess returned to work mainly as a producer, co-writing/producing Groove Terminator's debut Album Road Kill (EMI Records), co-writing/producing with Groove Terminator as Chili Hi Fly, co-producing/mixing the unreleased Infusion album "Everything Here is Good" for Sony Music, which later was reworked to become Phrases and Numbers on Thunk Records and solo releases/performances as "f.i.s.t" through Pacifica Records, of which he was a partner. Music from "f.i.s.t" was also released on vinyl by Sydney's Nine09 label, who described the song "AO (One Fist)" as "a powerful combination of minimal techno, and funk driven electronic energy".

Since 1999, Burgess has worked compiling/editing/mixing/mastering all the Ministry of Sound Australia compilations and "One Love"/Sony Music compilations. From 2000-2005 Noel was the Musical director for the Australian Dance Music Awards (DMA's) and Urban Music awards (UMA's). He later composed and produced the ABC children's series CJ the DJ for Kapow Pictures, a 52-episode musical cartoon about a 13-year-old girl DJ.

Burgess currently lives in the Blue Mountains (New South Wales) with his family.
