= ARIA Award for Best Dance Release =

Annual Australian music industry award

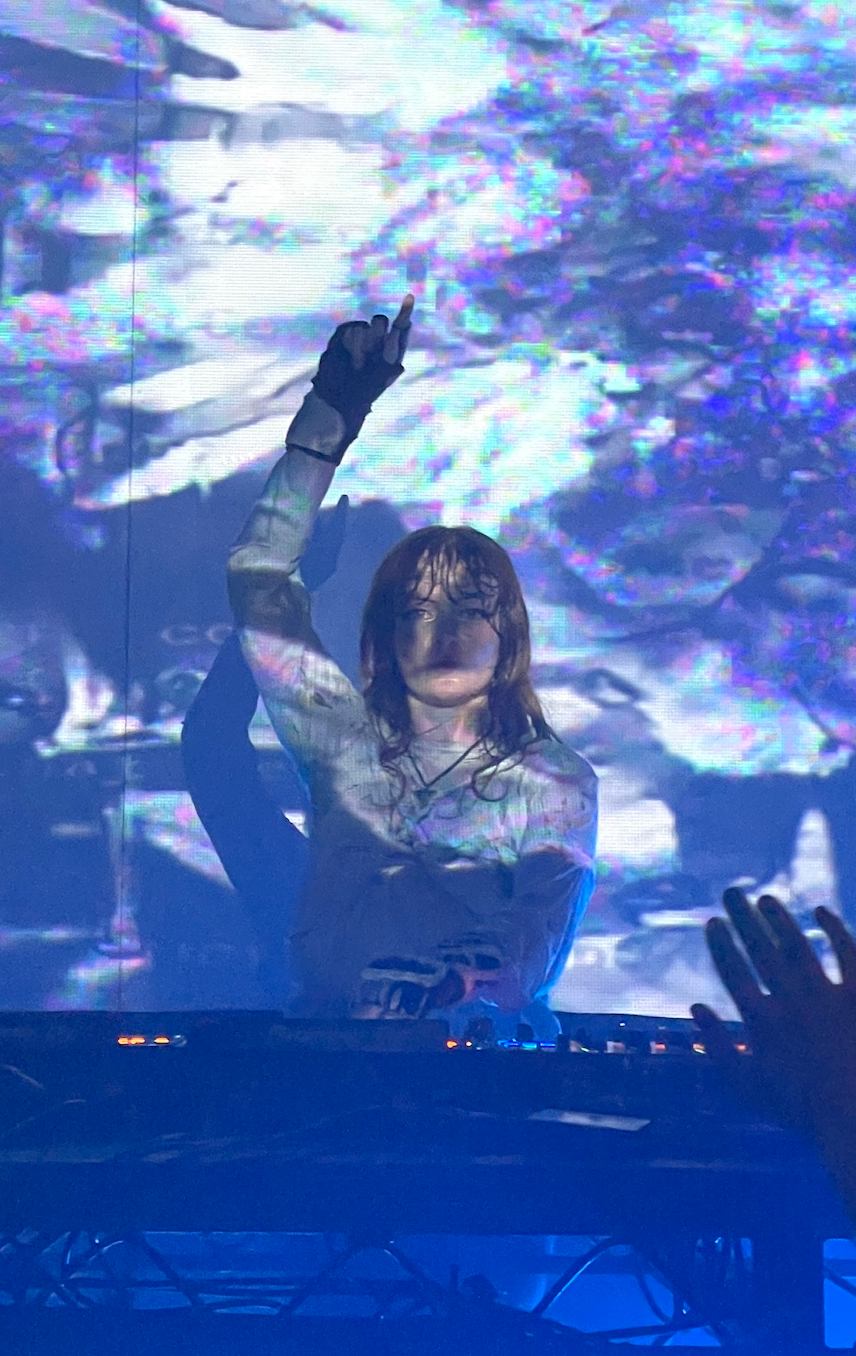
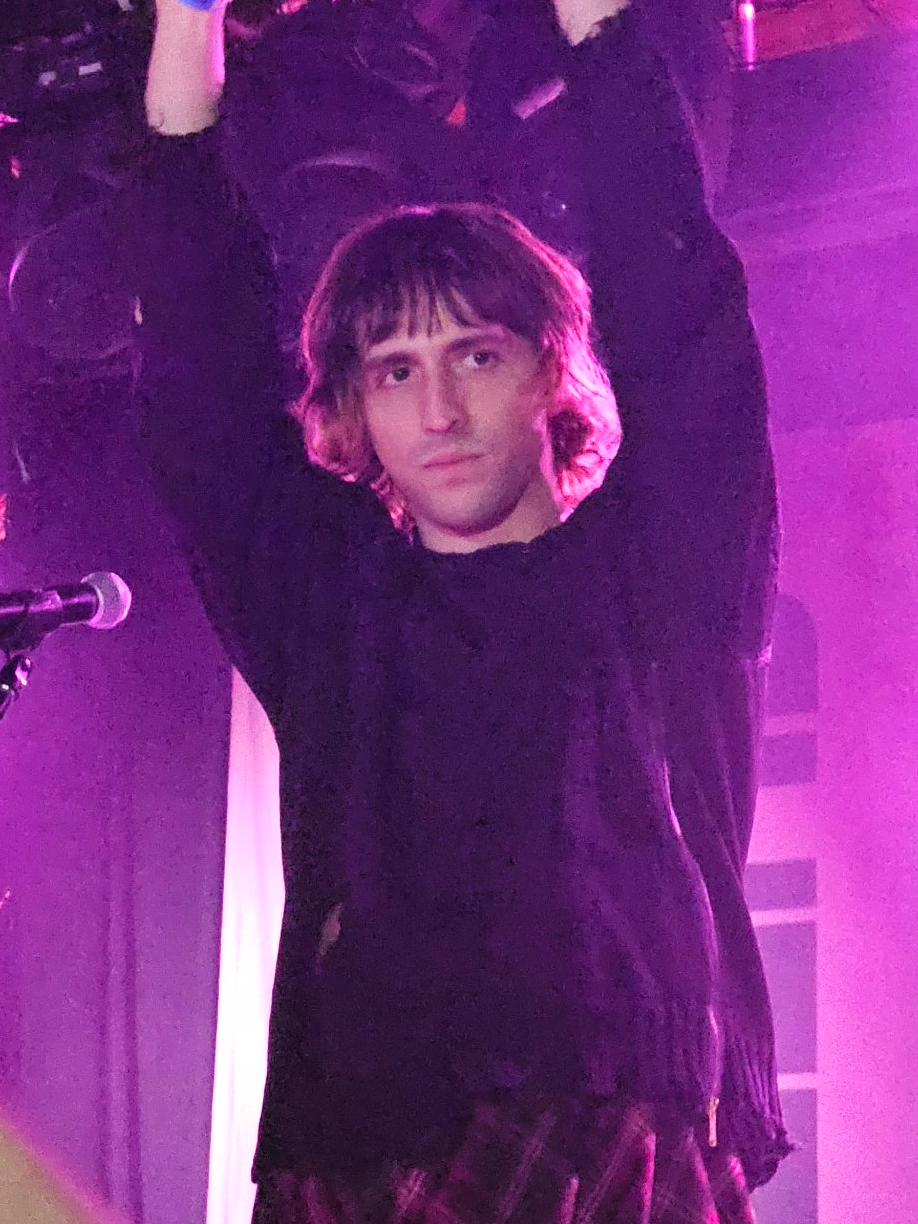
- 2026 winners Ninajirachi (left) and Porter Robinson (right)
- Country: Australia
- Presented by: Australian Recording Industry Association (ARIA)
- First award: 1995
- Currently held by: Ninajirachi and Porter Robinson, "WannaCry" (2026)

Highlights
- Most wins: Dom Dolla (4)
- Most nominations: Rüfüs Du Sol (9)
- Website: ariaawards.com.au

The ARIA Music Award for Best Dance Release, is an award presented at the annual ARIA Music Awards, which recognises "the many achievements of Aussie artists across all music genres", since 1987. It is handed out by the Australian Recording Industry Association (ARIA), an organisation whose aim is "to advance the interests of the Australian record industry." To be eligible, the recording (an album or single) must have been commercially released. The award is presented to an artist within the dance genre. The accolade is voted for by a judging school, which comprises between 40 and 100 members of representatives experienced in this genre, and is given to a solo artist, group, production team or various artist compilation, who is either from Australia or an Australian resident.

The award for Best Dance Release was first presented to Itch-E and Scratch-E in 1995 for their single, "Sweetness and Light". In the following year Future Sound of Melbourne won the award for their album Chapter One.

Dom Dolla has won the award the most times, with four wins. Rüfüs Du Sol has the most nominations with nine, while Fisher has the most nominations without a win with five. Four artists have won in consecutive years; Infusion in 2004 and 2005, the Presets in 2008 and 2009, Pnau in 2017 and 2018 and Dolla from 2023 to 2025, becoming the first artist to win in three consecutive years. Swedish singer Elliphant became the first non-Australian nominee as a featured artist on "Stranger" by Peking Duk in 2017, followed by Irish singer Jazzy and English DJ D.O.D. as co-lead artists on "Somedays" with Sonny Fodera in 2025 and American producer Porter Robinson as a co-lead artist on "WannaCry" with Ninajirachi in 2026; Robinson subsequently became the first non-Australian winner.

== Winners and nominees ==
In the following table, the winner is highlighted in a separate colour, and in boldface; the nominees are those that are not highlighted or in boldface.

Winner marked in a separate colour

Year	Winner(s)	Album/single title
**1995** (9th)
**1995** (9th)	**Itch-E and Scratch-E**	"**Sweetness and Light**"
**1995** (9th)	Boxcar	"What Are You So Happy About"
**1995** (9th)	Quench	"Dreams"
**1995** (9th)	Renegade Funktrain	"I Wonder"
**1995** (9th)	The Rockmelons	"Stronger Together"
**1995** (9th)	Single Gun Theory	Flow, River Of My Soul
**1996** (10th)
**1996** (10th)	**Future Sound of Melbourne**	**Chapter One**
**1996** (10th)	DJ Darren Briais vs DJ Pee Wee Ferris	"I Feel It"
**1996** (10th)	Infusion	Smoke Screen
**1996** (10th)	Itch-E and Scratch-E	"Howling Dog"
**1996** (10th)	Renegade Funktrain	Renegade Funktrain
**1997** (11th)
**1997** (11th)	**Pendulum**	**"Coma"**
**1997** (11th)	Boo Boo and Mace!	"Flowers in the Sky"
**1997** (11th)	The Lord's Garden	Journey
**1997** (11th)	Our House	Floorspace
**1997** (11th)	Wicked Beat Sound System	Music from the Core
**1998** (12th)
**1998** (12th)	**Sgt Slick**	**"White Treble, Black Bass"**
**1998** (12th)	Endorphin	Embrace
**1998** (12th)	Friendly	Hello Bellybutton
**1998** (12th)	Frontside	"Dammerung" / "Mind Distortion"
**1998** (12th)	Peewee Ferris	Social Narcotic
**1999** (13th)
**1999** (13th)	**Josh G Abrahams**	**Sweet Distorted Holiday**
**1999** (13th)	B(if)tek	"Bedrock"
**1999** (13th)	Fatt Dex	"Jus' Funkin'"
**1999** (13th)	Honeysmack	Walk on Acid
**1999** (13th)	Sonic Animation	"Love Lies Bleeding"
**2000** (14th)
**2000** (14th)	**Pnau**	**Sambanova**
**2000** (14th)	Chili Hi Fly	Is it Love?
**2000** (14th)	Madison Avenue	"Don't Call Me Baby"
**2000** (14th)	Sonic Animation	Orchid for the Underworld
**2000** (14th)	Wicked Beat Sound System	Inna Styles
**2001** (15th)
**2001** (15th)	**The Avalanches**	**Since I Left You**
**2001** (15th)	Infusion	Phrases and Numbers
**2001** (15th)	Love Tattoo	Bass Has Got Me Movin'
**2001** (15th)	Paul Mac	"Just the Thing"
**2001** (15th)	Sgt Slick	"Let It Ride"
**2002** (16th)
**2002** (16th)	**Paul Mac**	**3000 Feet High**
**2002** (16th)	1200 Techniques	"Karma (What Goes Around)"
**2002** (16th)	Gerling	"Dust Me Selecta"
**2002** (16th)	Katalyst	Manipulating Agent
**2002** (16th)	Love Tattoo	Love Tattoo
**2003** (17th)
**2003** (17th)	**Rogue Traders**	**"One of My Kind"**
**2003** (17th)	1200 Techniques	"Eye of the Storm"
**2003** (17th)	Disco Montego	Disco Montego
**2003** (17th)	Gerling	"Who's Ya Daddy?"
**2003** (17th)	Wicked Beat Sound System	New Soul Breaks
**2004** (18th)
**2004** (18th)	**Infusion**	**"Girls Can Be Cruel"**
**2004** (18th)	Cam Farrar	"Wasted"
**2004** (18th)	NuBreed	The Original
**2004** (18th)	Cut Copy	"Future"
**2004** (18th)	Mr Timothy	"I Am Tha 1"
**2005** (19th)
**2005** (19th)	**Infusion**	**Six Feet Above Yesterday**
**2005** (19th)	Bodyrockers	"I Like the Way (You Move)"
**2005** (19th)	Deepface	"Been Good"
**2005** (19th)	Dirty South	"Sleazy"
**2005** (19th)	Rogue Traders	"Voodoo Child"
**2006** (20th)
**2006** (20th)	**TV Rock** featuring **Seany B**	**"Flaunt It"**
**2006** (20th)	Dirty South	Dirty South
**2006** (20th)	Paul Mac	Panic Room
**2006** (20th)	Sneaky Sound System	"I Love It"
**2006** (20th)	The Presets	Beams
**2007** (21st)
**2007** (21st)	**Sneaky Sound System**	**Sneaky Sound System**
**2007** (21st)	Gotye	Mixed Blood
**2007** (21st)	Hook N Sling and Kid Kenobi	"The Bump"
**2007** (21st)	poxyMusic	"She Bites"
**2007** (21st)	TV Rock versus Dukes of Windsor	"The Others"
**2008** (22nd)
**2008** (22nd)	**The Presets**	**Apocalypso**
**2008** (22nd)	Cut Copy	In Ghost Colours
**2008** (22nd)	Mobin Master	"Show Me Love"
**2008** (22nd)	Pnau	Pnau
**2008** (22nd)	The Potbelleez	"Don't Hold Back"
**2009** (23rd)
**2009** (23rd)	**The Presets**	**"Talk Like That"**
**2009** (23rd)	Hook N Sling	"The Best Thing"
**2009** (23rd)	Sneaky Sound System	2
**2009** (23rd)	Tommy Trash	"Need Me to Stay"
**2009** (23rd)	Zoë Badwi	"Release Me"
**2010** (24th)
**2010** (24th)	**Yolanda Be Cool** and **DCUP**	**"We No Speak Americano"**
**2010** (24th)	Art vs. Science	"Magic Fountain"
**2010** (24th)	Miami Horror	"Sometimes"
**2010** (24th)	Midnight Juggernauts	The Crystal Axis
**2010** (24th)	Pendulum	Immersion
**2011** (25th)
**2011** (25th)	**Cut Copy**	**Zonoscope**
**2011** (25th)	Bag Raiders	Bag Raiders
**2011** (25th)	Miami Horror	Illumination
**2011** (25th)	Pnau	Soft Universe
**2011** (25th)	The Potbelleez	From the Music
**2012** (26th)
**2012** (26th)	**Ivan Gough** and **Feenixpawl** featuring **Georgi Kay**	**"In My Mind"**
**2012** (26th)	Havana Brown	When the Lights Go Out
**2012** (26th)	Hermitude	HyperParadise
**2012** (26th)	Knife Party	"Rage Valley"
**2012** (26th)	Sneaky Sound System	From Here to Anywhere
**2013** (27th)
**2013** (27th)	**Flume**	**Flume**
**2013** (27th)	Jagwar Ma	Howlin'
**2013** (27th)	The Potbelleez	"Saved in a Bottle"
**2013** (27th)	The Presets	Pacifica
**2013** (27th)	Rüfüs Du Sol	Atlas
**2014** (28th)
**2014** (28th)	**Peking Duk featuring Nicole Millar**	**"High"**
**2014** (28th)	Flume and Chet Faker	"Drop the Game"
**2014** (28th)	Nicky Night Time	Everybody Together
**2014** (28th)	Rüfüs Du Sol	"Sundream"
**2014** (28th)	The Presets	"No Fun"
**2015** (29th)
**2015** (29th)	**Rüfüs Du Sol**	**"You Were Right"**
**2015** (29th)	Alison Wonderland	Run
**2015** (29th)	Flight Facilities	Down to Earth
**2015** (29th)	Hayden James	"Something About You"
**2015** (29th)	Peking Duk featuring Safia	"Take Me Over"
**2016** (30th)
**2016** (30th)	**Flume**	**Skin**
**2016** (30th)	Hayden James	"Just a Lover"
**2016** (30th)	L D R U featuring Paige IV	"Keeping Score"
**2016** (30th)	Rüfüs Du Sol	Bloom
**2016** (30th)	The Avalanches	Wildflower
**2017** (31st)
**2017** (31st)	**Pnau**	**"Chameleon"**
**2017** (31st)	Dom Dolla & Torren Foot	"Be Randy"
**2017** (31st)	Jagwar Ma	Every Now & Then
**2017** (31st)	Peking Duk featuring Elliphant	"Stranger"
**2017** (31st)	The Kite String Tangle	The Kite String Tangle
**2018** (32nd)
**2018** (32nd)	**Pnau**	**"Go Bang"**
**2018** (32nd)	Alison Wonderland	Awake
**2018** (32nd)	Fisher	"Losing It"
**2018** (32nd)	Peking Duk	"Fire"
**2018** (32nd)	Rüfüs Du Sol	"No Place"
**2019** (33rd)
**2019** (33rd)	**Rüfüs Du Sol**	**Solace**
**2019** (33rd)	Dom Dolla	"Take It"
**2019** (33rd)	Fisher	"You Little Beauty"
**2019** (33rd)	Peking Duk and Jack River	"Sugar"
**2019** (33rd)	Pnau	"Solid Gold"
**2020** (34th)
**2020** (34th)	**Dom Dolla**	**"San Frandisco"**
**2020** (34th)	Alice Ivy	Don't Sleep
**2020** (34th)	Flume featuring Vera Blue	"Rushing Back"
**2020** (34th)	Northeast Party House	"Shelf Life"
**2020** (34th)	Stace Cadet & KLP	"Energy"
**2021** (35th)
**2021** (35th)	**Rüfüs Du Sol**	**"Alive"**
**2021** (35th)	Cosmo's Midnight	Yesteryear
**2021** (35th)	Dom Dolla	"Pump the Brakes"
**2021** (35th)	Jolyon Petch	"Dreams"
**2021** (35th)	KLP & Stace Cadet	"People Happy"
**2022** (36th)
**2022** (36th)	**Luude**	**"Down Under" (featuring Colin Hay)**
**2022** (36th)	Confidence Man	Tilt
**2022** (36th)	Flume	Palaces
**2022** (36th)	Harvey Sutherland	Boy
**2022** (36th)	Rüfüs Du Sol	Surrender
**2023** (37th)
**2023** (37th)	**MK and Dom Dolla**	**"Rhyme Dust"**
**2023** (37th)	Fisher & Aatig	"Take It Off"
**2023** (37th)	Golden Features	Sisyphus
**2023** (37th)	Lastlings	Perfect World
**2023** (37th)	PNAU and Troye Sivan	"You Know What I Need"
**2024** (38th)
**2024** (38th)	**Dom Dolla**	**"Saving Up"**
**2024** (38th)	Confidence Man	"I Can't Lose You"
**2024** (38th)	Cyril	"Stumblin' In"
**2024** (38th)	Fisher featuring Kita Alexander	"Atmosphere"
**2024** (38th)	Rüfüs Du Sol	"Music is Better"
**2025** (39th)
**2025** (39th)	**Dom Dolla**	**"Dreamin'"**
**2025** (39th)	Confidence Man	3AM (La La La)
**2025** (39th)	Fisher	"Stay"
**2025** (39th)	Ninajirachi	I Love My Computer
**2025** (39th)	Sonny Fodera, Jazzy & D.O.D.	"Somedays"
**2026** (40th)
**2026** (40th)	**Ninajirachi and Porter Robinson**	**"WannaCry"**
**2026** (40th)	Dean Turnley	"Actin' Tough"
**2026** (40th)	Dom Dolla and Puretone	"Addicted to Bass"
**2026** (40th)	Tame Impala	"Afterthought"
**2026** (40th)	Yes Boone	"All I Really Want"

== Artists with multiple wins ==
4 wins

- Dom Dolla

3 wins

- Pnau
- Rüfüs Du Sol

2 wins

- Flume
- Ivan Gough (Note: Including one as a member of TV Rock.)
- Infusion
- Paul Mac (Note: Including one as a member of Itch-E and Scratch-E.)
- The Presets

== Artists with multiple nominations ==
9 nominations

- Rüfüs Du Sol

8 nominations

- Dom Dolla

7 nominations

- Pnau

6 nominations

- Paul Mac (Note: Including three as a member of Itch-E and Scratch-E.)

5 nominations

- Fisher
- Flume
- Peking Duk
- The Presets

4 nominations

- Infusion
- Sneaky Sound System

3 nominations

- Confidence Man
- Cut Copy
- Ivan Gough (Note: Including two as a member of TV Rock.)
- Itch-E and Scratch-E (Note: Nominated as Boo Boo and Mace! in 1997.)
- The Potbelleez
- Wicked Beat Sound System

2 nominations

- 1200 Techniques
- The Avalanches
- Stace Cadet
- Dirty South
- Peewee Ferris
- Gerling
- Hook N Sling
- Jagwar Ma
- KLP
- Hayden James
- Love Tattoo
- Gareth McGrillen (Note: One each as a member of Pendulum and Knife Party.)
- Miami Horror
- Ninajirachi
- Renegade Funktrain
- Rogue Traders
- Sgt Slick
- Sonic Animation
- Rob Swire
- TV Rock
- Alison Wonderland
