= Let It Ride =

Let It Ride may refer to:

- Let It Ride (card game), a poker variant
- Let It Ride (musical), a 1961 Broadway show
- "Let It Ride" (Bachman-Turner Overdrive song), a 1974 song
- Let It Ride (film), a 1989 comedy starring Richard Dreyfuss
- Let It Ride (Shed Seven album), 1998
- "Let It Ride" (Sgt Slick song), 2001
- "Let It Ride", a song by Ryan Adams and The Cardinals from the 2005 album Cold Roses
- Let It Ride (Buffalo Killers album), 2008
- Let It Ride, a 2013 National Geographic show
