= Bravado =

Bravado may refer to:

- The Bravados, a 1958 western film
- Bravado (EP), 2008 debut extended play by Australian electronic band Miami Horror
- Bravado (Kirin J. Callinan album), 2017
- "Bravado" (song), 2013 song by Lorde
- "Bravado", a song by Rush from their 1991 album Roll the Bones
- The Bravado Brothers, American professional wrestling tag team
