= Vision Four 5 =

Australian dance music group

- Origin: Brisbane, Queensland, Australia
- Genres: Techno, house, electronica
- Years active: 1990-1997
- Label: Volition Records

Vision Four 5 was an Australian dance music group whose performances featured interactive video technology. They were formed in 1990 in Brisbane, Queensland with Noel Burgess and fellow students Gavin Sade, Harry Ho and Ben Suthers while studying Music Technology at Queensland Conservatorium Griffith University. The lineup changed through the first few years to settle from 1993-1997 with members Noel Burgess (Music), Tim Gruchy (Video/Interactives), Ben Suthers (Music) and Al Ferguson (Video/Animation).

In this time Vision Four 5 produced 2 albums, Texture (1993) and Humid (1995) and numerous singles on Volition Records/Sony Music. They toured Australia constantly playing Big Day Out, raves and clubs alongside stable mates Boxcar (band), Itch-E and Scratch-E, Severed Heads, Southend (band), Single Gun Theory and remixed many other artists.

The rave hit "Everything You Need" was one of the highest selling Australian 12" singles and the more radio-friendly "Funkify Yourself" crossed over to become both a club and national radio hit. In 2009, "Everything You Need (Tragic rave mix)" was included on the Ministry of Sound Australia compilation, "Rave anthems 1990-1996".

The Vision Four 5 live performance incorporated a Mandala interactive system to utilize movement in the stage "control zone" to manipulate any aspect of video processing, animation or the music as well as live camera and a full music studio onstage.

All of the members of the band have pursued their specialist field since 1997 and live/work in various parts of the globe.

Noel Burgess and Ben Suthers played reunion gigs in 2002 (Syd - GAS) and 2008 (SYD - The Metro, Bris - The Met).

Vision Four 5 are featured in "BNE - The Definitive Archive: Brisbane Independent Electronic Music Production 1979-2014", which is a hardcover book and USB music archive published by Trans:Com in September 2014. The band reformed for the BNE launch event on 6 September 2014 at the Brisbane Powerhouse, with members Noel Burgess, Tim Gruchy and Al Ferguson.

In 2017, Vision Four 5 released their digital album, CLOUD, which contained previously unreleased songs.

== Other Names ==
V45 (also spelled out as a hand gesture), Vision Four Five, Vision 45, Vision Four/5, Vision 4/5.

== Discography ==
=== Original Music releases ===
1990 - Vision Four Five (cassette)
1991 - Deep Fantasy : Symedia (Vinyl EP)
1992 - Stormtrooper : Volition Records/Sony Music (CD Compilation)
1992 - Cyberphobia : Volition Records/Sony Music (Vinyl Single)
1993 - Ritual of Love : Volition Records/Sony Music (Vinyl CD Single)
1993 - Texture : Volition Records/Sony Music (CD Album)
1993 - Everything You Need : Volition Records/Sony Music (Vinyl Single)
1994 - Funkify Yourself : Volition Records/Sony Music (Vinyl CD Single)
1994 - Funkify Yourself Peewee Ferris Remix : Volition Records/Sony Music (Vinyl Single)
1994 - Humid : Volition Records/Sony Music (CD Album)
1995 - Purple Lamp : Volition Records/Sony Music (Vinyl CD Single)
2017 - CLOUD (Digital Album)
2021 - Deep Fantasy Redux: Transmission Communications/Symedia (Reissued CD & Digital Album)

=== Remixes ===
1992 - Boxcar (band) - Comet (Vision Mix) : Volition Records/Sony Music (CD Compilation)
1994 - AapogeE - The Force (Come To The Darkside Mix) : Candyline Records/Rabbit City Records (Vinyl CD compilation)
1995 - Single Gun Theory - Metaphysical (Vision Four 5 Humid Mix) : Volition Records/Sony Music (Vinyl CD Single)
1995 - Chalk - Bass Player (Remix Radio Edit) : Poppy Export Records
1995 - Southend (band) - The Dream (Vision Four 5 Remix) : Volition Records/Sony Music (Vinyl CD Single)
1996 - Infusion (band) - Green(er) (Vision Four/5 Mix) : Dance Pool
1997 - Code Warrior - Wax Is Like A Chemical (Vision Four 5 Mix) : Dance Pool

== Line Up ==
M (Music) V (Vocals) I (Interactive systems) A (Animation) Vid (Video) C (Camera) L (Lighting)

1990 - Noel Burgess(M), Gavin Sade(M), Harry Ho(M), Emma Baker Spink(V)
1991 - Noel Burgess(M), Gavin Sade(M), Ben Suthers(M), Emma Baker Spink(V), Sheree Exton(V), DJ Darren Briais
1992 - Noel Burgess(M), Gavin Sade(M), Ben Suthers(M), Sheree Exton(V), Tim Gruchy(I Vid), Mic Gruchy (C), Al Ferguson(A C), Gary Mc Feat(C), Iain Reed(L)
1993 - Noel Burgess(M), Ben Suthers(M), Tim Gruchy(I Vid), Al Ferguson(A C), Gary Mc Feat(C), Iain Reed(L)
1994 - Noel Burgess(M), Ben Suthers(M), Tim Gruchy(I Vid), Al Ferguson(A C), Lolly(V), Iain Reed(L)
1995 - Noel Burgess(M), Ben Suthers(M), Tim Gruchy(I Vid), Al Ferguson(A C), Lolly(V), Iain Reed(L)
1996 - Noel Burgess(M), Ben Suthers(M), Tim Gruchy(I Vid), Al Ferguson(A C), Iain Reed(L)
2014 - Noel Burgess(M), Tim Gruchy(I Vid), Al Ferguson(A C)
