= White Treble, Black Bass =

Single by Sgt Slick
- Released: May 1998
- Genre: Dance
- Label: Vicious Grooves
- Songwriter: Sgt. Slick
- Producer: Sgt. Slick

Sgt Slick singles chronology
"White Treble, Black Bass" (1998)	"Let It Ride" (2001)

"White Treble, Black Bass" is the debut single by Australian house music DJ and producer Sgt Slick, released in 1998. The single peaked at number 69 in Australia.

At the ARIA Music Awards of 1998, the song won Best Dance Release.

In 2015, the song was listed at number 42 in In the Mix's 100 Greatest Australian Dance Tracks of All Time with Katie Cunningham saying the ARIA Awards "got it right" with this song winning an award in 1998, calling the song an "undisputed classic".

John Course of Vicious Grooves said this song was the label's third ever release, but remains one of the label's milestone tracks. Course said "We loved the groove and signed the track, but it had a sample which we had to clear. Ironically the spoken words it samples saying 'White people turn up the treble, black people turn up the bass' was from a music documentary and ended up being the voice of a prominent music business lawyer. The lawyer was amused that he had worked in the business for years and it was the first time he ever appeared on a record, so he was happy to clear the vocal."

== Track listings ==
Australian CD Single
No.	Title	Length
1.	"White Treble, Black Bass" (radio cut)
2.	"Think About It" (radio edit)
3.	"Cha, Cha, Cha" (Slick's Trackattack)
4.	"White Treble, Black Bass" (Coursey & Rd's "Use the Filter" remix)
5.	"White Treble, Black Bass" (Slick's Original Jam)
6.	"White Treble, Black Bass" (Coursey & Rd's Funky Dub)

UK CD Single/12" Vinyl
No.	Title	Length
1.	"White Treble, Black Bass" (Trevor RockcliffeMix II)	6:14
2.	"White Treble, Black Bass" (Accapella)	0:51
3.	"White Treble, Black Bass" (Trevor Rockcliffe Mix 1)	6:02
4.	"White Treble, Black Bass" (Slick's Club'd Up Cut)	5:16

== Charts ==
Chart (1998)	Peak position
Australia (ARIA)	69

== Release history ==
Region	Date	Format	Label	Catalogue
Australia	May 1998	CD Single/ EP	Vicious Grooves	VG12003CD
United Kingdom	1999	CD Single, 12" Vinyl	Neo Records	NEO12027
Spain	1999	12" Vinyl	Plus Recordings	PLMX05
