= Mark Gravas =

Australian animator, director and producer

- Born: 29 September 1966 (age 59); Sydney, New South Wales, Australia
- Occupations: Director, writer, animator
- Years active: 1987–present
- Known for: Yakkity Yak; CJ the DJ
- Spouse: Sandra Walters

Mark Gravas (born 29 September 1966) is an Australian animator, director and producer. He is the creator and co-director of Yakkity Yak, an Australian-Canadian co-production. Gravas co-owns Sydney based media production company Kapow Pictures with his partner Sandra Walters.

Gravas directed the 2005 animated film Here Comes Peter Cottontail: The Movie, He also designed and directed the 2006 Cartoon Network production of Casper's Scare School. Gravas also co-owns the creative company Kapow Pictures, based in Sydney, Australia.

== Life and career ==
Gravas has lived in Sydney for most of his life. He left school at the end of year 10 and studied fine art, and later graphic design at Randwick Tafe. He traveled to London in his 20s and worked at various animation studios. He met his partner Sandra Walters in London. He directed a short film for Nickelodeon Ego from Mars in 1999 and also worked with Bradley Trevor Grieve BTG on Agent Green. He went on to create and direct the short film Show and Tell in 2001 which won an AACTA Award for best animated short in 2002. Gravas created, designed and directed Yakkity Yak, a children's television series for MTV Networks International in 2003. He designed and directed Here Comes Peter Cottontail: The Movie in 2005 and Casper's Scare School in 2006. He co-created, designed and directed CJ the DJ with Stu Connolly, a children's television series shown on ABC 3 in 2009. Gravas has also designed and directed music videos including "Everyone Seems to be Out to Get You" selected for Annecy Animation Festival and Tickle shown at Pictoplasma Berlin 2013.
