= CJ the DJ =

Animated television series (2009–2010)

- Genre: Animated sitcom Musical
- Created by: Stu Connolly; Mark Gravas
- Developed by: Stu Connolly; Mark Gravas
- Theme music composer: Sally-Bell Singleton
- Composer: Noel Burgess
- Countries of origin: Australia; Malaysia; France
- Original language: English
- No. of seasons: 1
- No. of episodes: 52

Production
- Executive producers: Tim Brooke-Hunt; Jenny Lalor; Sandra Walters; Low Huoi Seong
- Producer: Sandra Walters
- Editor: Daryl Davies
- Running time: 11 minutes
- Production companies: Kapow Pictures; Vision Animation; Millimages

Original release
- Network: ABC3
- Release: 4 December 2009 – 25 March 2010

CJ the DJ is an animated television series first broadcast on ABC3. The show was created by Stu Connolly and Mark Gravas and ran for 52 episodes.

== Plot ==
CJ the DJ follows the adventures of a 13-year-old girl with the nickname of CJ who wants to be a DJ. She tries to make it to the big leagues by playing gigs, promoting herself, and practicing, with the help of her best friends Lesley and Si. However, in the town where she lives, no one wants to hear about her.

== Characters ==
From left to right: Marsha, Gene, Charley, Lesley, CJ, Si, Lyle, and Arnis

- Cathleen Jones aka CJ is the eponymous main protagonist of the series. She is a 13-year-old girl who aspires to be a DJ. She loves not being like everyone else and has a unique view of the world.
- Lesley Smiles is one of CJ's friends. She is the complete opposite to CJ, but they are friends because they are both individuals.
- Si is CJ's best friend and neighbor. He is a born musician and has a passion for classical music. His background is New Zealander.
- Arnis owns a record store called "A-Trax." He gives CJ her gigs and sees potential in her.
- Lyle hangs out at Arnis' store every day after school; he also works there for free. He seems to secretly have feelings for CJ, although he still teases and bullies her.
- The Patel Twins want to be DJs only for the fame, they usually work at their dad's convenience store, They are jealous of CJ and steal her gigs, songs and even her name and cause numerous problems for herself and her friends.
- Charley Jones is CJ’s younger sister. She is ten, but she wants to be sixteen. She loves to shop and usually pokes fun at CJ’s fashion sense.
- Gene Jones is CJ and Charley’s father. He has a band that has limited appeal to most people. He lives like he is a young person.
- Marsha Jones is CJ and Charley’s mother. She's the no-nonsense voice of authority in the household and the primary source of income for the family, usually appearing in her business suit. However, in her youth, she was the lead guitarist and vocalist for an all-girl punk band.
- Mr. Truman is the evil science teacher and recurring antagonist who appears in various episodes.

Early characters design of CJ and Si.

== Episodes ==
No.	Title	Original release date
1	"The Set Up Gig"	December 4, 2009
2	"Ring Ring"	TBA
3	"What's in a Name?"	TBA
4	"Dropping Science"	TBA
5	"The Axe Factor"	TBA
6	"Original Popcorn"	TBA
7	"Licked in the Mix"	TBA
8	"Garage Clip"	TBA
9	"Si's Slide"	TBA
10	"Camps n Cakes"	TBA
11	"Hair Affaire"	TBA
12	"Glammerous Life"	TBA
13	"Store Wars"	TBA
14	"Unmasked"	TBA
15	"Monster Mash Up"	TBA
16	"Gene's Gear"	TBA
17	"Jonestown"	TBA
18	"Girl Vs Machine"	TBA
19	"Halloweenie"	TBA
20	"Just To Get a Rep"	TBA
21	"Global Grooving"	TBA
22	"Hazy Daze"	TBA
23	"Testing Times"	TBA
24	"One Hit Wonder"	TBA
25	"DJ Sim"	TBA
26	"Boogie Knights"	TBA
27	"Chick Flick"	TBA
28	"Park Life"	TBA
29	"Mind The Animals"	TBA
30	"Little Miss Charley"	TBA
31	"Home"	TBA
32	"Crew Cuts"	TBA
33	"Skate Or Lie"	TBA
34	"In the Hood"	TBA
35	"High Rollers"	TBA
36	"Curse of the Wild"	TBA
37	"Undercover Brother"	TBA
38	"Student Exchange"	TBA
39	"Check Yo Head"	TBA
40	"Hostel"	TBA
41	"Wild World of Rock"	TBA
42	"Lesleymania"	TBA
43	"Cold as Ice"	TBA
44	"Jonesville Horror"	TBA
45	"Got Game"	TBA
46	"Deeper Purple"	TBA
47	"Fixed Up"	TBA
48	"Work It Out"	TBA
49	"Blastmaster"	TBA
50	"Jazz Heist"	TBA
51	"Smells Like Team Spirit"	TBA
52	"Destroy The Band"	March 25, 2010

== Multimedia ==
=== DVD releases ===
On 1 July 2010, the Australian Broadcasting Corporation released the first DVD of CJ the DJ, featuring the first eight episodes.

Title	Release date	Episodes
CJ The DJ: Mixin' It Up!	1 July 2010	1.The Set Up Gig 2.Ring Ring 3.What's in a Name? 4.Droppin' Science 5.The Axe Factor 6.Original Popcorn 7.Licked in the Mix 8.Garage Clip

=== Digital downloads ===
CJ the DJ Series 1 Volumes 1 (episodes 1–26) and 2 (episodes 27–52) are available for download at the ABC Online Store.

=== ABC iView ===
CJ the DJ was released on ABC iView for public viewing, though each episode was only available for viewing over a limited amount of time.

=== International broadcast ===
- Brazil: Gloob
- Israel: Arutz HaYeladim (סי ג'יי הדי ג'יי)
- Portugal: RTP2
- Malaysia: TV2
- Finland: MTV Juniori
