= Transmission Communications =

Australian independent record label

- Founded: 1994
- Founder: Dennis Remmer and Anna Petrou
- Genre: Techno, industrial, electronica, synthpop, indie pop
- Country of origin: Australia
- Location: Brisbane
- Official website: http://www.trans.com.au

Transmission Communications (or Trans:Com) is an independent record label based in Brisbane, Australia. The label focuses on the production and performance of electronic music, including techno, industrial, synthpop, experimental, and all manner of crossovers.

During the 1990s, the label released a range of compilations for the Brisbane scene, including Evidence, Cyberia, and Abstraction, as well as releasing works from Pure Bunk, Low Key Operations, Sphere, Tycho Brahe, The Blood Party, All Electric Kitchen, and others. Additionally, the label has curated showcases, including Cyberia (1995), 101 (2001), the Silhouette Series (2006), and Upgrade (2007).

In September 2014, the label published "BNE – The Definitive Archive: Brisbane Independent Electronic Music Production 1979–2014", which is a hardcover book and USB music archive that features 140 bands and artists, and 261 tracks. The launch event for BNE was held on 6 September 2014 at the Brisbane Powerhouse and featured live performances from the Megamen, Vision Four 5, Soma Rasa, and Boxcar, supported by DJ Jen-E.

The label is now focussed on digital distribution and aggregation through iTunes and others, and is still involved in progressing Brisbane as one of Australia's key centres for alternative music production.

== See also ==
- List of record labels
- List of electronic music record labels
