= KLP (musician) =

Australian singer, songwriter, record producer, musician, DJ, and radio host

- Birth name: Kristy Lee Peters
- Origin: Sydney, New South Wales, Australia
- Genres: Pop; EDM; house
- Occupations: Singer; songwriter; record producer; musician; DJ; radio host
- Instruments: Vocals; production
- Years active: 2013–present
- Labels: EMI Music Australia (2014–2016)
- Website: www.klpmusic.com

Kristy Lee Peters, known professionally as KLP, is an Australian singer, songwriter, record producer, DJ and radio personality from Sydney, New South Wales. Kristy was the host and presenter on Triple J's House Party program from the years 2015 to 2018.

== Career ==
KLP has played a list of festivals and events including: Splendour in the Grass, Field Day (Sydney festival) and Falls Festival. Kristy has written music for and with Skrillex, Slumberjack, Nicole Millar, and Japanese group Banvox.

In May 2020, "Energy" peaked at number 1 on the ARIA club tracks chart as well as being nominated for ARIA Award for Best Dance Release. A Triple J reviewer called the track "A high-intensity club track complete with rave sirens, a deep groove bassline and KLP's signature vocals primed to hype up the club!"

KLP is one half on the children's music duo Diver City.

== Personal life ==
Kristy has been in a relationship with Nick Drabble from Set Mo since 2011. Their first child was born in 2019.

== Discography ==
=== Studio albums ===
List of studio albums, with release date and label shown
Title	Album details
Giver	Released: November 2019; Label: Cereus Records; Format: Digital download
Printemps	Released: November 2021; Label: Foudrage; Format: Digital download, streaming

=== Extended plays ===
List of EPs, with release date and label shown
Title	EP details
Revolution	Released: April 2013; Label: KLP; Format: Digital download
Revolution Remixed	Released: May 2013; Label: KLP; Format: Digital download
Ember	Released: October 2016; Label: KLP, UMA; Format: Digital download, streaming
Printemps (Remixes)	Released: 23 September 2022; Label: Foudrage; Format: Digital download, streaming
Alter	Released: 27 June 2024; Label: Medium Rare; Format: Digital download, streaming

=== Charted singles ===
==== As lead artist ====
List of singles, with year released, selected chart positions, certifications, and album name shown
Title	Year	Peak chart positions		Certifications	Album
Title	Year	AUS	NZ Hot	Certifications	Album
"Energy" (with Stace Cadet)	2020	70	30	ARIA: Platinum	Non-album singles
"People Happy" (with Stace Cadet)	2021	— (Note: "People Happy" did not enter the ARIA Singles Chart, but did peak at number 19 on the ARIA Club Tracks Chart.)	37		Non-album singles

==== As featured artist ====
List of singles, with year released, selected chart positions, certifications, and album name shown
Title	Year	Album
"For Days" (Satin Jackets featuring KLP)	2013	Panorama Pacifica
"Sensify Me" (Zimmer featuring KLP)	2014	Non-album single
"The Others" (Slumberjack featuring KLP)	2015	Slumberjack
"Make Me Feel" (Gold Fields featuring KLP)	2015	Non-album single
"Forever" (Snails featuring KLP)	2018	The Shell
"Goh" (What So Not and Skrillex featuring KLP)	2018	Not All the Beautiful Things
"High" (Stace Cadet featuring KLP)	2018	Non-album single
"Everything We Ever Dreamed of" (Ninajirachi, Nina Las Vegas & Kota Banks featuring KLP)	2019	Non-album single
"Get it One" (Stace Cadet featuring KLP)	2019	Non-album single
"Ride Tonight" (Benson featuring KLP)	2019	Non-album single

== Award and nominations ==
=== ARIA Music Awards ===
The ARIA Music Awards is an annual awards ceremony that recognises excellence, innovation, and achievement across all genres of Australian music.

Year	Nominee / work	Award	Result	Ref.
2020	"Energy" (with Stace Cadet)	Best Dance Release	Nominated	
2021	"People Happy" (with Stace Cadet)	Best Dance Release	Nominated	

=== National Live Music Awards ===
The National Live Music Awards (NLMAs) are a broad recognition of Australia's diverse live industry, celebrating the success of the Australian live scene. The awards commenced in 2016.

Year	Nominee / work	Award	Result	Ref.
2019	Herself	Live Electronic Act (or DJ) of the Year	Nominated	
