= Our House (band) =

- Members: Sean Quinn; Kasey Taylor

Our House is an Australian dance music band formed by Melbourne-based DJ's Sean Quinn and Kasey Taylor.

The Our House debut single "Feel My Love" was released in 1994. The follow-up single, "Dreams" reached Number 2 on the French Charts. The Our House single "Floorspace" was nominated for the 1997 ARIA Award for Best Dance Release and reached number 2 on the UK Dance charts.

In 2004 Our House released its debut album Is Your House, Our House.

== Band members ==
- Sean Quinn
- Kasey Taylor

== Discography ==
=== Studio albums ===
List of studio albums, with selected details
Title	Album details
Is Your House, Our House	Released: June 2004; Label: Global Recordings – GRCD20041; Formats: CD

=== Singles ===
- "Feel My Love" (1994)
- "Our House" (1995)
- "Floorspace" (1996)
- "Floating" (1998)
- "Soliton Wave" / "Forced" (2001)
- "Twilight" / "Fire & Ice" (2002)

== Awards ==
=== ARIA Music Awards ===
The ARIA Music Awards is an annual awards ceremony that recognises excellence, innovation, and achievement across all genres of Australian music.

Year	Nominee / work	Award	Result
1997	Floorspace	Best Dance Release	Nominated
