= Sometimes (Miami Horror song) =

Single by Miami Horror

from the album Illumination
- Released: 30 October 2009
- Genre: Indietronica
- Length: 4:13
- Label: EMI
- Songwriter(s): Benjamin Plant
- Producer(s): Benjamin Plant

Miami Horror singles chronology
"Sometimes" (2009)	"Moon Theory" (2010)

Music video
- "Miami Horror - Sometimes (official)" at YouTube

"Sometimes" is a song recorded by Australian indietronica group Miami Horror and released as the lead single from their debut album Illumination on 23 October 2009. Its lyrics primarily revolve around themes of escapism, wonder, and discovery, which carried over to the music video as well.

The song placed at number 82 on the Triple J Hottest 100 of 2009. At the ARIA Music Awards of 2010, it was nominated for Best Dance Release.

Mike Posner sampled the track's instrumental on his song "You Don't Have to Leave Me" from his album One Foot Out the Door. The song was also included as part of the soundtrack of Grand Theft Auto V in 2013, playing on Radio Mirror Park, one of the game's many radio stations.

== Music video ==
A music video directed by Rhett Wade-Ferrell was made to accompany the song and was released onto the musich3ad YouTube channel on 7 October 2009. At a total length of four minutes and eleven seconds, it displays a young man and woman, presumably a couple, running and swimming outdoors in a coastal setting. The woman finds a necklace and holds on to it, before the two of them come across a futuristic building. The video ends as both hold hands together, and the woman clutching the necklace, as they stare at what they'd discovered. As of 2021, it has over 8 million views.

== Track listing ==
Digital EP

1. "Sometimes" – 4:11
2. "Sometimes (Gloves Remix)" – 6:55
3. "Make You Mine (Fred Falke Extended Mix)" – 6:58
4. "Make You Mine (Fred Falke Extended Mix Instrumental)" – 6:57
5. "Make You Mine (Death Metal Disco Scene Extended Mix)" – 5:09

CDr Maxi-Single

1. "Sometimes (Radio Edit)" – 3:21
2. "Sometimes (Album Version Instrumental)" – 4:18
3. "Sometimes (Club Mix)" – 5:40
4. "Sometimes (Dub Mix)" – 5:40
5. "Sometimes (Gloves Extended Dub)" – 6:57
6. "Sometimes (Gloves Extended Mix)" – 6:57
7. "Sometimes (Gloves Radio Edit)" – 3:55
8. "Sometimes (Shazam Remix)" – 6:58
9. "Sometimes (Hook N Sling Remix)" – 6:28

== Charts ==
=== Weekly charts ===
Chart (2009–2010)	Peak position
Australia (ARIA)	62
Australia Club Tracks (ARIA)	2
Australia Dance Singles (ARIA)	13

=== Year-end charts ===
Chart (2010)	Position
Australia Club Tracks (ARIA)	16
Australia Dance Singles (ARIA)	49
