= Orchid for the Afterworld =

Studio album by Sonic Animation
- Released: October 1999
- Studio: Silence Is Deafening, Chaos in a Box Studios
- Genre: Dance
- Label: Global Recordings

Sonic Animation chronology
Silence is Deafening (1997)	Orchid for the Afterworld (1999)	Reality by Deception (2002)

Singles from Sonic Animation
- 1. "Love Lies Bleeding" Released: February 1999; 2. "Theophilus Thistler (An Exercise in Vowels)" Released: July 1999; 3. "Didley Squat" Released: 2000; 4. "I'm Afraid I Think I'm Human" Released: 2000

Orchid for the Afterworld is the second studio album by Australian dance and techno musical group Sonic Animation. The album was released in October 1999 and peaked at number 42 on The Australian ARIA Charts. The album was certified gold in Australia in 2005.

At the ARIA Music Awards of 2000 the album was nominated for two awards; Breakthrough Artist – Album and Best Dance Release.

== Track listing ==
Orchid Disk
No.	Title	Length
1.	"I Funk Therefore I Am"	6:48
2.	"Didley Squat"	4:23
3.	"Theophilus Thistler (An Exercise in Vowels)"	3:54
4.	"Pull the Trigger"	4:41
5.	"Constipation"	6:26
6.	"Is That a Tear?"	5:27
7.	"Love Lies Bleeding"	7:11
8.	"I'm Afraid I Think I'm Human"	6:34
9.	"4 Leaf Clover"	4:36
10.	"Throne From The Saddle" (vocals by Adrian Cartwright)	4:53
11.	"The Nothingness"	5:36

Afterworld Disk
No.	Title	Length
1.	"The Nothingness" (Chaos in a Box Remix)	6:46
2.	"Theta State"	7:40
3.	"Sugar Spun Sadness"	6:14
4.	"Joyride"	7:03
5.	"Love Lies Bleeding" (House of Rector mix)	8:16
6.	"Release"	6:13
7.	"Catacaustic"	7:35
8.	"Orchid For The Afterworld"	10:55

- all vocal by Rupert Keiller, unless noted.

== Charts ==
Chart (1999/2000)	Peak position
Australian Albums (ARIA)	42

== Certifications ==
Region	Certification	Certified units/sales
Australia (ARIA)	Gold	35,000^{^}
^{^} Shipments figures based on certification alone.

== Release history ==
Region	Date	Format	Label	Catalogue
Australia	October 1999	2xCD	Global Recordings	GRA591002
Australia	October 2005	CD	Global Recordings	GRA591002
Worldwide	2017	digital download; streaming	—	
