= Is It Love? (Chili Hi Fly song) =

- Australian CD single cover art

Single by Chili Hi Fly
- Released: 1998
- Length: 3:20
- Label: Tinted
- Songwriter(s): Claydes Charles Smith; Eumir Deodato; James "J.T." Taylor; Robert "Kool" Bell; Robert Mickens; Roland Bell; Noel Burgess; Simon Lewicki
- Producer(s): Noel Burgess; Simon Lewicki

Chili Hi Fly singles chronology
"Is It Love?" (1998)	"It's Alright" (2002)

"Is It Love?" is a song by the Australian music collective Chili Hi Fly. The song was released in 1998 and peaked at number 57 on the ARIA Charts. The song contains a sample of Kool & the Gang's "Be My Lady".

At the ARIA Music Awards of 2000, the song was nominated for Best Dance Release.

== Track listings ==
Australian 12" single (Tinted Records – TINT 008)
No.	Title	Length
1.	"Is It Love?" (featuring Andy Seymour on vocals; vocal extended mix)
2.	"Is It Love?" (featuring Andy Seymour on vocals; F.I.S.T. remix)

Australian 12" single (Tinted Records – TINT 009)
No.	Title	Length
1.	"Is It Love?" (featuring Andy Seymour on vocals; Original Bootie mix)
2.	"Take Me to the Disco"

Australian CD single (TINT CD5 022)
No.	Title	Length
1.	"Is It Love?" (featuring Andy Seymour on vocals; radio edit)	3:20
2.	"Is It Love?" (featuring Andy Seymour on vocals; 12" remix)	6:51
3.	"Is It Love?" (F.I.S.T. mix)	7:42
4.	"Take Me to the Disco"	6:17

== Charts ==
Chart performance for "Is It Love?"
Chart (1998)	Peak position
Australia (ARIA)	57
United Kingdom (OCC)	37
