= Love Lies Bleeding (Sonic Animation song) =

Single by Sonic Animation

from the album Orchid for the Afterworld
- Released: February 1999
- Length: 4:18
- Label: Global Records
- Songwriter(s): Adrian Cartwright and Rupert Keiller

Sonic Animation singles chronology
| "From Sand to Stars" (1995) | "Love Lies Bleeding" (1999) | "Theophilus Thistler (An Exercise in Vowels)" (1999) |

"Love Lies Bleeding" is a song by Australian dance and techno band, Sonic Animation. It was released in February 1999 as the lead single from Sonic Animation's second studio album, Orchid for the Afterworld. The song peaked at number 50 on the ARIA charts.

At the ARIA Music Awards of 1999, the song was nominated for Best Dance Release.

== Track listing ==
CD Single (GRS1111)

1. "Love Lies Bleeding" (Exordium) - 4:00
2. "Love Lies Bleeding" (Radio edit) - 4:18
3. "Love Lies Bleeding" (Love Lies Beating radio mix) - 4:16
4. "Love Lies Bleeding" (Love Lies Beating Full mix) - 7:11
5. "Love Lies Bleeding" (Bleeding Bass Chasin' Heavens mix) - 6:10

12" Single (ML10709)

1. "Love Lies Bleeding" (Album Length mix)
2. "Love Lies Bleeding" (Love Lies Beating Full mix)
3. "Love Lies Bleeding" (House of Rector mix)
4. "Love Lies Bleeding" (Bleeding Bass Chasin' Heavens mix)

== Charts ==
| Chart (1999) | Peak position |
|---|---|
| Australia (ARIA) | 50 |

== Release history ==
| Country | Date | Format | Label | Catalogue |
|---|---|---|---|---|
| Australia | February 1999 | CD Single | Global Recordings | GRS1111 |
| Australia | 1999 | 12" Vinyl | Global Recordings | ML10709 |
