= Six Feet Above Yesterday =

Studio album by Infusion
- Released: 20 September 2004
- Studios: 001, Melbourne; Allan Eaton, Melbourne; Sing Sing, Melbourne
- Genre: Electronica
- Length: 65:24
- Label: Sony BMG
- Producers: Manuel Sharrad, Jamie Stevens, Frank Xavier

Infusion chronology
Phrases and Numbers (2000)	Six Feet Above Yesterday (2004)	All Night Sun Light (2009)

Singles from Six Feet Above Yesterday
- 1. "Girls Can Be Cruel" Released: April 2004; 2. "Better World" Released: June 2004; 3. "The Careless Kind" Released: December 2004; 4. "Natural" Released: March 2005

Six Feet Above Yesterday is the second studio album by Australian electronica and dance music trio Infusion. It was released in September 2004 and peaked at number 61 on the ARIA Charts. At the ARIA Music Awards of 2005, the album won the Best Dance Release.

== Background ==
Infusion started work on their second studio album, Six Feet Above Yesterday, in late 2002 with the line-up of Manuel Sharrad, Jamie Stevens and Frank Xavier – all on synthesisers and vocals. In October 2003, the group relocated to Melbourne from Sydney and signed with Sony BMG. They started on the album by making demo recordings at their own studio, in Carlton. They travelled to London in January 2004 to work on it, but returned to various Melbourne studios to record it with all three band members as producers.

The trio were joined in the studio by session musicians, who provided guitars, cellos, horns, vibraphones, violins, trumpets and trombones. Session musicians included Clint Hyndman from Something for Kate on drums, members of the Melbourne Symphony Orchestra, and John Davis from Daft Punk.

Ahead of the album they issued two singles, "Girls Can Be Cruel" in April 2004 and "Better World" in June. Six Feet Above Yesterday was released on 20 September 2004, which peaked at No. 61 on the ARIA albums chart. "The Careless Kind" was issued as its third single in December. "Natural", which appeared as a bonus track on a later album version, was issued as the album's fourth single in March 2005.

== Awards and nominations ==
At the ARIA Music Awards of 2005, Six Feet Above Yesterday won the ARIA Award for Best Dance Release. It was their second consecutive win of that category, they won in 2004 with "Girls Can Be Cruel". At the APRA Music Awards of 2005 the song was nominated for Most Performed Dance Work, while "Natural" was nominated in the same category in the following year.

== Track listing ==
All tracks written by Manuel Sharrad, Jamie Matthew Stevens and Francis Eugene Xavier.

1. "Better World" – 3:30
2. "The Careless Kind" – 5:04
3. "Feeding from the Hand" – 2:55
4. "Girls Can Be Cruel" – 3:58
5. "Love and Imitation" – 7:35
6. "Daylight Hours" – 7:20
7. "Invisible" – 5:05
8. "Best in Show" – 5:14
9. "Rattlewasp" – 5:15
10. "Dream" – 4:18
11. "We Follow. I Fly." – 2:41
12. "Always There" – 5:46
13. "Continental Drift" – 3:07

=== Bonus Track ===
14. "Natural (Radio Edit Long)" – 3:36

=== Special Edition Disc Two ===
1. "Natural (Extended Version)" – 8:07
2. "Girls Can Be Cruel (King Unique Danger Dub)" – 6:55
3. "Girls Can Be Cruel (Dylan Rhymes Remix)" – 7:04
4. "The Careless Kind (Evil Nine Remix)" – 8:14
5. "The Careless Kind (Naum Gabo Remix)" – 5:46
6. "The Careless Kind (Switch Mix)" – 6:20
7. "Better World (Wink Interpretation)" – 8:59
8. "Better World (Adam Freeland Mix)" – 6:42
9. "Do to You (In '82)" – 7:55

== Charts ==
Chart (2004)	Peak position
Australian Albums (ARIA Charts)	61

== In popular culture ==
"Better World (Adam Freeland Mix)" was featured in Burnout Revenge in 2005.
