= Energy (Stace Cadet and KLP song) =

Single by Stace Cadet & KLP
- Released: 24 April 2020
- Genre: Tech House
- Length: 3:28
- Label: Medium Rare; Sony
- Songwriters: Ben O'Connor; Kristy Lee Peters; Stasi Kotaras
- Producers: Stace Cadet; KLP and Benson

Stace Cadet singles chronology
"Chase" (2019)	"Energy" (2020)	"People Happy" (2021)

KLP singles chronology
"Ride Tonight" (2019)	"Energy" (2020)	"Feel the Love" (2020)

"Energy" is a song by Australian musicians Stace Cadet and KLP. It was released on 24 April 2020 and peaked at number 70 on the ARIA Singles Chart, becoming both artists' first single to peak inside the ARIA top 100.

The song peaked at number 1 on the ARIA club tracks for four weeks in May and June 2020. Various remixes of the song have been released since July 2020.

At the ARIA Music Awards of 2020, the song was nominated for Best Dance Release.

== Reception ==
A Triple J reviewer called the track "A high-intensity club track complete with rave sirens, a deep groove bassline and KLP's signature vocals primed to hype up the club!"

A Music Feeds reviewer said "The title says it all – it's a club-ready banger oriented around its grooving bass line, hypnotic percussion and KLP's vocals, guaranteed to make dance floors go off whenever that's allowed again."

== Track listing ==
Digital download
No.	Title	Length
1.	"Energy"	3:28

Digital download – LO'99 Remix
No.	Title	Length
1.	"Energy" (LO'99 Remix)	3:50
2.	"Energy"	3:28

Digital download – Mell Hall Remix
No.	Title	Length
1.	"Energy" (Mell Hall Remix)	3:53
2.	"Energy"	3:28

Digital download – Holmes John Remix
No.	Title	Length
1.	"Energy" (Holmes John Remix)	3:01
2.	"Energy"	3:28

Digital download – Endor Remix
No.	Title	Length
1.	"Energy" (Endor Remix)	3:24
2.	"Energy"	3:28

== Charts ==
=== Weekly charts ===
Chart (2020–2021)	Peak position
Australia (ARIA)	70

=== Year-end charts ===
Chart (2020)	Position
Australian Artist (ARIA)	48

== Certifications ==
Region	Certification	Certified units/sales
Australia (ARIA)	Platinum	70,000^{‡}
^{‡} Sales+streaming figures based on certification alone.
