= Renegade Funktrain =

Renegade Funktrain is an Australian groove band that formed in 1994.

Renegade Funktrain was formed by former Sound Unlimited members Rosano and Tina Martinez along with Dereck Antunes. Their single "I Wonder" (a Buddhist-influenced reworking of the Boz Scaggs' song) was nominated for the ARIA Award for Best Dance Release as was their album Renegade Funktrain.

== Members ==
- Rosano Martinez – vocals
- Tina Martinez – vocals, keyboards
- Dereck Antunes – drums, vocals, keyboards
- Brian `DJ A.S.K.' Patrick – turntables
- Ramesh Sathiah – keyboards
- Juan Gonzalez – guitar, vocals
- Adam Dehnen – bass
- Craig Calhoun

== Discography ==
=== Albums ===
List of albums, with selected details and chart positions
Title	Album details	Peak chart positions
Title	Album details	AUS
Renegade Funktrain	Released: April 1996; Label: EastWest (0630119612); Formats: CD	46

=== Singles ===
List of singles, with selected chart positions
Title	Year	Peak chart positions	Album
Title	Year	AUS	Album
"Testify"	1993	—	Renegade Funktrain
"I Wonder"	1995	68	Renegade Funktrain
"Renegade Funktrain"/"I Wonder"	1996	48	Renegade Funktrain
"Joy"	1996	—	Renegade Funktrain

== Awards and nominations ==
=== ARIA Music Awards ===
The ARIA Music Awards is an annual awards ceremony that recognises excellence, innovation, and achievement across all genres of Australian music.

Year	Nominee / work	Award	Result
1995	"I Wonder"	Best Dance Release	Nominated
1996	Renegade Funktrain	Best Dance Release	Nominated
