= Stace Cadet =

Australian record producer

- Born: Stasi Kotaras Adelaide, South Australia , Australia
- Genres: EDM; house
- Occupations: Record producer; musician; DJ
- Years active: 2015–present
- Label: Warner Music Australia (2023+)
- Partner: Erin McNaught (engaged)

Stasi Kotaras, best known by his stage name Stace Cadet, is an Australian record producer from South Australia.

Since the release of his first record "Molly Happy", Stace Cadet has played festivals and headlining shows around Australia and New Zealand and had achieved three ARIA Club Track number 1, as the lead artist and his music played on Triple J and BBC Radio 1.

== Career ==
Stace Cadet released his debut single "Molly Happy" in February 2016.

In June 2018, "One Way" peaked at number 1 on the ARIA club tracks chart.

He is of Greek Heritage.

In January 2019 "Faith" with Benson peaked at number 1 on the ARIA club tracks chart and in November 2019, "Get on It" did also.

In May 2020, "Energy" peaked at number 1 on the ARIA club tracks chart, for three weeks. A Triple J reviewer called the track "A high-intensity club track complete with rave sirens, a deep groove bassline and KLP's signature vocals primed to hype up the club!"

In January 2023, Stace Cadet released "Light Me Up", the first single since signing to Warner Music Australia and Medium Rare Recordings.

== Personal life ==
Cadet is currently in a relationship with Australian model and actress Erin McNaught. In May 2024, Cadet and McNaught announced they were expecting their first child together. In October 2024, she gave birth to their son, Obi Brooks Kotaras. In May 2026, Cadet announced he and McNaught are engaged.

== Discography ==
=== Singles ===
==== As lead artist ====
List of singles, with year released, selected chart positions, certifications, and album name shown
Title	Year	Peak chart positions		Certifications	Album
Title	Year	AUS	NZ Hot	Certifications	Album
"Molly Happy"	2016	—	—		Non-album singles
"Way Back Home"	2017	—	—		Non-album singles
"One Way" (with Hood Rich)	2018	—	—		Non-album singles
"High" (featuring KLP)	2018	90	—		Non-album singles
"Abracadabra"	2019	—	—		Non-album singles
"The Circus"	2019	—	—		Non-album singles
"Safe" (with Kyle Watson)	2019	—	—		Non-album singles
"Get on It" (featuring KLP)	2019	—	—		Non-album singles
"Energy" (with KLP)	2020	70	30	ARIA: Platinum	Non-album singles
"People Happy" (with KLP)	2021	— (Note: "People Happy" did not enter the ARIA Singles Chart, but did peak at number 19 on the ARIA Club Tracks Chart.)	37		Non-album singles
"Light Me Up"	2023	—	—		Non-album singles
"Alright Ok"	2023	—	—		Non-album singles
"Wanted" (with What So Not and The Upbeats)	2026	—	—		Non-album singles

==== As featured artist ====
List of singles, with year released and album name shown
Title	Year	Album
"Talking Bass" (Airwolf featuring Stace Cadet)	2016	Non-album singles
"Can't Get" (Terace featuring Stace Cadet)	2018	Non-album singles
"Nimble Like Jack" (Volac and Rrotik featuring Stace Cadet)	2018	Non-album singles
"Faith" (Benson featuring Stace Cadet and Yeah Boy)	2018	Non-album singles
"Chase" (The Journey featuring Stace Cadet)	2019	Non-album singles

== Award and nominations ==
=== ARIA Music Awards ===
The ARIA Music Awards is an annual awards ceremony that recognises excellence, innovation, and achievement across all genres of Australian music.

Year	Nominee / work	Award	Result	Ref.
2020	"Energy" (with KLP)	Best Dance Release	Nominated	
2021	"People Happy" (with KLP)	Best Dance Release	Nominated	
