= Sgt Slick =

- Born: Andrew James Ramanauskas
- Origin: Melbourne, Australia
- Genres: House, electronic
- Occupations: DJ, producer
- Years active: 1995–present
- Labels: Vicious Grooves, Purple Eye, Neo, SKAM

Andrew James Ramanauskas, also known as Sgt Slick, is a house music DJ and producer from Melbourne, Australia, sometimes known as Andy J or L'TRIC. Sgt Slick is best known for his ARIA Music Award winning 1998 single "White Treble, Black Bass". Sgt Slick's career as a producer has opened doors to gigs and shows all across Australia and Asia and also led to a 7-year relocation to the USA.

== Career ==
In May 1998, Sgt Slick released his debut single "White Treble, Black Bass", which peaked at No. 69 on the Australian ARIA Singles Chart. It topped club charts in Australia and Europe.

At the ARIA Music Awards of 1998, Sgt Slick won ARIA Award for Best Dance Release.

In July 2001, Sgt Slick released "Let It Ride" which peaked at number 95 on the ARIA Charts. At ARIA Music Awards of 2001, the song was nominated for Best Dance Release. It peaked at No. 95.

In June 2010, Sgt Slick released "Back on Black" which reached No. 69.

Since 2011, Sgt Slick has continued to release singles that have charted on global club charts and are on the playlists of successful DJs.

In 2019, Sgt Slick returned to his hometown of Melbourne.

In February 2020, Sgt Slick released a cover of ABBA's "Gimme! Gimme! Gimme! (A Man After Midnight)" after a friend of his said it had been played on Greek Islands the year before. Sgt Slick said it was his favorite ABBA song and it planted an idea to remix it. He said "I threw some extra drums in to bring it up to date a little bit, threw in some filtering to make it sound a little more modern and have a bit more punch." He played it to some of his friends who raved about it, so he decided to record an official version. Rather than recording a remix, Slick decided to remake his track from scratch as a cover version. A friend in the UK tracked down two female ABBA impersonators for the vocals and got all the music from the original. Sgt Slick said "It's timeless disco. I didn't want to make it too modern, not a house record with a drum beat, I wanted to choose sounds that accentuated what was already there and just made it a little more dynamic and low end and something DJs can play next to new music but that doesn't necessarily sound like new music."

In July 2023, Sgt Slick released "Just Keep Walking" with INXS.

== Discography ==
=== Charting or certified singles ===
List of singles, with selected chart positions and certifications
Year	Title	Peak chart positions	Certifications
Year	Title	AUS	Certifications
1998	"White Treble, Black Bass"	69	
2001	"Let It Ride"/"Forever Disco"	95	
2005	"Tilt My Hat" (as Andy J)	68	
2010	"Back on Black" (with Chardy)	69	
2020	"Gimme! Gimme! Gimme!"	—	ARIA: Gold

== Awards and nomination ==
=== ARIA Music Awards ===
The ARIA Music Awards are a set of annual ceremonies presented by Australian Recording Industry Association (ARIA), which recognize excellence, innovation, and achievement across all genres of Australian music. They commenced in 1987. Sgt Slick has won 1 awards from 2 nominations.

Year	Nominee / work	Award	Result
1998	"White Treble Black Bass"	Best Dance Release	Won
2001	"Let It Ride"	Best Dance Release	Nominated

=== APRA Awards ===
The APRA Awards are several award ceremonies run in Australia by the Australasian Performing Right Association (APRA) to recognise composing and song writing skills, sales and airplay performance by its members annually. Sgt Slick has been nominated for one award.

Year	Nominee / work	Award	Result
2002	"Let It Ride"	Most Performed Dance Work	Nominated
