= Sonic Animation =

Australian musical group

- Origin: Melbourne, Victoria, Australia
- Genres: Dance; techno; electronica
- Years active: 1994–2006; 2011–present
- Labels: Azwan Transmissions; Global / Festival Mushroom; Sputnik / Festival
- Members: Adrian Cartwright; Bosco Martin; Ronnie Winter; Jason Einstein; Primus Baxter
- Past members: Steve Bertschik; Rupert Keiller; Mark Saul; Richard Falkner; Erica Mclean
- Website: sonicanimation.com

Sonic Animation (stylised as sonicanimation) are an Australian dance and techno musical group which was formed by Adrian Cartwright on keyboards, drums and programming and Rupert Keiller on lead vocals and programming in 1994. The group disbanded in 2006 and then reformed in 2011. Altogether, they have released five studio albums, Silence Is Deafening (May 1997), Orchid for the Afterworld (October 1999), Reality by Deception (2002), Defective Perspective (2004) and Once More from the Bottom (March 2013).

== History ==
=== 1994–1998: Formation and Silence Is Deafening ===
Sonic Animation were formed in Melbourne by Steve Bertschik as a DJ, Adrian Cartwright on drums, keyboards and programming and Canadian-born Rupert Keiller on lead vocals and programming in 1994. Cartwright on drums and Keiller on vocals were both members of Scarlet Garden, a rock group formed in the early 1990s in Geelong. The pair had met as employees at a local graphic design business.

Cartwright recalled "I absolutely hated dance music ... But Rupert took me to a rave, and that was it for me. I'd always thought that dance music was so minimalist and easy, but when you get into it it's actually quite intricate and complex. I loved that. And then when we heard what Underworld were doing with vocals, we wanted to do that, too." In 1995 Sonic Animation released their debut single, "Time Is an Illusion", on a self-funded independent label. They followed with "From Sand to Stars", Zero Zero Zero Zero One and Force Feed.

Their debut studio album, Silence Is Deafening, was issued on Azwan Transmissions in May 1997. All the tracks were written, produced and engineered by Sonic Animation. At that time they were using a 386 computer for programming. In March 2002 Keiller recalled how "people would yell out 'nice one 386!', cos you know, we didn't really do anything, it was all just the computer. There are still some people that hold that view but we don't see it as much because of the kind of shows we play these, days." Bertschik left the group in 1998 to "pursue his own musical interests." The band signed with a new label: Global Recordings / Festival / FIIDO.

=== 1999–2005: Commercial success ===
In January 1999 the group issued a single, "Love Lies Bleeding", which reached the ARIA Singles Chart top 50. Jasper Lee of Oz Music Project felt that it "builds up into full blown dance goodness with no doubt an anthem to club culture with the main vocal". Its lyrics contain a reference to illegal drugs, "I feel ecstasy". This initially concerned Keiller "I used to be worried about that sort of stuff — I don't know why — but nothing so far has happened." "Theophilus Thistler" was released as a single in August 1999, which received high rotation on national radio station, Triple J, its popularity was assisted by the track's associated music video. The video featured their two mascots, or TechoTubbies, dubbed Robert Roley and Theophilus Thistler. At live performances the mascots' suits are worn by two fans selected by the band via their web site. "Theophilus Thistler" appeared on the ARIA Singles Chart top 100 and was listed at No. 18 on the Triple J Hottest 100, 1999, in a listeners poll.

The group's second studio album, Orchid for the Afterworld, was issued on 11 October 1999 on Global Records which peaked at No. 42 on the ARIA Albums Chart. In 2005 the album was certified gold for shipment of 35,000 copies by ARIA. Lee attended their gig in April 2000 at Macquarie University, he noticed "a weird mix of a rave and a mosh, with those up the front of the crowd firmly squashed in against the foldback speakers. Nonetheless everyone was having a great time, and enjoyed what Sonic Animation had to offer."

Sonic Animation's third studio album, Reality by Deception, was released on 4 February 2002, which peaked at No. 22 on the ARIA Albums Chart and No. 6 on the ARIA Dance chart. Lee felt the album "pares back the more commercially-friendly vocals... in favour of more straight trance-light tracks more akin to their clubbing roots... [They] have flowed with a different aim in mind that has seen a decent, although not terribly inspiring release." It provided the singles, "E-Ville" (October 2001), "I'm a DJ" (February 2002) and "Super Showbiz Star" (April 2002). "I'm a DJ" was listed at No. 74 on the Triple J Hottest 100, 2002.

Sonic Animation's fourth studio album, Defective Perspective was released on 9 February 2004, which provided the singles, "This Is not a Love Poem" and "Get Up". "This Is not a Love Poem" was based on lyrics by Philip Norton. Leasa de Klerk of InTheMix felt that the two CDs provided a "sheer variety of styles and sounds that are on the album. The guys are really showing their flexibility in their lastest [sic] offering."

Sonic Animation announced their break-up in mid-2005 with the release of compilation album, Eleven (September 2005), which appeared on the ARIA Dance Albums Chart top 25. It was followed by the Bugger Off tour. They made their last festival appearance at the Big Day Out in 2006 (Australian shows only).

=== 2011–present: reformation and Once More from the Bottom ===
In 2011 Cartwright and Keiller revealed a new Sonic Animation remix for world music outfit, Delhi 2 Dublin. They announced that they were back in the studio recording their next album.

In March 2013, after an almost six-year hiatus, Sonic Animation released their fifth studio album, Once More from the Bottom. Adam Barbuto of Reverb noticed that "you get the feeling the lads from Sonic Animation have thrown their all into these songs and take this comeback super seriously. To somewhat refute any lack of confidence buyers may have had in the naming of the album, Once More from the Bottom, I can safely say SonicAnimation are anywhere near it. In fact I'd say they are back on track and heading for those big city lights." Rip It Up!'s Simone Keenan felt that "Although there's plenty of odd-ball tracks ... there is some quality too like the hip hop/dubstep 'Punk on the Dance Floor' (which sounds better than the title may suggest) and 'Take It from Me' which features guest vocals from Canadian songstress Sexton Blake. Dub, techno, funk, house... You'll find all of it on here." The album provided the single, "I Will Be Twisted"; its music video was created with fan-submitted footage taken on cell phones at the 2012 Homebake festival.

== Members ==
Sonic animation are:

- Adrian Cartwright
- Rupert Keiller

with:

- Steve Bertschik (circa 1994–1998)
- Mark Saul (circa 1999–2001)
- Richard Falkner (circa 2002–2004)
- Erica Mclean (circa 2004–2006)
- Sexton Blake aka Nadine Tremblay (circa 2012–2013)

== Discography ==
=== Albums ===
List of studio albums, with selected details and chart positions
Title	Album details	Peak chart positions	Certifications
Title	Album details	AUS	Certifications
Silence is Deafening	Released: May 1997; Label: Azwan Transmissions (AZWAN024CD); Format: CD	—	
Orchid for the Afterworld	Released: October 1999; Label: Global Recordings (GRA591002); Format: 2×CD	42	ARIA: Gold
Reality by Deception	Released: February 2002; Label: Sputnik Records (334742); Format: CD+CD_Rom	22	
Defective Perspective	Released: 9 February 2004; Label: SA (sonic027cd); Format: 2×CD, digital download	199	
Once More from the Bottom	Released: March 2013; Label: self-released, distributed by MGM Distribution (SA0012013); Format: CD, digital download	—	

=== Compilation albums ===
List of compilation albums, with release date and label details shown
Title	Album details
Eleven	Released: September 2005; Label: Inertia (sonic011cd); Format: 2×CD, digital download

=== Extended plays ===
List of EP, with release date and label details shown
Title	EP details
Zero Zero Zero Zero One	Released: 1995; Label: Azwan Transmissions (AZWAN016); Format: CD, 12"
Force Feed	Released: 1996; Label: Azwan Transmissions (AZWAN018); Format: CD, 12"
Silence Is Deafening 1	Released: 1997; Label: Azwan Transmissions (AZWAN023); Format: 12"
Silence Is Deafening 2	Released: 1997; Label: Azwan Transmissions (AZWAN026); Format: 12"
sonicanimation	Released: August 2011; Label: Creative Vibes; Format: Digital download

=== Singles ===
List of singles, with year released and selected chart positions
Title	Year	Peak chart positions	Album
Title	Year	AUS	Album
"Time Is an Illusion"	1995	—	Non-album singles
"From Sand to Stars"	1995	—	Non-album singles
"Love Lies Bleeding"	1999	50	Orchid for the Afterworld
"Theophilus Thistler (An Exercise in Vowels)"	1999	86	Orchid for the Afterworld
"Didley Squat"	2000	114	Orchid for the Afterworld
"I'm Afraid I Think I'm Human"	2000	133	Orchid for the Afterworld
"E-Ville"	2001	73	Reality by Deception
"I'm a DJ"	2002	86	Reality by Deception
"Super Showbiz Star"	2002	142	Reality by Deception
"Freaky Highway"	2003	—	Defective Perspective
"This Is Not a Love Poem"	2004	—	Defective Perspective
"Get Up"	2004		Defective Perspective
"Will You Dance to This Song"	2011	—	sonicanimation
"(Hey Lady) I Just Wanna Dance"	2012	—	One More from the Bottom
"Punk on the Dancefloor"	2013	—	One More from the Bottom

== Awards ==
=== ARIA Music Awards ===
The ARIA Music Awards is an annual awards ceremony that recognises excellence, innovation, and achievement across all genres of Australian music. Sonic Animation has been nominated for three awards.

Year	Nominee / work	Award	Result
1999	"Love Lies Bleeding"	Best Dance Release	Nominated
2000	Orchid for the Afterworld	Best Dance Release	Nominated
2000	Orchid for the Afterworld	Breakthrough Artist – Album	Nominated
