= Miami Horror =

Australian electronic music group

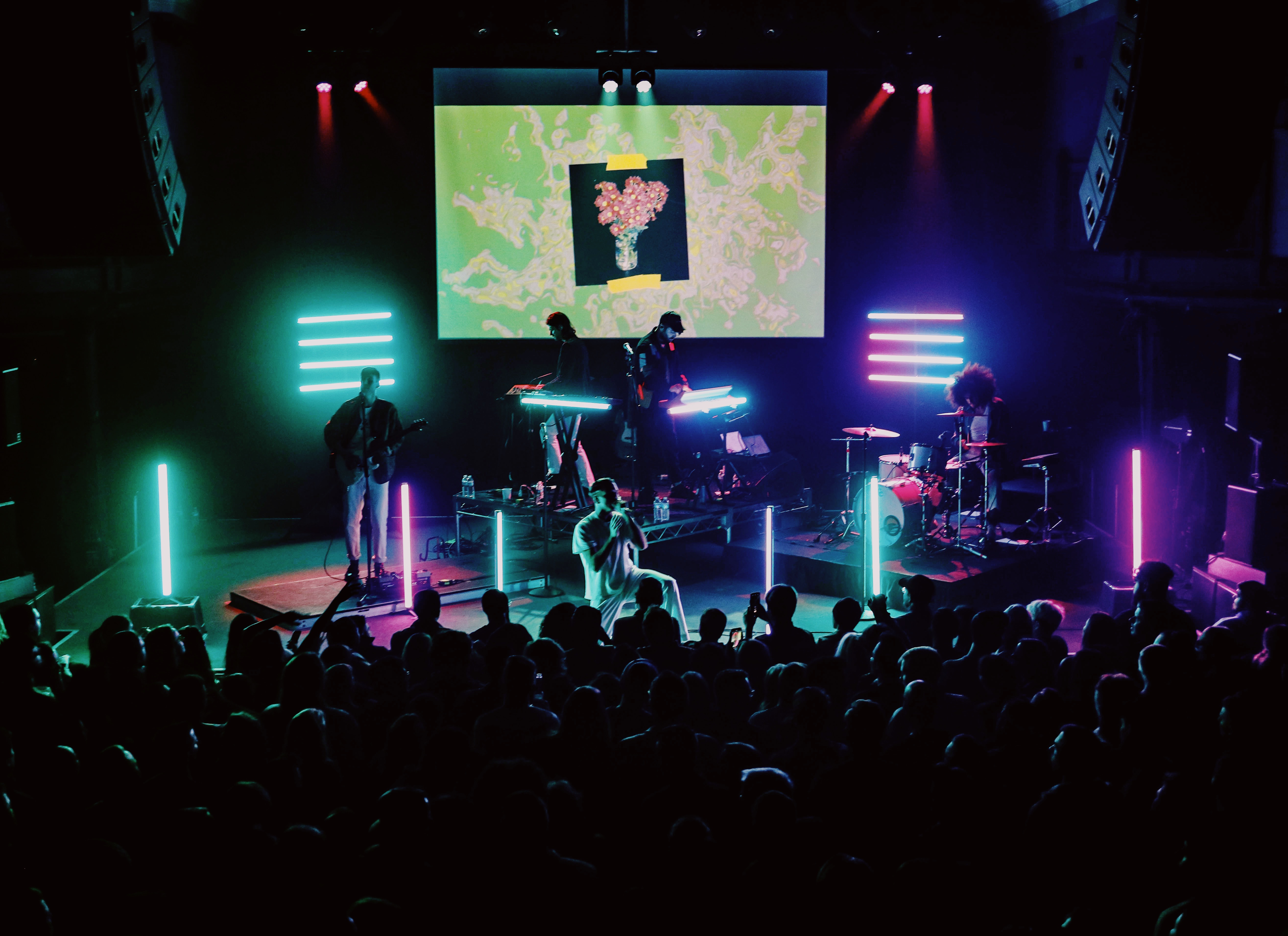
- Miami Horror performing in Washington, D.C., in 2019

Background information
- Origin: Melbourne, Victoria, Australia
- Genres: Electropop; synth-pop; dance-pop; nu-disco; indie electronic
- Years active: 2008–present
- Labels: Virgin; EMI; Vitalic Noise; Remote Control; Dine Alone; Manhattan
- Members: Benjamin Plant; Daniel Whitechurch
- Website: www.miamihorror.com

Miami Horror are an Australian electronic music group from Melbourne, Victoria. Benjamin Plant, the producer and DJ, formed Miami Horror initially as a solo project. In addition to Plant, the band features Daniel Whitechurch (keyboards), and currently Rhythm Luna (drums), while featuring different vocalists and guitar players including Reva Devito (vocals), TC Milan of Crush Club (vocals), Nicolas Mulhall of Queen Magic (guitar), and Tom Frazer (guitar). The band takes influence from dance and rock artists of the 1970s and 1980s such as Prince, New Order, Todd Rundgren, and Pink Floyd, combining it with modern production techniques from styles such as house and pop music.

Plant debuted in the music scene with his EP Bravado, released in 2008. His debut album Illumination was released in 2010 and debuted at Number 10 on the Australian Chart, which featured collaborations with Josh Moriarty and Daniel Whitechurch, along with features from Neon Indian and Kimbra, while their second more collaborative album, All Possible Futures, in 2015. A second EP titled The Shapes followed in 2017 as a conceptual effort to explore a new sound. Additionally, they have remixed songs from other artists such as Gorillaz, Pnau, Ratatat, and Phantogram, among others.

== Biography ==
In 2007, Plant began releasing remixes under the moniker Miami Horror; their instantaneous blog success led him to leave film school and pursue a career in music. A series of both bootleg and official remixes included Stardust's "Music Sounds Better with You" and Tegan and Sara's "Walking with a Ghost", along with contemporary Australian acts such as the Midnight Juggernauts, Faker, and The Presets. According to Plant, the name Miami Horror "was just a visual thing. I thought both words were pretty bold in themselves, but also have quite a strong visual side. Miami representing the colorful and flamboyant side, while horror represents the darker." He has said that he "didn't like it for the first two weeks", but he "learnt to live with it".

Plant began his music career early on, producing music at home from a young age, often DJing at house parties and regular weekly Melbourne club nights such as Streetparty and Third Class. In 2008 he remixed Pnau, The Presets, and Bloc Party. Miami Horror has also collaborated with Melbourne electropop group Gameboy/Gamegirl in 2007 and produced the Golden Ghetto Sex EP which featured the single "Sweaty Wet/Dirty Damp", a one-off single that became a left-field hit in the music blogosphere the same year.

As Miami Horror, Plant made his commercial debut in 2008 with a five-track EP, Bravado, on Virgin Records. The EP features the song "Don't Be on with Her", for which a promotional video was released online. Miami Horror has since been signed to EMI for distribution in Australia and France.

Miami Horror's live show is formed by Benjamin Plant (bass, keyboards), Daniel Whitechurch (bass, keyboards, and guitars), and Rhythm Luna(drums) with various other members providing vocals and guitar depending on the tour. The live incarnation of Miami Horror has appeared at Coachella, Corona Capital, Governors Ball, Groovin The Moo, Splendour in the Grass, Electric Forest and many more. The band has also supported Phoenix, and Friendly Fires on their Australian tours.

In late 2009 the band released their first major single "Sometimes" to commercial success, receiving frequent airplay on radio stations and club circuits. They later released their debut album Illumination on 20 August 2010 with debuted at number 10 on the ARIA Charts, with further singles including "Moon Theory" and "I Look to You" (the latter featuring Kimbra), each single receiving a music video alongside them. The fourth single, "Holidays", received a music video as well.

On 10 September 2013, the roll-out for their second album, All Possible Futures started with the release of "Real Slow", a collaboration with Sarah Chernoff. Coincidentally, Grand Theft Auto V was released the following week, where "Sometimes" was featured as part of its in-game radio station, Radio Mirror Park. A follow-up single with Cleopold, "Colours in the Sky", was released that November. In 2014, another single, "Wild Motion (Set It Free)" was released. The album itself was released on 21 April 2015. It debuted at number 65 on the ARIA Albums Chart in May 2015, with later singles including "Love Like Mine" (also with Cleopold), and "Cellophane (So Cruel)" (with Aaron Tiem & Gavin Turek). The band performed at Coachella Valley Music & Arts Festival, Corona Capital Festival, Electric Forest, and many other festivals in support of All Possible Futures.

The departure of Aaron Shanahan was announced on 12 December 2016. The next year, the band independently released the EP The Shapes, featuring the single "Leila" which reached commercial success and frequent airplay in Japan, as well as Latin America where a Spanish version of "Leila" was also released and serviced to radio. Miami Horror produced and curated their own highly successful block parties in Sydney, Melbourne, and New York with acts like Touch Sensitive, Running Touch, and Late Nite Tuff Guy.

In 2019 the group released two new singles, "Restless" and "Luv Is Not Enough", and announced they had begun work on their third studio album, with its release planned to be by late 2020. The band toured on the back of the new singles with sold-out shows in both the US and Canada. A European tour was scheduled for April 2020; however, due to the onset of the COVID-19 pandemic, the tour was postponed to 2022. The tenth anniversary edition of Illumination was released on vinyl in 2020, and then digitally the following year.

The group's long-awaited third studio album, We Always Had Tomorrow, was released on 28 February 2025.

== Band members ==
Current live band members

- Benjamin Plant – production, synthesisers, bass
- Daniel Whitechurch – piano, synthesisers
- Rhythm Luna – drums
- Reva Devito – vocals
- TC Milan – vocals
- Nicholas Mulhall – guitar, vocals
- Tom Frazer - guitar
- Stan Bicknell - drums (fill in)

Former live and studio band members

- Aaron Shanahan – guitar, vocals
- Kosta Theodosis – drums
- Joshua Moriarty – guitars, vocals

== Discography ==
=== Studio albums ===
Title	Details	Peak chart positions
Title	Details	AUS
Illumination	Released: 20 August 2010; Label: EMI; Formats: CD, LP, digital download	10
All Possible Futures	Released: 7 April 2015; Label: Remote Control; Formats: CD, LP, digital download	65
We Always Had Tomorrow	Released: 28 February 2025; Label: Miami Horror, Nettwerk; Formats: CD, digital download	

=== Extended plays ===
Title	Details
Bravado	Released: 14 November 2008; Label: Virgin; Formats: CD, digital download
The Shapes	Released: 17 March 2017; Label: Self-released; Formats: CD, LP, digital download

=== Singles ===
Title	Year	Peak chart positions	Album
Title	Year	AUS	Album
"Sometimes"	2009	62	Illumination
"Moon Theory"	2010	—	Illumination
"I Look to You" (featuring Kimbra)	2010	—	Illumination
"Holidays" (featuring Alan Palomo)	2010	—	Illumination
"Summersun"	2011	—	Illumination
"Real Slow"	2013	—	All Possible Futures
"Colours in the Sky" (featuring Cleopold)	2013	—	All Possible Futures
"Wild Motion (Set It Free)"	2014	—	All Possible Futures
"Love Like Mine"	2015	—	All Possible Futures
"Cellophane (So Cruel)" (featuring Aaron Miller and Gavin Turek)	2016	—	All Possible Futures
"Stranger" (featuring Future Unlimited)	2016	—	All Possible Futures
"Leila"	2017	—	The Shapes
"Restless"	2019	—	Non-album singles
"Luv Is Not Enough"	2019	—	Non-album singles
"We're All Made of Stars" (featuring Angela Armstrong)	2025	—	We Always Had Tomorrow

=== Remixes ===
Title	Year	Artist
"Embrace (Fred Falke & Miami Horror Remix)"	2008	Pnau
"Empire Ants (Miami Horror Remix)"	2010	Gorillaz and Yukimi Nagano
"Wonderful (Miami Horror Remix)"	2013	Surahn
"Can't Stop (Miami Horror Remix)"	2015	Moullinex
"You Don't Get Me High Anymore (Miami Horror Remix)"	2017	Phantogram
"Getting There From Here (Miami Horror & Lazywax Remix)"	2020	Poolside, Todd Edwards, and Turbotito
"Holidays (Miami Horror & Cassian Remix)"	2020	Miami Horror
"LEMON SWAYZE (Miami Horror Lemonade Remix)"	2021	KUNZITE

== Awards and nominations ==
=== APRA Awards ===
The APRA Awards are presented annually from 1982 by the Australasian Performing Right Association (APRA), "honouring composers and songwriters". They commenced in 1982.

Year	Nominee / work	Award	Result	Ref.
2011	"Sometimes" (Benjamin Plant, Daniel Whitechurch, Joshua Heptinstall)	Dance Work of the Year	Nominated	

=== ARIA Music Awards ===
The ARIA Music Awards is an annual awards ceremony that recognises excellence, innovation, and achievement across all genres of Australian music.

Year	Nominee / work	Award	Result
2010	"Sometimes"	Best Dance Release	Nominated
2011	Illumination	Best Dance Release	Nominated
