= Yakkity Yak =

Animated television series

- Genre: Comedy; Slapstick
- Created by: Mark Gravas
- Developed by: Mark Gravas; Jono Howard; Blair Peters; Bradley Trevor Greive
- Directed by: J. Falconer (#1–6, 7B–11A, 12–26); Mark Gravas; Greg Sullivan (#7A, 11B)
- Creative director: Mark Gravas
- Voices of: Lee Tockar; Brian Drummond; Andrea Libman; Pam Hyatt; Ian James Corlett; Michael Daingerfield; Jason Schombing
- Composers: Hal Foxton Beckett; Michael Richard Plowman
- Countries of origin: Canada; Australia
- Original language: English
- No. of seasons: 1
- No. of episodes: 26 (52 segments)

Production
- Executive producers: Catherine Nebauer; Chris Bartleman; Tim Brooke-Hunt; Greg Ricca; Rob Simmons
- Producers: Kathy Antonsen Rocchio; Jamie Turner; Sandra Walters
- Running time: 22 minutes
- Production companies: Studio B Productions; Kapow Pictures; MTV Networks International

Original release
- Network: Teletoon (Canada); Nickelodeon (Australia and New Zealand)/Network Ten (Australia); Nickelodeon (USA) (United States)
- Release: 9 November 2002 – 12 December 2003

Yakkity Yak was an animated television series created by Mark Gravas for Nickelodeon. It was produced by Studio B Productions and Kapow Pictures. It aired on Teletoon (now Cartoon Network) in Canada and on the American version of Nickelodeon in the United States from 9 November 2002 until 12 December 2003. 26 episodes were produced.

The copyright to the show is shared between WildBrain, which bought Studio B Productions in 2007, and Kapow Pictures.

== Premise ==
The story focuses around an anthropomorphic yak named Yakkity who aspires to become a well-known comedian and his friends, Keo (an anthropomorphic pineapple) and Lemony (a young human girl) in the fictitious Australian town Onion Falls (based on Lithgow, New South Wales).

== Theme song ==
A modified version of the 1958 song Yakety Yak by The Coasters (in which children and some cast members sing some portions) is used as the show's theme song.

== Characters ==
- Yakkity Yak (Lee Tockar): A preteen yak student in Onion Falls High School and the school's mascot who wishes to be a comedian. Yakkity works as the school mascot since his grandfather also served as mascot when the (rugby) football team won the state championship in 1925. The football team, instead of the mascot, got all the glory (despite not winning a match in 77 years), much to Yakkity's distaste. Yakkity lives with his Granny and her boarder Professor Crazyhair. He wears a coat over his bare body. His best friends are Keo (who lives next door) and Lemony. Over the course of the series, his parents have never been seen or mentioned.
- Keo (Brian Drummond): A human with a pineapple for a head. He has a crush on Lemony, but she is oblivious to it. He is very intelligent, but is camera-shy and has stage fright. He has a rivalry with his father, who is only a pineapple, but deep down, he loves him.
- Lemony (Andrea Libman): A pretty blonde-haired human girl and Keo's love interest who has a vivid imagination.
- Reginald Highpants (Ian James Corlett): The town's leading vendor of candy and all things sugar. He also runs many small businesses.
- Trilo (Jason Schombing): Yakkity's trilobite agent and retired circus performer who owns his own Entertainment Agency, does children's parties for the characters, and is always looking for money. His clients are Yakkity, Fairy Wanda and Chuck Damage, who he uses for parties.
- Granny Yak (Pam Hyatt): Yakkity's grandmother. While she is a good sounding board in a parental way, she also has some of Yakkity's impulsive genes.
- Professor Crazyhair (Scott McNeil): A scientist and teacher at Onion Falls High whose hair changes colour like a mood ring, hence his name. He lives in Yakkity's basement, where he built a laboratory. His egg salad recipe is very sought after by evil geniuses who wish to use it to take over the world.
- Penelope (Tabitha St. Germain): A robot who is Lemony's best friend and works as Professor Crazyhair's assistant but lacks any social skills or confidence. Whenever she's embarrassed, her face turns red and she squirts out fire fighting foams from her arms transforming into fire hoses, squirting everything around her.
- Rondo (Ian James Corlett): Lemony's (rugby) football-playing older brother who is a senior in high school. He is one of Yakkity's enemies often competing for the spotlight.
- Keo's Dad (Michael Daingerfield): A pineapple who can be bossy and rude at many times, and Keo's father. The identity of his wife (Keo's mother) is unknown and never explored; it can be assumed that they're divorced or she died before the events of Yakkity Yak. He's only a disembodied pineapple head; as the only time he ever had a body with limbs was in "My Dad the Robot".
- Wanda Harper (Brenda Crichlow): an African-Australian fairy who works as Onion Falls High's librarian.
- Jackie Pachyderm: An elephant comedian and successful movie star who is Yakkity's idol.
- Gary (Terry Klassen): The short, evil, mean-spirited, sadistic, bad-tempered arch-enemy of Yakkity. He tried to steal Professor Crazyhair's egg salad to take over Onion Falls. He hates Yakkity because he once again interfered in his plans and decides to use the giant robot to destroy Onion Falls.

== Broadcast ==
MTV Networks International held worldwide distribution and merchandising rights to the series, except in the show's home countries of Canada and Australia.

Yakkity Yak first premiered on Teletoon in Canada on 4 January 2003, with the final episode's airing on 28 January 2004. It also aired on BBC Kids. In the United Kingdom, it aired on Nickelodeon. In Italy, it previously aired on Nickelodeon and Canale 21. In Australia, it aired on Nickelodeon and Network 10, and would later air on ABC. In the US, it briefly aired on Nickelodeon, from 9 November 2003 to 4 September 2004. It was later run on the Nicktoons channel starting from 22 May 2004 until 23 September 2007. The show also aired on Nickelodeon in Latin America and Europe.

== Episodes ==
The episode list is listed by production code, not by airdate.

No.	Title	Written by	Storyboarded by	Original release date	U.S. release date
1	"Hypnotic Yak"	Dennis Heaton	Tim Pyman	9 November 2002	24 November 2003 (Nickelodeon)
1	"As the Worm Turns"	Story by : J. Falconer & Greg Sullivan; Teleplay by : Steve Sullivan	Steve Moltzen	9 November 2002	24 November 2003 (Nickelodeon)
Yakkity hypnotises everyone into thinking he's funny. Yakkity finds a magical talking ventriloquist dummy.
2	"The Yak and the Hat"	Steve Sullivan	Daniel Foley	2002	9 November 2003 (Nickelodeon)
2	"Cowinator"	Paul Greenberg	Mike Zarb	2002	9 November 2003 (Nickelodeon)
Yakkity goes on a TV quiz show with Keo providing answers from within Yakkity's hat. An historic grass-eating competition between Yakkity's grandfather and "The Cowinator" is replayed between Yakkity and the grandson of "The Cowinator".
3	"3 Cheers for Penelope"	Steve Sullivan	Murray Debus	2002	9 November 2003 (Nickelodeon)
3	"My Dad the Robot"	Richard Elliott & Simon Racioppa	Chris Hauge	2002	9 November 2003 (Nickelodeon)
When Professor Crazyhair makes a robot girl, Lemony coaches her to improve her social skills. Professor Crazyhair builds robot legs and arms for Keo's father.
4	"A Tree Grows in Onion Falls"	Story by : J. Falconer & Blair Peters; Teleplay by : Dennis Heaton	Russ Crispin	2002	25 November 2003 (Nickelodeon)
4	"Spring Cleaning"	Alan Levin	Simon O'Leary	2002	25 November 2003 (Nickelodeon)
Yakkity moves out of home and into a treehouse. But now he must save his family from a thief masquerading as a little boy. Yakkity and Keo makes a mess in Professor Crazyhair's laboratory, and so must do some house cleaning to make amends. But soon, they turn everyone into zombies.
5	"Dial-a-Yak"	Daegan Fryklind	Mike Zarb	2002	1 December 2003 (Nickelodeon)
5	"Darn-It Dog"	Story by : Stu Connolly & Vito Viscomi; Teleplay by : Jono Howard	Steve Moltzen	2002	1 December 2003 (Nickelodeon)
Yakkity gets grounded after getting home late again, and has to wear a phone on his back as punishment. Later, he breaks Rondo's robot, which he was going to bring to the Bot Beatdown event. Rondo then decides to bring Yakkity as his robot instead, but it ends up putting Yakkity in danger until Granny Yak finds out and helps him out. Yakkity does not want to return a library book he borrowed when he was 5. So he tells Wanda he never took it out. Soon, he uses lying to get what he wants at least until he gets a taste of his own medicine.
6	"Yakstravaganza"	Story by : Greg Sullivan & J. Falconer; Teleplay by : Steve Sullivan	Andy Bartlett	2002	2 December 2003 (Nickelodeon)
6	"Curly Top"	Story by : Greg Sullivan; Teleplay by : Jono Howard	Arthur Filloy	2002	2 December 2003 (Nickelodeon)
Yakkity encourages Keo's father to relive his showbiz days and join his new show. Granny Yak gives Yakkity a pink perm. However, it ends becoming alive and drinking up all of Onion Falls's water.
7	"I Want My Yak TV"	Steve Sullivan	Mike Zarb	2002	3 December 2003 (Nickelodeon)
7	"Election Dysfunction"	Kevin White	Simon O'Leary	2002	3 December 2003 (Nickelodeon)
Yakkity's new antler braces start picking up cable TV channels - a rare feat in Onion Falls. Yakkity becomes a popular stage act. Keo runs against Lemony for school president, but will he promise more than he can deliver?
8	"And That's the Weather"	Story by : Terry Saltsman & Greg Sullivan; Teleplay by : Terry Saltsman	Mike Zarb	2002	4 December 2003 (Nickelodeon)
8	"Pineapple Upside-Dead Cake!"	Story by : Greg Sullivan; Teleplay by : Dennis Heaton	Rob Boutilier	2002	4 December 2003 (Nickelodeon)
Yakkity becomes an accurate weather forecaster thanks to Granny Yak's weather-predicting bunions. Complications arise, however, when Granny has her bunions removed. When Keo's father goes missing and everyone starts acting odd, Yakkity thinks that aliens have taken them.
9	"A Yak and His Fish"	Story by : Greg Sullivan; Teleplay by : Dennis Heaton	Stephane Portal	2002	5 December 2003 (Nickelodeon)
9	"Regarding Chuck"	Story by : Paul Greenberg; Teleplay by : Vito Viscomi & Darrell Vickers	Steve Moltzen	2002	5 December 2003 (Nickelodeon)
Yakkity's new pet fish likes to eat a variety of foods. Yakkity accidentally gives Chuck Damage amnesia.
10	"Double Double Oil and Trouble"	Story by : Stu Connolly & Vito Viscomi; Teleplay by : Steve Sullivan	Mike Zarb	2002	8 December 2003 (Nickelodeon)
10	"High Fashion Yak"	Story by : J. Falconer & Greg Sullivan; Teleplay by : Paul Greenberg	Mike Zarb	2002	8 December 2003 (Nickelodeon)
In a school project, Yakkity and friends try to improve the odor in Onion Falls. Yakkity and Keo become fashion gurus thanks to Granny Yak's knitting skills.
11	"Nerds Are People Too"	Story by : Stu Connolly; Teleplay by : Alan Levin	Tim Pyman	2002	9 November 2003 (Nickelodeon)
11	"The 10% Solution"	Ian Boothby	Russ Crispin	2002	9 November 2003 (Nickelodeon)
Yakkity unexpectedly excels in a test and is invited to a camp for teenage geniuses. But this is all a trap by Gary. Yakkity found out that Gary was his old arch-nemesis. Gary tells Yakkity that he has interfered for the last time, and he decides to use his Giant Robot to destroy Onion Falls. Once Gary activates the Robot, the giant robot does a comedy routine and uses Gary as a microphone to entertain Yakkity, Keo, Penelope, and Stats. Unfortunately, the Robot crashes along with Gary and Gary is now arrested saying "I would've gotten away with it too, if it wasn't for that meddling yak." This is a Scooby-Doo reference. When times get tough, Yakkity's agent Trilo claims 10% ... of everything Yakkity receives which is everything in his life.
12	"National Day of Yakking"	Paul Greenberg	Mike Zarb	2002	11 December 2003 (Nickelodeon)
12	"Fairy Yakkity"	Story by : Stu Connolly; Teleplay by : Kevin White	Simon O'Leary	2002	11 December 2003 (Nickelodeon)
It is the Onion Falls' centenary and a parade is announced. Yakkity would like a float built to celebrate his idol - comedian Jackie Pachyderm. After Trilo asks Yakkity to disguise himself as Fairy Wanda, Rondo finds 'Victoria' strangely attractive.
13	"3 Minutes and Funny"	Story by : Stu Connolly; Teleplay by : Jono Howard	Mike Zarb	2002	9 November 2003 (Nickelodeon)
13	"Nature Calls"	Story by : Blair Peters & Ian Weir; Teleplay by : Vito Viscomi & Ian Weir	Marlon Dean	2002	9 November 2003 (Nickelodeon)
The people of Onion Falls partake in a video competition where the most popular video featuring an onion will win. Yakkity favors a comedic genre. Keo and Lemony are concerned when Yakkity starts behaving oddly. Has it something to do with the pimple on his nose?
14	"Fount Onion"	Steve Sullivan	Tim Pyman	TBA	28 May 2006 (Nicktoons Network)
14	"Ice Scream, You Scream"	Story by : Vito Viscomi; Teleplay by : Steve Sullivan	Stephane Portal	TBA	28 May 2006 (Nicktoons Network)
Keo reveals Yakkity's secret swimming hole. Yakkity becomes a bike-riding ice cream salesman. But he starts eating all the merchandise (which counts as stealing) in order to get free stuff.
15	"Cabin Fever"	Story by : Paul Greenberg; Teleplay by : Kevin White	Steve Moltzen	TBA	11 June 2006 (Nicktoons Network)
15	"Due Back Tomorrow"	Story by : Mark Gravas & Stu Connolly; Teleplay by : Steve Sullivan	Greg Ingram	TBA	11 June 2006 (Nicktoons Network)
Keo, Keo's father and Yakkity go camping, but seem to forget to pack vital items. At least Yakkity brings some marshmallows. Keo and Yakkity find work in a video shop. Yakkity recommends all of Jackie Pachyderm's funny films, except for A-Pach-Alypse Now.
16	"End of the Line"	Daegan Fryklind	Rob Boutilier	TBA	18 June 2006 (Nicktoons Network)
16	"House Sitters"	Story by : Kevin White; Teleplay by : Paul Greenberg	Junko Aoyama	TBA	18 June 2006 (Nicktoons Network)
A nature documentary explains that yaks are an endangered species. Keo and Lemony must place Yakkity and his grandmother inside a glass bubble in order to save them. Mr Highpants must attend a Confectionery Convention. He asks Yakkity and Keo to look after his hi-tech home, warning the boys not to touch any buttons ... and only to feed Mr Littlepants "Chimp-Chow".
17	"Teachers Pet"	Story by : Kevin White; Teleplay by : Steve Sullivan	Greg Ingram	TBA	25 June 2006 (Nicktoons Network)
17	"Yakeo"	Story by : J. Falconer & Greg Sullivan; Teleplay by : Steve Sullivan	Daniel Foley	TBA	25 June 2006 (Nicktoons Network)
Professor Crazyhair gives Lemony a high grade for her science project, but Keo believes that flattery had a lot to do with it. Note: The title was previously known as "The Yakking". After failing to be picked for the football team, Yakkity and Keo invent their own sport.
18	"Sharing Bear"	Story by : Greg Sullivan; Teleplay by : Steve Sullivan	Chris Hauge	TBA	Unaired
18	"Lucky Undies"	Steve Sullivan	Mike Zarb	TBA	Unaired
Yakkity still loves Sharing Bear - the children's TV presenter, but Keo and Lemony think he is for babies. Everything is going right for Yakkity. Is it because of the underpants he has been wearing since last Tuesday?
19	"Techno Prisoners"	Steve Sullivan	Tim Pyman	TBA	16 July 2006 (Nicktoons Network)
19	"It's a So-So Life"	Story by : Terry Saltsman; Teleplay by : Vito Viscomi & Terry Saltsman	Greg Ingram	TBA	16 July 2006 (Nicktoons Network)
When Grandma Yak turns against modern conveniences, Yakkity has to sneak off to the Techno-seum with his science class. Yakkity leaves the services of Trilo to pursue a career as a headline act in the Circus Maximus.
20	"Camp Onion"	Story by : Stu Connolly & Vito Viscomi; Teleplay by : Paul Greenberg	Stephane Portal	TBA	30 July 2006 (Nicktoons Network)
20	"Snow Biz"	Jono Howard	Steve Moltzen	TBA	30 July 2006 (Nicktoons Network)
The Onioneers are on winter camp, and Lemony is hoping to win all of the merit medals. But she and Mr. Highpants get stuck on top of Mt. Onion. Now Yakkity, Keo and Wanda must save them. It is All Onions Eve, and the children of Onion Falls are getting ready to leave their boots of onion soup out over night for the Snow Cow to replace with chocolate milk. However Yakkity's friends no longer believe in the Snow Cow...
21	"The Fan"	Richard Elliott & Simon Racioppa	Mike Zarb	TBA	13 August 2006 (Nicktoons Network)
21	"From Boom to Bust"	Jono Howard	Stephane Portal	TBA	13 August 2006 (Nicktoons Network)
Yakkity's cousin Jasper is a cute yak with a natural stand-up comedy style. But Yakkity becomes envious and ruins Jasper's show. When Professor Crazyhair's experiments in the basement blow up the dining room a second time, Granny Yak evicts him from the house.
22	"Rondo Reversal"	Story by : Stu Connolly; Teleplay by : Steve Sullivan	Simon O'Leary	TBA	20 August 2006 (Nicktoons Network)
22	"The Damage is Done"	Vito Viscomi	Simon O'Leary	TBA	20 August 2006 (Nicktoons Network)
Granny Yak is having surgery done on her antlers and Keo has Pineapple Pox, so Yakkity has a sleepover at Lemony's place. There he discovers some embarrassing secrets about Lemony's brother Rondo. When he reveals all at school, Yakkity unintentionally assumes the position of the school bully. This soon causes everything to be out of whack. When Chuck Damage becomes Yakkity's personal trainer, Yakkity begins to use him as his body guard. However how will Chuck Damage fare against The Cement Mixer?
23	"My Fair Crazy Hair"	Story by : Greg Sullivan; Teleplay by : Dennis Heaton	Daniel Foley	TBA	27 August 2006 (Nicktoons Network)
23	"Practically Funny"	Story by : Mark Gravas & Stu Connolly; Teleplay by : Steve Sullivan	Mike Zarb	TBA	27 August 2006 (Nicktoons Network)
Granny Yak has a new boyfriend - Chatterbox Ox, but Yakkity is suspicious, and Professor Crazyhair tries to win back Granny's affections. Things go wild in Onion Falls after Yakkity receives the Jackie Pachyderm Practical Joke box, but someone else knows a few good practical jokes.
24	"Onion Falls Most Wanted"	Story by : Mark Gravas & Stu Connolly; Teleplay by : Steve Sullivan	Roger Clarke	TBA	Unaired
24	"Blue Rinse Test"	Story by : Stu Connolly; Teleplay by : Steve Sullivan	Chris Hauge	TBA	Unaired
A robber is stealing from homes by blowing bubblegum bubbles and floating up to upstairs windows. Trilo is suspected, but is he really the Bubblegum Bandit? When Granny Yak moves to a nursing home, Yakkity moves in with her.
25	"Daddy Uh-Oh"	Story by : Mark Gravas & Stu Connolly; Teleplay by : Jono Howard	Steve Moltzen	TBA	8 September 2007 (Nicktoons Network)
25	"Yaks a Plenty"	Story by : Mark Gravas & Stu Connolly; Teleplay by : Steve Sullivan	Suzanne White	TBA	8 September 2007 (Nicktoons Network)
Keo is embarrassed by his old bike, but his father won't let him spend his film school money on a new one. With poor finances, will the family have to move to freezing Bergville? Yakkity keeps putting off study for a biology test due the next day. However, an educational animation video featuring Alan Amoeba helps teach Yakkity about cellular replication.
26	"Home School"	Story by : Kevin White; Teleplay by : Steve Sullivan	Murray Debus & Chris Hauge	12 December 2003	3 September 2006 (Nicktoons Network)
26	"The Onion Falls 500"	Story by : Vito Viscomi; Teleplay by : Dennis Heaton	Steve Moltzen	12 December 2003	3 September 2006 (Nicktoons Network)
Yakkity and Keo leave school to be taught by Keo's father. A soapbox race is announced, and the prize is a year's supply of Professor Crazyhair's Egg Salad. When Lemony forms a team with Keo, Yakkity eventually pairs with a peculiar new neighbour. The inclusion of an egg salad recipe is a tribute to Woody Allen's What's Up, Tiger Lily?

== Awards ==
The show was nominated for a Leo Award for "Best Musical Score" in 2004.
