= The Lord's Garden =

Anglo-Australian music group

- Members: Peter Hemsley; Craig Sunderland

The Lord's Garden is a band formed by Peter Hemsley from Sydney and Craig Sunderland in England Both were members of Solstice. Their double album Journeys was nominated for the 1997 ARIA Award for Best Dance Release.

== Band members ==
- Peter Hemsley
- Craig Sunderland

== Discography ==
=== Studio albums ===
List of studio albums, with selected details
Title	Album details
Ambi Dub One	Released: 1995; Label: Shock Records (AMBI DUB 001); Formats: CD
Journeys	Released: 1996; Label: ACML (486549 2); Formats: 2× CD

== Awards ==
=== ARIA Music Awards ===
The ARIA Music Awards is an annual awards ceremony that recognises excellence, innovation, and achievement across all genres of Australian music. They commenced in 1987. The Lord's Garden were nominated for one award.

Year	Nominee / work	Award	Result
1997	Journey	Best Dance Release	Nominated
