= Chili Hi Fly =

Australian music collective

Chili Hi Fly are a collective of singers, musicians and producers from Sydney, Australia, put together by Simon Lewicki (a.k.a. Groove Terminator) and Noel Burgess. Their disco-inspired track "Is It Love?" (which featured samples from a 1980s Kool & the Gang song, "Be My Lady") peaked at number 57 on the ARIA Charts in 1998. It went to number 1 on the US Billboard Hot Dance Music/Club Play chart in 2001. The same track peaked at number 37 on the UK Singles Chart in March 2000.

In 2015, "Is It Love" was listed at number 30 in the Mix's '100 Greatest Australian Dance Tracks of All Time' with Jody Macgregor saying "They warped and stuttered the original as if it had been altered by its travel through time, mutated into some new shape and then let loose to monster the dancefloors of the 21st century".

They also had a follow-up, "It's Alright", peaking at number 22 on the US Hot Dance Music/Club Play chart that same year.

== Discography ==
=== Singles ===
List of singles, with selected chart positions
| Title | Year | Peak chart positions | | |
| Title | Year | AUS | UK | US Dance Music/Club Play |
|---|---|---|---|---|
| "Is It Love?" | 1998 | 57 | 37 | 1 |
| "It's Alright" | 2002 | 95 | — | 22 |
| "I Go Crazy" (featuring Jonas) | 2009 | — | — | — |
| "Higher Ground" (with Olsen) | 2018 | — | — | — |

== Awards ==
=== ARIA Music Awards ===
The ARIA Music Awards is an annual awards ceremony that recognises excellence, innovation, and achievement across all genres of Australian music. They commenced in 1987. Chili Hi Fly were nominated for one award.

| Year | Nominee / work | Award | Result |
|---|---|---|---|
| 2000 | "Is It Love?" | Best Dance Release | Nominated |

== See also ==
- List of number-one dance hits (United States)
- List of artists who reached number one on the US Dance chart
