= Kyle Watson =

South African DJ and music producer

- Born: Kyle Watson; Johannesburg, South Africa
- Origin: Gauteng, South Africa
- Genres: House; EDM; deep house; techno
- Occupations: Record producer; DJ
- Instruments: Keyboards; sampler; percussion; synthesizer
- Years active: 2007–present
- Website: kylewatsonmusic.com

Kyle Watson is a South African music producer and DJ. He creates house music containing elements of Electronic dance, Deep house and Techno.

== Early life ==
Kyle Watson was born in Johannesburg, South Africa. He studied music and played the piano when he was young and was influenced into making music due to his father being involved in the music industry.

== Career ==
Kyle Watson began his career in 2007 with his first release. In 2017, he was nominated in the Dance Music Awards South Africa 2017, for Best producer and Best Male DJ. He began touring the United States in 2018, launching his 11-date New Ground Tour with a performance on The Palms stage at CRSSD. That same year, he released his debut album Into the Morning. Explaining his album:

Into The Morning is a pretty eclectic album for me. I played around in a few genres different to what people might usually expect, and this little mini mix of the album tracks should whet your appetite and hopefully get you excited for the whole package to drop!

Shortly after the album release, he launched his "Into the Morning" tour in the US to promote the album. The tour started in October, and included different regions in the United States. His music has appeared on major dance labels including Ultra Music, Atlantic Records, Dirtybird Records and This Ain't Bristol. He has remixed for artists including Rudimental, Zhu and Oliver Heldens.

In 2019, he released his EP titled Landmine. Later that same year, he collaborated with Australian producer Stace Cadet on his single, Safe which was released on Parametric Records.

In 2020, he released his single The Ratchet Express which featured DJ duo The Sponges. His EP titled Major Games was signed by Diplo and released on his label Higher Ground and his single My Level was signed to Gorgon City’s imprint REALM. In that same year, he also released his single I Got You which featured Apple Gule and released through Universal Music NL and collaborated with warner case on I Don't Like Anyone for Spinnin' Deep.

He has performed at Ultra South Africa He has toured and performed in Brazil and the United States and has also featured at music festivals and venues such as Corona Sunsets Festival in Cape Town, The Lab Johannesburg, Electric Forest, San Diego's CRSSD Fest, Shambhala Music Festival, and the Dirtybird Campout in San Francisco. He was also set to perform at the 2020 Coachella but due to the COVID-19 outbreak, the event was rescheduled to 2021.

He is also one of the founders of the record label Box Of Cats which was launched in 2016 alongside Wongo, Jeff Doubleu, Tom EQ, Jak Z and Marc Spence.

== Awards and nominations ==
Year	Award ceremony	Prize	Result
2017	Dance Music Awards South Africa	Best Producer	Nominated
2017	Dance Music Awards South Africa	Best Male DJ	Nominated

== Discography ==
- Doubting You (2009)
- Canned Music/I Don't Mind (2011)
- Detuned EP (2013)
- Throwback EP (2013)
- 35 Miles EP (2014)
- Cymbal Play EP (2015)
- Watermelons/Fly With Me (2015)
- Marshmallows EP (2016)
- Rhinoceros/The Cone EP (2016)
- Road Trips EP (2017)
- Pop Up/Camouflage Cat EP (2018)
- Into The Morning (2018)
- Landmine/The Sample EP (2019)
- Major Games/Radiate EP (2020)
- The Core EP (2021)

== Tours ==
- Brazil Tour 2018
- The New Ground Tour
- The New Ground Tour 2.0
- Into The Morning USA
- Into The Morning South Africa
- Australasia 2018
- Brazil 2019
- USA Summer ‘19
