= Cam Farrar =

Australian DJ and producer

Cam Farrar is an Australian DJ and producer who also goes by the name Kikumoto Allstars. He released his debut single "Wasted" in 2003, which peaked at number 46 on the ARIA Charts and reached number 1 on ARIA's dance charts. "Wasted" was nominated for the Best Dance Release and the 2004 ARIA Awards.

== Discography ==
=== Singles ===
List of singles, with selected Australian positions
Title	Year	Peak chart positions
Title	Year	AUS
"Wasted"	2003	46
"Tribal Beats" (as Neurotic Jock vs. Cam Denny)	2004	-

== Awards ==
=== ARIA Music Awards ===
The ARIA Music Awards is an annual awards ceremony that recognises excellence, innovation, and achievement across all genres of Australian music. They commenced in 1987. Cam Farrar was nominated for one award.

Year	Nominee / work	Award	Result
2004	"Wasted"	Best Dance Release	Nominated
