= Girls Can Be Cruel =

- Australian CD single cover

Single by Infusion

from the album Six Feet Above Yesterday
- Released: 19 April 2004
- Label: BMG Australia
- Songwriter(s): Manuel Sharrad, Jamie Stevens, Frank Xavier
- Producer(s): Manuel Sharrad, Jamie Stevens, Frank Xavier

Infusion singles chronology
"Dead Souls" / "Troika" (2003)	"Girls Can Be Cruel" (2004)	"Better World" (2004)

"Girls Can Be Cruel" is a song made by Australian electronica group, Infusion. The song was released on April 19, 2004 as the lead single from the group's second studio album, Six Feet Above Yesterday. The song peaked at number 52 on the ARIA Charts.

At the ARIA Music Awards of 2004, the song won the ARIA Award for Best Dance Release.

== Track listings ==
Australian CD single (82876609172)
No.	Title	Length
1.	"Girls Can Be Cruel" (Radio edit)	2:58
2.	"Girls Can Be Cruel" (Original mix)	7:03
3.	"Girls Can Be Cruel" (Infusion sQ'ed mix)	9:26
4.	"Girls Can Be Cruel" (CD_ROM)	3:00

Italy 12" Vinyl single (MTR2222)
No.	Title	Length
1.	"Girls Can Be Cruel" (Mantra All Stars re-edit)	7:22
2.	"Girls Can Be Cruel" (Alex Dolby 'Psiko Girls Can Be Cruel In The Garden' remix)	8:09

UK 12" Vinyl single (AT004)
No.	Title	Length
1.	"Girls Can Be Cruel" (Radio edit)	2:58
2.	"Girls Can Be Cruel" (Infusion sQ'ed mix)	9:26

UK 12" Vinyl remix single (AT016X)
No.	Title	Length
1.	"Girls Can Be Cruel" (Dylan Rhymes remix)	7:08
2.	"Girls Can Be Cruel" (Dylan Rhymes dub)
3.	"Girls Can Be Cruel" (King Unique remix)

UK CD Maxi
No.	Title	Length
1.	"Girls Can Be Cruel" (Radio edit)	3:02
2.	"Girls Can Be Cruel" (Dylan Rhymes remix)	7:08
3.	"Girls Can Be Cruel" (King Unique remix)	8:35
4.	"Girls Can Be Cruel" (King Unique Danger dub)	6:59
5.	"Girls Can Be Cruel" (Alex Dolby 'Psiko Girls Can Be Cruel In The Garden' remix)	8:03

== Charts ==
Chart (2004)	Peak position
Australia (ARIA Charts)	52

== Release history ==
Region	Date	Format	Label	Catalogue
Australia	April 2004	CD Single	BMG Australia	82876609172
UK	2004	Vinyl 12" single	Audio Therapy	AT004
Italy	February 2005	Vinyl 12" single	Mantra Vibes	MTR2222
UK	March 2005	Vinyl 12" remixes	Audio Therapy	AT016X
UK	April 2005	CD Maxi single	Deconstruction Records	8287669186-2
