= Frontside (Australian band) =

Frontside is an Australian electronic music group composed of Chris Arkley-Smith and Scott Simon. It was formed in 1995.

The Frontside single "Dammerung" / "Mind Distortion" was nominated for the 1998 ARIA Award for Best Dance Release. They released their self titled debut album in 1998.

== Discography ==
=== Studio albums ===
List of albums, with selected chart positions
Title	Album details	Peak chart positions
Title	Album details	AUS
Frontside	Released: August 1998; Label: Abducted (ABD002CD); Formats: CD	140

=== Singles ===
List of singles, with selected chart positions
Title	Year	Chart positions	Album
Title	Year	AUS	Album
"Dämmerung"	1997	160	Frontside
"L.B.P."	1998	—	Frontside

== Awards ==
=== ARIA Music Awards ===
The ARIA Music Awards is an annual awards ceremony that recognises excellence, innovation, and achievement across all genres of Australian music. They commenced in 1987. Frontside were nominated for one award.

Year	Nominee / work	Award	Result
1998	"Dammerung" / "Mind Distortion"	Best Dance Release	Nominated
