= Bravado (EP) =

EP by Miami Horror
- Released: 14 November 2008
- Genre: Synthpop
- Length: 21:40
- Label: Virgin
- Producer: Benjamin Plant

Miami Horror chronology
Bravado (2008)	Illumination (2010)

Bravado is the debut EP by Australian electronic band Miami Horror. Released on 14 November 2008 by Virgin Records, it was produced solely by member Benjamin Plant, as the band had only consisted of him at the time. The track "Don't Be On with Her" received a music video, released on 11 November 2008. "Make You Mine" features guest vocals from Alan Palomo, frontman of the band Neon Indian, who would later collaborate with Miami Horror again on Illumination.

Additionally, a five-track remix EP titled Bravado Remixes was later digitally released on 21 July 2009.

== Track listing ==
No.	Title	Length
1.	"Don't Be On with Her"	3:42
2.	"Summerfest '86"	3:50
3.	"Make You Mine"	4:13
4.	"Bellevue"	2:50
5.	"Illumination"	7:05

iTunes bonus tracks
No.	Title	Length
6.	"Don't Be On with Her" (instrumental)	3:49
7.	"Make You Mine" (instrumental)	4:11

== Bravado Remixes ==
No.	Title	Length
1.	"Don't Be On With Her (Treasure Fingers Remix)"	5:01
2.	"Don't Be On With Her (Cyndi Seui Remix)"	4:09
3.	"Make You Mine (Fred Falke Remix)"	7:15
4.	"Make You Mine (Cassian Remix)"	4:41
5.	"Make You Mine (Death Metal Disco Scene Remix)"	3:31

== Charts ==
Chart performance for Bravado
Chart (2008–2009)	Peak position
Australia Physical Singles (ARIA)	10
