= Massaka (rapper) =

Turkish rapper

- Born: Murat İlhan; 25 October 1984 (age 41); Kreuzberg, West Berlin, West Germany
- Genres: Hip hop; Gangsta rap
- Occupations: Rapper; singer; songwriter
- Years active: 2002–present

Murat İlhan (born 25 October 1984), known professionally as Massaka, is a Turkish rapper, singer and songwriter. He is also known by his song "3 Kings" with Snoop Dogg. Massaka is originally from Trabzon. He is one of the leading figures in Turkish gangster rap. Having been part of street gangs since his childhood in Berlin, Massaka was also detained by Turkish authorities in 2025 for "glorifying crime and criminals", and later released.

== Discography ==
- 36 Night Crime (2005)
- Blutbeton (with Monstar361) (2007)
- Dämmerung (with Monstar361) (2010)
- Das Ritual (2011)
- Blutbeton 2 (with Monstar361) (2012)
- Istila (with Kodes) (2016)
- Siyah (2018)
- Flashback (2018)
- Syndikat (with Monstar361) (2019)
