= Let It Ride (Sgt Slick song) =

Single by Sgt Slick
- Released: July 2001
- Length: 3:24
- Label: Vicious Grooves
- Songwriter(s): Andrew Ramanauskas, Cheyne Coates, Marc Cerrone, Raymond Donnez
- Producer(s): Sgt. Slick

Sgt Slick singles chronology
"White Treble, Black Bass" (1998)	"Let It Ride" (2001)	"Don't Touch" (2003)

"Let It Ride" is a song by Australian house and electronic music DJ producer, Sgt Slick and released in July 2001, peaking at number 95 in Australia.

At the ARIA Music Awards of 2001, the song was nominated for Best Dance Release. At the APRA Music Awards of 2002, the song was nominated for Most Performed Dance Work.

== Track listings ==
Australian CD Single (VG12009CD)
No.	Title	Length
1.	"Let It Ride" (Original mix - edit)	3:24
2.	"Let It Ride" (Andy Van's Melbourne Remix)	7:15
3.	"Forever Disco" (Original mix)	5:44
4.	"Let It Ride" (Mobin Master Dub remix)	5:50
5.	"Let It Ride" (Original mix - 12" version)	6:30

== Charts ==
Chart (2001)	Peak position
Australia (ARIA)	95
