= Illumination (Miami Horror album) =

Studio album by Miami Horror
- Released: 20 August 2010
- Genre: Synth-pop; indietronica; nu-disco; house
- Length: 50:23
- Label: EMI
- Producer: Benjamin Plant

Miami Horror chronology
Bravado (2008)	Illumination (2010)	All Possible Futures (2015)

Singles from Illumination
- 1. "Sometimes" Released: 30 October 2009; 2. "Moon Theory" Released: 16 April 2010; 3. "I Look to You" Released: 30 July 2010; 4. "Holidays" Released: 10 December 2010; 5. "Summersun" Released: 15 April 2011

Illumination is the debut studio album by Australian electronic music band Miami Horror. It was released on 20 August 2010 by EMI. It features guest appearances from Neon Indian and Kimbra. The album was nominated for Best Dance Release at the ARIA Music Awards of 2011, but lost out to Cut Copy's Zonoscope.

== Track listing ==
All tracks are written by Miami Horror, except where noted.

No.	Title	Writer(s)	Length
1.	"Infinite Canyons"		2:08
2.	"I Look to You" (featuring Kimbra)	Miami Horror; Tim Derricourt; Mario Banks; Gregory Smith	3:53
3.	"Holidays" (featuring Alan Palomo)	Miami Horror; Palomo; Luther Vandross	4:27
4.	"Summersun"		5:27
5.	"Sometimes"		4:13
6.	"Moon Theory"		4:22
7.	"Echoplex" (featuring MAI)	Miami Horror; MAI	4:26
8.	"Imagination"		5:08
9.	"Grand Illusion"		2:32
10.	"Soft Light" (featuring Alan Palomo)	Miami Horror; Palomo	4:53
11.	"Illuminated"		2:56
12.	"Ultraviolet" (featuring Alan Palomo)	Miami Horror; Palomo	3:58

Australian iTunes Store bonus tracks
No.	Title	Length
13.	"Lucid Stream"	27:47
14.	"Versailles"	4:07

Japanese edition bonus tracks
No.	Title	Length
13.	"Sometimes" (Gloves Mix)	6:56
14.	"I Look to You" (Lucid Stream Remix) (featuring Kimbra)	6:09
15.	"Holidays" (Jamaica Remix) (featuring Alan Palomo)	4:38

Limited edition bonus disc
No.	Title	Length
1.	"Moon Theory" (Punks Jump Up Remix)	4:53
2.	"Make You Mine" (Fred Falke Remix)	7:14
3.	"Sometimes" (Gloves Extended Mix)	6:56
4.	"Don't Be On with Her" (Treasure Fingers Remix)	5:01
5.	"Moon Theory" (Yacht Remix)	5:03
6.	"Sometimes" (Shazam Remix)	6:52
7.	"Moon Theory" (Sam La More Remix)	6:18
8.	"Sometimes" (Hook N Sling Remix)	6:26
9.	"Make You Mine" (Death Metal Disco Scene Remix)	5:10
10.	"Moon Theory" (Baby Monster Remix)	4:25

Notes

- "Holidays" contains a sample from "Sugar and Spice (I Found Me a Girl)" by Luther Vandross.

== Charts ==
=== Weekly charts ===
Chart (2010)	Peak position
Australian Albums (ARIA)	10
Australian Dance Albums (ARIA)	2

=== Year-end charts ===
Chart (2010)	Position
Australian Dance Albums (ARIA)	32

== Release history ==
Region	Date	Label
Australia	20 August 2010	EMI
Japan	26 January 2011	EMI
Germany	29 April 2011	EMI
