= Infusion (band) =

Australian electronica band

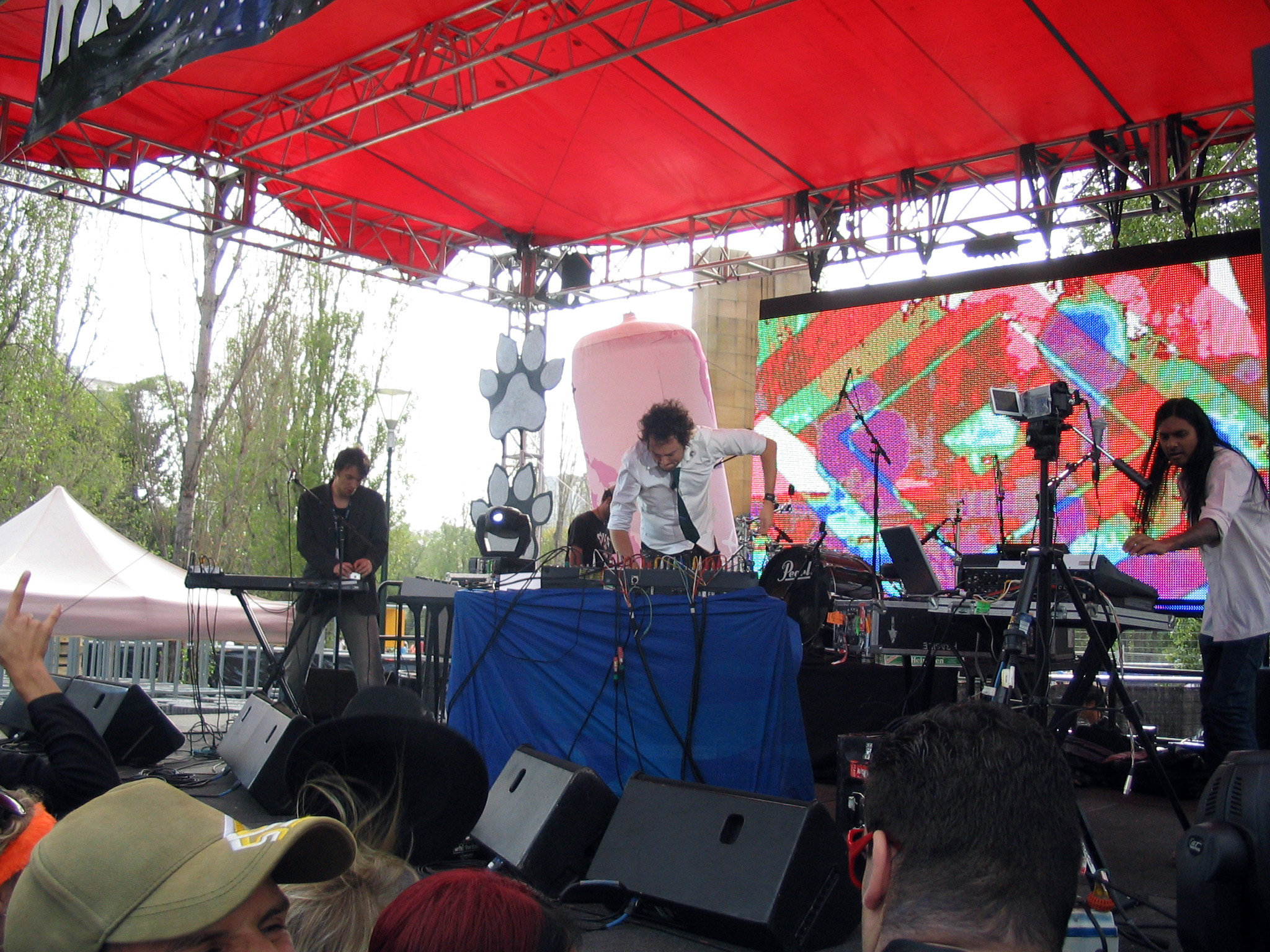
- Infusion in Melbourne in 2007

Background information
- Origin: Wollongong, New South Wales, Australia
- Genres: Electronica, electronic rock, alternative dance, house
- Years active: 1995–2013, 2019
- Labels: Futuresque
- Past members: Manuel Sharrad; Jamie Stevens; Frank Xavier; Ben Askins

Infusion was an Australian electronica band, originally from Wollongong which formed in 1995. It is best known for its ARIA Music Award-winning song "Girls Can Be Cruel" and Six Feet Above Yesterday.

== Career ==
=== 1995-2002: Early Days and Phrases and Numbers ===
Infusion founding members, Jamie Stevens and Manuel Sharrad, met in 1988 at a local high school in Wollongong. Frank Xavier also hails from Wollongong, although he did not meet the other two until they had relocated to Sydney.

In 1995, Infusion released its debut single "Smokescreen / Lux" on the Dance Pool label while primarily remixing other artists' tracks.

In 1999, he band signed with Thunk Records, an underground electronic label and released its debut studio album, Phrases and Numbers, in 2000. The trio's music evolved from the rave and club scene, widening in scope to include traditional pop song structures.

inthemix.com.au said the release of "Spike" was "the turning point in their career" saying "the track perfectly encapsulated the group's reinvention of their sound into an unstoppable behemoth of dark, throbbing, techy filth, which came as a fresh, subtle alternative to the over-saturation of floaty, uplifting progressive house of the time."

=== 2003-2013: Six Feet Above Yesterday, All Night Sun Light and split ===
In October 2003, the group had relocated to Melbourne and signed with Sony BMG. In April 2004, Infusion released the single "Girls Can Be Cruel", which received airplay on Australia's alternative music radio station, Triple J. The song won the ARIA Award for Best Dance Release at the ARIA Music Awards of 2004. The band released Six Feet Above Yesterday in 2004, which won the Best Dance Release at the ARIA Music Awards of 2005. "Better World" and "Natural" were charting singles from the album.

Infusion's album All Night Sun Light was released on 7 July 2009 on its own independent label Futuresque. Infusion performed its last show with Leftfield at the Enmore Theatre in 2013.

=== Post-Infusion ===
Xavier produces records under the pseudonym Francis Xavier on Australian label Motorik!, and is a member of their rotating deejay collective, The Motorik Vibe Council, alongside members of The Lost Valentinos, The Bang Gang Deejays and Dreems, in addition to production credits on a plethora of tracks including Flight Facilities' debut "Crave You".

Jamie Stevens has released solo under his own name on a large variety of record labels.

=== 2019 reformation ===
On 16 November 2019, after a 7-year hiatus, Manuel Sharrad & Jamie Stevens performed in Melbourne under the Infusion banner, with long time friend and collaborator Phil K in place of Frank Xavier. The trio played at a laneway festival which took place at Bourke Place in Melbourne and the nightclub La Di Da. It celebrated the 22nd event for event organisers Sunny.

== Discography ==
=== Albums ===
List of albums
Title	Album details	Peak chart positions
Title	Album details	AUS
Phrases and Numbers	Released: 2000; Label: Thunk (TR016CD); Format: CD	-
Six Feet Above Yesterday	Released: 20 September 2004; Label: Sony BMG (82876650702); Format: CD	61
All Night Sun Light	Released: 7 July 2009; Label: Futuresque Records (FUT0001); Format: CD	-

=== Singles ===
List of singles
Title	Year	Peak chart positions	Album
Title	Year	AUS	Album
"Smokescreen / Lux"	1995	-	Non-album singles
"Green"	1996	-	Non-album singles
"Flinch"	1999	-	Non-album singles
"Spike"	2001	-	Phrases and Numbers
"Legacy"	2001	-	Phrases and Numbers
"Starwater (It's Alright)"	2002	-	Phrases and Numbers
"Dead Souls / Troika"	2003	-	Non-album single
"Girls Can Be Cruel"	2004	52	Six Feet Above Yesterday
"Better World"	2004	94	Six Feet Above Yesterday
"The Careless Kind"	2005	-	Six Feet Above Yesterday
"Natural"	2005	51	Six Feet Above Yesterday
"Dogtown"	2009	-	All Night Sun Light
"So Soon"	2009	-	All Night Sun Light
"Try It On"	2009	-	All Night Sun Light
"Gotta Leave Now"	2010	-	All Night Sun Light
"2-Player Game"	2011	-	All Night Sun Light
"Love & Imitation"	2011	-	Six Feet Above Yesterday

== Awards ==
=== ARIA Music Awards ===
Infusion have won two ARIA Music Awards from four nominations.

Year	Nominee / work	Award	Result
1996	"Smokescreen"	Best Dance Release	Nominated
2001	Phrases & Numbers	Best Dance Release	Nominated
2004	"Girls Can Be Cruel"	Best Dance Release	Won
2005	Six Feet Above Yesterday	Best Dance Release	Won
