= Sneaky Sound System discography =

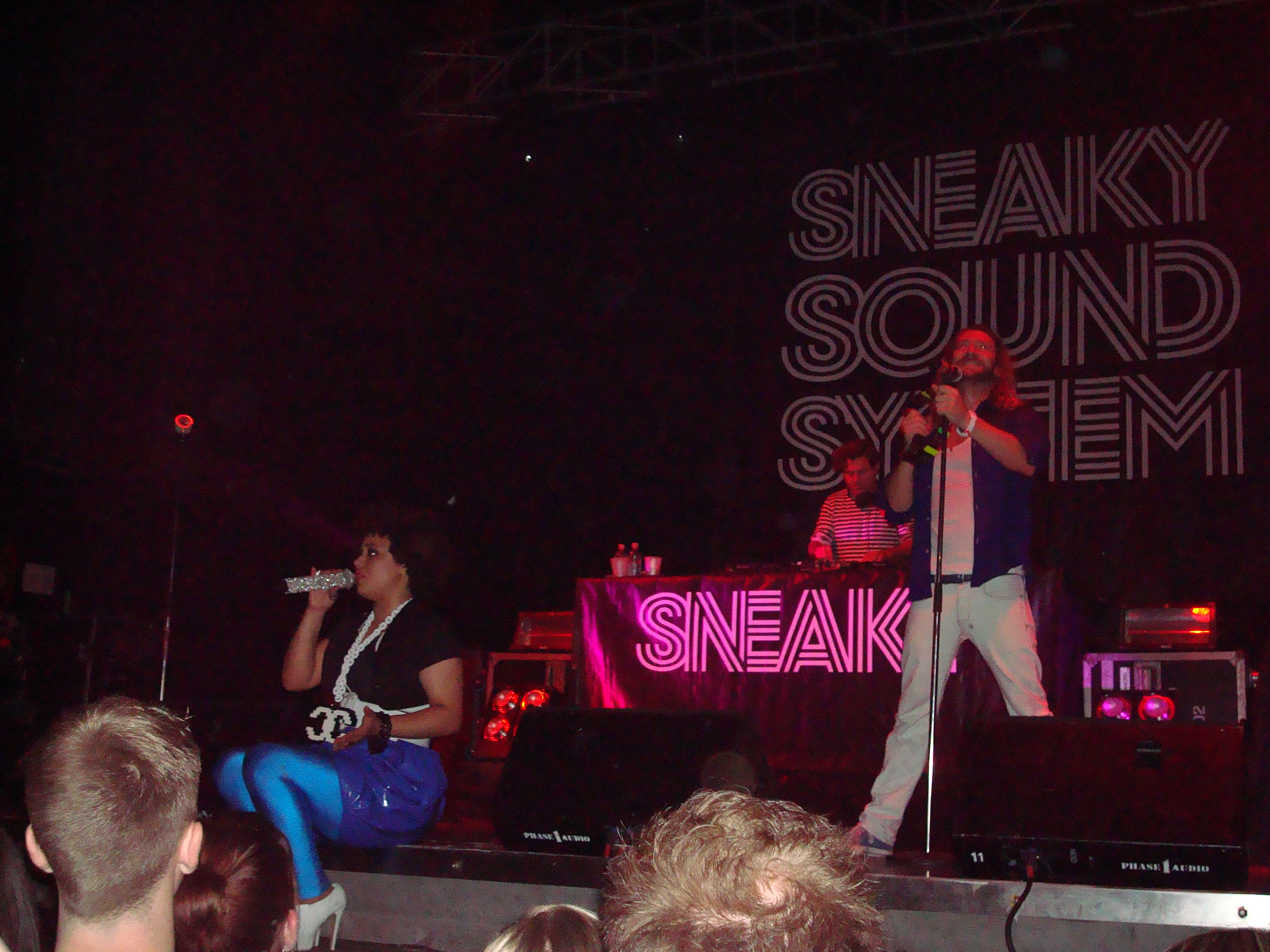
- Studio albums: 3
- Extended plays: 1
- Compilation albums: 2
- Singles: 23
- Music videos: 21
- Remix albums: 1

The discography of Sneaky Sound System, an Australian dance music group consists of three studio albums, two compilation albums, a remix album, twenty three singles and twenty-one music videos. The group formed in 2001, and released their first remix album, Other Peoples Music, in 2003 through Sony Music Australia.

After setting up their own record label, Whack Records, Sneaky Sound System released their self-titled debut studio album in 2006. The album spawned the hit singles "Pictures" and "UFO". It peaked at number five on the ARIA Albums Chart, and was certified triple platinum by the Australian Recording Industry Association (ARIA). The album earned the group seven nominations at the 2007 ARIA Music Awards, winning the awards for "Breakthrough Artist Album" and "Best Dance Release". In 2008, Sneaky Sound System released their second studio album, 2, which debuted at number one ARIA Albums Chart. Its lead single, "Kansas City", peaked at number fourteen on the ARIA Singles Chart and was certified gold.

In 2009, the group collaborated with Dutch DJ Tiësto on the track "I Will Be Here" for his fourth studio album, Kaleidoscope. The song reached the top fifty on the UK Singles Chart, and top forty on the Netherlands' Single Top 100 chart. Later that year, member Daimon Downey parted ways with the group to pursue other interests, leaving Angus McDonald and Connie Mitchell as the remaining members. In 2011, Sneaky Sound System signed with major record label, Modular Recordings. Their third studio album, From Here to Anywhere, was released on 7 October 2011. Its lead single, "We Love", was released on 27 May 2011.

== Albums ==
=== Studio albums ===
List of albums, with selected chart positions
Title	Album details	Peak chart positions	Certifications
Title	Album details	AUS	Certifications
Sneaky Sound System	Released: 12 August 2006; Label: Whack; Format: CD, 2×CD, DD	5	ARIA: 3× Platinum
2	Released: 16 August 2008; Label: Whack; Format: CD, 2×CD, DD, USB	1	ARIA: Gold
From Here to Anywhere	Released: 7 October 2011; Label: Modular; Format: CD, DD, LP	11	

=== Remix albums ===
Title	Album details
Other Peoples Music	Released: 6 October 2003 (AU); Label: Sony; Format: 2×CD

=== Compilation albums ===
Title	Album details
Sneak Preview – Mixes and Remixes	Released: 12 December 2008 (UK); Label: 14th Floor; Format: Digital download
Sneaky Sound System	Released: 20 April 2009 (UK); Label: 14th Floor, Whack; Format: CD, digital download; Note: A version of 2 with three songs from the band's debut ("I Love It", "Pictures" and "UFO") also included

== Extended plays ==
Title	EP details
Do Ya Thing EP	Released: 28 July 2017 (AU); Label: Club Sweat; Format: DD

== Singles ==
Title	Year	Peak chart positions			Certifications	Album
Title	Year	AUS	NL	UK	Certifications	Album
"Hip Hip Hooray"	2004	78	—	—		Sneaky Sound System
"Tease Me"	2005	—	—	—		Sneaky Sound System
"I Love It"	2006	24	—	—		Sneaky Sound System
"Pictures"	2006	19	—	76		Sneaky Sound System
"UFO"	2007	11	—	52	ARIA: Gold	Sneaky Sound System
"Goodbye"	2007	33	—	—		Sneaky Sound System
"Kansas City"	2008	14	—	—	ARIA: Gold	2
"When We Were Young"	2008	—	—	—		2
"16"	2009	53	—	—		2
"It's Not My Problem"	2009	—	—	—		2
"I Will Be Here" (Tiësto & Sneaky Sound System)	2009	59	33	44		Kaleidoscope
"We Love"	2011	29	—	—	ARIA: Gold	From Here to Anywhere
"Big"	2011	58	—	—		From Here to Anywhere
"Really Want to See You Again"	2012	—	—	—		From Here to Anywhere
"Friends"	2012	—	—	—		From Here to Anywhere
"This Feeling" (Larse & Sneaky Sound System)	2014	—	—	—		non-album singles
"Summertime Madness"	2015	—	—	—		non-album singles
"All I Need"	2015	—	—			non-album singles
"I Ain't Over You"	2016	79	—	—		non-album singles
"Pictures 2017"	2017	—	—	—		non-album singles
"I Love It 2018"	2018	—	—	—		non-album singles
"Can't Help the Way That I Feel"	2018	—	—	—		non-album singles
"We Belong"	2019	—	—	—		non-album singles
"Raise" (Watermät & Sneaky Sound System)	2019	—	—	—		non-album singles
"Tell the World" (Norman Doray & Sneaky Sound System)	2020	—	—	—		non-album singles
"Fire Keeps Burning" (John Dahlbäck & Sneaky Sound System)	2023	—	—	—		non-album singles
"Shiver"	2025	—	—	—		
"—" denotes a recording that did not chart or was not released in that territory.

== Other appearances ==
Title	Year	Album
"The One" (The Knocks featuring Sneaky Sound System)	2014	Comfortable EP
"Show Me" (DJ Zinc featuring Sneaky Sound System)	2014	non-album single

== Music videos ==
Title	Year	Director(s)
"Hip Hip Hooray"	2004	Brett Leonard
"Tease Me"	2005	Sneaky Sound System
"I Love It"	2006	Helen Clemens
"Pictures"	2006	Angus McDonald, Daimon Downey, Simon Davidson
"UFO"	2007	Clement Beauvais
"Goodbye"	2007	
"Pictures" (UK version)	2008	
"Kansas City"	2008	Adam Callen
"UFO" (UK version)	2008	James Copeman
"When We Were Young"	2008	Adam Callen
"I Love It" (UK version)	2009	
"16"	2009	
"I Will Be Here" (Tiësto & Sneaky Sound System)	2009	Masashi Muto
"It's Not My Problem"	2009	Maik Hempel
"We Love"	2011	Ollie Evans
"Big"	2011	Alan Algee
"Really Want to See You Again"	2012	Price James
"Friends"	2012	Connie Mitchell
"Summertime Madness"	2015	
"All I Need"	2015	
"I Ain't Over You"	2016	Nathan Lewis

== See also ==
- Whack Records discography
