= Sneaky Sound System (disambiguation) =

Sneaky Sound System are a Sydney-based Australian dance music group.

Sneaky Sound System may also refer to:

- Sneaky Sound System (2006 album), their debut album
- 2 (2008), sometimes referred to as Sneaky Sound System 2 or just Sneaky Sound System due to the similar artwork to the debut album
- Sneaky Sound System (2009 album), their second UK compilation album, comprising the majority of 2 and the three singles from Sneaky Sound System
