= Spike Stent =

English producer and mixer (born 1965)

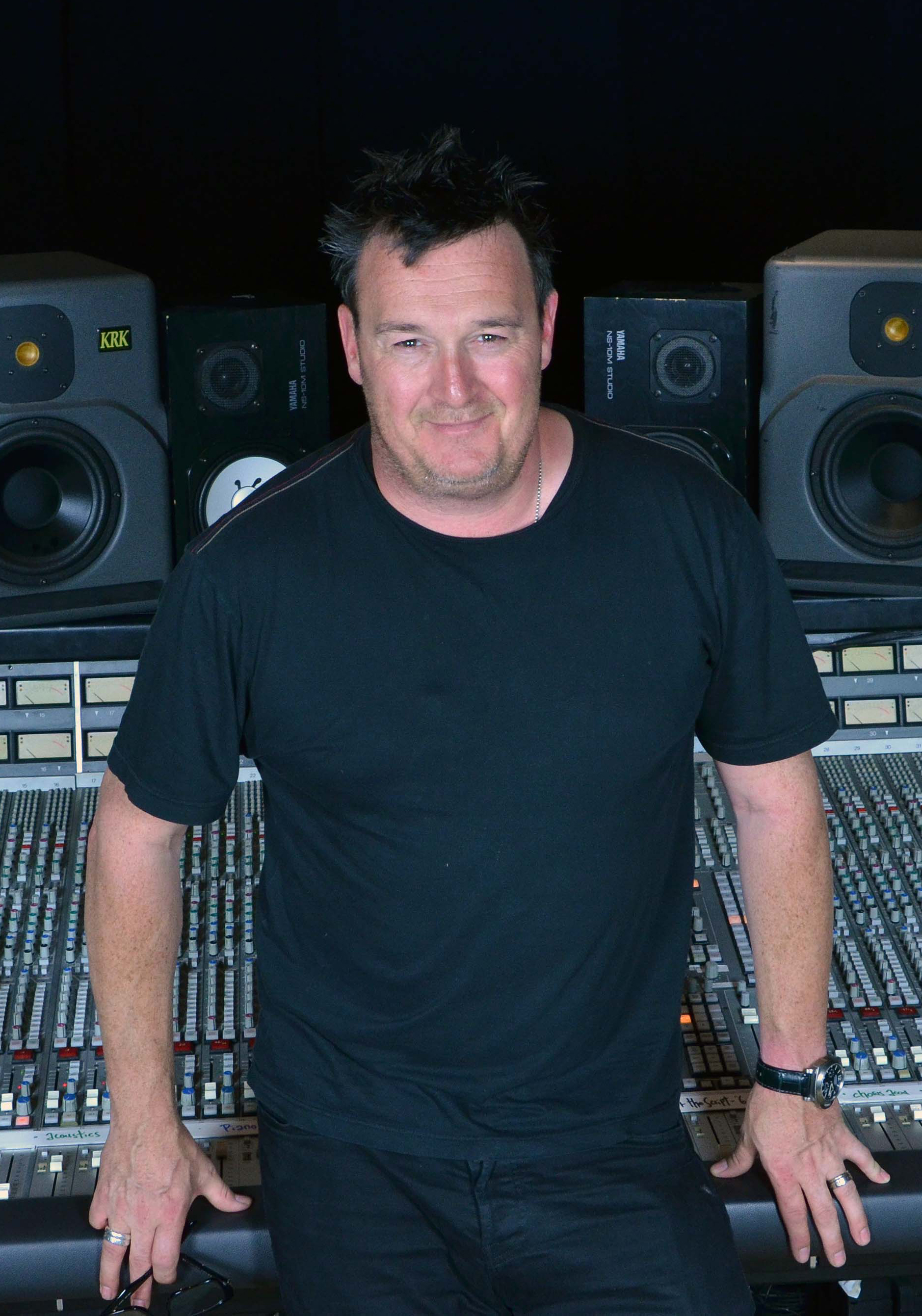
- Stent in 2012

Background information
- Also known as: Spike; Spikey Mikey
- Born: Mark Stent; 3 August 1965 (age 61); Alton, Hampshire, England
- Genres: Alternative rock; pop; pop rock; R&B; electronic
- Occupations: Mixer; producer
- Years active: 1985–present
- Labels: Columbia; Warner Bros.; Epic; Interscope
- Website: markspikestent.com

Mark "Spike" Stent (born 3 August 1965) is an English record producer and mixing engineer who has worked with many international artists including Madonna, Sade, Marshmello, U2, Beyoncé, the Beatles, Björk, Depeche Mode, Echo & the Bunnymen, the Foo Fighters, Grimes, Ed Sheeran, Beth Orton, Harry Styles, Frank Ocean, Vince Staples, Selena Gomez, All Saints, Spice Girls, Lady Gaga, Coldplay, Mansun, Gorillaz, Maroon 5, Muse, Lily Allen, Peter Gabriel, Gwen Stefani, Moby, No Doubt, Lenka, Usher, Kaiser Chiefs, Linkin Park, the Yeah Yeah Yeahs, Oasis, Keane, Massive Attack, Bastille, Diana Vickers and Take That.

== Career ==
Stent grew up in Hampshire, England and first gained experience as an engineer at Jacobs Studios as a teenager before a two-year stint at Trident Studios. After Trident, Stent worked at Olympic Studios in Barnes, South London. While at Olympic, Stent worked with artists such as Massive Attack, Bjork, Madonna, U2, Keane, and Oasis. Radiohead enlisted him to produce their 2007 album In Rainbows, but the collaboration was unsuccessful.

Stent works at two studios: Mix Suite LA in EastWest Studios and Mix Suite UK.

== Awards and nominations ==
=== Grammy Awards ===
Year	Album/Song	Artist	Award	Results	Ref
1996	Bedtime Stories	Madonna	Best Pop Vocal Album	Nominated	
1998	Homogenic	Björk	Best Alternative Music Album	Nominated	
2001	Music	Madonna	Best Pop Vocal Album	Nominated	
2001	Music	Madonna	Record of the Year	Nominated	
2002	Vespertine	Björk	Best Alternative Music Album	Nominated	
2005	Medulla	Björk	Grammy Best Alternative Album	Nominated	
2006	Love. Angel. Music. Baby.	Gwen Stefani	Grammy Best Pop Vocal Album	Nominated	
2006	Love. Angel. Music. Baby.	Gwen Stefani	Grammy Album of the Year	Nominated	
2006	Love. Angel. Music. Baby.	Gwen Stefani	Grammy Record of the Year	Nominated	
2006	Supernature	Goldfrapp	Grammy Best Electronic/Dance Album	Nominated	
2007	Confessions on a Dance Floor	Madonna	Grammy Best Dance/Electronic Album	Won	
2008	Volta	Bjork	Grammy Best Alternative Music Album	Nominated	
2008	Neon Bible	Arcade Fire	Grammy Best Alternative Album	Nominated	
2009	I Am... Sasha Fierce	Beyoncé	Grammy Best Contemporary R&B Album	Won	
2009	I Am... Sasha Fierce	Beyoncé	Grammy Album of the Year	Nominated	
2010	Funhouse	Pink	Grammy Best Pop Vocal Album	Nominated	
2010	It's Blitz	Yeah Yeah Yeahs	Grammy Best Alternative Music Album	Nominated	
2010	21st Century Breakdown	Green Day	Grammy Best Rock Music Album	Won	
2010	The Fame Monster	Lady Gaga	Grammy Best Pop Vocal Album	Won	
2010	The Resistance	Muse	Grammy Best Rock Album	Won	
2010	Head First	Goldfrapp	Grammy Best Dance/Electronica Album	Nominated	
2010	Raymond V Raymond	Usher	Grammy Best Contemporary R&B Album	Won	
2012	Channel Orange	Frank Ocean	Best Urban Contemporary Album	Won	
2013	"We Take Care of Our Own"	Bruce Springsteen	Best Rock Song	Nominated	
2013	Wrecking Ball	Bruce Springsteen	Best Rock Album	Nominated	
2013	Red	Taylor Swift	Album of the Year	Nominated	
2013	The 2nd Law	Muse	Best Rock Album	Nominated	
2015	x	Ed Sheeran	Best Pop Vocal Album	Nominated	
2015	x	Ed Sheeran	Album of the Year	Nominated	
2016	"Thinking Out Loud"	Ed Sheeran	Record of the Year	Nominated	
2016	How Big, How Blue, How Beautiful	Florence + the Machine	Best Pop Vocal Album	Nominated	
2016	"What Kind of Man"	Florence and the Machine	Best Rock Song	Nominated	
2017	"Tearing Me Up"	Bob Moses	Best Dance Recording	Nominated	
2018	÷	Ed Sheeran	Best Pop Vocal Album	Won	
2024	"Flowers"	Miley Cyrus	Record of the Year	Won	
2025	"Now and Then"	the Beatles	Record of the Year	Nominated	

=== Billboard Music Awards ===
Year	Artist	Album/Song	Award	Result
2001	Madonna	"Music"	Top Hot Dance Club Play	Won
2001	Madonna	"Music"	Top Hot Dance Maxi Single Sales	Won
2005	Gwen Stefani	"Hollaback Girl"	Digital Song the Year	Won

=== Music Producers Guild (MPG) Awards ===
Year	Award	Results
2011	Mix Engineer of the Year MPG Awards	Won
2014	Mix Engineer of the Year MPG Awards	Won
2015	Mix Engineer of the Year MPG Awards	Won
2020	Mix Engineer of the Year MPG Awards	Won

== Selected film credits ==
Artist	Track/Album	Year	Film
U2	"Hold Me, Thrill Me, Kiss Me, Kill Me"	1995	Batman Forever
Tina Turner	"GoldenEye"	1995	GoldenEye
Björk	Selmasongs	2000	Dancer in the Dark
Madonna	"Die Another Day"	2002	Die Another Day

== Selected discography ==
=== 1980s ===
- 1985: The Cult – Love
- 1987: Erasure – It Doesn't Have to Be
- 1988: The Mission – Children
- 1989: ABC – Up

=== 1990s ===
- 1991: The KLF – The White Room
- 1993: Depeche Mode – Songs of Faith and Devotion
- 1994: Madonna – Bedtime Stories
- 1994: Massive Attack – Protection
- 1996: Spice Girls – Spice
- 1997: Björk – Homogenic
- 1997: Erasure – Cowboy
- 1997: Spice Girls – Spice World
- 1997: U2 – Pop
- 1998: Mansun – Six
- 1998: Massive Attack – Mezzanine
- 1999: Echo & The Bunnymen – What Are You Going to Do with Your Life? – (Rust (song))

=== 2000s ===
- 2000: All Saints – Saints & Sinners ("Black Coffee", "Pure Shores")
- 2000: Madonna – Music
- 2000: Oasis – Familiar to Millions
- 2000: Oasis – Standing on the Shoulder of Giants
- 2001: Björk – Vespertine
- 2001: No Doubt – Rock Steady
- 2002: Linkin Park – Reanimation
- 2002: Oasis – Heathen Chemistry
- 2003: Dave Mathews Band – Some Devil
- 2003: Madonna – American Life
- 2003: Massive Attack – 100th Window
- 2003: The Black Eyed Peas – Elephunk
- 2004: Björk – Medúlla
- 2004: Gwen Stefani – Love. Angel. Music. Baby.
- 2004: Keane – Hopes and Fears
- 2004: Natasha Bedingfield – Unwritten
- 2005: Aqualung – Strange and Beautiful ("Easier to Lie")
- 2005: Dave Mathews Band – Stand Up
- 2005: Fischerspooner – Odyssey
- 2005: Goldfrapp – Supernature
- 2005: Kaiser Chiefs – Employment ("Everyday I Love You Less and Less")
- 2005: Madonna – Confessions on a Dance Floor
- 2005: The Black Eyed Peas – Monkey Business
- 2006: Depeche Mode – The Complete Depeche Mode ("A Pain That I'm Used To")
- 2006: Gwen Stefani – The Sweet Escape
- 2006: Keane – Under the Iron Sea
- 2006: The Feeling – Twelve Stops and Home
- 2007: Arcade Fire – Neon Bible ("Black Mirror", "No Cars Go")
- 2007: Björk – Volta
- 2007: Hard-Fi – Once Upon a Time in the West ("Suburban Knights")
- 2007: M.I.A – Kala ("Boyz", "Jimmy")
- 2007: Maroon 5 – It Won't Be Soon Before Long
- 2007: Natasha Bedingfield – N.B
- 2007: Stereophonics – Pull The Pin ("Rewind")
- 2008: Beyoncé – I Am... Sasha Fierce
- 2008: CSS – Donkey
- 2008: Madonna – Hard Candy
- 2008: Pink – Funhouse
- 2008: Sneaky Sound System – Sneaky Sound System ("Kansas City", "UFO")
- 2008: The Pussycat Dolls – Doll Domination ("When I Grow Up")
- 2008: The Script – The Script ("Breakeven", "Talk You Down", "The Man Who Can't Be Moved")
- 2009: Cheryl Cole – 3 Words ("Fight for This Love")
- 2009: Ciara – Fantasy Ride ("G Is for Girl")
- 2009: FrankMusik – Complete Me ("Confusion Girl")
- 2009: Franz Ferdinand – Tonight: Franz Ferdinand ("Katherine")
- 2009: Green Day – 21st Century Breakdown ("Last of the American Girls", "21 Guns", "Rain on Me")
- 2009: Lady Gaga – The Fame Monster ("Bad Romance", "Telephone" Featuring Beyoncé)
- 2009: Lenka – Trouble Is a Friend
- 2009: Lily Allen – It's Not Me, It's You ("Everyone's at It", "The Fear")
- 2009: Muse – The Resistance
- 2009: Sean Garrett – Turbo 919 ("Why", "What You Doin' Turbo 919")
- 2009: Tegan & Sara – Sainthood ("Hell")
- 2009: The Yeah Yeah Yeahs – It's Blitz
- 2009: The Yeah You's – Looking Through You
- 2009: Vedera – Stages ("Satisfy", "Loving Ghosts", "Back to the Middle")

=== 2010s ===
- 2010: Cheryl Cole – Messy Little Raindrops
- 2010: Sade – Soldier Of Love
- 2010: Christina Aguilera – Bionic ("Little Dreamer", "Kimono Girl", "Birds of Prey")
- 2010: Duran Duran – All You Need Is Now
- 2010: Ellie Goulding – Lights
- 2010: Goldfrapp – Head First
- 2010: Hurts – Happiness
- 2010: James Blunt – Some Kind of Trouble
- 2010: Lights – The Listening ("Ice")
- 2010: N.E.R.D – Nothing
- 2010: Nelly Furtado – The Best of Nelly Furtado ("Girlfriend in the City")
- 2010: P Diddy – Last Train to Paris ("Hello Good Morning")
- 2010: Take That – Progress
- 2010: The Script – Science and Faith
- 2010: The Wanted – The Wanted
- 2010: Usher – Raymond v. Raymond
- 2011: Bruce Springsteen – Wrecking Ball
- 2011: Coldplay – Mylo Xyloto
- 2011: Florence + The Machine – Ceremonials
- 2012: Frank Ocean – Channel Orange
- 2012: Muse – The 2nd Law
- 2012: No Doubt – Push and Shove
- 2012: Taylor Swift – Red
- 2013: Bastille – Bad Blood
- 2013: Biffy Clyro – Opposites
- 2013: Haim – Days Are Gone
- 2013: John Newman – Tribute
- 2013: Moby – Innocents
- 2013: One Direction – Midnight Memories
- 2013: Rudimental – Home
- 2013: White Lies – Big TV
- 2014: Coldplay – Ghost Stories
- 2014: Ed Sheeran – x
- 2014: Kasabian – 48:13
- 2014: The Script – No Sound Without Silence
- 2015: Chvrches – Every Open Eye
- 2015: Duran Duran – Paper Gods
- 2015: Florence + the Machine – How Big, How Blue, How Beautiful
- 2015: Grimes – Art Angels
- 2015: Selena Gomez – Revival
- 2016: Gwen Stefani – This Is What the Truth Feels Like
- 2017: Bishop Briggs – "Dream"
- 2017: DreamCar – "Dreamcar"
- 2017: Ed Sheeran – ÷
- 2017: Harry Styles – Harry Styles
- 2017: Jessie Ware – Glasshouse
- 2017: Julia Michaels – "Issues"
- 2017: Julia Michaels – "Nervous Systems"
- 2017: Julia Michaels – "Uh Huh"
- 2017: Justin Bieber and BloodPop – "Friends"
- 2017: Kesha – "This Is Me"
- 2017: Liam Gallagher – "As You Were"
- 2017: Miguel – "War & Leisure"
- 2017: Mondo Cozmo – "Plastic Soul"
- 2017: Muse – "Dig Down"
- 2017: Niall Horan – "Slow Hands"
- 2017: PVRIS – "All We Know of Heaven, All We Need of Hell"
- 2017: Rita Ora – "Your Song"
- 2017: Take That – "Giants"
- 2017: Vince Staples – Big Fish Theory
- 2018: Cardi B – "Thru Your Phone"
- 2018: Chvrches – Love Is Dead
- 2018: Elton John – Revamp tracks "Your Song" featuring Lady Gaga and "Bennie and the Jets" featuring Pink and Logic
- 2018: Jade Bird – "Lottery"
- 2018: Marshmello featuring Anne Marie – "Friends"
- 2018: Pale Waves – "Heavenly"
- 2018: Post Malone – "Stay"
- 2018: Rudimental – "These Days" featuring Jess Glynne, Macklemore and Dan Caplen
- 2018: Years & Years – "Sanctify"
- 2019: Charli XCX featuring Lizzo – "Blame It on Your Love"

=== 2020s ===
- 2020: 5 Seconds of Summer – Calm
- 2020: Marilyn Manson – We Are Chaos
- 2020: Miley Cyrus – Plastic Hearts
- 2020: Niall Horan – Heartbreak Weather
- 2020: Ted When – Edge Off
- 2021: John Mayer – Sob Rock
- 2022: Liam Gallagher – C'mon You Know
- 2023: Blink-182 – One More Time...
- 2023: Foo Fighters – But Here We Are
- 2023: Gorillaz – Cracker Island
- 2023: Peter Gabriel – i/o
- 2023: the Beatles – "Now and Then"
- 2024: Blink-182 - One More Time... Part-2
- 2024: Indochine - Babel Babel
- 2024: Julian Lennon "I Should Have Known" (Spike Stent Version)
- 2024: Liam Gallagher and John Squire Liam Gallagher John Squire
- 2025: Lorde - Virgin
- 2025: Yungblud - Zombie
- 2026: Foo Fighters – Your Favorite Toy
- 2026: Holly Humberstone - Cruel World
- 2026: Peter Gabriel – o\i
- 2026: Harry Styles – Kiss All The Time, Disco Occasionally
