= Connie Mitchell =

Australian singer

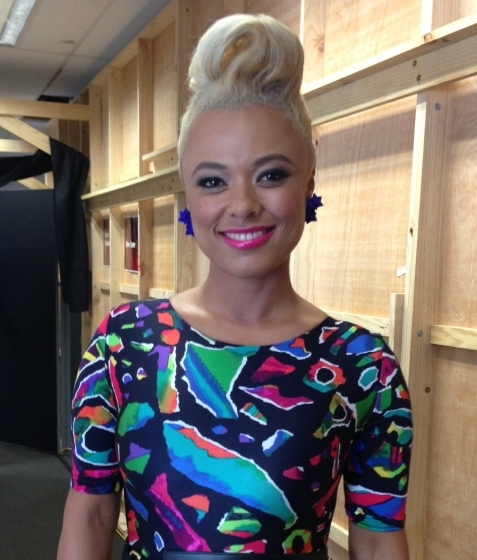
- Mitchell backstage at The Voice, March 2013

Background information
- Also known as: Miss Connie, Feyonce
- Born: Connie Thembi Mitchell c. 1977 (age 48–49); South Africa
- Origin: Sydney, Australia
- Genres: Electropop; dance
- Occupation: Singer
- Years active: 1995–present

Connie Thembi Mitchell (born c. 1977), also known as Miss Connie, is a South African-born Australian singer. In 1995 she was a founding member of Primary. Briefly, in 2004, she was vocalist for Machine Gun Fellatio under the pseudonym Feyonce. Since mid-2005 Mitchell is the lead vocalist with Sneaky Sound System, appearing on their singles: "I Love It" (July 2006), "Pictures" (December), "UFO" (April 2007), "Goodbye" (October), "Kansas City" (July 2008), "When We Were Young" (November), "16" (February 2009) and "We Love" (May 2011).

== Early years to 2004 ==
Connie Thembi Mitchell was born c. 1977 in South Africa. Her mother was a singer in a musical troupe, Ipi Tombi, while her grandfather and father had extensive record collections. After leaving South Africa, Mitchell lived in New Zealand and attended a primary school, where "I discovered I could sing. I'd heard some opera singers, someone like Dame Kiri Te Kanawa, and I could put on that voice". She arrived in Australia aged 11, and attended Riverside Girls High School in Sydney. She did also spend a year at St. Monica's College in Cairns, Queensland.

At the age of seventeen in 1994, Mitchell released her first single, Forever and Ever, through Warner Music Australia. Despite being featured in the soundtrack to popular TV series Heartbreak High and its accompanying album, the single did not chart and Mitchell did not release any further solo material.

While still at secondary school Mitchell met the Fonti brothers, Jamie and Sean, who were members of the techno-grunge band, Caligula. With Mitchell on lead vocals; Jamie on keyboard programming, guitar and samples; Sean on bass guitar (ex-Massappeal, Def FX); and John Bousfield on guitar they formed another techno rock group, Primary in late 1996. Australian musicologist, Ian McFarlane, described their sound as "Dominated by ... Mitchell's hyperactive and full-frontal vocals, with thunderous electronic rock underpinning the music, Primary sounded like a techno Skunk Anansie".

Primary's debut release was a five-track extended play, Vicious Precious, in March 1998. Mitchell described their song writing process "When we write, I sing over something the boys have done and there are lyrics in there. I don't know where they come from. I think it's a mood thing – they convey what kind of mood we were in when we were doing it". The group followed with their debut album, This Is the Sound, in the next year. Their second album, Watching the World, was praised by journalist, Ed Nimmervoll, as his Album of the Week in May 2001 "music with many layers of interest. Connie's lyrics are a strong counterpoint to the depth of the band's music". Mitchell joined Machine Gun Fellatio as a vocalist for a short stint in 2004, appearing under the alias "Feyonce".

== Sneaky Sound System ==
Connie Mitchell's next band, Sneaky Sound System, developed from Sneaky Sundays night club, launched in 2001 by Black Angus (aka Angus McDonald) and Daimon Downey. In 2004 Angus and Downey met Mitchell in a park as she was playing guitar with a friend and the duo asked Mitchell to become their singer "I thought they were a bit dodgy ... You know, two guys coming up to you, excited, jumping around a bit, saying 'Come to our studio'". The pair did own a studio, when Mitchell sang on "I Love It" Sneaky Sound System had their new vocalist – it became their breakthrough single in July 2006. The track peaked at No. 24 on the ARIA Singles Chart; it was in the top 100 for a then-record 73 weeks by January 2008.

Their self-titled debut album followed in August on their own label, Whack Records. Angus noted that "We were told by every label we might sell 10,000 copies and it wasn't worth it, so we decided to do it ourselves". The album peaked at No. 5 on the ARIA Albums Chart and was certified 3× platinum for shipment of 210000 units. Aside from providing vocals Mitchell shares song writing credits, generally with McDonald, on much of the group's material including, "Pictures". At the 2006 International Songwriting Competition, the track came second in the Dance/Electronica category.

Mitchell spent a couple of weeks in early 2007 recording vocals for US rapper, Kanye West, in Los Angeles. She features on four tracks on West's third studio album, Graduation (September 2007), including two singles, "Can't Tell Me Nothing" (May) and "Flashing Lights" (November), and the intro song, "Good Morning". With Sneaky Sound System, Mitchell supported Robbie Williams and Scissor Sisters, and her group played the Australian leg of the worldwide concert Live Earth in July 2007.

Their next album, 2 (August 2008), entered the ARIA Albums Chart at number one, and Mitchell has since appeared on albums by West, Snoop Dogg and Rick Ross. She was described as "a star in her own right" with a golden voice by Channel [V] reporter. Mitchell also recorded vocals on tracks for Snoop Dogg during his extended stay in Sydney for the Good Vibrations Festival.

As of 2009, Mitchell is the only singer in Sneaky Sound System after Downey announced he was leaving the band to pursue other interests. In March 2013 she was announced as mentor to Seal's artists for the 2013 Australian season of TV talent quest, The Voice. In April that year, in a peer-voted survey conducted by Melbourne's Herald Sun newspaper, Mitchell was rated at No. 18 on a list of Australia's greatest singers of all time.

== Discography ==
=== Charity singles ===
List of charity singles
Title	Year	Peak chart positions	Notes
Title	Year	AUS	Notes
"I Touch Myself" (as part of the I Touch Myself Project)	2014	72	The I Touch Myself Project launched in 2014 with a mission to encourage young women to touch themselves regularly to find early signs of cancer.
