= Can't Tell Me Nothing =

2007 song by Kanye West

Single by Kanye West

from the album Graduation and the mixtape Can't Tell Me Nothing
- B-side: "Barry Bonds"
- Released: May 15, 2007
- Recorded: 2005–2006
- Studio: Doppler (Atlanta); Sony Music (NYC); Record Plant (Hollywood); Chalice (Los Angeles)
- Genre: Hip hop
- Length: 4:31
- Label: Roc-A-Fella; Def Jam
- Songwriters: Kanye West; Connie Mitchell; Aldrin Davis
- Producers: Kanye West; DJ Toomp

Kanye West singles chronology
"Classic (Better Than I've Ever Been)" (2007)	"Can't Tell Me Nothing" (2007)	"Stronger" (2007)

Music video
- "Can't Tell Me Nothing" on YouTube

"Can't Tell Me Nothing" is a song by American rapper Kanye West from his third studio album, Graduation (2007). The song contains additional vocals from Young Jeezy and Connie Mitchell. It was produced by West with DJ Toomp with West being responsible for 60 percent of the production. The song originated from Young Jeezy's "I Got Money", after West made changes to the track. On May 15, 2007, the song premiered via Hot 97 and was released by Roc-A-Fella and Def Jam that same day as the lead single from the album. A hip hop track, it was described by West as a theme song for the people. The lyrics see West reflecting on his fame while he expresses different types of feelings.

"Can't Tell Me Nothing" received universal acclaim from music critics, who mostly appreciated the lyrical content. Others praised the production, while some critics highlighted the song's inclusion on Graduation. It was listed amongst the best tracks of 2007 by several publications, including Consequence of Sound and Pitchfork. The song received a nomination for Best Rap Song at the 50th Annual Grammy Awards, ultimately losing to "Good Life" from the same album. The former reached number 41 on the US Billboard Hot 100, alongside peaking at number 20 on the US Hot R&B/Hip-Hop Songs chart, and was certified triple platinum in the United States by the Recording Industry Association of America. It has also been certified platinum and gold in the United Kingdom and Australia by the British Phonographic Industry and Australian Recording Industry Association, respectively.

An accompanying music video was released on May 25, 2007. It sees West walking around El Mirage Lake unaccompanied, while his silhouette follows him. The video received positive reviews from critics, who have often complimented its camerawork. The song's alternate music video was released on July 25, 2007, which features Zach Galifianakis and Will Oldham lip-syncing "Can't Tell Me Nothing" at Galifianakis's farm. West performed the song live throughout 2007 and 2008, including at a Live Earth concert in the former year. He later performed it at the Coachella Valley Music and Arts Festival and Glastonbury Festival in 2011 and 2015, respectively.

"Can't Tell Me Nothing" was used in the film The Hangover (2009), marking the first of three times that West's music would be featured in the films from the series of the same name. In 2013, West named it his favorite song out of his entire discography. Francis and the Lights covered the song in 2009, and an acoustic cover version was later performed by Taking Back Sunday in 2011. The song's Young Jeezy-featuring remix was released in July 2007, which contains a verse from him.

== Background and development ==
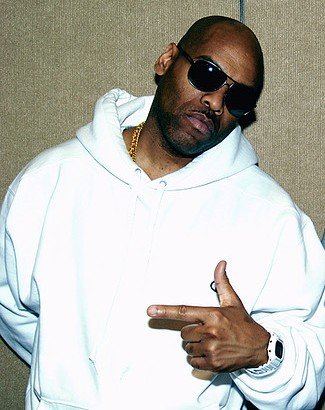
DJ Toomp produced the song alongside West.

Following on from meeting West when working on rapper T.I.'s second studio album Trap Muzik (2003), record producer DJ Toomp went to New York City (NYC) and joined West in the studio for the creation of Graduation. West showed a high amount of respect for him and was using an Ensoniq ASR-10 keyboard in the studio, which DJ Toomp said "is the same keyboard I've been using since day one." Speaking of the two of them collaborating for the album, he opined that "it definitely felt like a team atmosphere" and also "felt like, 'we.'" DJ Toomp admitted that he "would say that sixty percent of 'Can't Tell Me Nothing' was Ye, and forty me," while he called West "a mastermind." In an interview with Revolt, DJ Toomp explained that his 40 percent of the song's production was the beat and bassline, while the 60 percent contributed by West consisted of the strings, synths, and the "oh-oh-ah-oh-ah-oh" backing vocals. He revealed that the song was originally supposed to be a remix of West's Def Jam labelmate Young Jeezy's song "I Got Money", since West loved "the whole cadence of how that beat was flowing" and "wanted the song to be a remix featuring him." However, Young Jeezy ultimately "wasn't really feeling it" according to DJ Toomp, which led to the song being passed on to West.

Young Jeezy also offered an explanation of how "Can't Tell Me Nothing" came from "I Got Money" during an interview with HipHopDX, saying that it was supposed to be a collaboration between him and T.I. for the former's third studio album The Recession (2008). The song was recalled as being sent to West by Young Jeezy and he subsequently recorded a verse, before getting in contact with DJ Toomp after discovering that he was the producer and West then heavily altered the sonic direction of "I Got Money". Due to the changes made by West, Young Jeezy explained that he decided not to release the song on the album. By 2007, six months later, the song was unused until West played "Can't Tell Me Nothing" for Young Jeezy at a studio session in Los Angeles, which is a reworked version of "I Got Money", though he revealed that West asked him for permission to use his ad-libs and was granted it. The track marked the two's first collaboration, though Young Jeezy admitted after contributing that he "was like, 'Yo, [West] owes me one." For giving back to him, West delivered a verse on Young Jeezy's single "Put On" (2008).

While traveling to Japan for a few days in 2006, West visited Japanese contemporary artist Takashi Murakami at the artist's Kaikai Kiki studio in Asaka. West told Murakami that he is a fan of him and asked about the artist's works; Murakami drew designs for West during the meeting and the two of them arranged to meet at a later date in the United States. The cover art of the single was designed by Murakami. Accompanying artwork for the album's other singles was also created by Murakami, alongside him overseeing the art direction of Graduation. Despite "Can't Tell Me Nothing" not achieving the same level of radio success as the album's subsequent singles, West took pride in the fact that the song had marked his first hood anthem, and it gave him a new level of popularity in the hood. West also explained during an interview with Concrete Loop that the song "is like the people's anthem and radio didn't want to play it," while comparing the challenge faced by him to playing a video game. In the same interview, West stated that the song's "actual melody is made to rock 50,000 people," which he called the reason as to "why it's so simple." According to West, he tried to step up as a rapper with the song and West recalled that after fellow rapper Andre 3000 heard the song "he said, 'I believe you.'" West named "Can't Tell Me Nothing" as an example of him creating a track "that people never heard before."

== Composition and lyrics ==
"Can't Tell Me Nothing"
A 25-second sample of the song's chorus, which includes strings in its instrumentation. The chorus features a loop of Connie Mitchell's vocals, alongside the frequent repetition of Young Jeezy's backing ad-libs.

Musically, "Can't Tell Me Nothing" is a hip hop track. The song features slow, moody synth-driven production, which contains foghorn keyboards. It also includes a bassline alongside strings. West explained that the song's chords are akin to that of a rock melody, specifically comparing them to the music of Led Zeppelin. The song contains ad-libs from Young Jeezy in the background, which are repeated throughout the chorus. Additional vocals are also provided by Connie Mitchell of the Australian electronic group Sneaky Sound System, being looped within the song.

West explained that he wanted to create a theme song with the track, describing it as being a song for the people. Lyrically, "Can't Tell Me Nothing" serves as West's reflection on his fame and as a result of this, he hovers between insecure and confrontational while marked by bitter regret as well as self-aware defiance. West begins the song by expounding his conflicted feelings regarding wealth and desire, describing a compulsion to spend that overwhelms any and all other objectives in life. This is tied by West into his perceived overall inability to keep himself together even as he grows into an increasingly prominent figure in the public eye with lyrics like, "I feel the pressure, under more scrutiny / And what do I do? Act more stupidly." Uncertainty is also expressed by West in the song's lyrics, with him asking: "Then you can't tell me nothing, right?" Shortly afterwards, West affirms "you can't tell me nothing." The song marks the first use of the word "apologing", which was invented as a way to rhyme "apologizing" with the previous line's "collagen". West said the line "When You Try Hard, That's when you Die Hard" is about having accepted who he is and stopping trying to prove himself all the time, while West revealed that it refers to the outfit worn by him at the 48th Annual Grammy Awards in 2006.

== Release and reception ==
West premiered "Can't Tell Me Nothing" via Hot 97 on May 15, 2007, with it being played by DJ Enuff. That same day, the song was released as the lead single from Graduation. West decided on the song being the first single due to fellow rapper 50 Cent calling it his favorite song from the album, after West met with 50 Cent and played the album to him. On June 19, 2007, the song was serviced to US rhythmic contemporary radio stations through West's record labels Roc-A-Fella Records and Def Jam Recordings. A 12" vinyl was later released for the song by Universal Music on August 7 of that year. On September 11, 2007, West's third studio album Graduation was released, featuring "Can't Tell Me Nothing" as the sixth track.

The song was met with universal acclaim from music critics, with general praise for West's lyricism. In a highly positive review for Slant Magazine, Eric Henderson noted "Can't Tell Me Nothing" for having the "most justifiable title" on the album and expressed the opinion that "you couldn't find a campus library cavernous enough" for annotating the song. Dan Weiss from LAS highlighted it as the peak of West's examination of "his character flaws every few tracks in a manner that's neither pitying nor arrogant" throughout the album, with Weiss branding the song a "secret sing-along." Dave Heaton of PopMatters described the song as a "powerful single," while he commented that it is the only track on Graduation which deals with reservations about the album's "major theme" of fame and wealth "in any substantial way." In the Chicago Tribune, Greg Kot chronicled West's performance as "defiant, defensive, rueful, sarcastic and deadly passionate." Nathan Rabin from The A.V. Club called the song a "terrific hyper-soul single" that "tempers" the enthusiasm of West "with the haunting realization that for someone who's hit the top, there's nowhere to go but down, and the public's love has a tricky way of curdling into resentment." MTV writer Shaheem Reid called it "aptly titled," while complimenting West's rapping for him dropping "a myriad of one-liners."

Writing for NME, Louis Pattison labeled the song "pretty special," describing it as "a rare sort of track that brings little but chest-pumped arrogance and shameless cash-flashing to the table." Jesal 'Jay Soul' Padania of RapReviews viewed "Can't Tell Me Nothing" as "brilliant" and pointed out that the beat, verses and chorus are "all classic stuff." Spin journalist Charles Aaron praised the song's "soulful double-unconsciousness." For Pitchfork, Mark Pytlik asserted that the song's production somehow takes "on new life in context of the record." In a less enthusiastic review, The Guardian's Dorian Lynskey branded it a "tense, angry" track, though criticized certain lyrics for being disappointing.

== Accolades ==
"Can't Tell Me Nothing" appeared on year-end lists for 2007 of multiple publications. The track was voted 34th on The Village Voice's Pazz & Jop poll for that year with 12 mentions, tying it with 4 other songs for the position. PopMatters named the track the 30th best song of 2007, with Barry Lenser of the magazine praising West's performance as well as calling the track "rich and hypnotic." It was ranked as the 29th best song of the year by Junkmedia, while Pitchfork listed the track as the 25th best song. Stylus Magazine cited it as the 13th best song of 2007. The track was ranked by Entertainment Weekly as the sixth best song of the year, and the staff admitted that the beat "might be [West's] most mesmerizing ever." Consequence of Sound named it the third best song of 2007, while the track's best achievement was being listed as the second best song of the year by laut.de.

For the 2014 issue of XXL that celebrated 40 years of hip hop, the track was listed as one of the five best singles of 2007. In 2009, the track was ranked as the fifth best song of the 2000s by Complex. On a 2017 list of the greatest rap songs since 2000 by Cleveland.com, the track was ranked at number 56. In 2014, LA Weekly named "Can't Tell Me Nothing" the 17th best song in hip hop history. Complex named the track their song of the Complex decade, which spanned from when the magazine was founded in 2002 to its 10th anniversary in 2012. The track was later ranked by Complex as West's second best song in 2018, while the magazine listed it among rap's most motivational songs two years later.

At the 50th Annual Grammy Awards in 2008, the song and fellow Graduation single "Good Life" were both contenders for the award of Best Rap Song. This made West the only artist to receive two nominations for Best Rap Song at the ceremony; he was mostly nominated in rap categories. However, the song lost the award to "Good Life" at the Grammy Awards. "Can't Tell Me Nothing" was nominated for Track of the Year at the 2007 BET Hip Hop Awards, ultimately losing to "Party Like a Rockstar" by Shop Boyz.

== Music videos ==
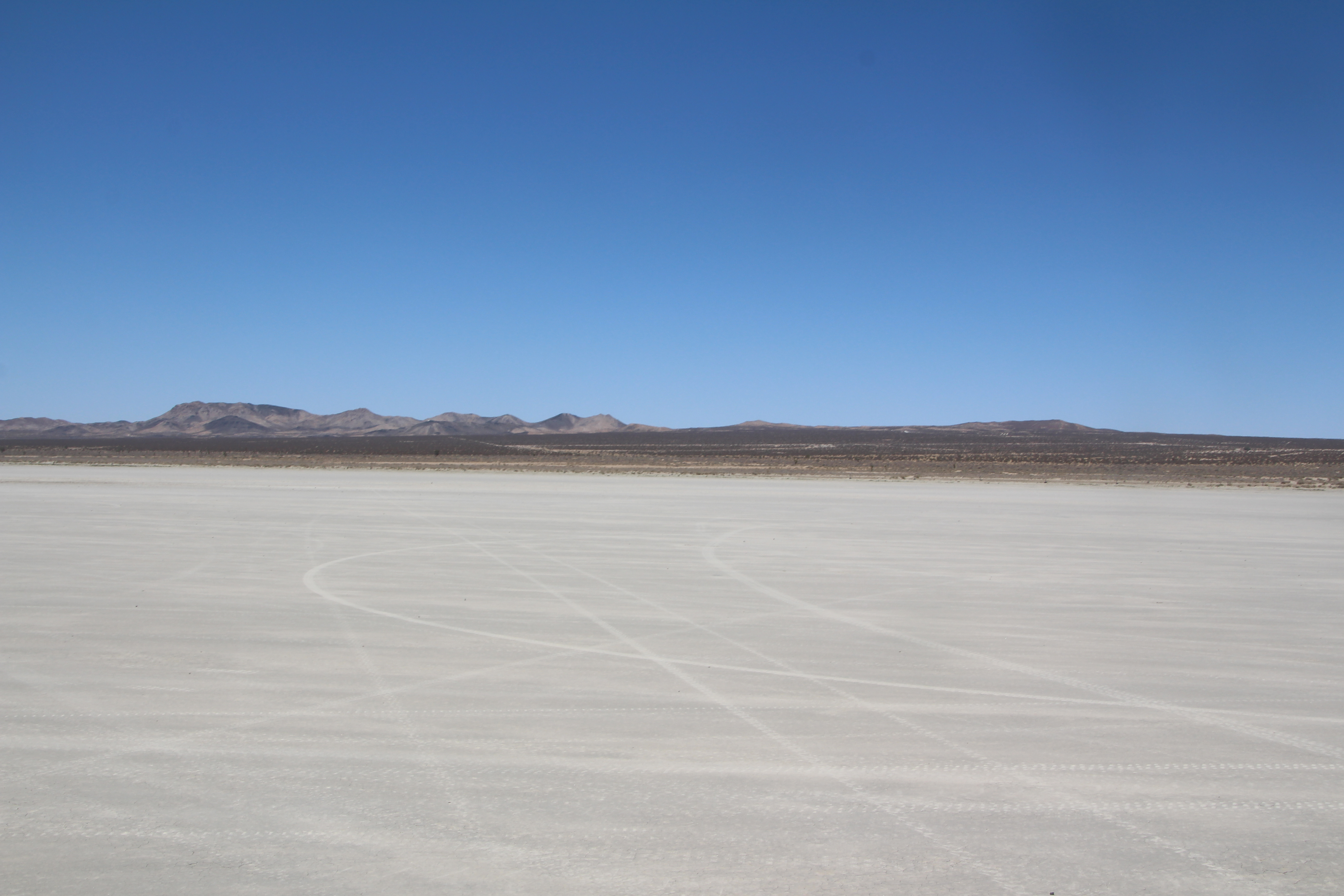
The first music video is set at El Mirage Lake in Victor Valley.

Two separate music videos were released to accompany "Can't Tell Me Nothing". The first music video was directed by Hype Williams, who West had collaborated with previously on videos. Due to wanting to create simplistic images with the visual, West reached out to Williams. It was filmed at the dry lake bed El Mirage Lake, which is located in the Mojave Desert's northwestern Victor Valley. On May 25, 2007, the video was premiered by West through his website. It was also released for download via the iTunes Store.

The music video is set in both daytime and the night, seeing West wearing a mankerchief and medallion. It features West as the sole star, with him walking around the desert. West is accompanied by his silhouette, and there is a vivid blue sky and blazing sun in the background. A number of scenes are shot from above, showing the body of West moving in and out of view. Following on from the shots, a smoke machine and spotlights are turned on. A Lamborghini car is included in the video, appearing as B-roll footage. In another B-roll shot, a girl wearing a fly away burka is shown, which was compared to the clothing worn in the 1998 music video for American singer Madonna's single "Frozen". Steven Gottlieb of Video Static called the visual "surprisingly watchable" and commented that its "epic scope makes sure we can't take our eyes off [West]," while Nadine Cheung from The Boombox described West as looking "tough" as his silhouette "dances among a sprawling desert." Entertainment Weekly's Chris Schonberger opined that the music video "offers a rather insightful takeon Kanye's [sic] controversial persona" and said he "is removed from the vices that threaten his yearning for spirituality" when wandering the desert, as well as noting the clip's "epic quality" due to the scenes shot from above. The staff of Stereogum highlighted the video's "stuttering camera work."

The smoke machine and spotlights highlight the music video's atmosphere and visuals, being praised for its cinematography.

An alternate music video for "Can't Tell Me Nothing" was directed by American actor Michael Blieden, who shot it in NYC after receiving an email from comedian Zach Galifianakis that told him to fly there for the filming. The production was handled by Blieden and film director Inman Young. Of the video's creation, Blieden recalled him and the production team asking themselves, "What if two farmers from North Carolina set out to make their own Kanye West music video...and succeeded?" Though hiring clog dancers for the visual was Galifianakis's idea, they were tracked down by Young. West had been introduced to Galifianakis's work through his personal trainer, and eventually asked him to perform in the alternate video after attending one of Galifianakis's stand-up shows in Los Angeles. The unscripted, low-budget music video was filmed at Galifianakis's farm in North Carolina. Galifianakis admitted that he struggled to lip-sync the song's lyrics at the correct pace, as well as finding it difficult to use a tractor. On July 25, 2007, West shared the alternate music video on his website.

In the video, Galifianakis and folk singer-songwriter Will Oldham lip-sync to the song while dancing on tractors, with the two of them being surrounded by cows. Various farm-related high jinks are featured, and Galifianakis and Oldham spit gratuitously. An exploding tractor, numerous clog dancers, and hay bales are included. In one scene, the words "I Love Turd" are shown on Galifianakis's forehead while he holds a chainsaw. The alternate video was selected by Rolling Stone as the third best music video of 2007, while Pitchfork listed it as one of the top 50 videos of the year. On a list of the top 50 music videos from the 2000s decade, Pitchfork ranked the clip at number 13. At the 2009 Antville Music Video Awards, the alternate music video was nominated for Most Fun Video.

== Commercial performance ==
The song debuted at number 80 on the US Billboard Hot 100 for the issue dated June 9, 2007, standing as the third highest new entry of that week. For the same issue, the song entered at number 73 on the US Hot R&B/Hip-Hop Songs chart. It ultimately peaked at number 41 on the Hot 100 for the issue date of September 29, 2007. The song was present at number 24 on the US Hot R&B/Hip-Hop Songs chart for that week, though it rose four places to peak at number 20 on the chart the following week. On September 29, 2007, the song peaked at number eight on the US Hot Rap Songs chart. In September 2020, "Can't Tell Me Nothing" was certified triple platinum by the Recording Industry Association of America (RIAA) for selling 3,000,000 certified units in the US.

On the UK Singles Chart, the song peaked at number 107 for the chart dated June 23, 2007. As of October 24, 2019, it ranks as West's 32nd most popular track of all time on the UK Singles Chart. "Can't Tell Me Nothing" was certified platinum by the British Phonographic Industry (BPI) for shelving 600,000 units in the United Kingdom on December 22, 2023. For the issue date of September 29, 2012, the song entered at number 159 on France's SNEP chart. The following week, it rose 14 places to number 145. In December 2015, "Can't Tell Me Nothing" was certified gold by the Australian Recording Industry Association (ARIA) for shipments of 35,000 copies in Australia.

== Live performances ==
On June 1, 2007, West made a surprise appearance at DJ Gomez Warren's set in Los Angeles to play "Can't Tell Me Nothing". West performed the song as part of his set at a concert of the Live Earth event on July 7, accompanied by a string section which included female members that wore exotic face paint. On July 7 of that year, West performed the song during his appearance at the Manchester Apollo for the Manchester International Festival. For S.O.B.'s impromptu jam session in Manhattan on July 18, 2007, hosted by Hot 97, West deliver a performance of the song. West performed a medley during his in-studio appearance for MTV's Total Request Live on August 10, 2007, which consisted of the song and fellow Graduation single "Stronger". On September 11 of that year, West transitioned from a snippet of the album's track "Champion" into a performance of "Can't Tell Me Nothing" when appearing on BET's 106 & Park. West performed the song to open the 2007 BET Hip Hop Awards, surrounded by black-clad dancers who moved around similarly to ballerinas. At the launch party for the new T-Mobile Sidekick LX in Los Angeles' Griffith Park on October 17, 2007, West made a surprise appearance that included him performing the song.

During his surprise appearance at a Kid Sister concert in NYC's Museum of Natural History on January 25, 2008, West delivered a performance of the song. West performed "Can't Tell Me Nothing" as a duet with collaborator Jay-Z at the American Airlines Arena in Miami for the opening concert of the Heart of the City Tour, co-headlined by Mary J. Blige and Jay-Z, on March 22, 2008. At the opening of Murakami's exhibit in the Brooklyn Museum on April 4 of that year, West performed the song live, extending the performance into a freestyle. West and Young Jeezy performed "Can't Tell Me Nothing" together at the Philips Arena in Atlanta for the 13th annual Hot 107.9 Birthday Bash concert on June 13, 2008. During the first concert of West's conceptual Glow in the Dark Tour, an LCD screen seated behind him displayed a fiery explosion that ignited for the song's "oh" vocals while he performed. West performed the song on the final night of Lollapalooza 2008 in his hometown of Chicago, which he co-headlined with Nine Inch Nails. Dressed in an all red outfit, West performed "Can't Tell Me Nothing" during his set at Z100's the Jingle Ball concert in Madison Square Garden on December 12, 2008.

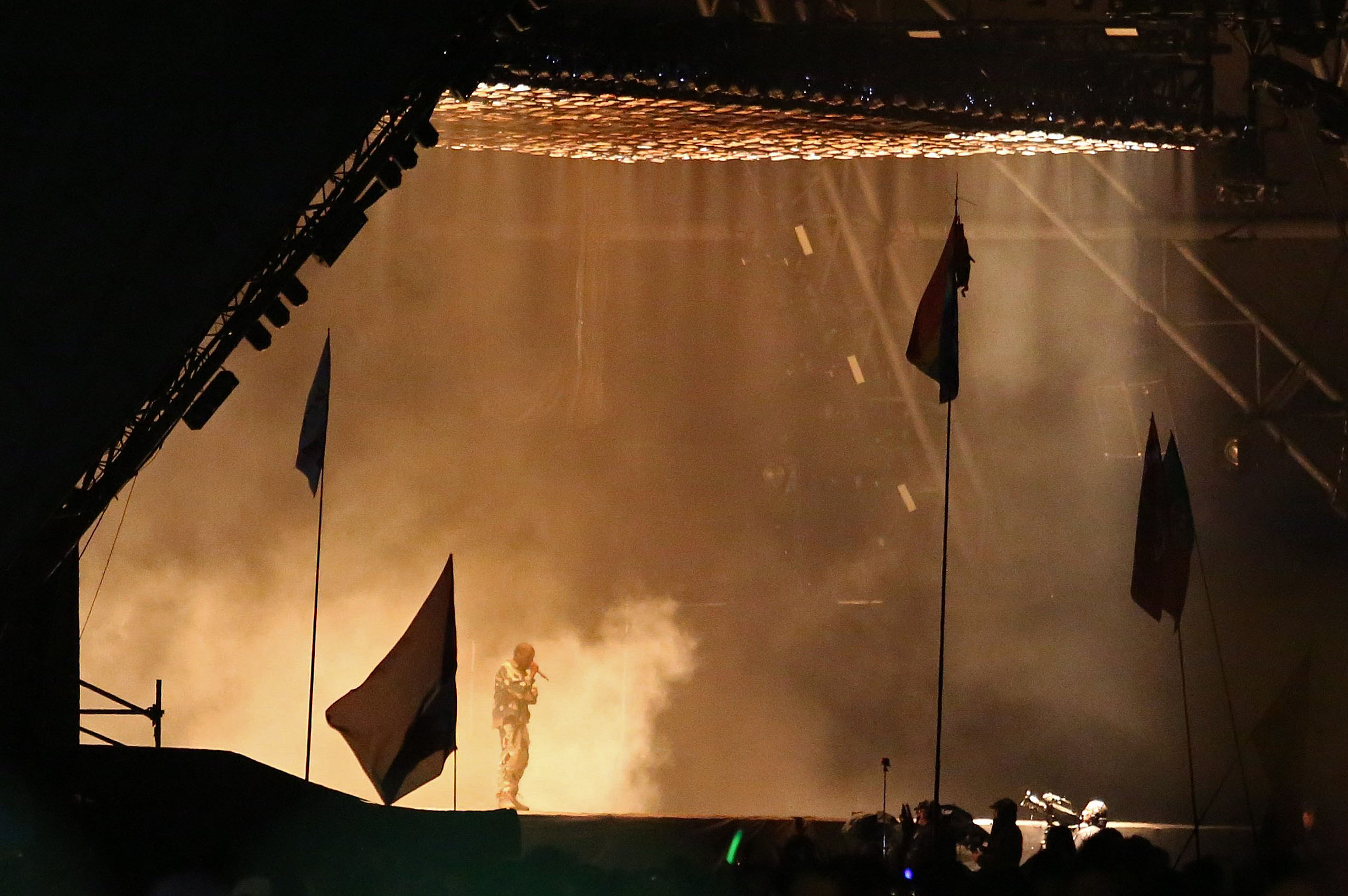
West performed the song for his headlining set at Glastonbury in 2015.

West delivered a performance of the song in Hyde Park when headlining the second and final day of the 2009 Wireless Festival. On August 6, 2009, he performed it for Casio G-Shock's the World event at Cipriani's on Wall Street, performing in front of a shifting digital display screen that counted down the time West was onstage. At the 2011 Coachella Festival, West transitioned from his single "Jesus Walks" (2004) into a performance of the song. West's dancers left the stage during the transition and for the performance, he remained at the front of the stage throughout. West headlined the 2015 Glastonbury Festival, with his set including a performance of the song. As part of West and his gospel group the Sunday Service Choir's tribute to deceased basketball player Kobe Bryant at the Super Bowl LIV in 2020, they performed the song. West and the Sunday Service Choir performed a gospel version of "Can't Tell Me Nothing" at the Credit Union 1 Arena in Chicago on February 16, 2020.

== In popular culture ==
During West's rivalry with 50 Cent that was caused by the coinciding release date of September 11, 2007 for both Graduation and 50 Cent's third studio album Curtis, West recalled "Can't Tell Me Nothing" being "the #2 song [on the radio]" in NYC at one point, while 50 Cent simultaneously had the radio's most popular song with the album's third single "I Get Money". West explained that the singles were "neck-and-neck," which he called "exciting to people." By October 2007, West recalled people comparing the song to "Spaceship" from his debut studio album The College Dropout (2004), saying people told him that both songs gave them inspiration "when they going [sic] to work." "Can't Tell Me Nothing" was included as the sixth track on the compilation album Now That's What I Call Music! 26, released on November 13, 2007 as the 26th edition of the Now series in the US.

For the soundtrack of 2009 American comedy film The Hangover, the song was included. It is played alongside a scene that sees the wolfpack driving to Las Vegas for the film's bachelor party, with the line "Wait 'til I get my money right" being part of the portion of the song which is featured. West's music was used in all of the films released as part of The Hangover trilogy, being included in the soundtrack for the second and third installments of the film series in 2011 and 2013, respectively. In an October 2013 interview on Power 106, West revealed that the track is his favorite song to have been released by him. On August 16, 2018, Kanye's wife Kim Kardashian shared a video of her playing the song to their son Saint West, who recognized it as being rapped by his father.

== Remixes and other versions ==
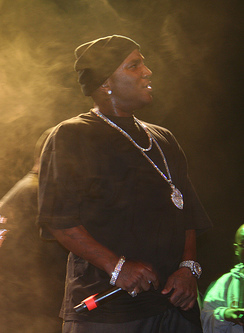
Two of the song's remixes feature Young Jeezy, and the staff of Rap-Up viewed his appearance on the official remix as appropriate.

The official remix of "Can't Tell Me Nothing", which features Young Jeezy, was released on July 25, 2007. Pimp C of American hip hop duo UGK had originally been slated to appear on the remix, though his verse was ultimately removed due to him dissing Young Jeezy in it. Speaking about the situation, Pimp C recalled promising not to "drop that shit, because Kanye told me that the song is a prayer," and a reworked version of the song's chorus was also recorded by him. Of the remix, Jay-Z said that it was used to help build up anticipation for Graduation and he also admitted that there is "a strategy involved" for putting "yourself in the best position." The remix includes a verse by Young Jeezy and new lines from Kanye West. Later in 2007, it was released on the A-side of the song's 12" vinyl, while also released as the B-side to "Good Life".

Another remix was released on August 30, 2007, with guest appearances from fellow rappers Lil Wayne and Busta Rhymes alongside Young Jeezy. It features shouting by DJs and Lil Wayne delivering instant message speak, as well as more ad-libs from Young Jeezy. The following month, the Roc-a-Fella Remix of "Can't Tell Me Nothing" was released, featuring West's labelmates Beanie Sigel, Freeway and Uncle Murda, the latter often being removed from the remix due to his verse receiving criticism. On February 7, 2009, West linked to American pop project Francis and the Lights' cover version of the song on his blog. The cover maintains the hip hop sound of the original version and the project's lead singer Francis Farewell Starlite felt that being among the artists shared via West's blog is "an honor," while he explained that covering the song "was in essence a 'call' to him" that sent a personal message about his feelings towards West's music. During Billboard's instalment of Mashup Mondays for August 8, 2011, alternative rock band Taking Back Sunday performed an acoustic cover of the song. On November 26, 2014, recorder and early woodwinds player Carlos Serrano shared a mashup of "Can't Tell Me Nothing" with English singer Sam Smith's single "I'm Not the Only One" (2014) to his SoundCloud page.

== Track listing ==
U.S. 12" vinyl'

A-side

1. "Can't Tell Me Nothing" (Album)
2. "Can't Tell Me Nothing" (Instrumental)
3. "Can't Tell Me Nothing" (Remix) (featuring Young Jeezy)

B-side

1. "Barry Bonds" (Main)
2. "Barry Bonds" (Instrumental)
3. "Barry Bonds" (Acapella)

== Credits and personnel ==
Information taken from Graduation liner notes.

Recording

- Recorded at Doppler Studios (Atlanta, GA), Sony Music Studios (NYC), The Record Plant (Hollywood, CA) and Chalice Studios (Los Angeles, CA)
- Mixed at Encore Studios (Los Angeles, CA) and Chung King Studios (NYC)

Personnel

- Kanye West – songwriter, production
- DJ Toomp – songwriter, production
- Andrew Dawson – recording, mix engineer
- Anthony Kilhoffer – recording
- Tony Rey – recording
- Mike Dean – mix engineer
- Richard Reitz – assistant mix engineer
- Bram Tobey – assistant mix engineer
- Jason Agel – assistant mix engineer
- Nate Hertweck – assistant mix engineer
- Anthony Palazzole – assistant mix engineer
- Andy Marcinkowski – assistant mix engineer
- Darryl Beaton – keyboards
- Chris Rob – keyboards
- Young Jeezy – additional vocals
- Connie Mitchell – additional vocals

== Charts ==
=== Weekly charts ===
2007 weekly chart performance for "Can't Tell Me Nothing"
Chart (2007)	Peak position
UK Singles (OCC)	107
US Billboard Hot 100	41
US Hot R&B/Hip-Hop Songs (Billboard)	20
US Hot Rap Songs (Billboard)	8
US Rhythmic Airplay (Billboard)	36

2012 weekly chart performance for "Can't Tell Me Nothing"
Chart (2012)	Peak position
France (SNEP)	145

=== Year-end charts ===
2007 year-end chart performance for "Can't Tell Me Nothing"
Chart (2007)	Position
US Hot R&B/Hip-Hop Songs (Billboard)	77

== Certifications ==
Certifications and sales for "Can't Tell Me Nothing"
Region	Certification	Certified units/sales
Australia (ARIA)	Gold	35,000^{‡}
Denmark (IFPI Danmark)	Gold	45,000^{‡}
Germany (BVMI)	Gold	150,000^{‡}
Italy (FIMI)	Gold	50,000^{‡}
New Zealand (RMNZ)	2× Platinum	60,000^{‡}
United Kingdom (BPI)	Platinum	600,000^{‡}
United States (RIAA)	7× Platinum	7,000,000^{‡}
^{‡} Sales+streaming figures based on certification alone.

== Release history ==
Release dates and formats for "Can't Tell Me Nothing"
Region	Date	Format	Label(s)	Ref.
United States	June 19, 2007	Rhythmic contemporary radio	Roc-A-Fella; Def Jam	
United States	August 7, 2007	12" vinyl	Universal	
