= Where Do I Begin =

Where Do I Begin may refer to:

== Songs ==
- "Where Do I Begin" (The Chemical Brothers song), 1997 song
- "Where Do I Begin", a song on the Sneaky Sound System album 2
- "(Where Do I Begin?) Love Story", first introduced as instrumental theme in the 1970 film Love Story
