= 2 (Sneaky Sound System album) =

Studio album by Sneaky Sound System
- Released: 16 August 2008
- Genres: Electropop; dance-pop
- Length: 40:08
- Label: Whack
- Producers: Black Angus; Donnie Sloan

Sneaky Sound System studio album chronology
Sneaky Sound System (2006)	2 (2008)	From Here to Anywhere (2011)

Singles from 2
- 1. "Kansas City" Released: 12 July 2008; 2. "When We Were Young" Released: 15 November 2008; 3. "16" Released: 14 February 2009; 4. "It's Not My Problem" Released: 4 September 2009

2 is the second studio album by Australian music collective Sneaky Sound System, released on 16 August 2008.

== Information ==
The album was produced by Black Angus and Donnie Sloan and mixed by 'Spike' Stent and Paul PDub Walton (Madonna, Björk, Massive Attack, Gwen Stefani) at Olympic Studios in London. The first single to be released from the album Kansas City was released on 12 July 2008. The album was available for pre-order on the Australian iTunes Store.

== Singles ==
1. "Kansas City" was the first single off the album, it was released on 12 July 2008. The song debuted on the Australian chart at 16 and peaked four weeks later at 14, becoming their second biggest hit after "UFO". On the twelfth week it dropped to 45 and the next week dropped out of the top 50.
2. "When We Were Young" was the second single off the album, it was released on 15 November 2008. The song did not show as much success as "Kansas City", it was their second single not to enter the top 100 after "Tease Me" but it did chart at 16 on the dance chart and 7 on the independent chart, the remix also charted at 9 in the club chart.
3. "16" was the third single off the album, it was released on 14 February 2009. The song was announced on their official website.
4. "It's Not My Problem" was the fourth and final single off the album, it was released on 4 September 2009. It has reached a peak of No. 8 on the Australian Club Chart and No. 79 on the Australian Airplay Chart.

== Track listing ==
All tracks are written by Black Angus and Miss Connie Mitchell.

2 – Standard edition
No.	Title	Length
1.	"Kansas City"	3:57
2.	"16"	3:45
3.	"When We Were Young"	3:44
4.	"It's Not My Problem"	4:53
5.	"I Just Don't Want to Be Loved"	4:23
6.	"Lost in the Future"	3:45
7.	"Because of You People Say I'm Crazy"	3:45
8.	"Don't Get You"	4:00
9.	"I Want Everything"	3:50
10.	"Where Do I Begin?"	4:06
Total length:		40:08

2 – Australian limited edition bonus disc
No.	Title	Length
1.	"UFO" (Van She Tech Remix)
2.	"Pictures" (Tonite Only Remix)
3.	"I Love It" (Bag Raiders Remix)
4.	"Goodbye" (Goodwill Darley St Remix)
5.	"Tease Me" (The Heat Remix)
6.	"Kansas City" (Tomboy Remix)
7.	"Pictures" (UK radio edit; music video)
8.	"Kansas City" (music video)

== Personnel ==
- Connie Mitchell – vocals
- Black Angus – producer
- Donnie Sloan – producer
- Mike 'Spike' Stent – mixer (track 1)
- Paul 'PDub' Walton – mixer

== Charts ==
In Australia, the album debuted at No. 1, selling 8,870 copies, beating out the previous No. 1, the Mamma Mia! soundtrack which sold 7651 copies.

=== Weekly charts ===
Chart (2008–2009)	Peak position
Australian Albums (ARIA)	1

=== Year-end charts ===
Chart (2008)	Rank
Australian Albums Chart	89
Australian Artist Albums Chart	18

== Certifications ==
Region	Certification	Certified units/sales
Australia (ARIA)	Gold	35,000^{^}
^{^} Shipments figures based on certification alone.

== Release history ==
The album was released in Australia on 16 August 2008 with a limited edition disc containing remixes from their debut album Sneaky Sound System as well as the singles from this album.

Region	Date	Label	Format	Catalogue
Australia	16 August 2008	Whack	CD, digital download	WHACK09
Australia	16 August 2008	Whack	CD	WHACK09BONUS
Australia	29 November 2008	Whack	USB	WHACK09USB
