= It's Not My Problem =

Single by Sneaky Sound System

from the album 2 & Sneaky Sound System
- Released: 25 June 2009
- Studio: Whack on Warners; Whack on Kellett
- Genre: Electropop
- Length: 4:53
- Label: Whack
- Songwriter(s): Black Angus; Miss Connie Mitchell
- Producer(s): Black Angus; Donnie Sloan

Sneaky Sound System singles chronology
| "16" (2009) | "It's Not My Problem" (2009) | "I Will Be Here" (2009) |

"It's Not My Problem" is the fourth single released by Australian band Sneaky Sound System, taken from their second Australian studio album 2 (2008) and second UK compilation album Sneaky Sound System (2009).

== Track listing ==
UK iTunes EP; Thin White Duke Remix
| No. | Title | Length |
|---|---|---|
| 1. | "It's Not My Problem" (Thin White Duke Remix Radio Edit) | 3:41 |
| 2. | "It's Not My Problem" (Thin White Duke Remix) | 7:48 |
| 3. | "It's Not My Problem" (Seamus Haji Club Mix) | 7:54 |
| 4. | "It's Not My Problem" (Seamus Haji Dub Mix) | 7:10 |
| 5. | "It's Not My Problem" (Stockholm Syndrome Remix; Radio Edit) | 3:16 |
| 6. | "It's Not My Problem" (Stockholm Syndrome Club Mix) | 7:57 |
| 7. | "It's Not My Problem" (Stockholm Syndrome Dub Mix) | 7:35 |

Australian iTunes EP
| No. | Title | Length |
|---|---|---|
| 1. | "It's Not My Problem" (Edit) | 4:05 |
| 2. | "It's Not My Problem" (Thin White Duke Remix) | 7:46 |
| 3. | "It's Not My Problem" (Jaunt Remix) | 5:25 |
| 4. | "It's Not My Problem" (Seamus Haji Remix Dub) | 7:11 |

== Charts ==
The song was the fourth most added track to the radio on 3 July 2009.

| Chart (2009) | Peak position |
|---|---|
| Australian ARIA Club Chart | 8 |
| Australian Airplay Chart | 51 |

== Release history ==
| Region | Date | Label | Format |
|---|---|---|---|
| Australia | May 2009 | Whack | Radio |
| UK | 25 June 2009 | Elmlowe, Whack | Digital download |
| Australia | 4 September 2009 | Whack | Digital download |
