= Coco's Lunch =

Australian a cappella musical group

- Origin: Melbourne, Australia
- Genre: A cappella
- Years active: 1994–present
- Members: Jacqueline Gawler; Emma Gilmartin; Gabrielle MacGregor; Lisa Young
- Past members: Sue Johnson; Nicola Eveleigh; Anita Skandarajah; Sallie Harvey
- Website: www.cocoslunch.com

Coco's Lunch is an a cappella musical group based in Melbourne, Australia. The group was founded in 1994 by vocalists and multi-instrumentalists Lisa Young (voice, percussion) and Sue Johnson (voice, percussion), with Nicola Eveleigh (voice, percussion, flute), Jaqueline Gawler (voice, percussion), and Gabrielle MacGregor (voice, percussion). The group's sound is influenced by jazz, blues, classical, African and Carnatic traditions, and has been compared to artists such as Sweet Honey in the Rock and Bobby McFerrin.

In 2003, Coco's Lunch won the award for "Best Folk/World Song" at the Contemporary A Cappella Recording Awards for "Thulele Mama Ya", from the album A Whole New Way of Getting Dressed, which in turn was runner-up for the "Best Folk/World Album" category. In the same year, their song "All the Wild Wonders", written by Sue Johnson in collaboration with author Elizabeth Honey, was nominated for the category "Most Performed Jazz Work" in the APRA Music Awards of 2003.

Coco's Lunch received nominations at the ARIA Music Awards of 2007 in the category Best Children's Album for their album Rat Trap Snap and in the category Best World Music Album for their album Blueprint. In 2015, they won the "Best Song Composed or Originally Performed by (OPB) an AUS/NZ" category of the A Cappella Recording Awards, presented by Vocal Australia, for Lisa Young's song "Other Plans", which was also nominated for the category "Best Jazz Song".

== Members ==
Current

- Jacqueline Gawler
- Emma Gilmartin
- Gabrielle MacGregor
- Lisa Young

Past

- Sue Johnson
- Nicola Eveleigh
- Sallie Harvey

Guest Members/Subs

- Libby O'Donovan
- Annemarie Sharry
- Miriam Crellin

== Discography ==
=== Albums ===
List of albums
Title	Album details
Raise The Tender Heart	Released: 1996; Label: Newmarket Music (NEW 2014.2); Formats: CD
Wally Wombat Shuffle	Released: 1998; Label: Coco's Lunch; Formats: CD
Invisible Rhythm	Released: 1999; Label: Newmarket Music (NEW 3020.2); Formats: CD
A Whole New Way of Getting Dressed	Released: 2002; Label: Newmarket Music (NEW 3097.2); Formats: CD
Blueprint	Released: 2007; Label: Sound Vault Records (SV0562); Formats: CD
Rat Trap Snap	Released: 2007; Label: Sound Vault Records (SV0571); Formats: CD
I Wanna Be A Mermaid	Released: 2012; Label: Coco's Lunch; Formats: CD, digital
Misra Chappu	Released: November 2020; Label: Coco's Lunch; Formats: CD, digital

== Awards and nominations ==
=== ARIA Music Awards ===
The ARIA Music Awards is an annual awards ceremony that recognises excellence, innovation, and achievement across all genres of Australian music. They commenced in 1987.

Year	Nominee / work	Award	Result	Ref.
2007	Blueprint	Best World Music Album	Nominated	
2007	Rat Trap Snap	Best Children's Album	Nominated	
