= 2007 ARIA Music Awards =

Annual Australian music awards ceremony

- Date: 28 October 2007
- Venue: Acer Arena, Sydney, New South Wales

Highlights
- Most wins: Silverchair (6)
- Most nominations: Sneaky Sound System (9)
- Website: ariaawards.com.au

Television/radio coverage
- Network: Network Ten

The 21st Annual Australian Recording Industry Association Music Awards (generally known as the ARIA Music Awards or simply the ARIAs) were held on 28 October 2007 at the Acer Arena at the Sydney Olympic Park complex. Rove McManus was the host of the event. The nominees for all categories were announced on 19 September, while the winners of the Artisan Awards were announced on that same day.

== Awards and nominations ==
All nominees are shown in plain, with winners shown in bold.

=== ARIA Awards ===
Album of the Year

- **Silverchair – Young Modern**
  - Gotye – Mixed Blood
  - The John Butler Trio – Grand National
  - Powderfinger – Dream Days at the Hotel Existence
  - Sneaky Sound System – Sneaky Sound System

Single of the Year

- **Silverchair – "Straight Lines"**
  - Architecture in Helsinki – "Heart It Races"
  - The John Butler Trio – "Funky Tonight"
  - Powderfinger – "Lost and Running"
  - Sneaky Sound System – "UFO"

Best Male Artist

- **Gotye – Mixed Blood**
  - Dan Kelly – Drowning in the Fountain of Youth
  - John Butler – Grand National
  - Josh Pyke – Memories & Dust
  - Paul Kelly – Stolen Apples

Best Female Artist

- **Missy Higgins – On a Clear Night**
  - Kasey Chambers – Carnival
  - Kate Miller-Heidke – Little Eve
  - Katie Noonan – "Time to Begin"
  - Sarah Blasko – What the Sea Wants, the Sea Will Have

Best Group

- **Silverchair – Young Modern**
  - Eskimo Joe – "Sarah"
  - Powderfinger – Dream Days at the Hotel Existence
  - Sneaky Sound System – Sneaky Sound System
  - Wolfmother – "Joker & the Thief"

Best Adult Contemporary Album

- **Josh Pyke – Memories & Dust**
  - Art of Fighting – Runaways
  - Lisa Miller – Morning in the Bowl of Night
  - New Buffalo – Somewhere, Anywhere
  - Paul Kelly – Stolen Apples

Best Blues & Roots Album

- **The John Butler Trio – Grand National**
  - Ash Grunwald – Give Signs
  - C. W. Stoneking – King Hokum
  - Jeff Lang and Chris Whitley – Dislocation Blues
  - Xavier Rudd – White Moth

Best Children's Album

- **The Wiggles – Pop Go the Wiggles!**
  - Bindi Irwin – Bindi Kidfitness with Steve Irwin and The Crocmen
  - Christine Anu – Chrissy's Island Family
  - Coco's Lunch – Rat Trap Snap
  - Hi-5 – Wow! (Note: Despite Hi-5's album Wow! being an official nomination for Best Children's Album, it isn't listed on the ARIA Awards website under this category.)
  - The Fairies – Fairy Beach

Best Comedy Release

- **Dave Hughes – Live**
  - Lano and Woodley – Goodbye
  - Rodney Rude – Frog Sack
  - The Twelfth Man – Boned!
  - Tripod – Songs from Self Saucing

Best Country Album

- **Keith Urban – Love, Pain & the whole crazy thing**
  - Gina Jeffreys – Walks of Life
  - James Blundell – Ring Around the Moon
  - Lou Bradley – Love Someone
  - The Greencards – Veridian

Best Dance Release

- **Sneaky Sound System – Sneaky Sound System**
  - Gotye – Mixed Blood
  - Hook 'n' Sling and Kid Kenobi – The Bump
  - poxyMusic – She Bites
  - TV Rock versus Dukes of Windsor – "The Others"

Best Independent Release

- **The John Butler Trio – Grand National**
  - Gotye – Mixed Blood
  - Hilltop Hoods – The Hard Road: Restrung
  - Sneaky Sound System – Sneaky Sound System
  - Wolf & Cub – Vessels

Best Music DVD

- **You Am I – Who Are They, These Rock Stars Live at the Mint**
  - Kisschasy – Kisschasy: The Movie
  - The Grates – Till Death Do Us Party
  - The Living End – Live at Festival Hall
  - Various – The Countdown Spectacular

Best Pop Release

- **Sarah Blasko – What the Sea Wants, the Sea Will Have**
  - Evermore – "Light Surrounding You"
  - Kate Miller-Heidke – Little Eve
  - Missy Higgins – On a Clear Night
  - Operator Please – "Just a Song About Ping Pong"

Best Rock Album

- **Silverchair – Young Modern**
  - Airbourne – Runnin' Wild
  - Grinspoon – Alibis & Other Lies
  - Jet – Shine On
  - Powderfinger – Dream Days at the Hotel Existence

Best Urban Release

- **Hilltop Hoods – The Hard Road: Restrung**
  - Bliss n Eso – Day of the Dog: Phazed Out
  - Foreign Heights – Get Yours Remix
  - Jackson Jackson – The Fire Is on the Bird
  - Justice & Kaos – Turn It On

Breakthrough Artist – Album

- **Sneaky Sound System** – **Sneaky Sound System**
  - Airbourne – Runnin' Wild
  - Expatriate – In the Midst of This
  - Josh Pyke – Memories & Dust
  - Kate Miller-Heidke – Little Eve

Breakthrough Artist – Single

- **Operator Please – "Just a Song About Ping Pong"**
  - Damien Leith – "Night of My Life"
  - Kate Miller-Heidke – "Words"
  - Small Mercies – "Innocent"
  - Something With Numbers – "Apple of the Eye (Lay Me Down)"

Highest Selling Album

- **Damien Leith – The Winner's Journey**
  - Missy Higgins – On a Clear Night
  - Human Nature – Dancing in the Street: the Songs of Motown II
  - Silverchair – Young Modern
  - The Twelfth Man – Boned!

Highest Selling Single

- **Silverchair – "Straight Lines"**
  - Natalie Bassingthwaighte and Shannon Noll – "Don't Give Up"
  - Missy Higgins – "Steer"
  - Damien Leith – "Night of My Life"
  - Wolfmother – "Joker & the Thief"

=== Fine Arts Awards ===
Best Classical Album

- **Richard Tognetti, Australian Chamber Orchestra – Bach Violin Concertos**
  - Accademia Arcadia – Trio Sonatas
  - Adelaide Symphony Orchestra, Arvo Volmer – Sculthorpe Requiem and Orchestral Works
  - Michael Keiran Harvey – Carl Vine Piano Music 1990-2006
  - Slava Grigoryan, Leonard Grigoryan – Impressions

Best Jazz Album

- **Mike Nock and Dave Liebman – Duologue**
  - Alister Spence Trio – Mercury
  - Andrea Keller Quartet – Little Claps
  - Joe Chindamo and Graeme Lyall – Smokingun
  - Mark Isaacs – Resurgence

Best Original Soundtrack / Cast / Show Album

- **Choir of Hard Knocks – Choir of Hard Knocks**
  - David Bridie – Gone
  - Monsieur Camembert – Famous Blue Cheese
  - David Bridie – The Circuit
  - Various – The Countdown Spectacular Live

Best World Album

- **Zulya and The Children of The Underground – 3 Nights**
  - Coco's Lunch – Blueprint
  - Coda – Calling Mission Mu
  - Joseph Tawadros – Epiphany
  - Not Drowning, Waving – Maps for Sonic Adventures

=== Artisan Awards ===
The Artisan Award winners were announced on 19 September. The winners are shown in bold, other nominees are in plain.

Producer of the Year

- **Wayne Connolly, Josh Pyke – Josh Pyke – Memories & Dust**
  - Nash Chambers – Kasey Chambers – Carnival
  - Magoo – Kate Miller-Heidke – Little Eve
  - Angus McDonald, Peter Dolso – Sneaky Sound System – Sneaky Sound System
  - Phillip McKellar – Something With Numbers – Perfect Distraction

Engineer of the Year

- **Wayne Connolly – Josh Pyke – Memories & Dust**
  - Doug Brady – David Campbell – The Swing Sessions
  - Magoo – Operator Please – "Just a Song About Ping Pong"
  - Paul McKercher – Sarah Blasko – What the Sea Wants, the Sea Will Have
  - Peter Dolso – Sneaky Sound System – Sneaky Sound System

Best Cover Art

- **Aaron Hayward, Dave Homer (Debaser) – Powderfinger – Dream Days at the Hotel Existence**
  - Wally De Backer – Gotye – Mixed Blood
  - John Engelhardt – Hilltop Hoods – The Hard Road: Restrung
  - Sharon Chai, Sarah Blasko – Sarah Blasko – What the Sea Wants, the Sea Will Have
  - Hackett Films – Silverchair – Young Modern

Best Video

- **Paul Goldman, Alice Bell – Silverchair – "Straight Lines"**
  - Ben Saunders, Germain McMicking – Augie March – "The Cold Acre"
  - Brendan Cook – Gotye – "Heart's a Mess"
  - Damon Escott, Stephan Lance (Head Pictures) – Powderfinger – "Lost and Running"
  - Angus McDonald, Daimon Downey – Sneaky Sound System – "Pictures"

== ARIA Hall of Fame Inductees ==
The following were inducted into the 2007 ARIA Hall of Fame on 18 July:

- Frank Ifield
- Hoodoo Gurus
- Marcia Hines
- Jo Jo Zep & The Falcons
- Brian Cadd
- Radio Birdman

Added to these inductees on 28 October, was:

- Nick Cave

Instead of a traditional acceptance speech, Cave noted that he didn't understand why he was inducted and the Bad Seeds weren't. Due to the membership of Tomas Wylder (Switzerland), Jim Sclavunos (United States), and James Johnston (UK), the band does not qualify as Australian. In rebellion against this ruling, Cave unofficially inducted Mick Harvey, Warren Ellis, Conway Savage and Martyn P. Casey of the Bad Seeds; as well as Rowland S. Howard and Tracy Pew of the Birthday Party; "by the power vested in [him] by this award". Cave did not name Hugo Race of the Bad Seeds nor Phill Calvert of The Birthday Party, who are Australian, in his unofficial induction. He did, however, close by thanking his mother, wife and sons.

== Channel V Oz Artist of the Year award ==
- Evermore
  - Silverchair
  - The Veronicas
  - Kisschasy

== Performers ==
It was announced that the following artists were the special performers of the event:

=== Main Show ===
- Powderfinger
- Silverchair
- The John Butler Trio with Keith Urban
- Missy Higgins
- Sneaky Sound System
- Gotye
- Operator Please
- Kate Miller-Heidke

=== Red-Carpet ===
- Ricki-Lee Coulter
- The Veronicas

== Controversy ==
The broadcast of the 2007 awards was controversial; it was revealed by Australian Broadcasting Corporation (ABC)'s Media Watch that Channel 10 had used subliminal advertising—which is illegal under Australian Media and Broadcasting rules—TEN disputed the finding, however their defence was also criticised by Media Watch, as demonstrating ignorance of these rules.
