= Goodbye (Sneaky Sound System song) =

Single by Sneaky Sound System

from the album Sneaky Sound System (2006)
- Released: 6 October 2007
- Studio: The House of Whack
- Genre: Electropop; house
- Length: 4:54; 3:31 (radio edit)
- Label: Whack
- Songwriters: Angus McDonald; Connie Mitchell; Daimon Downey; Peter Dolso
- Producers: Black Angus; Peter Dolso

Sneaky Sound System singles chronology
"UFO" (2007)	"Goodbye" (2007)	"Kansas City" (2008)

"Goodbye" is the sixth single by Australian dance group Sneaky Sound System, taken from their self-titled debut album Sneaky Sound System. "Goodbye" has a point of difference from the previous singles – it features lead vocals from MC Double D. It peaked at No. 33 on the ARIA Singles Chart. A new radio mix was produced for the single, removing the third verse. The extended mix retains the third verse.

== Track listing ==
Australian CD single and iTunes EP
No.	Title	Length
1.	"Goodbye" (Radio Edit)	3:31
2.	"Goodbye" (The Heat Remix)	5:44
3.	"Goodbye" (Goodwill Darley St Remix)	7:12
4.	"Goodbye" (Extended Club Mix)	5:03
5.	"Pictures" (Chris Lake Remix; iTunes-only track)	6:16
Total length:		21:30

Australian 12" vinyl
No.	Title	Length
1.	"Goodbye" (The Heat Remix)
2.	"Goodbye" (Goodwill Darley St Remix)
3.	"Goodbye" (Original)

== Personnel ==
- Black Angus – producer
- Miss Connie – vocals
- Peter Dolso – engineer, mixing, producer
- MC Double D – vocals
- Jonny Powell – remix, additional production (The Heat Remix)
- John-Paul Talbot – remix, additional production (The Heat Remix)
- Goodwill – remix, additional production (Goodwill Darley St Remix)

== Charts ==
Chart (2007)	Peak position
Australia (ARIA)	33

== Release history ==
Region	Date	Label	Format	Catalogue
Australia	6 October 2007	Whack	CD	WHACK05
Worldwide	6 October 2007	Whack	Digital download	—
Australia	30 August 2007	Whack	12" vinyl	WHACKV05
