= Sneaky Sound System (2006 album) =

Studio album by Sneaky Sound System
- Released: 12 August 2006
- Studio: The House of Whack, Bondi Beach
- Genre: Electropop; dance
- Length: 49:18
- Label: Whack
- Producer: Black Angus; Peter Dolso

Sneaky Sound System chronology
Other Peoples Music (2003)	Sneaky Sound System (2006)	2 (2008)

Singles from Sneaky Sound System
- 1. "Hip Hip Hooray" Released: 15 November 2004; 2. "Tease Me" Released: 18 July 2005; 3. "I Love It" Released: 8 July 2006; 4. "Pictures" Released: 2 December 2006; 5. "UFO" Released: 28 April 2007; 6. "Goodbye" Released: 6 October 2007

Professional ratings
Review scores
Source	Rating
AllMusic	3/5 stars

Sneaky Sound System is the self-titled debut album by Australian music collective, Sneaky Sound System, released on 12 August 2006. It peaked at No. 5 on the ARIA Albums Chart and remained in the top 50 for 61 weeks. The album was certified 3× platinum in 2011 for shipment of 210,000 copies. Six singles were released from the album, with four of them reaching the ARIA Singles Chart top 50: "I Love It" (July 2006), "Pictures" (December), "UFO" (April 2007) and "Goodbye" (October). At the ARIA Music Awards of 2007 they won Best Dance Release and Breakthrough Artist – Album for Sneaky Sound System.

== Information ==
Sneaky Sound System was released on 12 August 2006 by Australian electropop and dance music collective, Sneaky Sound System. It entered the ARIA Albums Chart at position 44 on 7 January 2007. It provided six singles with four of them reaching the top 50 on the associated singles chart: "I Love It" (July 2006), "Pictures" (December), "UFO" (April 2007) and "Goodbye" (October). "Pictures" peaked at number one on the ARIA Club Chart with its Tonite Only remix. "UFO" was their highest-charting single on the regular ARIA Singles Chart, which reached No. 11. "I Love It", which reached No. 24, remained in the top 100 for 73 weeks – the longest chart run by an Australian artist.

When the nominees for the 2007 ARIA Awards were announced Sneaky Sound System received five nominations for the album including; Best Dance Release, Best Independent Release, Breakthrough Artist – Album, Best Group and Album of the Year. At the awards ceremony, in October, they won Best Dance Release and Breakthrough Artist – Album. In the following week, the album reached its peaked position of number five on the ARIA Albums Chart and remained in the top 50 for a total of 61 weeks. The album was accredited 2× platinum by ARIA at the end of that year. In 2011 it was certified 3× platinum for shipment of 210,000 copies.

A UK compilation album was released on 20 April 2009 featuring three tracks from Sneaky Sound System and nine from their second studio album 2.

== Track listing ==
Sneaky Sound System – Standard edition
No.	Title	Writer(s)	Length
1.	"I Love It"	Angus McDonald (a.k.a. Black Angus)	3:46
2.	"Thin Disguise"	McDonald	4:34
3.	"UFO"	McDonald; Connie Mitchell	4:29
4.	"Pictures"	McDonald; Mitchell	3:16
5.	"I D E W 2 L U"	McDonald	3:33
6.	"You Should Have Told Me"	McDonald; D. Downey; O. Eser	3:55
7.	"Goodbye"	McDonald; Downey; Mitchell; Peter Dolso	4:54
8.	"Hip Hip Hooray"	McDonald	3:44
9.	"It's Over"	McDonald	3:17
10.	"You're Hot"	McDonald	5:18
11.	"Tease Me"	McDonald	3:51
12.	"Maybe"	McDonald	4:41
Total length:			49:18

Sneaky Sound System – iTunes Store bonus track
No.	Title	Length
13.	"I Love It" (Reprise)	3:42

Sneaky Sound System – Australian bonus track version
No.	Title	Length
13.	"Pictures" (Tonite Only Remix)
14.	"I Love It" (Bag Raiders Remix)
15.	"UFO" (Van She Tech Remix)

Sneaky Sound System – Collector's Edition – Disc 2
No.	Title	Length
1.	"Pictures" (Tonite Only Remix)	6:31
2.	"UFO" (Stylaz Fuego Remix)	4:02
3.	"I Love It" (Riot in Belgium Remix)	5:27
4.	"Goodbye" (Goodwill Remix)	7:12
5.	"Tease Me" (The Heat Remix)	6:08
6.	"Hip Hip Hooray" (Bag Raiders Remix)	4:43
7.	"I Love It" (Acoustic)	3:59
8.	"I Love It" (live footage)	4:22
9.	"UFO" (live footage)	4:46
10.	"Hip Hip Hooray" (live footage)	4:14
11.	"Pictures" (music video)	3:17
12.	"Goodbye" (music video)	3:31
Total length:		37:58

== Personnel ==
- Black Angus (a.k.a. Angus McDonald) – all instruments, guitars (track 7, disc 2), producer, producer (track 7, disc 2)
- Nick Broadhurst – MIDI sax (track 4)
- Alex Caradetis – drum solo (track 2)
- Miss Connie – vocals (track 7, disc 2)
- Peter Dolso – all instruments, cover art (collector's edition), engineered, mixed by, producer
- Stylaz Fuego – additional producer (track 2, disc 2), remixer (track 2, disc 2)
- Dave Glass – cover art (also on collector's edition)
- Jack Glass – additional producer (track 6, disc 2), remixer (track 6, disc 2)
- Goodwill – additional producer (track 4, disc 2), remixer (track 4, disc 2)
- Groove Terminator – additional producer (track 1, disc 2), remixer (track 1, disc 2)
- Mike Marsh – mastering
- Michael Morgan – engineer (track 7, disc 2)
- Jonny Powell – additional producer (track 5, disc 2), remixer (track 5, disc 2)
- Riot in Belgium – additional producer (track 3, disc 2), remixer (track 3, disc 2)
- Sam LA More – additional producer (track 1, disc 2), engineer (track 1, disc 2), remixer (track 1, disc 2)
- Bennie Single – cover art (also on collector's edition)
- Sloan – bass (track 7, disc 2), keys (track 7, disc 2)
- Chris Stracey – additional producer (track, disc 2), remixer (track 6, disc 2)
- John-Paul Talbot – additional producer (track 5, disc 2), remixer (track 5, disc 2)
- Van She Tech – additional producer (track 3, disc 2), remixer (track 3, disc 2)
- Rob Woolf – piano solo (track 2)

== Charts ==
=== Weekly charts ===
Weekly chart performance for Sneaky Sound System
Chart (2007–2008)	Peak position
Australian Albums (ARIA)	5

=== Year-end charts ===
Year-end chart performance for Sneaky Sound System
Chart (2007)	Rank
Australian Albums Chart	15
Australian Artist Albums Chart	6
Chart (2008)	Rank
Australian Artist Albums Chart	32

== Certifications ==
Certifications for Sneaky Sound System
Region	Certification	Certified units/sales
Australia (ARIA)	3× Platinum	210,000^{^}
^{^} Shipments figures based on certification alone.

== Release history ==
Release history and formats for Sneaky Sound System
Region	Date	Label	Format	Catalogue
Australia	16 August 2006	Whack	CD, Digital download	WHACK04
Australia	15 September 2007	Whack	CD	WHACK04X
Australia	8 December 2007	Whack	CD, digital download	WHACK04CE
