= Whack Records =

- Founded: 2003
- Founder: Daimon Downey; Angus McDonald
- Distributor(s): MGM Distribution
- Genre: Dance Music
- Country of origin: Australia
- Location: Sydney, NSW

Whack Records is an independent record label founded by members of Australian dance group, Sneaky Sound System, Daimon Downey and Angus McDonald.

== Artists ==
- Sneaky Sound System

== Discography ==
Cat. #	Artist	Title	Format	Other information
518653536	Sneaky Sound System	Sneaky Sound System (2009)	CD	LP release.
SNEAK1CD	Sneaky Sound System	Pictures (2008)	CD	Single release.
SNEAK1V1	Sneaky Sound System	Pictures (2008)	7 inch Vinyl	Single release.
SNEAK1V2	Sneaky Sound System	Pictures (2008)	12 inch Vinyl	Single release.
SNEAK2CD1	Sneaky Sound System	UFO (2008)	CD	Single release.
SNEAK2CD2	Sneaky Sound System	UFO (2008)	CD	Single release.
SNEAK2V	Sneaky Sound System	UFO (2008)	12 inch Vinyl	Single release.
WHACK01	Sneaky Sound System	Hip Hip Hooray (2004)	CD	Single release.
WHACK02	Sneaky Sound System	Tease Me (2005)	CD	Single release.
WHACK03	Sneaky Sound System	I Love It (2006)	CD	Single release.
WHACK04	Sneaky Sound System	Sneaky Sound System (2006)	CD	LP release.
WHACK04CE	Sneaky Sound System	Sneaky Sound System (2006)	CD	LP Limited edition release.
WHACK04X	Sneaky Sound System	Sneaky Sound System (2006)	CD	LP Limited edition release.
WHACK05	Sneaky Sound System	Pictures (2006)	CD	Single release.
WHACK06	Sneaky Sound System	UFO (2007)	CD	Single release.
WHACK07	Sneaky Sound System	Goodbye (2007)	CD	Single release.
WHACK08	Sneaky Sound System	Kansas City (2008)	CD	Single release.
WHACK09	Sneaky Sound System	2 (2008)	CD	LP release.
WHACK09BONUS	Sneaky Sound System	Exclusive Limited Edition Bonus Disc (2008)	CD	EP release.
WHACK09USB	Sneaky Sound System	2 (2008)	USB	LP release.
WHACK10	Sneaky Sound System	When We Were Young (2008)	CD	Single release.
WHACK11	Sneaky Sound System	Kansas City (2008)	12 inch Vinyl	Single release.
WHACK12	Sneaky Sound System	When We Were Young (2008)	12 inch Vinyl	Single release.
WHACK13	Sneaky Sound System	16 (2009)	CD	Single release.
WHACK14	Sneaky Sound System	16 (2009)	12 inch Vinyl	Single release.
WHACK15	Sneaky Sound System	It's Not My Problem (2009)	Digital download	Single release.
WHACKV02	Sneaky Sound System	I Love It – Bag Raiders Remix (2006)	12 inch Vinyl	Single release.
WHACKV03	Sneaky Sound System	Pictures (2006)	12 inch Vinyl	Single release.
WHACKV04	Sneaky Sound System	UFO (2007)	12 inch Vinyl	Single release.
WHACKV05	Sneaky Sound System	Goodbye (2007)	12 inch Vinyl	Single release.

== Numbers ==
=== Whack Numbers ===
WHACK numbers are a system by which official Sneaky Sound System releases are chronologically ordered (much like that of Nine Inch Nails' Halo system). They correspond to the sequence in which the releases were made, and are named by the word "WHACK," which precedes the number on the release. WHACK numbers are sometimes modified for alternate versions of a release, such as the multiple releases of Sneaky Sound System. Promotional-only releases do not have their own WHACK numbers.

Sneaky Sound System era (2004–2007)

- WHACK01 – "Hip Hip Hooray"
- WHACK02 – "Tease Me"
- WHACK03 – "I Love It"
- WHACK04 – Sneaky Sound System
  - WHACK04X – Sneaky Sound System – Bonus Tracks
  - WHACK04CE – Sneaky Sound System – Collector's Edition
- WHACK05 – "Pictures"
- WHACK06 – "UFO"
- WHACK07 – "Goodbye"

2 era (2008)

- WHACK08 – "Kansas City"
- WHACK09 – 2
  - WHACK09BONUS – 2, Bonus Remix Disc
  - WHACK09USB – 2, USB release
- WHACK10 – "When We Were Young"
- WHACK11 – "Kansas City" – 12" vinyl
- WHACK12 – "When We Were Young" – 12" vinyl
- WHACK13 – "16"
- WHACK14 – "16" – 12" vinyl

==== WHACKV ====
WHACKV numbers are a system by which official Sneaky Sound System vinyl releases are chronologically ordered. They correspond to the sequence in which the releases were made, and are named by the word "WHACKV," which precedes the number on the release.

Sneaky Sound System era (200?–2007)

- WHACKV01 – "???"
- WHACKV02 – "I Love It"
- WHACKV03 – "Pictures"
- WHACKV04 – "UFO"
- WHACKV05 – "Goodbye"

=== SNEAK numbers ===
SNEAK numbers are another system to catalog Sneaky Sound System releases, similar to the WHACK system used for major releases. Although it is used in the same manner as the WHACK numbers, SNEAK numbers have only seemed to be found on the UK releases.

- SNEAK1
  - SNEAK1CD – "Pictures" – CD single
  - SNEAK1V1 – "Pictures" – 7" vinyl
  - SNEAK1V2 – "Pictures" – 12" vinyl
- SNEAK2
  - SNEAK2CD1 – "UFO" – CD single
  - SNEAK2CD2 – "UFO" – CD single
  - SNEAK2V – "UFO" – 12" vinyl
