= 16 (Sneaky Sound System song) =

Single by Sneaky Sound System

from the album 2
- Released: 14 February 2009
- Recorded: at The House of Whack, Bondi
- Genre: Electropop
- Length: 3:42
- Label: Whack
- Songwriters: Angus McDonald (Black Angus), Connie Mitchell
- Producers: Black Angus & Donnie Sloan

Sneaky Sound System singles chronology
"When We Were Young" (2008)	"16" (2009)	"It's Not My Problem" (2009)

"16" is the third single by Australian dance group Sneaky Sound System, taken from their second studio album 2. It was released on 14 February 2009.

They performed the song on Australian television show Rove on 8 February 2009.

== Track listing ==
iTunes EP
No.	Title	Length
1.	"16"	3:42
2.	"16" (TV Rock Remix)	7:30
3.	"16" (Tommie Sunshine's Brooklyn Fire Re-Touch)	6:41
4.	"16" (Donnie Sloan Remix)	5:37
5.	"16" (Flight Facilities Remix)	6:19
6.	"16" (Pow!! and dMb Remix; Bonus Track)	4:34

CD single
No.	Title	Length
1.	"16" (Original)	3:42
2.	"16" (TV Rock & Luke Chable Mix)	7:29
3.	"16" (Tommie Sunshine's Class of '89 Re-Rub)	6:41
4.	"16" (Donnie Sloan Remix)	5:39
5.	"16" (Flight Facilities Remix)	6:18
Total length:		29:47

12" vinyl
No.	Title	Length
1.	"16" (TV Rock & Luke Chable Mix)
2.	"16" (Tommie Sunshine's Class of '89 Edit)
3.	"16" (Donnie Sloan Remix)
4.	"16" (Flight Facilities Remix)

== Charts ==
Chart (2009)	Peak position
ARIA Singles Chart	53
ARIA Physical Singles Chart	16
ARIA Australian Singles	10
ARIA Dance Singles	7
ARIA Club Chart ^{(A)}	4

(A) indicates TV Rock vs Luke Chapel remix.

== Release history ==
Region	Date	Label	Format	Catalogue
Australia	14 February 2009	Whack	CD, Digital download	WHACK13
Australia	18 March 2009	Whack	12" vinyl	WHACK14
