= I Love It (Sneaky Sound System song) =

Single by Sneaky Sound System

from the album Sneaky Sound System (2006) & Sneaky Sound System (2009)
- Released: 8 July 2006
- Studio: Whack on Warners
- Genre: Dance-pop; electropop
- Length: 3:50; 3:22 (UK radio/video edit)
- Label: Whack
- Songwriter(s): Angus McDonald
- Producer(s): Peter Dolso; Black Angus

Sneaky Sound System singles chronology
"Tease Me" (2005)	"I Love It" (2006)	"Pictures" (2006)

Additional cover
- UK release

Sneaky Sound System UK singles chronology
"UFO" (2008)	"I Love It" (2009)	"It's Not My Problem" (2009)

"I Love It" is the third single by Australian dance group Sneaky Sound System, taken from their self-titled debut album Sneaky Sound System (2006). The song was their first charting single, as it peaked at #24 on the ARIA Singles Chart on 7 January 2007. It also scored their first two ARIA nominations for "Best Dance Release" and "Breakthrough Artist - Single". On 4 December 2007, "I Love It" spent its 70th week in the Top 100 Singles Chart, breaking the record for the most number of weeks in the ARIA Top 100 for a single, previously held by The Living End's Second Solution / Prisoner of Society, which spent 69 weeks in the ARIA Top 100.

On 2 March 2009 it was released as the third single in the UK, taken from their self-titled UK compilation album Sneaky Sound System (2009).

== Track listing ==
Australian CD single and iTunes EP
No.	Title	Length
1.	"I Love It" (Original - Radio Edit)	3:58
2.	"I Love It" (Bag Raiders Remix)	6:27
3.	"I Love It" (Riot in Belgium Forest Rave Mix)	5:29
4.	"I Love It" (Original - DJ Friendly Edit)	4:37
5.	"I Love It" (The Video; CD-only)	4:00
Total length:		24:29

Australian 12" vinyl
No.	Title	Length
1.	"I Love It" (Bag Raiders Remix)
2.	"I Love It" (Original)
3.	"I Love It" (Riot in Belgium Forest Rave Mix)

UK promo CD
No.	Title	Length
1.	"I Love It" (Fred Falke Remix)	9:00
2.	"I Love It" (Kenny Hayes Remix)	5:35
3.	"I Love It" (Bag Raiders Remix)	6:27
4.	"I Love It" (Remi Remix)	5:28
5.	"I Love It" (Clubstar Remix)	5:42
6.	"I Love It" (Kenny Haynes Radio Edit)	3:38
7.	"I Love It" (UK Radio/Video Edit)	3:22

UK iTunes EP
No.	Title	Length
1.	"I Love It" (Full Version)	3:50
2.	"I Love It" (Fred Falke Remix)	9:00
3.	"I Love It" (Kenny Hayes Remix)	5:35
4.	"I Love It" (Bag Raiders Remix)	6:27
5.	"I Love It" (Clubstar Remix)	5:42

2018 remixes
No.	Title	Length
1.	"I Love It" (Sneaky Re-Rub)	6:34
2.	"I Love It" (Death Ray Shake Remix)	6:04
3.	"I Love It" (Superlover Remix)	6:28
4.	"I Love It" (Jordan Burns Remix)	4:31
5.	"I Love It" (Luke Million Remix)	5:26

== Music video ==
The video starts with clips of the male band members playing air instruments. Connie and 4 dancing girls appear dressed in yellow, juxtaposed with footage of Connie dressed in turquoise.

=== UK version ===
The video starts with hands grabbing items off a table, with the band's name followed by the song title appearing as watermarks in the middle of the screen. Connie is then shown sitting at the table singing the song with girls posing around her. The girls then start to tear a seated man's clothes off, before footage is shown of them dancing around the table. Connie is then shown holding the chains to two restrained male bodybuilders. Footage of posing bodybuilders is later intercut with footage of the dancing girls and Connie. The male members in Sneaky Sound System appear in the video however Connie features much more predominantly.

== Personnel ==
- Black Angus – bass, drums, guitars, keys, producer
- Peter Dolso – bass, drums, engineer, guitars, keys, mixed by, producer
- Jack Glass – additional production (track 2)
- Michael K – cover
- A. McDonald – writer
- Connie Mitchell – vocals
- Riot in Belgium – additional production (track 3), remix (track 3)
- Chris Stracey – additional production (track 2)
- Van She Tech – additional production (track 3), remix (track 3)

== Charts ==
=== Weekly charts ===
Chart (2006)	Peak position
Australian Singles Chart	24
Australian Artists Singles Chart	8
Australian Club Tracks Chart: Bag Raiders / Riot in Belgium Forest Rave Mix	2
Australian Dance Chart	5
Australian Digital Tracks Chart	45
Australian Heatseekers Chart	25
Chart (2018)	Peak position
Australian Club Tracks Chart: "I Love It 2018"	3

=== Year-end charts ===
Chart (2006)	Position
Australian Artist Singles Chart	35
Australian Club Chart	19
Australian Dance Chart	27

== Release history ==
Region	Date	Format(s)	Label(s)	Catalogue	Ref.
Australia	8 July 2006	CD	Whack	WHACK03	
Various	8 July 2006	Digital download	Whack	—	
Australia	31 July 2006	12" vinyl	Whack	WHACKV02	
UK	13 March 2009	Digital download	Elmlowe	–	
Various	9 March 2018	Digital download	Astrx	ASTRXCD173B	
