= Kansas City (Sneaky Sound System song) =

Single by Sneaky Sound System

from the album 2
- Released: 12 July 2008
- Recorded: at The House of Whack, Bondi
- Genre: Electropop, synth-pop, dance-pop
- Length: 4:29 (single version); 3:56 (album/video version)
- Label: Whack
- Songwriter(s): Angus McDonald (Black Angus), Connie Mitchell
- Producer(s): Black Angus and Donnie Sloan

Sneaky Sound System singles chronology
"Goodbye" (2007)	"Kansas City" (2008)	"When We Were Young" (2008)

"Kansas City" is the first single by Australian dance group Sneaky Sound System, taken from their second studio album 2.

The Adam Callen directed music video was nominated for Best Video at the ARIA Music Awards of 2008.

== Track listing ==
CD single / iTunes EP
No.	Title	Length
1.	"Kansas City" (Original)	4:29
2.	"Kansas City" (Lifelike Remix)	6:44
3.	"Kansas City" (Beni Remix)	5:06
4.	"Kansas City" (Tomboy Remix)	5:28
Total length:		21:46

12" vinyl
No.	Title	Length
1.	"Kansas City" (Sam la More Remix)
2.	"Kansas City" (Beni Remix)
3.	"Kansas City" (Tomboy Remix)
4.	"When We Were Young" (Shazam Remix)

== Music video ==
The music video for the song features a yellow brick road and dancing puppets including one that looks like the character of Dorothy from the Wizard of Oz. In the Wizard of Oz Dorothy Gale was from the US state of Kansas. The Kansas City most people recognize (from skyline photos and sports teams) is the city in the US state of Missouri. Still, references to Kansas City being in Kansas can be technically correct because there is a separate municipality of Kansas City, Kansas across the Kansas-Missouri border from Kansas City, Missouri.

== Charts and certifications ==
Kansas City has been the band's second highest-peaking single ever. Second after their 2007 hit "UFO" which peaked at number #11. The single certified Gold with sales of up to 35,000

=== Weekly charts ===
Chart (2008)	Peak position
Australian ARIA Singles Chart	14
Australian Airplay Chart	16
ARIA Australian Singles	3
ARIA Dance Chart	2
ARIA Club Chart	3 (*)

(*) indicates that the Club/lifelike/Tomboy/Ben's Red Eye/Sam La More mix charted

=== Year-end charts ===
Country	Chart	Ranking
Australia	ARIA End of Year Singles	87

== Release history ==
Region	Date	Label	Format	Catalogue
Australia	12 July 2008	Whack	CD, digital download	WHACK08
Australia	22 January 2009	Whack	12" vinyl	WHACK11
