= When We Were Young (Sneaky Sound System song) =

Single by Sneaky Sound System

from the album 2
- Released: 15 November 2008
- Recorded: The House of Whack, Bondi, New South Wales, Australia
- Genre: Electropop
- Length: 3:44
- Label: Whack
- Songwriters: Angus McDonald, Connie Mitchell
- Producers: Black Angus, Donnie Sloan

Sneaky Sound System singles chronology
"Kansas City" (2008)	"When We Were Young" (2008)	"16" (2009)

"When We Were Young" is the second single by Australian dance band Sneaky Sound System, taken from their second studio album 2. It was released on 15 November 2008 on Whack Records as a CD single and digital download. The song was written by band members Angus McDonald (aka Black Angus) and Connie Mitchell.

== Background ==
Sneaky Sound System's second album, 2 was released by Whack Records on 16 August 2008 and produced by band members Black Angus (aka Angus McDonald) and Donnie Sloan; it was mixed by 'Spike' Stent and Paul PDub Walton (Madonna, Björk, Massive Attack, Gwen Stefani) at Olympic Studios in London. The first single to be released from the album, "Kansas City" was released on 12 July, which peaked at #14 on the Australian ARIA Singles Chart, becoming their second biggest hit after "UFO". "When We Were Young" was the second single from the album, it was released on 15 November. The song did not show as much success as "Kansas City" and was their second single not to enter the top 100 after "Tease Me" but it did chart at #16 on the dance chart and #7 on the independent chart, the remix also charted at #9 in the club chart. "16", the third single, was released on 14 February 2009. "It's Not My Problem" was the fourth single from the album, which peaked at #8 on the Australian Club Chart, and #79 on the Australian Airplay Chart.

== Track listing ==
All tracks are written by Angus McDonald, Connie Mitchell.

CD single / iTunes EP
No.	Title	Length
1.	"When We Were Young" (Original)	3:45
2.	"When We Were Young" (Sinden Remix)	5:11
3.	"When We Were Young" (Juan Maclean Remix)	8:26
4.	"When We Were Young" (Breakbot Remix)	4:02
5.	"When We Were Young" (Gloves Remix)	5:02
Total length:		26:24

12" vinyl
No.	Title	Length
1.	"When We Were Young" (Goodwill Remix)
2.	"When We Were Young" (Sinden Remix)
3.	"When We Were Young" (Juan McLean Remix)
4.	"When We Were Young" (Breakbot Remix)

== Charts ==
Year	Chart	Peak position
2008	ARIA Physical Singles Chart	#46
2008	ARIA Dance Chart	#16
2008	ARIA Club Chart	9 (1)
2008	Australian Independent Records Single Chart	#7

(1) indicates that The Goodwill/Breakbot/Gloves mix charted.

== Release history ==
Region	Date	Label	Format	Catalogue
Australia	15 November 2008	Whack	CD, Digital download	WHACK10
Australia	22 January 2009	Whack	12" vinyl	WHACK12
