= Hip Hip Hooray (song) =

Single by Sneaky Sound System

from the album Sneaky Sound System
- Released: 15 November 2004
- Recorded: July 2004
- Studio: Whack on Warners, Bondi
- Length: 3:45
- Label: Whack
- Songwriter(s): Black Angus
- Producer(s): Black Angus; Peter Dolso

Sneaky Sound System singles chronology
"Hip Hip Hooray" (2004)	"Tease Me" (2005)

"Hip Hip Hooray" is the first single by Australian dance group Sneaky Sound System, it was released on 15 November 2004 well ahead of their self-titled debut studio album, Sneaky Sound System (August 2006). Founding mainstay, Black Angus (Angus McDonald) wrote the track, and contributed guitar, keyboards, bass guitar, drums and lead vocals. It appeared on the ARIA Singles Chart Top 100.

== Track listing ==
CD single and iTunes EP
No.	Title	Length
1.	"Hip Hip Hooray" (Original – Radio Edit)	3:45
2.	"Hip Hip Hooray" (PoxyMusic Handstand Remix)	5:41
3.	"You're Hot" (Za Sneaky Hot Tub Dub)	6:54
4.	"Hip Hip Hooray" (Ajax & Da Hoodrat's Bang Gang Remixxx)	5:21
5.	"Hip Hip Hooray" (Accapella)	3:41
Total length:		25:23

== Personnel ==
- Black Angus – bass, drums, guitars, keys, mixed by, producer, rework by (track 3), vocals, writer
- Miss Annie – backup vocals
- Pip Edwards – backup vocals
- Michael K – Design
- Ken Cloud – additional production (track 2)
- Dolso – bass, drums, engineer, guitars, keys, mixed by, producer, rework by (track 3)
- MC Double D – backup vocals
- Pocket – additional production (track 2)

== Charts ==
Chart (2005)	Peak position
Australian Singles Chart	78
Australian Heatseekers Chart	3

== Release history ==
Region	Date	Format(s)	Label(s)	Catalogue	Ref.
Australia	15 November 2004	CD	Whack	WHACK01	
Various	15 November 2004	Digital download	Whack	—	
