= Pictures (song) =

Single by Sneaky Sound System

from the album Sneaky Sound System (2006) & Sneaky Sound System (2009)
- Released: 2 December 2006
- Studio: Whack on Warners
- Genre: Electropop
- Length: 3:16
- Label: Whack
- Songwriters: Angus McDonald; Connie Mitchell
- Producers: Black Angus; Peter Dolso

Sneaky Sound System singles chronology
"I Love It" (2006)	"Pictures" (2006)	"UFO" (2007)

Additional cover
- UK release

Sneaky Sound System UK singles chronology
"Pictures" (2008)	"UFO" (2008)

"Pictures" is the fourth single by Australian dance group Sneaky Sound System, taken from their self-titled debut album Sneaky Sound System (2006). The song was written by Connie Mitchell and Angus McDonald and came second in the Dance/Electronica category of the 2007 International Songwriting Competition.

The Angus McDonald and Daimon Downey directed music video was nominated for Best Video at the ARIA Music Awards of 2007.

It was released on 21 July 2008 in the UK as the first single, taken from their self-titled second UK compilation album Sneaky Sound System (2009). It debuted at 95 then rose the next week to 76.

== Track listing ==
Australian CD single and iTunes EP
No.	Title	Length
1.	"Pictures" (Original)	3:21
2.	"Pictures" (Tonite Only Remix)	6:33
3.	"I Love It" (Original)	3:49
4.	"Pictures" (Acappella)	3:27
5.	"Pictures" (Video; CD-only)	3:13
Total length:		20:24

Australian 12" vinyl
No.	Title	Length
1.	"Pictures" (Tonite Only Remix)
2.	"Pictures" (Extended Mix)

UK CD and 2008 iTunes single
No.	Title	Length
1.	"Pictures" (UK Radio Edit)	3:16
Total length:		3:16

2008 iTunes EP
No.	Title	Length
1.	"Pictures" (South Central Remix)	5:03
2.	"Pictures" (Tonite Only Remix)	6:30
3.	"Pictures" (UK Extended Mix)	4:35
4.	"Pictures" (Chris Lake Remix)	6:16
5.	"Pictures" (Digital Dog Poolside Dub)	6:03

UK 7" vinyl
No.	Title	Length
1.	"Pictures" (UK Radio Edit)
2.	"Pictures" (South Central Remix)

UK 12" vinyl
No.	Title	Length
1.	"Pictures" (UK Extended Mix)
2.	"Pictures" (Tonite Only Remix)

2017 digital download
No.	Title	Length
1.	"Pictures 2017" (Dom Dolla Remix)	4:46
2.	"Pictures 2017" (Colour Castle Remix)	4:45
3.	"Pictures 2017" (Mall Grab Remix)	7:23
4.	"Pictures 2017" (Sneaky Sundays Remix)	6:39

== Personnel ==
- Black Angus – all instruments, producer
- Nick Broadhurst – midi sax
- Miss Connie – vocals
- Peter Dolso – all instruments, producer, mix, engineer
- Sam LA More – remix, additional production, engineer (Tonite Only Remix)
- Groove Terminator – remix, additional production (Tonite Only Remix)

== Charts ==
=== Weekly charts ===
Chart (2006–08)	Peak position
Australian Singles Chart	19
Australian Artists Singles Chart	6
Australian Club Tracks Chart: Tonite Only mix	1
Australian Dance Chart	4
Australian Digital Tracks Chart	22
UK Singles Chart: UK mix	76
Chart (2017)	Peak position
Australian Club Tracks Chart: "Pictures 2017"	2

=== Year-end charts ===
Chart (2006)	Position
Australian Top Club Tracks Chart	24
Chart (2007)	Position
Australian Singles Chart	53
Chart (2017)	Position
Australian Top Club Tracks Chart: "Pictures 2017"	26

== Certifications ==
Region	Certification	Certified units/sales
New Zealand (RMNZ)	Gold	15,000^{‡}
^{‡} Sales+streaming figures based on certification alone.

== Release history ==
Region	Date	Format(s)	Label(s)	Catalogue	Ref.
Australia	2 December 2006	CD	Whack	WHACK05	
Various	2 December 2006	Digital download	Whack	—	
Australia	11 December 2006	12" vinyl	Whack	WHACKV03	
Various	11 July 2008	Digital download	Elmlowe	—	
Various	18 July 2008	Digital download	Elmlowe	—	
United Kingdom	21 July 2008	CD	14th Floor; Whack	SNEAK1CD	
United Kingdom	21 July 2008	7-inch vinyl	14th Floor; Whack	SNEAK1V1	
United Kingdom	21 July 2008	12" vinyl	14th Floor; Whack	SNEAK1V2	
Various	8 September 2017	Digital download	Astrx	ASTRXCD157	
