= Sneaky Sound System =

Australian dance group

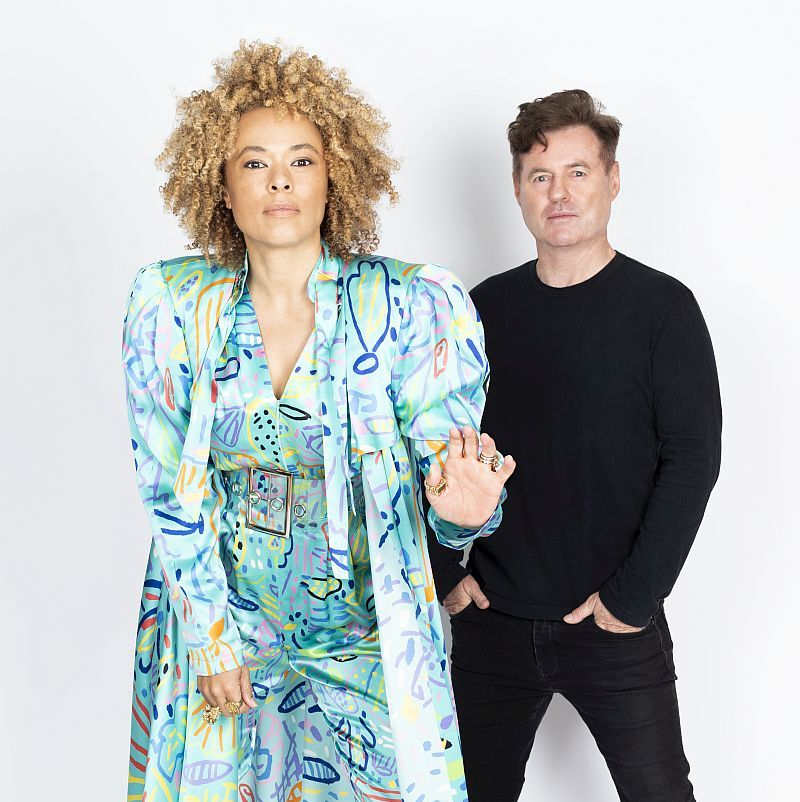
- Sneaky Sound System – Connie Mitchell and Angus McDonald

Background information
- Origin: Sydney, New South Wales, Australia
- Genres: Dance, electro house, electropop
- Years active: 2001–present
- Labels: Sony, Whack, 14th Floor, Modular, Cr2
- Members: Angus McDonald; Connie Mitchell
- Past members: Donnie Sloan (Jonathan Sloan); Damian Hess; MC Double D (Daimon Downey); Tricky Nick (Nick Broadhurst); Peter Dolso
- Website: sneakysoundsystem.com

Sneaky Sound System is an Australian dance music group formed in late 2001 by Angus McDonald on guitar, MC Double D (Daimon Downey) on vocoder and vocals, Damien Hesse (DJ) and Nick Broadhurst on saxophone. They were joined in 2004 by Connie Mitchell (ex-Primary) on vocals; Downey left the band in September 2009, Hesse in 2005 and Broadhurst in 2006. On 12 August 2006, they released their self-titled debut studio album, which peaked at No. 5 on the ARIA Albums Chart in mid-November 2007 and was certified 3× platinum by December 2011, denoting shipments of 210,000 copies. The group's breakthrough single, "I Love It", which was issued on 8 July 2006, peaked at No. 24 on the ARIA Singles Chart and spent 73 weeks in the Top 100 – this broke the record as the longest charting single previously held by The Living End's 1997 hit, "Second Solution / Prisoner of Society", at 69 weeks. Their second studio effort, 2, which appeared on 16 August 2008, became their first number-one album. On 7 October 2011, From Here to Anywhere was released and reached at No. 11. At ARIA Music Awards ceremonies they have been nominated fourteen times winning twice in 2007 for Best Dance Release and Breakthrough Artist – Album for their eponymous album.

== History ==
=== 2001–2005: Early years ===
In late 2001, Sneaky Sound System was formed in Sydney as hosts to dance music parties, Sneaky Sundays. Angus McDonald had met MC Double D (Daimon Downey) at a fancy dress party in 2000 and the pair soon became flatmates. Angus was working as a DJ with Damien Hesse and invited D to MC at their regular Sunday parties. Hesse explained their concept "We wanted to start a Sunday night, our own night in Sydney, because we didn't feel we fit into anything else that was going on ... We played for over a year to over 100 people in a basement in Bondi so it was very much an underground thing". Various live musicians would perform irregularly with Sneaky Sound System, the group added cabaret elements including specialist dancers. With Angus on guitar and D on vocoder and vocals, they began gigging at various clubs and festivals along the Australian east coast. They recorded a remix album, Other Peoples Music, produced and engineered by Peter Dolso. The double CD was released on 3 October 2003 by Sony Music Australia. The line-up for the album included Angus, D, Hesse (as a remixer) and Tricky Nick (Nick Broadhurst) on saxophone.

In 2004, Sneaky Sound System established its own label, Whack Records. Angus recalled being rejected by recording companies when proposing an album of original material, "We were told by every label we might sell 10,000 copies and it wasn't worth it ... so we decided to do it ourselves". On 15 November that year, they issued their debut single, "Hip Hip Hooray", on their label and distributed by MGM Distribution. Angus wrote the track, and contributed guitar, keyboards, bass guitar, drums and lead vocals. It appeared on the ARIA Singles Chart Top 100. In late May, Hesse indicated that a new album was due later that year. However, he left soon after and the group decided that they required a female vocalist, Angus and D met Connie Mitchell (ex-Primary) by chance in a public park as she sat singing and playing guitar to a friend. They asked her to join as lead vocalist, Mitchell later remembered, "I thought they were a bit dodgy ... You know, two guys coming up to you, excited, jumping around a bit, saying 'Come to our studio'". Their second single, "Tease Me", had been recorded before Mitchell joined with lead vocals by D and guest vocalist Pepper (Pip Edwards), it appeared on 18 July 2005, but did not chart.

=== 2006–2007: Sneaky Sound System ===
Mitchell provided lead vocals on Sneaky Sound System's breakthrough single, "I Love It", which was issued on 8 July 2006. It peaked at No. 24 and spent 73 weeks in the Top 100. This broke the record as the longest charting single by an Australian artist on the ARIA Singles Chart – previously held by The Living End's "Second Solution/Prisoner of Society" (1997) at 69 weeks.

On 12 August 2006, Sneaky Sound System released their self-titled debut studio album, which was produced by Angus and Dolso and included the three earlier singles, "Hip Hip Hooray", "Tease Me" and "I Love It". At the ARIA Music Awards of 2006, "I Love It" received two nominations: 'Break Through Artist – Single' and 'Best Dance Release'. The band were awarded with 'Best Performing Independent EP/Single' and 'Best Independent Artist' at the 2007 Australian Independent Record (AIR) Awards

At the 2007 ARIA Awards, the group won two categories, 'Best Dance Release' and 'Breakthrough Artist – Album' from nine nominations. In late October, the album was at No. 37 but with their ARIA wins it reached the peak of No. 5 within three weeks, in mid-November. Sneaky Sound System remained in the Top 50 for a total of sixty-one weeks, it was certified ×3 platinum by December 2011, denoting shipments of 210,000 copies.

In December 2006, they supported Robbie Williams on the Australian leg of his Close Encounters Tour. Mitchell has appeared on albums by Kanye West, Snoop Dogg and Rick Ross. In addition to their own headline tours, Sneaky Sound System have supported Jamiroquai, Scissor Sisters, Sam Sparro, and Lady Gaga. They appeared at festivals including Electric Picnic, Wireless, Global Gathering, Get Loaded in the Park and Oxegen (Ireland), Zomerparkfeest and Mysterylands (Netherlands), Big Day Out, Homebake, Good Vibrations Festival, Live Earth, V Festival, Splendour in the Grass, Stereosonic, MS Fest and Hot BBQ (Australia). They have performed in New Zealand, the United States, Russia, Italy, Spain and Canada. The group's next single, "Pictures", was released on 2 December 2006, which reached No. 19. The remix version by Tonite Only peaked at number one on the ARIA Club Tracks Chart for a record-equalling thirteen weeks.

"Pictures" came second in the Dance-Electronica category of the 2007 International Songwriting Competition. The fifth single from the album, "UFO", was released in April, which reached No. 11, is their highest single peak. The last single from the album, "Goodbye", was released in October, which peaked at No. 33, almost three years after the first single. During November that year the band embarked on its first major tour, 2007: A Spaced Out Odyssey, the five dates began on 9 November at the Brisbane Convention & Exhibition Centre and ended on 17 November at Sydney's Hordern Pavilion. The September 2009 version of the tour also included international shows in Auckland, London, Madrid and Barcelona.

=== 2008–2010: 2 ===
At the beginning of 2008, Sneaky Sound System began work on their second studio album, 2, which appeared on 16 August 2008 and became their first number-one album. On 12 July 2008 Sneaky Sound System released the first single from the album, "Kansas City", which peaked at No. 14. Their second single, "When We Were Young", was released on 15 November, which reached No. 46 on the ARIA Physical Singles chart and No. 16 on their Dance Chart.

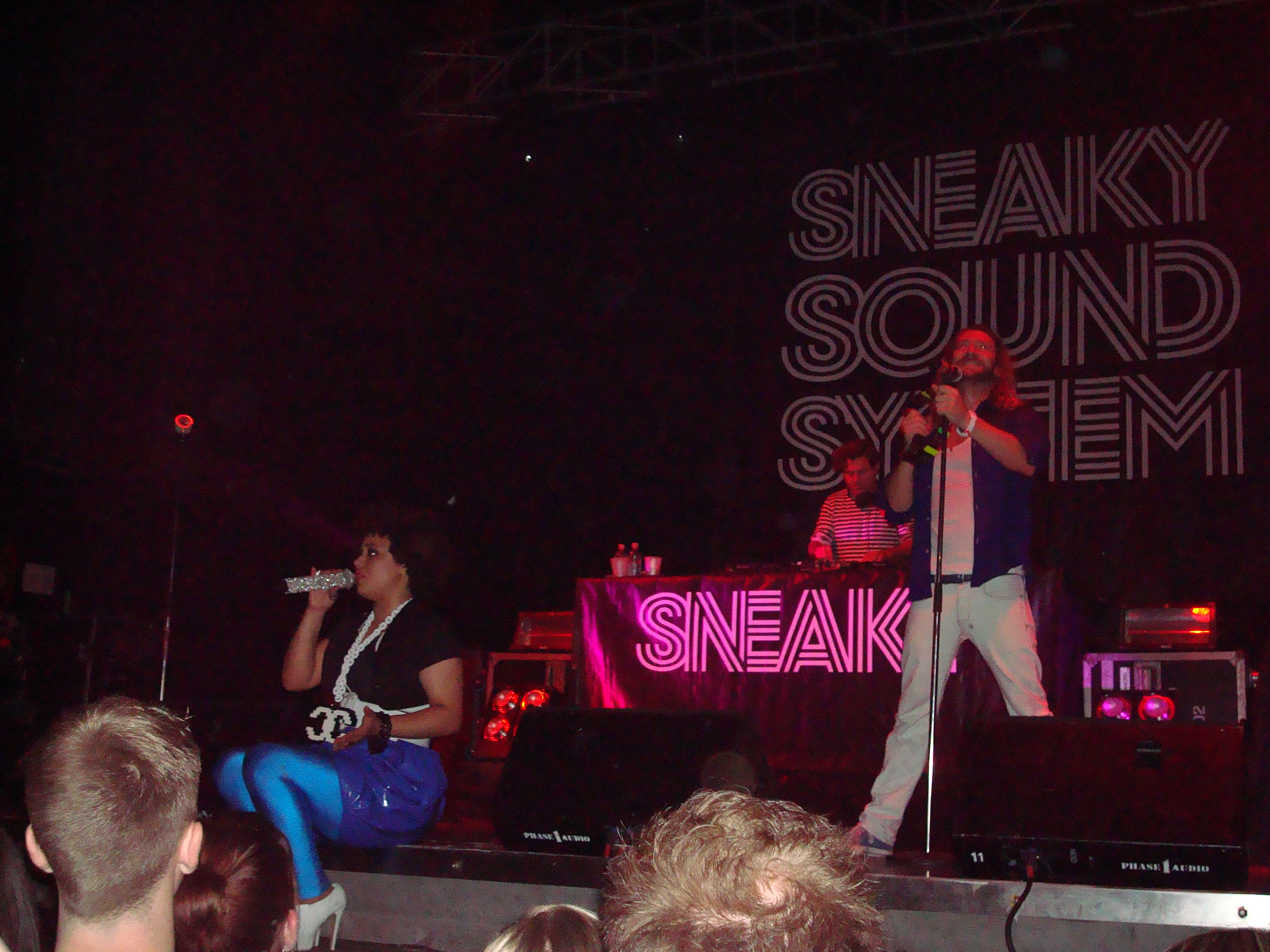
Sneaky Sound System's three-piece line-up on their Poptronica Tour with (left to right): Connie Mitchell, Angus McDonald and MC Double D. Metro City, Perth, May 2009.

The third single from the album, "16", was released on 14 February 2009, and reached No. 4 on the ARIA Club Chart. The fourth single, "It's Not My Problem", was released on 4 September, the Thin White Duke remix of this track spent three weeks in the top 10 of the ARIA Club Chart, and in the UK it reached No. 1 on both the UK Music Week and DMC club charts in June 2009. In the UK, they released "Pictures" as their first single in July 2008. It peaked at No. 76 on the UK Singles Chart. They toured there including appearing at Glastonbury, Oxegen and performing on BBC Radio 1. Their second UK single, "UFO", reached No. 52. Before the UK release of 2, they issued a compilation album via iTunes, Sneak Preview – Mixes and Remixes, on 15 December 2008.

In January 2009, Sneaky Sound System were one of the headline acts at the annual Big Day Out Festival, playing in Auckland, Gold Coast, Sydney, Melbourne, Adelaide and Perth. Prior to 2's release in the United Kingdom, early in 2009, they had signed to an independent UK label, 14th Floor Records. They toured there including appearing at Glastonbury, Oxegen and performing on BBC Radio 1. Their first UK headline tour began on 8 March 2009 in Glasgow and finished in London on 11 March. Early that year, 2 became their first album issued on the UK market. On 17 February 2009, they announced their Australian national headlining Poptronica Tour. They toured Australia and New Zealand from 2 April 2009 in Brisbane and finished on 22 May in Broome. In June 2009, they toured the US for the first time. At the APRA Music Awards of 2009 they were nominated for Dance Work of the Year for "Kansas City". Angus and Mitchell collaborated with Dutch musician, Tiësto, on his single "I Will Be Here", and played with him at the Victoria Park Concert in London on 31 July. "I Will Be Here" reached No. 1 in the US on Billboard's Dance Radio Airplay Chart in November. In 2010 Sneaky Sound System were nominated for another APRA Dance Work of the Year Award, this time for "16".

On 10 September 2009, Daimon Downey, aka MC Double D, announced he was leaving Sneaky Sound System to pursue other interests. According to Downey, "To leave Sneaky Sound System was tough, and was one of the most thought-out decisions of my life to date. The reasons, some personal and some obvious (hotels and airports) were decisions made in my own pursuit of happiness". Angus stated in an interview that the band would remain as a duo and that they were due to work on a new album. In December 2010, Downey, as a mixed media visual artist, had his first solo exhibition of sculpture and paintings in Potts Point. Zac Bayly of Pages described Downey's work, "instead of throwing shapes on stage, he's slapping them down on canvas. As an artist, [he] uses mixed media to create vibrant, strange artworks designed to communicate his own weird and wonderful mind-scapes". By the middle of that month, Sneaky Sound System had been collaborating with Jay-Z, Kanye West and Beyoncé for Jay-Z and Kanye's album Watch the Throne (2011).

=== 2011–2013: From Here to Anywhere ===
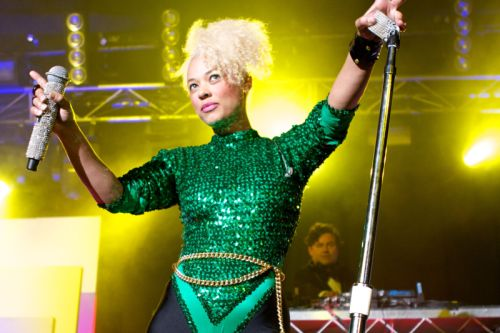
Mitchell and Angus (in background and partly obscured) performing, July 2011.

In March 2011, Sneaky Sound System toured Europe for gigs in London, Russia, and Naples; they also performed in Dubai. In April, they travelled to Paris and London to film the video for their next single, "We Love". On 27 May, their third studio album, From Here to Anywhere's first single, "We Love", debuted on Australian radio show, The Kyle and Jackie O Show. It reached No. 29 on the ARIA Singles Chart. On 7 October 2011, From Here to Anywhere, was released in Australasia through the Modular label and on 17 October for Worldwide markets. The album peaked at No. 11 on the ARIA Albums Chart. That month, they travelled to Las Vegas to film the video for the album's second single, "Big", then played shows at Ministry of Sound in London, Pacha, in Ibiza, and the Homelanz festival in London. In September they played shows in Vladivostok, Ibiza, Isle of Wight and Berlin. In November, they returned to Europe for shows in London and Limerick; and then to Dubai and Nizhny Novgorod, Russia.

The album's third single, 'Really Want to See You Again', was released on 9 March 2012. In March 2012, Sneaky Sound System had travelled to Miami for the Winter Music Conference. They played the Subliminal Records party at Amnesia with Erick Morillo. In April, they played Sydney, Melbourne, Brisbane and Perth for the From Here to Anywhere Tour. In June, they played their first-ever shows in Seoul (Club Answer) and Tokyo (Club Ageha). "Friends" followed on 20 July, accompanied by a video shot in Tokyo, filmed and directed by Mitchell and starring Angus. Also that month, they returned to Europe for shows in Mykonos, Ibiza, Toulouse, Naples, Serbia, Milano Marittima, London and Moscow. In August, they played shows in Canada and the US.

=== 2013–present ===
In April 2013, Connie Mitchell was a mentor to Seal's artists on the Australian version of The Voice. The same month, in a peer-voted survey conducted by Melbourne's Herald Sun newspaper, Connie was named number 18 on a list of Australia's greatest singers of all time.

During 2013 the group indicated on their Facebook page that they were working on a number of collaborations. The first of these was a track with US duo The Knocks, called "The One". It appears on the EP Comfortable, released on 18 February 2014. In May 2014, Noir Records released a track "This Feeling", accredited to Larse and Sneaky Sound System.

In late 2015 and with little fanfare, Sneaky Sound System put out two club tracks on limited release—"Summertime Madness" and "All I Need".

In April 2016, the group released "I Ain't Over You" and accompanying video, which they called "their first proper music video in four years". On 18 April the track debuted at No. 3 on the AIR charts chart.

In August 2017, a two-track EP including "Do Ya Thing" and "I Like Techno" was released on Club Sweat/Sweat It Out Records. The video accompanying "Do Ya Thing" was directed by fellow Bondi Beach local, Carla Uriarte.

In September 2017, on TMRW Music (formerly Ministry of Sound), new remixes of "Pictures" were released by Mall Grab, Dom Dolla, Colour Castle together with a Sneaky Sundays remix. These mixes reached No. 2 on the ARIA Club Chart. February 2018 saw the release of new remixes of "I Love It" from Death Ray Shake, Jordan Burns, Superlove and Luke Million. These mixes spent four weeks at No. 3 on the ARIA Club Chart.

In July 2018, their single "Can't Help the Way That I Feel" was released on Cr2 Records. Featuring an interpolation of an excerpt from "Love Come Down", written by Kashif and originally recorded by Evelyn "Champagne" King, the song reached No. 1 on the UK Music Week Upfront Club Chart in December 2018.

July 2019 saw the release of a single, "We Belong", also on Cr2 Records. On 18 July, Beatport named Sneaky Sound System their Artist of the Week.

April 2020 brought the release of the single "Tell The World", a collaboration with French DJ producer Norman Doray, and in August 2023, "Fire Keeps Burning", a collaboration with Swedish producer John Dahlbäck.

== Controversies ==
=== Albury Hotel Incident ===
In late 2007 Sneaky Sound System performed in Albury for Groovin' the Moo music festival and stayed overnight at the Chifley Hotel. After their stay however they were accused of having left the room in a damaged state, with hotel management claiming that they had "smashed" a bed, covered walls in graffiti and ripped flyscreens off the windows. The damage bill was reportedly $1,000. The following day the local newspaper ran this story as front-page news, despite a historic win in the Australian federal election for the Labor Party the day previously. The band's management responded, confirming that a crew member was fired over the incident and claimed that the band itself had no knowledge of the incident.

A few months later, Mitchell was participating in an interview with British music magazine TNT and was questioned about the incident. She repeated sentiments that the event had been blown out of proportion, claiming: "Albury–Wodonga had only one hotel and relied on sheep-shearing", suggesting that it was a case of a small country town looking to stir up drama and grab the spotlight. These comments were published and made their way back to residents of the regional centre who took issue with this mischaracterisation, as the town at this point had more than a dozen hotels and a varied economy, acting as a centre for tertiary education, manufacturing and tourism.

Mitchell put out an apology to the residents of Albury, which read: "It seems we have really set off on the wrong foot. I apologise unreservedly for the negative comments that were published in the TNT magazine in Britain. It was never my intention to upset anyone and I truly regret this situation. I hope we can get over this hurdle, you can accept my apology and we can get back on the right foot."

She also hit back at the initial accusations, claiming that the Chifley Hotel had admitted to, and apologised for, spreading misinformation about the original event. In a statement to the local newspaper The Border Mail, Julia Davis (the band's booking agent) corroborated this: "There is a group of bands who… take a painting off the wall at every hotel they stay at and draw a painting behind it... It's like a cult thing." Many residents, including Albury's Mayor, Stuart Baker, were satisfied by this apology with some expressing that the town's response to the perceived reckless behaviour was counterproductive.

== Band members ==
=== Current members ===
- Angus McDonald – songwriting, production, guitar, keyboards, bass guitar, drums (2001–present)
- Connie Mitchell – vocals, songwriting (2005–present)

=== Former members ===
- Damien Hesse – DJing, remixing (2001–2005)
- MC Double D (Daimon Downey) – vocoder, vocals (2001–2009)
- Tricky Nick (Nick Broadhurst) – saxophone (2001–2006)
- Peter Dolso – guitar, keyboards, bass guitar, drums (2003–2004)

== Discography ==
=== Studio albums ===
- Sneaky Sound System (2006)
- 2 (2008)
- From Here to Anywhere (2011)

== Awards and nominations ==
=== AIR Awards ===
The Australian Independent Record Awards (commonly known informally as AIR Awards) is an annual awards night to recognise, promote and celebrate the success of Australia's Independent Music sector.

Year	Nominee / work	Award	Result
2007	themselves	Best Independent Artist	Won
2007	Sneaky Sound System	Best Performing Independent Album	Nominated
2007	Sneaky Sound System	Best Independent Dance/Electronic Album	Nominated
2007	"UFO"	Best Performing Independent Single / EP	Won
2007	"I Love It"	Best Performing Independent Single / EP	Nominated
2007	"Pictures"	Best Performing Independent Single / EP	Nominated
2008	"Kansas City"	Best Independent Single / EP	Won
2008	2	Best Performing Independent Album	Nominated

=== APRA Awards ===
The APRA Awards are presented annually from 1982 by the Australasian Performing Right Association (APRA) to "honour those composers and songwriters who have achieved the highest performances of their work and excellence in their craft over the previous year". Sneaky Sound System have been nominated five times in the related category of Dance Work of the Year (earlier known as Most Performed Dance Work).

Year	Nominee / work	Award	Result
2007	"I Love It" (Angus McDonald) – Sneaky Sound System	Most Performed Dance Work	Nominated
2008	"Pictures" (Angus McDonald, Connie Mitchell) – Sneaky Sound System	Dance Work of the Year	Nominated
2008	"UFO" (Angus McDonald, Connie Mitchell) – Sneaky Sound System	Dance Work of the Year	Nominated
2009	"Kansas City" (Angus McDonald, Connie Mitchell) – Sneaky Sound System	Dance Work of the Year	Nominated
2010	"16" (Angus McDonald, Connie Mitchell) – Sneaky Sound System	Dance Work of the Year	Nominated
2013	"Really Want To See You Again" (Angus McDonald, Connie Mitchell) – Sneaky Sound System	Dance Work of the Year	Nominated

=== ARIA Awards ===
The ARIA Music Awards are presented annually from 1987 by the Australian Recording Industry Association (ARIA) to recognise "excellence and innovation in all genres of Australian music". Sneaky Sound System have won two awards from fifteen nominations.

Year	Nominee / work	Award	Result
2006	"I Love It"	Breakthrough Artist – Single	Nominated
2006	"I Love It"	Best Dance Release	Nominated
2007	Sneaky Sound System	Album of the Year	Nominated
2007	Sneaky Sound System	Best Dance Release	Won
2007	Sneaky Sound System	Best Group	Nominated
2007	Sneaky Sound System	Best Independent Release	Nominated
2007	Sneaky Sound System	Breakthrough Artist – Album	Won
2007	"UFO"	Single of the Year	Nominated
2007	Angus McDonald, Peter Dolso – Sneaky Sound System – Sneaky Sound System	Producer of the Year	Nominated
2007	Peter Dolso – Sneaky Sound System – Sneaky Sound System	Engineer of the Year	Nominated
2007	Angus McDonald, Daimon Downey – Sneaky Sound System – "Pictures"	Best Video	Nominated
2008	Adam Callen – Sneaky Sound System – "Kansas City"	Best Video	Nominated
2009	2	Best Dance Release	Nominated
2009	2	Best Independent Release	Nominated
2012	Angus McDonald, Connie Mitchell – Sneaky Sound System – "From Here to Anywhere"	Best Dance Release	Nominated

=== Other awards ===
Award	Category	About	Result
2007
MTV Australia Video Music Awards	Best Dance Video – Pictures	Themselves	Nominated
Nickelodeon Australian Kids' Choice Awards	Fave Band	Themselves	Nominated
2008
MTV Australia Awards	Australian Artist Music Award	Themselves	Nominated
2009
MTV Australia Awards	Best Dance Video	"Kansas City"	Nominated
MTV Australia Awards	Independent Spirit	Themselves	Won
