= UFO (Sneaky Sound System song) =

Single by Sneaky Sound System

from the album Sneaky Sound System (2006) & Sneaky Sound System (2009)
- Released: 28 April 2007
- Studio: The House of Whack
- Genre: Dance-pop, electro house
- Length: 4:29; 4:03 (UK mix)
- Label: Whack
- Songwriters: Angus McDonald; Connie Mitchell
- Producers: Black Angus; Peter Dolso

Sneaky Sound System singles chronology
"Pictures" (2006)	"UFO" (2007)	"Goodbye" (2007)

Sneaky Sound System UK singles chronology
"Pictures" (2008)	"UFO" (2008)	"I Love It" (2009)

"UFO" is the fifth single by Australian dance group Sneaky Sound System, taken from their self-titled debut album Sneaky Sound System (2006). It peaked at #11 on the ARIA Singles Chart. The song was certified Platinum in Australia, with sales of 70,000.

At the AIR Awards of 2007, it won Best Performing Independent Single / EP.

It was released as the second UK single, taken from their self-titled UK compilation album Sneaky Sound System (2009).

== Track listing ==
=== Australian CD single ===
1. "UFO (Radio Edit)" – 3:46
2. "UFO (Extended Club Mix)" – 6:24
3. "UFO (Van She Tech Remix)" – 4:45
4. "UFO (Donnie Sloan Remix)" – 5:04
5. "UFO (A Capella)" – 5:01

== Remixes ==
=== Sneaky Sound System Mixes ===
- “UFO (Radio Edit)” – 3:45
- “UFO (Album Version/Video Edit)” – 4:29
- "UFO (Extended Club Mix)" – 6:24
- “UFO (Acapella)” – 5:00
- “UFO (UK Radio Mix)” – 3:45
- “UFO (UK Album Version)” – 4:03
- "UFO (12" Super Extended Mix)" – 6:00

=== Bimbo Jones Mixes ===
- "UFO (Bimbo Jones Club Mix)" – 7:56
- "UFO (Bimbo Jones Twist Mix)" – 7:53
- "UFO (Bimbo Jones Twist Dub)" – 7:53

=== Van She Mix ===
- "UFO (Van She Tech Remix)" – 4:45

=== Donnie Sloan Mix ===
- "UFO (Donnie Sloan Remix)" – 5:04

=== Will Crate Mix ===
- "UFO (Goodwill Mix)" – 7:34

== Personnel ==
- Black Angus – all instruments, producer
- Felix Bloxsom – live drums
- Miss Connie – vocals
- Peter Dolso – all instruments, producer, engineer, mix
- Donnie Sloan – remix and additional production
- Van She Tech – remix and additional production

== Charts ==
=== Weekly charts ===
Chart (2007)	Peak position
Australia (ARIA)	11

=== Year-end charts ===
Chart (2007)	Position
Australia (ARIA)	29

== Release history ==
Region	Date	Label	Format	Catalogue
Australia	28 April 2007	Whack	CD; digital download	WHACK06
Australia	23 April 2007	Whack	12" vinyl	WHACKV04
Australia	12 May 2007	Whack	Digital download	–
UK	17 November 2008	14th Floor; Whack	CD; Digital download	SNEAK2CD1
UK	17 November 2008	14th Floor; Whack	CD	SNEAK2CD2
UK	17 November 2008	14th Floor; Whack	Digital download	–
UK	17 November 2008	14th Floor; Whack	12" vinyl	SNEAK2V
