= Chain gang (disambiguation) =

A chain gang is a system of labor (usually forced) that involves groups of prisoners chained together doing menial labor.

Chain gang may also refer to:

- Chain gang (cycling), a group of cyclists in a close-knit formation, normally for the purposes of training
- Chain crew or chain gang, the officials on the sidelines of an American football game who carry the first-down indicators connected by chains
- Chain ganging, an elevated probability for inter-state conflict

== Literature ==
- "Chain Gang", a 1978 poem by Patti Smith from Babel

== Film, radio and television ==
- The Chain Gang (1930 film), a film by Walt Disney starring Mickey Mouse
- Chain Gang (1950 film), a film by Lew Landers and starring Douglas Kennedy
- Chain Gang (1984 film), a 3D film
- The Chain Gang (radio series), a British radio series
- "Chain Gang" (Only Fools and Horses), an episode of Only Fools and Horses

== Music ==
- Chain Gang (band), an experimental punk rock band from New York City
- Chaingang, an Australian rock band
- "Chain Gang" (Sam Cooke song), a 1960 song by Sam Cooke
- "Chain Gang" (1955 song), recorded by Bobby Scott and Jimmy Young
- "Chain Gang", a song by the Blue Hearts on the b-side of "Kiss Shite Hoshii"
- The Chain Gang, a Scottish charity supergroup who released the 1987 single "Makin' Tracks"

== See also ==
- "Back on the Chain Gang", a song by the Pretenders
- I Am a Fugitive from a Chain Gang, a 1932 American film
- "Livin' on a Chain Gang", a song by Skid Row
- The Chain Gang of 1974, an indietronica project of Kamtin Mohager
