= Leave It Alone (Operator Please song) =

2007 single by Operator Please

Single by Operator Please

from the album Yes Yes Vindictive
- B-side: "Mister Mister" (live demo)
- Released: 19 November 2007
- Length: 3:38 (album version); 3:33 (radio edit)
- Label: Brille
- Songwriter: Operator Please
- Producer: Simon Barnicott

Operator Please singles chronology
"Get What You Want" (2007)	"Leave It Alone" (2007)	"Two for My Seconds" (2008)

"Leave It Alone" is a song by Australian band Operator Please. It was released in the United Kingdom on 19 November 2007 as the third single from their debut album, Yes Yes Vindictive, and was released in Australia on 25 February 2008. The song peaked at number 62 on the Australian ARIA Singles Chart, number 32 on the Top 100 Physical chart, and number 14 on the Australian Artists chart.

== Music video ==
The music video was directed by Duncan Skiles. The video premiered on Operator Please's official website on 31 October.

The video opens up with all band members playing their instruments in a warehouse. At the beginning of the chorus, the keyboardist, Sarah Gardiner, and the lead singer, Amandah Wilkinson, begin to fight. As Wilkinson hits Gardiner in the mouth, yellow paint pours out of her mouth. The bassist, Ashley McConnell, begins to fight Wilkinson as well during the chorus. Wilkinson wins while green paint pours out of her mouth. For the second chorus the violinist, Taylor Henderson, begins to fight Wilkinson and Henderson punches Wilkinson in the mouth and pink paint pours out of her mouth. Wilkinson then punches Henderson in the mouth and orange blood pours out. During the bridge, it shows various shots of all members getting punched except for Tim Commandeur. Commandeur then uses his crash cymbal from his drum set and uses them as Frisbees and cuts off Henderson's hand and McConnell's foot. He then chucks his drum sticks at Gardiner and they go through her eyes. Wilkinson then rips off Commandeur's arm as blue blood pours out. Henderson then uses her remaining arm to make her violin as a bow and arrow which then stabs Wilkinson in the stomach. For the conclusion of the video, it shows all members dead on the floor.

== Track listings ==
Australian CD single

1. "Leave It Alone" (radio edit) – 3:34
2. "Leave It Alone" (album version) – 3:41
3. "Mister Mister" (live demo) – 2:22
4. "Leave It Alone" (New Young Pony Club remix) – 4:49
5. "Leave It Alone" (David E. Sugar remix) – 4:52

UK CD single

1. "Leave It Alone" (radio edit)
2. "Leave It Alone" (album version)
3. "Leave It Alone" (live)
4. "Leave It Alone" (music video)
5. "Crash Tragic"
6. "Icicle"

UK 7-inch single

1. "Leave It Alone" (New Young Pony Club mix) – 4:49
2. "Leave It Alone" (David E. Sugar's St. Marks mix) – 4:52

UK iTunes CD single

1. "Leave It Alone" (radio edit)
2. "Leave It Alone" (New Young Pony Club Mix)

== Charts ==
Chart (2008)	Peak position
Australia (ARIA)	62
Australian Physical Singles (ARIA)	32
Australian Artist Singles (ARIA)	14
