= Amandah Wilkinson =

New Zealand-born musician

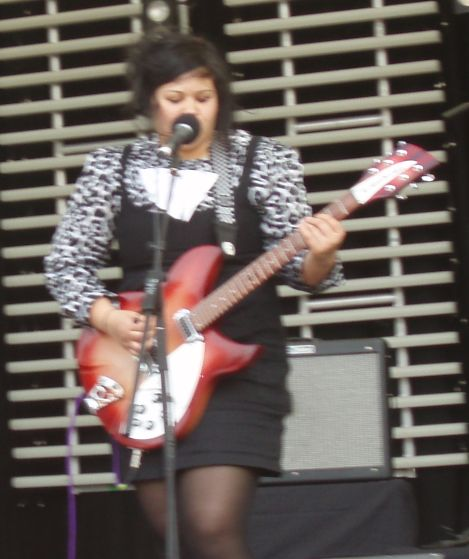
- Fronting Operator Please, Falls Festival, Tasmania, December 2007

Background information
- Born: 1987 or 1988 (age 37–38); New Zealand
- Origin: Gold Coast, Queensland, Australia
- Genres: Indie rock; indie pop; pop rock
- Occupations: Musician; producer
- Instruments: Vocals; guitar
- Years active: 2006–present
- Label: Double-A Side
- Formerly of: Operator Please

Amandah Wilkinson (born 1987 or 1988) is a New Zealand-Australian pop musician from the Gold Coast, Queensland. She was the founding mainstay lead singer and guitarist of Operator Please from 2005 to 2011, which released two studio albums before splitting. Wilkinson went solo as Bossy Love in 2011 and used the same name when forming a duo in 2013 with John Baillie Jnr, ex-lead vocalist and drummer of Scottish pop-rock group Dananananaykroyd (2006–2011). As from 2016 they are based in Glasgow and released their debut album, Me + U, in October 2019 via Double-A Side Records.

== Biography ==
Amandah Wilkinson was born in New Zealand to an Indonesian mother and an English father. She was raised in New Plymouth and Christchurch with an older sibling, whom she describes as "a huge influence, musically and artistically." In 1997 the family moved to Australia and settled on the Gold Coast, Queensland. After seeing American musical comedy film, Josie and the Pussycats (2001), and listening to its related soundtrack, Wilkinson decide to pursue a career in pop music.

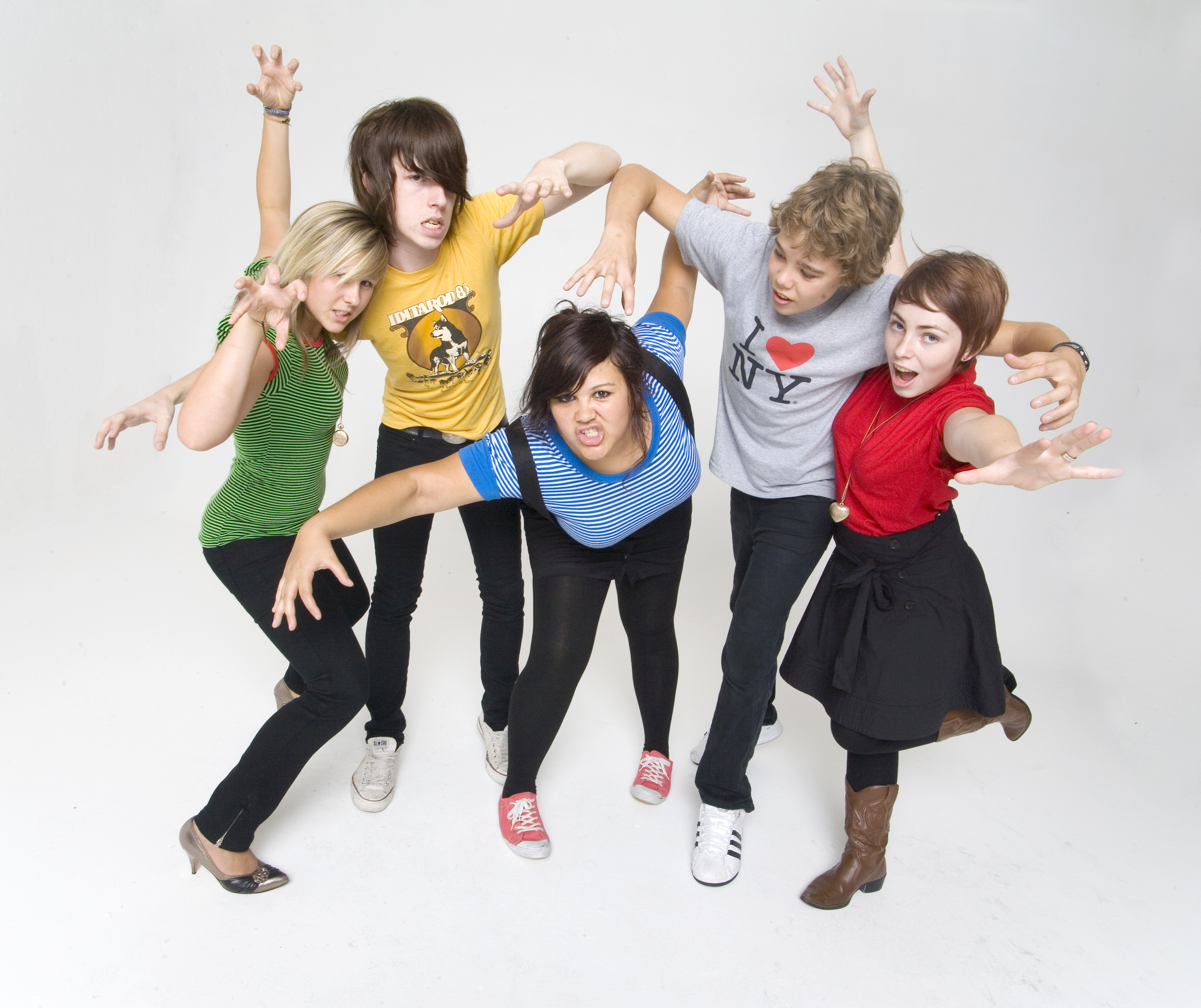
Wilkinson (centre) as a member of Operator Please, February 2007

While a secondary student at Elanora State High School in 2005 she canvassed fellow students to form a teen pop group, Operator Please. Alongside Wilkinson on lead vocals and guitar were Tim Commandeur on drums, Sarah-Jane Gardiner on keyboards, Stephanie Joske on violin and Ashley McConnell on bass guitar, who were all aged from 17 to 19. They entered and won a local Battle of the Bands competition, soon after Joske was replaced by Taylor Henderson on violin. As a member of Operator Please, Wilkinson co-wrote most of their tracks for both studio albums, Yes Yes Vindictive (2007) and Gloves (2010), and the associated singles and extended plays. She also co-produced Gloves with Justin Tresidder.

While Operator Please were supporting English band the Futureheads in 2008 in Dundee, Wilkinson met the lead vocalist and drummer John Baillie Jnr of fellow support act, Dananananaykroyd. When her group had ended in 2011 Wilkinson started performing as Bossy Love and issued a single, "Fight This Off", which featured rapping by Kween G (Giladesi Namokoyi) in December. Wilkinson moved to London in 2012 to continue writing material. She sent one of her tracks to Baillie in Glasgow and he produced a recording for her. The pair continued collaborating and Bossy Love became a duo in 2013.

While living in London Wilkinson also worked for the railways, on weekends she would travel to Glasgow to perform and co-write with Baillie. Their debut mixtape, Hollidates, appeared in November 2014. After Bossy Love achieved a residency at the Bongo Club, Edinburgh, Wilkinson relocated to Glasgow. The duo released a single, "Want Some", in March 2016. In August 2017 they performed at the Belladrum Festival. Bossy Love issued their debut album, Me + U, on 31 October 2019 via Double-A Side Records. Max Sefton of The Skinny observed, "[it's] the work of a talented duo but it's surely a record that will win them many more friends and admirers." Me + U was short-listed for the 2020 Scottish Album of the Year Award.
