= On the Prowl =

On the Prowl may refer to:

- On the Prowl (Loudness album), released in 1991
- On the Prowl (Steel Panther album), released in 2023
- On the Prowl (EP), an EP by Australian band Operator Please
- On the Prowl (film series), a series of pornographic films starring Jamie Gillis
- "On the Prowl" (song), a 1976 song by Australian band Ol' 55
