= For a Good Time, Call... =

2012 film by Jamie Travis

- Theatrical release poster
- Directed by: Jamie Travis
- Written by: Katie Anne Naylon; Lauren Anne Miller
- Produced by: Katie Anne Naylon; Lauren Anne Miller; Josh Kesselman; Jen Weinbaum
- Starring: Ari Graynor; Lauren Anne Miller; Mark Webber; Justin Long
- Cinematography: James Laxton
- Edited by: Evan Henke
- Music by: John Swihart
- Production company: AdScott Pictures
- Distributed by: Focus Features
- Release dates: January 26, 2012 (Sundance); August 31, 2012 (United States)
- Running time: 85 minutes; 87 minutes (unrated cut)
- Country: United States
- Language: English
- Budget: $1.3 million
- Box office: $1.4 million

For a Good Time, Call... is a 2012 American comedy film directed by Jamie Travis. It stars Ari Graynor, Lauren Anne Miller, Mark Webber, and Justin Long, with Sugar Lyn Beard, Mimi Rogers, Nia Vardalos, and James Wolk in supporting roles. The film premiered at the Sundance Film Festival on January 26, 2012, where it secured a worldwide distribution deal with Focus Features. It was released theatrically in the United States on August 31, 2012.

== Plot ==
After Lauren is dumped by her boyfriend Charlie, she is unable to afford a place of her own. Her friend Jesse tells her of a beautiful apartment overlooking Gramercy Park, not mentioning his other friend Katie lives there. During their freshman year of college 10 years earlier, while Lauren was reluctantly driving an inebriated Katie home from a frat party, Katie accidentally spilled her own urine onto Lauren from an empty cup, prompting Lauren to throw Katie out of the car. Despite their clear disdain for each other, they move in together for lack of better options.

One night, Lauren hears strange noises from Katie's room. Believing she is being attacked, she opens the door to find Katie having a sexually explicit conversation on the phone. Katie explains she works as a phone sex operator, as her writing does not earn her enough money to live in New York City. Lauren is disgusted, but makes some suggestions on how to make more money.

Some time later, Lauren loses her publishing job when her boss retires. Encouraging Katie to obtain a landline, 1-900-MMM-HMMM, Lauren becomes her business manager as they go into business for themselves, which proves much more lucrative. In a few weeks, they make $12,000, of which Lauren gets a third, which increases when she becomes a phone operator herself. In the process, they become close friends.

Katie has a regular customer named Sean and their calls become less about phone sex and more about becoming acquainted with one another. They agree to meet, but accompanied by Lauren and Jesse, who are concerned he might be a rapist. However, they discover they are very well-suited to each other and begin a relationship. This leaves Katie feeling distressed as she confesses to Lauren that she is a virgin and has been lying for years to cover up her insecurities.

Lauren lands an interview at a prestigious publishing company that previously rejected her, and Katie convinces her to attend the interview to blow them off. She tells them she has been running a phone sex line all summer, and she is offered the job as they feel she has business savvy. Concerned about long-term prospects, Lauren accepts, which angers Katie to the point where she reveals their business to Lauren's conservative parents. Lauren moves out and they stop speaking.

Lauren meets with Charlie, who has returned from a business trip to Italy and declares that he made a mistake in breaking up with her. He reveals that he had a passionate love affair with a fiery Italian woman, but he eventually realized he needs someone boring, predictable, and simple—the same reasons he dumped Lauren. She stands up for herself and leaves Charlie for good.

Meanwhile, Katie and Sean decide to have sex, and in order to calm their nerves, they talk on the phone while lying next to each other in bed. When they are finished, Katie feels sad that she cannot share this news with Lauren, whom she loves. Sean encourages her to call her, and they declare that they "think" they love each other.

Lauren and Katie call each other at the same time, engaging in a phone conversation full of unintentional innuendo before they meet each other on the street and hug. Lauren moves back in with Katie, who joyfully reveals that she has just lost her virginity.

== Cast ==
- Ari Graynor as Katie Steele
- Lauren Anne Miller as Lauren Powell
- James Wolk as Charlie
- Nia Vardalos as Rachel Rodman
- Mimi Rogers as Adele Powell
- Don McManus as Scott Powell
- Sugar Lyn Beard as Krissy
- Mark Webber as Sean
- Justin Long as Jesse
- Kevin Smith as a cabbie
- Seth Rogen as Captain Jerry
- Ken Marino as Harold
- Martha MacIsaac as an inmate

== Production ==
Lauren Anne Miller and Katie Anne Naylon based the script on their real-life experiences as college roommates.

The role of Katie was written specifically for Ari Graynor. Miller used her performance in Nick & Norah's Infinite Playlist (2008) as the inspiration for writing the character, and wrote Graynor a letter asking her to be involved in the production. The letter made Graynor cry. "I got this letter where they talked about what fans they were of my work and how they felt like I was one of the only people out there who could be both sexy and vulnerable and funny all at the same time," she stated.

Principal photography took place over 16 days in Los Angeles and New York City with a budget of $1.3 million. Miller and Naylon secured financing for the film independently. Focus Features picked up the film at the 2012 Sundance Film Festival for $2 million. James Schamus, chief executive at Focus, cited the film's "emotionally generous" appeal and word-of-mouth potential as primary reasons for the acquisition.

== Soundtrack ==
The soundtrack for the film was released by Lakeshore Records on August 28, 2012.

1. "Back and Forth" – Operator Please
2. "I Promise" – Generationals
3. "Come Alive" – Hanni El Khatib
4. "Stick Together" – Mack Winston & The Reflections
5. "Side Saddle" – People Get Ready
6. "Black Water" – The Dig
7. "By Your Hand" – Los Campesinos!
8. "He Knew" – Chalk & Numbers
9. "Operator" – Mary Wells
10. "Flowers Bloom" – High Highs
11. "Come Come" – Hot as Sun
12. "Black Water" – Timber Timbre

== Home media ==
For a Good Time, Call... was released on DVD and Blu-ray on January 22, 2013. The DVD features an audio commentary by director Jamie Travis, writer Katie Anne Naylon, and stars/producers Miller and Graynor, five deleted scenes, and a "look inside" featurette.

== Reception ==
For a Good Time, Call... received generally mixed reviews from critics. On the review aggregator website Rotten Tomatoes, the film holds an approval rating of 57% based on 106 reviews, with an average rating of 5.6/10. The website's critics consensus reads, "Brisk, funny, and sweetly raunchy, For a Good Time, Call... adds to the recent string of R-rated female comedies while serving as an overdue coming out party for the charming Ari Graynor." Entertainment Weekly wrote, "It's Ari Graynor's movie—she's like Kate Hudson possessed by the spirit of Bette Midler. And all the better off for it." Roger Ebert gave the film 2 stars out of 4, writing, "The screenplay by Miller and Katie Anne Naylon excels in its mastery of filthy talk, which is delivered with such velocity and mastery that the movie shows every sign of considering it funny. The performances by Miller and Graynor are high-spirited enough that you yearn to see them in worthier material. The potential is there."
