= Colour Coding =

Australian indie pop band

- Origin: Sydney, Australia
- Genres: Alternative rock, indie pop
- Years active: 2011–2013
- Labels: Inertia, Cosine Records (US)
- Past members: Chris Holland; Tim Commandeur

Colour Coding was an Australian indie pop band officially formed in 2011 and based in Sydney. The band was formed by Chris Holland and Tim Commandeur, both members of the group Operator Please; after Operator Please's second album, cousins Holland and Commandeur began writing as Colour Coding. The band released its first EP Proof in March 2012 with the lead single "Perfect" uploaded as a free track online in November 2011.

== Early life ==
At ages 12 and 13, cousins Chris and Tim recorded an extended play in Tim's father's mark studio. In 2005, Tim joined the pop group Operator Please with several of his Gold Coast schoolmates, including founder and lead vocalist Amandah Wilkinson. In 2008, Chris joined the band as keyboardist.

This early experience helped the boys realize their dream of forming their own band, Colour Coding.

== 2011–present: Proof ==
In September 2011, Hoppy Studios (Sydney) produced their first single, "Perfect". It was a free-to-download online release track. The track was then added to the fourth digital release by New York label Cosine Records in the US.

In March 2012, the duo released their debut extended play (EP) recorded at Sydney's Hurley Studios, titled Proof and introduced their first concerts.

On 30 November 2013, the duo announced on their official Facebook page that they would be entering a hiatus.

== Discography ==
EPs

- Proof (2012)
- Proof Remixed (2012)

Singles

- "Perfect" (2011)
- "Hold Tight" (2012)
- "Yours, Not Mine"/"Hanging On" (2013)
