= Lauren Miller Rogen =

American actress (born 1982)

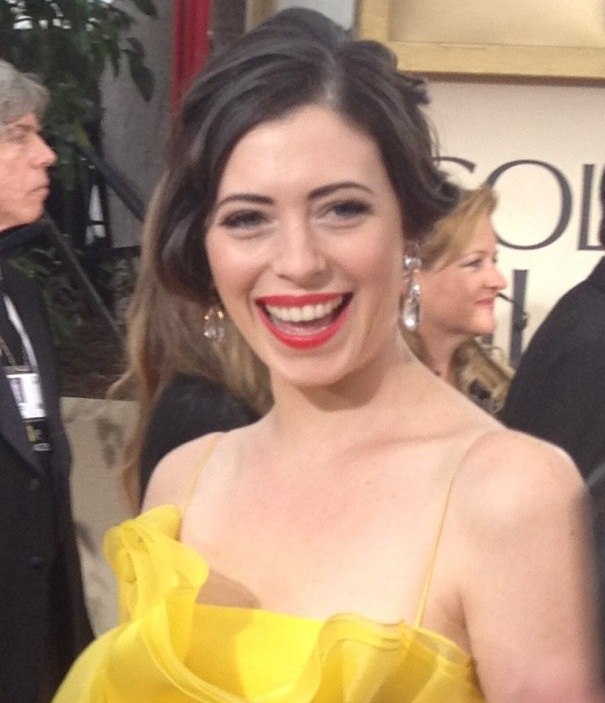
- Rogen in January 2012
- Born: Lauren Anne Miller; July 24, 1982 (age 44); Long Island, New York, U.S.
- Other name: Lauren Miller
- Education: Florida State University
- Occupations: Actress; screenwriter; director
- Years active: 2003–present
- Spouse: Seth Rogen (m. 2011)

Lauren Anne Miller Rogen (née Miller; born July 24, 1981) is an American actress, comedian, screenwriter, and director. She has appeared in the films Superbad (2007), Zack and Miri Make a Porno (2008), and 50/50 (2011).

In 2012, she starred in the film For a Good Time, Call..., which she also co-wrote and produced, and in 2018 made her directorial debut with Like Father.

== Early life ==
Miller was born on Long Island, New York, and raised in Lakeland, Florida. She is the daughter of Adele (1951–2020) and Scott Miller, and has a brother, Danny. Miller is Jewish.

In 2003, Miller graduated from the Florida State University College of Motion Picture Arts. It was there that she met Katie Anne Naylon, the college roommate with whom Miller would later co-write For a Good Time, Call..., based on their personal experiences.

== Career ==
At the beginning of her career, Miller performed supporting roles in several of Seth Rogen's films, including Superbad, Zack and Miri Make a Porno, Observe and Report, and 50/50.

Her first leading film role was opposite Ari Graynor in the comedy that Miller co-wrote and produced, For a Good Time, Call.... Rolling Stone quipped, "In a rare instance of truth in advertising, the movie actually is a good time." Focus Features picked up the rights to the film at the 2012 Sundance Film Festival for about $2 million and released it in the United States on August 31, 2012. Miller was also in two episodes of FOX comedy Ben and Kate. More recently she has pivoted from acting to directing and writing.

== Personal life ==
Miller began dating actor Seth Rogen in 2004. They were engaged on September 29, 2010, and married on October 2, 2011. They have stated they do not plan to have children.

In 2012, Miller and Rogen founded the non-profit organization Hilarity for Charity to raise awareness and fund research towards Alzheimer's disease. The disease runs in her family, including her mother who was diagnosed at the age of 55.

== Filmography ==
=== Film ===
Year	Title	Role	Notes
2003	Leaving Baghdad		Short film; Producer and editor
2003	Happy Holidays		Short film; Director and writer
2004	Straw Hat		Short film; Costume Designer
2004	My People the Manatee		Short film; Producer
2004	Measure of Love		Short film; Director and writer
2005	The Unseen Kind-Hearted Beast		Short film; Producer
2006	Monster House		Assistant to Steve Starkey
2007	Beowulf		Assistant to Steve Starkey
2007	Superbad	Scarlett Brighton	
2008	Zack and Miri Make a Porno	Moaner and Groaner	
2009	Observe and Report	Trina	
2010	The Josh and Adam Show: Beach Day	Science Girl #1	Short film
2011	Girls! Girls! Girls!		Writer
2011	50/50	Bodie	
2011	Long Black Lashes	Courtney	Short film
2012	For a Good Time, Call...	Lauren Powell	Also co-writer and producer
2012	The Perfect Fit		Short film; Co-writer
2014	Someone Marry Barry	Leslie - Speed Dater	
2014	Growing Up and Other Lies	Emma	
2016	Sausage Party	Camille Toh, tampon	Voice role
2018	Like Father	Tired Woman	Also director, screenwriter, and producer
2021	Phobias	Emma	
TBA	Babies		Director, screenwriter, and producer

=== Television ===
Year	Title	Role	Notes
2009	Blimp Prom	Jenny	TV movie
2012	Ben and Kate	Darcy	2 episodes
2014	Inside Edition	Herself	Episode dated 27 February 2014
2016	Grey's Anatomy	Judy	Season 12, episode 10
2017	Master of None	Christine	Season 2, episode 4
2021	Santa Inc.	Mrs. Dijonnaise / Rivka Spinster / Teenage Girl Activist	Voice role Episode: "The Announcement"
