= Get What You Want =

2007 single by Operator Please

Single by Operator Please

from the album Yes Yes Vindictive and Cement Cement EP
- B-side: "Icicle"; "Zero, Zero"
- Released: 29 October 2007
- Length: 3:52
- Label: Virgin
- Songwriters: Amandah Wilkinson; Tim Commandeur; Sarah Gardiner; Ashley McConnell; Taylor Henderson
- Producer: Simon Barnicott

Operator Please singles chronology
"Just a Song About Ping Pong" (2007)	"Get What You Want" (2007)	"Leave It Alone" (2007)

"Get What You Want" is a song by Australian band Operator Please. The song was first recorded in 2006 and featured on the band's second Extended Play Cement Cement. The song was re-recorded and released in Australia on 29 October 2007 as the second single their debut album, Yes Yes Vindictive. The song peaked at number 27 on the ARIA Singles Chart.

"Get What You Want" was one of the 100 most-played songs on Australian radio network Triple J during the year of its release, and has also been used in television ad campaigns for Australian National Youth Week and airline Virgin Blue.

== Track listings ==
Australian CD single

1. "Get What You Want" (album version) – 3:53
2. "Icicle" – 2:47
3. "Get What You Want" (Wolf & Cub remix) – 6:02

Australian iTunes single

1. "Get What You Want" (Album version) – 3:54
2. "Zero, Zero" – 3:05

UK CD single

1. "Get What You Want" (album version) – 3:54
2. "Waiting by the Car" – 3:01
3. "Get What You Want" (UK music video) – 3:57

UK iTunes single

1. "Get What You Want" (Album version) – 3:54
2. "Get What You Want" (G.L.O.V.E.S. remix) – 3:54

== Charts ==
Chart (2007–2008)	Peak position
Australia (ARIA)	27
UK Indie (Official Charts)	1

== Release history ==
Region	Date	Ref.
Australia	29 October 2007	
United Kingdom	17 February 2008	
