= Chaingang =

Australian punk rock band

- Origin: Sydney, New South Wales, Australia
- Genre: Rock
- Years active: 2007–2011
- Label: Unsigned
- Past members: Hayley Foster; Mike Jeffery; Daniel Duque-Perez; Chris Riley
- Website: http://www.myspace.com/chaingangpower

Chaingang (sometimes listed as CHAINGANG) were an Australian rock band from Sydney.

== History ==
Chaingang formed in 2007 following the dissolution of Hayley Foster and Mike Jeffery's former band Pinky Tuscadero on New Year's Eve 2006. Cultivating a rapt cult following across Sydney, the band first came to widespread attention when they were personally chosen by US band Panic! at the Disco to support them during their 2008 Australian tour.

A demo version of one of their first tracks, Get Off My Stage, attracted widespread attention via tastemaking music blogs across the UK, US, and Australia, and saw the band selected by national youth broadcaster Triple J as an Unearthed Feature Artist in 2008.

Chaingang have since played with the likes of Cold War Kids, The Streets, Crystal Castles, Ladyhawke, The Grates, Bluejuice, Peaches' band Sweet Machine, Operator Please, and opened for George Michael at the official 2010 Sydney Mardi Gras party. The band were also finalists in MTV's Kickstart initiative.

Chaingang completed a national tour with Operator Please and Tim and Jean, and were set to play the Big Day Out festival in January 2011.

== Debut release ==
Chaingang recorded an EP in Nashville with producer Sean Ray aka Snob Scrilla, but the project was scrapped. A new EP is scheduled for release in 2011.

== Discography ==
Singles

- 2010: Holiday
- 2011: Crazy

Extended plays

- 2011: Chaingang (TBA)
