= Just a Song About Ping Pong =

2007 single by Operator Please

Single by Operator Please

from the album Yes Yes Vindictive
- B-side: "In Motion"; "Spying"
- Released: 28 July 2007
- Length: 2:17
- Label: Virgin
- Songwriter: Operator Please
- Producer: Magoo

Operator Please singles chronology
"Just a Song About Ping Pong" (2007)	"Get What You Want" (2007)

Alternative cover
- UK cover artwork

"Just a Song About Ping Pong" is a song by Australian rock band Operator Please. The song was first included on the band's debut extended play, On the Prowl, in 2006. The band later re-recorded the song after signing with Virgin Records and released this version in July 2007 as the lead single from their debut studio album, Yes Yes Vindictive. The song peaked at number 12 on the Australian ARIA Singles Chart. At the ARIA Music Awards of 2007, the song was nominated for three awards, winning Breakthrough Artist - Single.

== Track listings ==
Australian CD single

1. "Just a Song About Ping Pong"
2. "Just a Song About Ping Pong" (Kissy Sell Out White Stallion remix)
3. "In Motion"
4. "Spying"

UK 7-inch single

A. "Just a Song About Ping Pong"
B. "In Motion"

== Charts ==
=== Weekly charts ===
Chart (2007)	Peak position
Australia (ARIA)	12
UK Indie (OCC)	10

=== Year-end charts ===
Chart (2007)	Position
Australia (ARIA)	73
Australian Artists (ARIA)	18
