= Logic (song) =

2010 single by Operator Please

Single by Operator Please

from the album Gloves
- Released: 16 February 2010
- Genre: Indie rock
- Length: 3:33
- Label: EMI
- Songwriter(s): Amandah Wilkinson, James Eliot

Operator Please singles chronology
"Two for My Seconds" (2008)	"Logic" (2010)	"Back and Forth" (2010)

"Logic" is a song by Australian band Operator Please, released on 16 February 2010 as the lead single from the band's second album, Gloves. The song peaked at number 47 on the ARIA charts.

== Release ==
The song first appeared on the band's official MySpace page on 15 January 2010. Around the same time a download offer was added to the band's official website where you could sign up to a mailing list which would send you a free download link on 8 February. The song went on to be officially released on the iTunes Store eight days later, and was released on 7" vinyl on 12 March. It is notable that new member Chris Holland contributes backing vocals to "Logic".

== Music video ==
In early February, the band filmed the video for "Logic". The video premiered on 13 February on Video Hits. It is predominantly a performance-based video and features effects reminiscent of the artwork for the album.

== Track listings ==
AUS CD single

1. "Logic" – 3:32
2. "Logic" (Dolby Anol Remix) – 4:53

UK CD single

1. "Logic" – 3:32
2. "Back and Forth" (acoustic demo) – 3:31

AUS iTunes EP

1. "Logic" – 3:32
2. "Logic" (demo) – 3:29
3. "Logic" (Dolby Anol Remix) – 4:53
4. "Back and Forth" (acoustic demo) – 3:31

UK iTunes EP

1. "Logic" – 3:32
2. "Logic" (Semothy Jones Remix) – 4:31
3. "Logic" (Dolby Anol Remix) – 4:53

== Charts ==
The song debuted at number 73 on the Australian ARIA Singles Chart on 21 February 2010. On 18 April 2010, "Logic" peaked at number 47 and only spent one week inside the top 50.

Chart performance for "Logic"
Chart (2010)	Peak position
Australia (ARIA)	47
