= On the Prowl (EP) =

EP by Operator Please
- Released: 2006
- Recorded: 2006
- Venue: Gold Coast, Queensland
- Studio: Musical Solutions
- Genre: Rock
- Length: 17:02
- Label: Independent
- Producer: Roulf Commandeur

Operator Please chronology
On the Prowl (2006)	Cement Cement (2006)

On the Prowl is the debut extended play by the Australian rock band, Operator Please, self-released in 2006. It was recorded and produced by the band's drummer's father, Roulf Commandeur, at his home studio, Musical Solutions, in the Gold Coast, Queensland. It was limited to a release of about 300 handmade copies.

== Background ==
On the Prowl is Operator Please's debut recording with the line-up of Tim Commandeur on drums, Sarah-Jane Gardiner on keyboards, Taylor Henderson on violin, Ashley McConnell on bass guitar and Amandah Wilkinson on lead vocals. According to The Guardian's Leonie Cooper the group started with a do-it-yourself ethic, "the band members and their accompanying instruments crammed into Commandeur's father's tiny home recording studio, which was normally used for taping backing tracks for commercials. Six hours later their debut EP, On the Prowl, was completed." Commandeur recorded and produced the EP and "CDs were burned from the computer and Wilkinson's sister, a graphic design student, put together the artwork, which was printed on the new family inkjet printer." They sold the limited pressing of about 400 copies at their gigs and local record shops.

Jody Macgregor from AllMusic described the group's early effort "To help them secure more gigs they recorded the [EP] at a studio belonging to Commandeur's father, selling copies via MySpace and a post office box."

"Just a Song About Ping Pong" was later re-recorded and released as the lead single from their debut studio album Yes Yes Vindictive which was released in 2007.

== Track listing ==
1. "Just a Song About Ping Pong" (On the Prowl version) – 2:26
2. "Paperclips" – 2:39
3. "Catalogue Kids" – 3:24
4. "Teapot" – 2:46^
5. "Terminal Disease" – 2:08
6. "One Yellow Button" – 3:40

^ Internet bonus track.
