= Operator Please =

Australian pop band

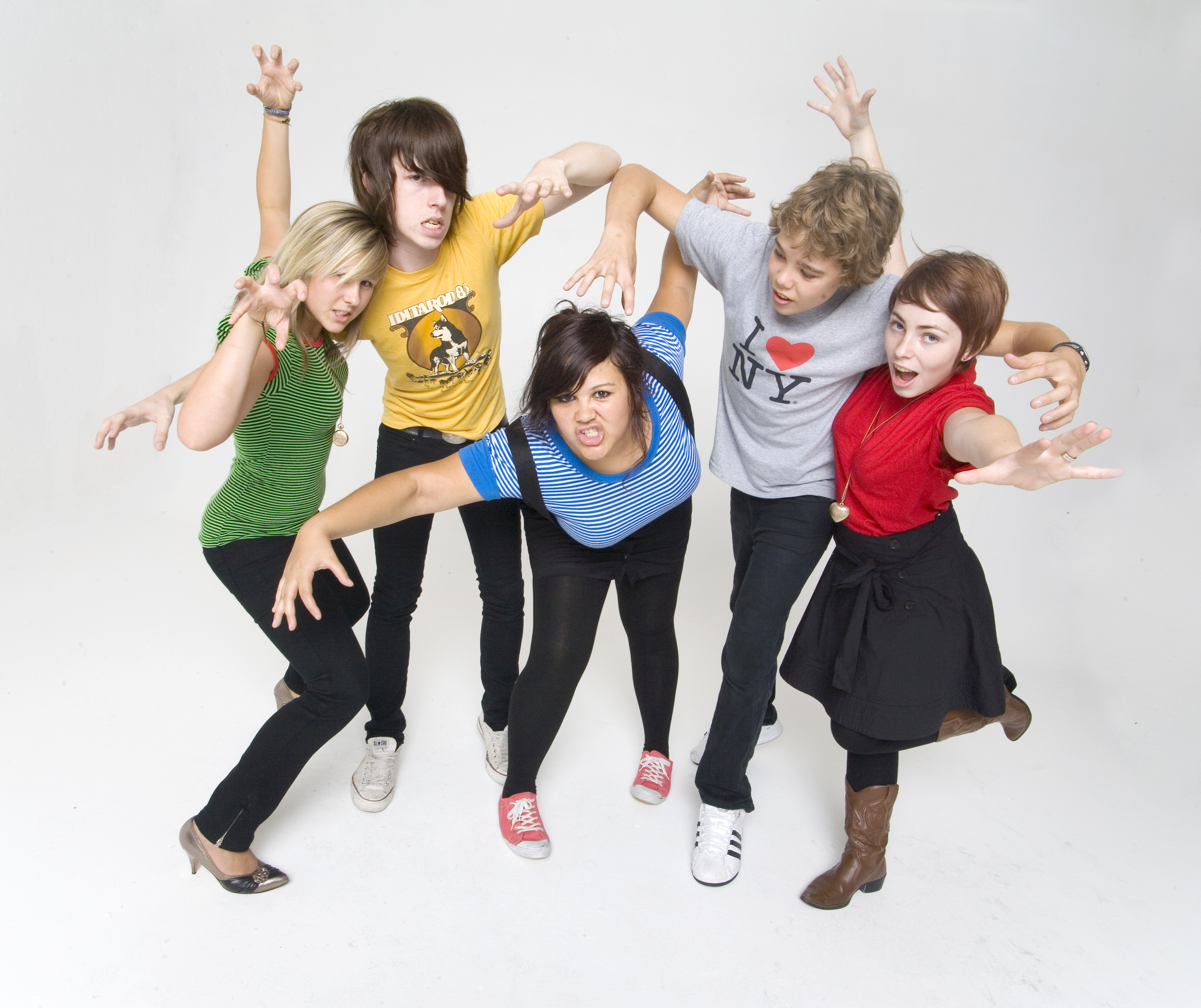
- Operator Please in 2008; Left to right: Taylor Henderson, Ashley McConnell, Amandah Wilkinson, Tim Commandeur and Sarah Gardiner

Background information
- Origin: Gold Coast, Queensland, Australia
- Genres: Indie rock, indie pop, pop rock, new wave, dance-punk, teen pop
- Years active: 2005–2026
- Labels: Virgin; EMI Music Australia
- Past members: Amandah Wilkinson; Taylor Henderson; Tim Commandeur; Chris Holland; Ashley McConnell; Sarah Gardiner; Stephanie Joske; Kieran Richards; Blake Ross

Operator Please were an Australian pop band, originating in the Gold Coast, Queensland, in 2005. Their final line-up consisted of vocalist and guitarist Amandah Wilkinson, drummer Tim Commandeur, keyboardist Chris Holland, bassist Ashley McConnell and violinist Taylor Henderson. They are best known for their 2007 single "Just a Song About Ping Pong", which won an ARIA Music Award at the 2007 ceremony.

== History ==
=== 2005–2011 ===
Operator Please formed in early 2005 by lead singer and guitarist Amandah Wilkinson and students of Elanora State High School in an attempt to compete in the high school's annual "Battle of the Bands" competition, which they went on to win.

After winning the contest, the five members, aged 17 to 19, recorded and self-released the EP On the Prowl in 2006, limited to 300 handmade copies. The EP included an early version of the song "Just a Song About Ping Pong". The band released a second EP, Cement Cement, in 2006, which generated interest both locally and internationally from a combination of word of mouth and exposure on the Australian youth radio network Triple J, and the band were signed to Virgin Records. The band opened for Arctic Monkeys and Kaiser Chiefs on their 2007 Australian tours.

In July 2007, the band released a re-recorded version of "Just a Song About Ping Pong" as their debut single. The song peaked at number 12 on the ARIA Charts and at the ARIA Music Awards of 2007; the song won the ARIA Award for Breakthrough Artist – Single. Celebrity blogger Perez Hilton labelled Operator Please as "our favourite new band" and "the next big thing".

In October 2007, the band released "Get What You Want", which peaked at number 27 on the ARIA Charts. This was followed by the band's debut studio album, Yes Yes Vindictive, in November 2007, which peaked at number 28 on the ARIA album chart.

In 2008, the band toured throughout Europe and Asia and released Yes Yes Vindictive in the UK on 17 March 2008.

Operator Please spent 2009 composing their second album. On 8 February 2010, the band released the album's lead single, "Logic". The band's second album, Gloves, was released on 23 April 2010 in Australia and 31 May 2010 in the rest of the world. The album peaked at number 20 on the ARIA album chart.

In June 2010, the band completed their first headlining tour since late 2008; they were supported by Perth band Tim & Jean and Sydney band Chaingang. Shortly afterwards, they would play a variety of festivals, including Splendour in the Grass and Canberra festival Stonefest. They also played the Australian leg of the 2011 Big Day Out festival. March and April 2011 saw the band tour Australia, this time as the main support for Sydney musician Sparkadia. "Catapult" was released in January 2011 as the fifth and final single from Gloves.

=== 2012–present ===
Although the band have not officially split, they have been inactive since 2011, and the band members are currently part of other projects. Wilkinson has adopted the moniker Bossy Love, collaborated with John Baillie Jnr of Dananananaykroyd, and released her debut EP Me + You in October 2013; Holland and Commandeur formed the duo Colour Coding and released their debut EP Proof in March 2012, later announcing a hiatus for that project in November 2013.

== Discography ==
=== Studio albums ===
List of studio albums, with selected chart positions and certifications
Title	Details	Peak chart positions	
Title	Details	AUS	UK
Yes Yes Vindictive	Released: November 2007; Label: Virgin (5137072); Format: CD	28	157
Gloves	Released: 23 April 2010; Label: Virgin, EMI Music (50999 6290472 8); Format: CD, DD	20	—

=== Extended plays ===
List of EPs, with selected details
Title	Details
On the Prowl	Released: 2006; Label: Operator Please; Format: CD
Cement Cement	Released: 2006; Label: Scorpio Management, Virgin (3864422); Format: CD, DD

=== Singles ===
List of singles, with selected chart positions
Title	Year	Peak chart positions		Album
Title	Year	AUS	UK	Album
"Just a Song About Ping Pong"	2007	12	10	Yes Yes Vindictive
"Get What You Want"	2007	27	121	Yes Yes Vindictive
"Leave It Alone"	2007	62	133	Yes Yes Vindictive
"Two for My Seconds"	2008	93	—	Yes Yes Vindictive
"Logic"	2010	47	—	Gloves
"Back and Forth"	2010	84	—	Gloves
"Like Magic"	2010	—	—	Gloves
"Volcanic"	2010	—	—	Gloves
"Catapult"	2011	—	—	Gloves

== Awards and nominations ==
=== ARIA Awards ===
The ARIA Music Awards is an annual awards ceremony that recognises excellence, innovation, and achievement across all genres of Australian music.

Year	Award	Work	Result	Ref.
2007	Breakthrough Artist – Single	"Just a Song About Ping Pong"	Won	
2007	Best Pop Release	"Just a Song About Ping Pong"	Nominated	
2007	Engineer of the Year	Magoo for "Just a Song About Ping Pong"	Nominated	
2008	Breakthrough Artist – Album	Yes Yes Vindictive	Nominated	
2008	Best Pop Release	Yes Yes Vindictive	Nominated	
