= Back and Forth (Operator Please song) =

Single by Operator Please

from the album Gloves
- Released: 16 April 2010
- Recorded: 2009
- Genre: Indie rock, dance-pop
- Length: 3:09
- Label: EMI
- Songwriter(s): Amandah Wilkinson, Matt Gooderson, D. Watts

Operator Please singles chronology
"Logic" (2010)	"Back and Forth" (2010)	"Like Magic" (2010)

"Back and Forth" is a song by the Australian band Operator Please, released in April 2010 as the second single from the band's second album, Gloves. The song peaked at number 84 on the ARIA Chart.

The song is used on the soundtrack of the 2012 comedy, For a Good Time, Call....

== Music video ==
The video shows the band members playing their instruments on a stage on a blue-curtained set, surrounded by six female dancers who perform simple dance moves behind them. It was directed by Elvira Wilkinson and released on Operator Please's official YouTube channel on 22 April 2010.

== Charts ==
"Back and Forth" debuted on the Australian ARIA Singles Chart at number 96 in the same week, beginning 3 May 2010, that Gloves debuted on the albums chart. The following week, it reached its peak of number 84, and spent two more weeks in the top 100 before dropping out of the chart.

Chart (2010)	Peak position
Australia (ARIA)	84
