= Two for My Seconds =

2008 single by Operator Please

Single by Operator Please

from the album Yes Yes Vindictive
- B-side: "Catalogue Kids"; "Ouch Burn"
- Released: 21 June 2008
- Length: 4:00 (album version)
- Label: Brille
- Songwriter: Amandah Wilkinson
- Producer: Simon Barnicott

Operator Please singles chronology
"Leave It Alone" (2007)	"Two for My Seconds" (2008)	"Logic" (2010)

"Two for My Seconds" is a song by Australian band Operator Please, originally recorded for the band's second extended play, Cement Cement (2006), the song was re-recorded in 2007 and released as the fourth and final single from their debut album, Yes Yes Vindictive.

== Music video ==
The music video for "Two for My Seconds" was filmed in The Rocks area of Sydney, Australia during early April. Behind-the-scenes photos were released on the band's MySpace page and behind-the-scenes videos were released on YouTube. The video premiered on YouTube and was released for download on the Australian iTunes Store on 21 June 2008.

The video begins with the lead singer Wilkinson singing in front of the camera, while the pianist Sarah Gardiner plays the piano beside her on the street, with the Sydney Harbour Bridge as the backdrop. Wilkinson is then seen singing at nighttime with their drummer, also on the same street. The video also features shots of all the band members playing their instruments on the stairway at night.

== Track listing ==
- Australian digital download
1. "Two for My Seconds" – 4:02
2. "Catalogue Kids" – 3:20
3. "Ouch Burn" – 3:13

== Charts ==
"Two for My Seconds" debuted at number 93 on the Australian ARIA Singles Chart on 7 July, based on downloads alone.

Chart (2008)	Peak position
Australia (ARIA)	93
