= Tim Commandeur =

Australian musician (born 1990)

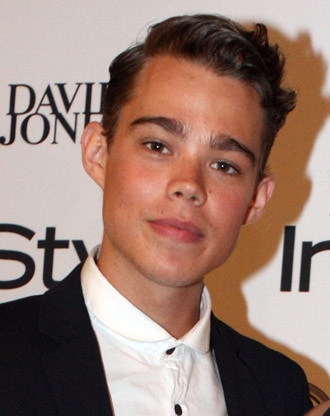
- Commandeur in 2013

Background information
- Born: Timothy Commandeur; June 22, 1990 (age 36); Queensland, Australia
- Genres: Indie rock; indie pop; pop rock; electronic
- Occupations: Musician; producer
- Instrument: Drums
- Years active: 2005-present
- Website: www.timcommandeur.com/

Timothy Commandeur (born 22 June 1990) is an ARIA Award–winning Sydney-based drummer and producer, best known as the touring drummer for Royel Otis and previously of Operator Please and Panama.

== Biography ==
Drumming since the age of ten, Commandeur joined Amandah Wilkinson and the band Operator Please in 2005 at age 15. The band performed together for six years and toured the world. They performed on major stages such as Glastonbury to Splendour In The Grass. Operator Please won an ARIA Award at the ARIA Music Awards of 2007. In 2011, Commandeur joined cousin and former Operator Please member Chris Holland to form the band Colour Coding. They released an EP called Proof and the duo created remixes for artists Amy Meredith and Alpine. In 2013, Commandeur made his first foray into a solo career, releasing an EP called Cabin Fever as Alaskan Knight. In 2014, Commandeur joined the band Panama and embarked on tours around the world including playing at SXSW in 2014 and Primavera Festival in 2015. Commandeur has been writing music since 2015 under the moniker "Commandeur" and signed with Risqué Music in 2020. Commandeur's work has attracted feature vocals from KLP, Ollie Gabriel, Genes and Yeo along with the likes of Set Mo requesting a remix. When discussing Commandeur's collaboration with Ollie Gabriel on the song "Me and You", Dave Ruby Howe from Triple J stated: "Tim's a skilled drummer and equally talented producer". Commandeur also records and performs as Channings, a solo live/electronic project drawing on 1990s big-beat and rave influences such as Underworld and The Chemical Brothers. Channings has released the singles "Every Minute" (2024), "Why You Leaving?" (2024), and "What Can I Say?" (2024), followed by the EP The House of Channings (2025).

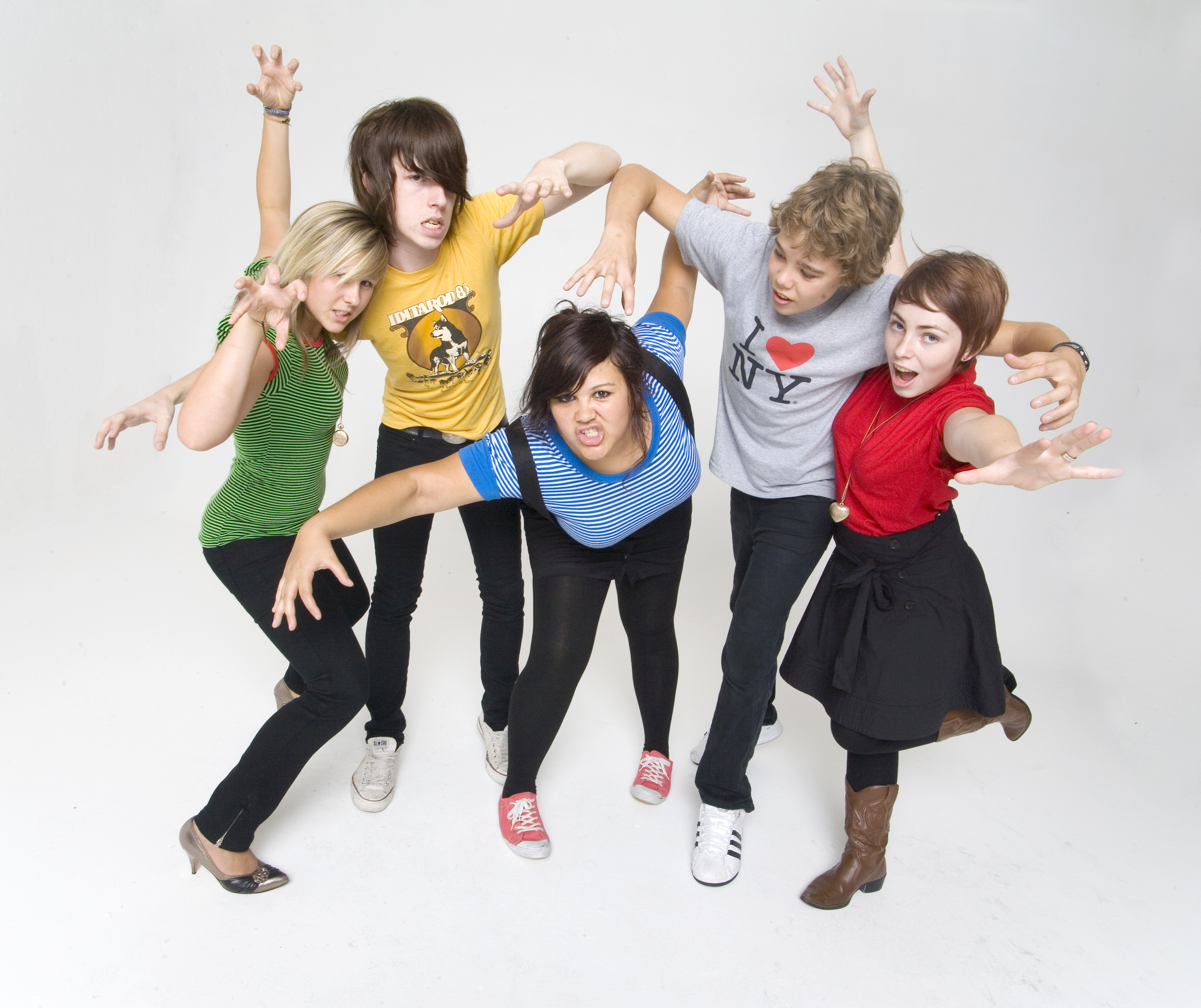
Commandeur with Operator Please in 2007.

Commandeur has drummed as part of the stage band for PNAU, Alice Ivy and Tkay Maidza and international acts that tour Australia such as Dua Lipa and King Princess, as well as Genesis Owusu, Crooked Colours, The Veronicas, Slumberjack, Hot Dub Time Machine, Kita Alexander, and Fergus James. Since Royel Otis's rise to international prominence, Commandeur has served as the band's touring drummer, performing with them across multiple world tours. In 2026, Royel Otis were announced as a support act on Foo Fighters' 2026 European stadium tour, including a date at Anfield in Liverpool. Beyond performing, Commandeur has composed music for brand campaigns including Quiksilver, Roxy, F45, and Dior, and has scored large-scale installations such as Vivid Sydney and Uluru's "Sunrise Journeys". He is endorsed by Ludwig Drums, Zildjian, Remo, and Vic Firth.

== Personal life ==
Commandeur dated model and actress April Rose Pengilly, daughter of INXS musician Kirk Pengilly, from 2011 to 2014. Commandeur has been dating Laura Lee Scott since 2014 and were due to be married in October 2020 but had to postpone due to the pandemic. They eventually married in 2022 at Sydney’s Strickland House. The wedding was featured in Vogue Australia. Operator Please recorded their first EP in Commandeur's father Roulf's professional recording studio on the Gold Coast. When Roulf died in 2016, Commandeur inherited his father's recording gear, including Genelec speakers. Commandeur's first drum kit was a 1960s Premier Jazz kit that his father bought from the local Avon representative for $400 after her husband passed away. In 2017, a fire broke out in a studio in Marrickville, which saw Commandeur losing recording equipment to fire damage.

== Discography ==
=== Extended Plays ===
List of EPs, with selected details
| Title | Details |
|---|---|
| Cabin Fever (as Alaskan Knight) | Released: 22 June 2013; Label: Alaskan Knight; Format: DD |
| The House of Channings (as Channings) | Released: 2025; Format: Digital download / streaming |

=== Singles ===
As Commandeur

| Title | Year |
|---|---|
| "With Me" | 2015 |
| "Speak Your Mind" (feat. Yeo) | 2016 |
| "Feel the Love" | 2020 |
| "Feel the Love" (Commandeur Remix) | 2020 |
| "Nothing Else" | 2020 |
| "Me and You" | 2020 |
| "Numb" | 2020 |
| "already gone (walls are bending)" | 2021 |

As Channings

| Title | Year |
|---|---|
| "Every Minute" | 2024 |
| "Every Minute" (Big Beat Version) | 2024 |
| "Why You Leaving?" | 2024 |
| "What Can I Say?" | 2024 |

== See also ==
- Colour Coding
- Operator Please
- Panama
- Royel Otis
