= Chain Gang (band) =

American punk rock band

Chain Gang was an American punk rock band known foremost for the 1977 single "Son of Sam" (Gee, Luanda) which had limited success on the British charts and was subsequently covered by the Jon Spencer Blues Explosion. The group consisted of Larry Gee on guitar, Phil Von Rome on drums. Ted Twist on bass and the late Ricky Luanda (Rick McGregor) on Vocals. in 1987 the group did the soundtrack for the film "Mondo Manhattan". In 1991, Chain Gang recorded the single "Kill for You" and in 1993 the LP "Perfumed" on Matador Records.
