= Gloves (album) =

Studio album by Operator Please
- Released: 26 April 2010
- Recorded: May–August 2009
- Studios: Music Farm Studio, Coorabell, NSW; Amandah Wilkinson's living room, Elanora, Queensland
- Genres: Dance-pop; indie pop
- Length: 33:41
- Labels: Virgin/EMI; Scorpio Music
- Producers: Justin Tresidder; Amandah Wilkinson

Operator Please chronology
Yes Yes Vindictive (2007)	Gloves (2010)

Singles from Gloves
- 1. "Logic" Released: 16 February 2010; 2. "Back and Forth" Released: 24 May 2010; 3. "Like Magic" Released: 30 July 2010; 4. "Volcanic" Released: 1 October 2010; 5. "Catapult" Released: 21 January 2011

Gloves is the second and final studio album from Australian indie rock/pop rock band Operator Please. It was released on 26 April 2010 in Australia and on 31 May 2010 in the UK under Virgin/EMI. Gloves debuted at number 20 on the Australian ARIA Albums Chart on 3 May 2010.

== Singles ==
The lead single "Logic" was released on 16 February 2010.

The video for the second single "Back and Forth" was released on 22 April 2010 and released on 24 May 2010.

"Like Magic" was released as the third single on 30 July 2010, followed by "Volcano" on 1 October 2010 and "Catapult" in January 2011.

== Track listing ==
Gloves track listing
No.	Title	Writer(s)	Length
1.	"Catapult"	Amandah Wilkinson; Timothy Commandeur; Semothy Jones	3:12
2.	"Just Kiss"	Wilkinson; Isaac Emmanuel	3:22
3.	"Logic"	Wilkinson; James Eliot	3:33
4.	"Oh My"	Wilkinson; Commandeur	3:36
5.	"Back and Forth"	Wilkinson; Matt Gooderson	3:09
6.	"Volcanic"	Wilkinson; Jones	3:22
7.	"Loops"	Wilkinson; Commandeur; Jones	3:34
8.	"Jealous"	Wilkinson; Commandeur	3:38
9.	"Losing Patience"	Wilkinson; Ben Lee	3:06
10.	"Like Magic"	Wilkinson; Commandeur	3:13
Total length:			33:41

== Charts ==
Chart performance for Gloves
Chart (2010)	Peak position
Australian Albums (ARIA)	20
