= Chain gang (cycling) =

Group of cyclists in a close formation

A chain gang or pace line

In the sport of road cycling, a chain gang is a group of cyclists in a close knit formation usually of two parallel lines drafting behind the leader.

The formation comes from the fact that it is harder to cycle at the front of a group than in the shelter of another rider. The rider behind enjoys the slipstream of the rider in front. If one rider were to stay at the front all the time, they would tire and the whole group would slow down. If the lead is rotated, the effort is distributed across the group and the speed can be higher or the individual effort less.

This effect is very significant - up to a 40% reduction in effort for the slip-streaming riders while the lead rider also benefits from reduced drag (somewhat under 10%) due to the air not closing up after them.

The name chain gang is an allusion to the formation that riders adopt. The rider in the front of the group will take their share of the lead, then swing to the side and let the rest of the line come through, led by a new leader. The first rider then eases up and drops in behind the last rider in the line, staying in their slipstream until once again their turn comes to ride at the front.

When there are enough riders, turns at the front can be so brief that there is a continuous flow up and down, in two lines, so that cyclists take on the role of links in a chain. For that reason: chain gang.

The technique is hard to perfect because it demands riders cycle close to the rider in front at speed, sometimes just centimetres from their tyre. It also demands trust in others in the group because, that close, no rider would be able to avoid hitting the one in front if the pace suddenly slowed. For that reason, the leading rider takes responsibility for taking the line through the smoothest path they can and at a constant speed. They should also indicate with hand gestures the upcoming bumps or obstacles on the road by pointing their finger in the corresponding direction the hazard is coming, in a manner that can be seen by the following rider, who is likely staring at their rear wheel. (Pointing their finger down on the left if they are about to closely pass by a pothole on this side, etc.) The following rider can then relay the information to the next and so on, creating a "chain of information" so the whole group is safe.

The technique is often used in training for races but it can be seen in races themselves, usually when a small group of riders gets ahead of the main field, or in team time-trials, where the chain-gang technique is paramount.

Chain gangs can also be referred to in the US as pace lines and in the UK as bit-and-bit, although this term is not in common use within the British cycling community.

== See also ==
- Peloton
