= Yes Yes Vindictive =

Studio album by Operator Please
- Released: (Australia) 10 November 2007 (Germany) 14 March 2008 (Japan) 15 March 2008 (United Kingdom) 17 March 2008
- Recorded: 2006–2007
- Genre: Indie rock, pop rock, dance-punk
- Length: 39:41
- Label: Virgin Records
- Producer: Simon Barnicott

Operator Please chronology
Cement Cement (2006)	Yes Yes Vindictive (2007)	Gloves (2010)

Singles from Yes Yes Vindictive
- 1. "Just a Song About Ping Pong" Released: 28 July 2007; 2. "Get What You Want" Released: 27 October 2007; 3. "Leave It Alone" Released: 19 November 2007; 4. "Two for My Seconds" Released: 21 June 2008

Professional ratings
Review scores
Source	Rating
Artrocker	4/5 stars
The Fly	(4/5)
MusicOMH	3.5/5 stars
NME	3/5 stars
Rockfeedback	4/5 stars
Time Off	3.5/5 stars

Yes Yes Vindictive is the debut studio album from Australian indie rock/pop-punk band, Operator Please. It was released on 10 November 2007, and on 17 March 2008 in the UK under Virgin/EMI. The album features the singles "Just a Song About Ping Pong", "Get What You Want", "Leave It Alone" and "Two for My Seconds". The album was recorded in the Grove Studios on the New South Wales Central Coast with UK producer Simon Barnicott. It debuted and peaked at No. 28 on the Australian ARIA Albums Chart.

At the ARIA Music Awards of 2008, the album was nominated for two awards; Breakthrough Artist – Album and Best Pop Release.

== Promotion and touring ==
The album was released after the band had played some of the UK's biggest music festivals, including Leeds and Reading, which followed and Australian and New Zealand tours. Ashley McConnell said Operator Please were introduced to distortion pedals and synths during the making of the album.

== Singles ==
The lead single from the album was "Just a Song About Ping Pong", which was released in Australia on 28 July 2007. It debuted at number 15 on the Australian ARIA Singles Chart, before reaching its peak of 12. The song won the ARIA Award for Breakthrough Artist – Single at the ARIA Music Awards of 2007.

"Get What You Want" was released on 27 October 2007 as the second single. The song peaked at number 27 in Australia.

"Leave It Alone" was released as the third single on 19 November 2007 in the UK and on 25 February 2008 in Australia. The song peaked at number 62 in Australia.

"Two for My Seconds", was released on 21 June 2008 as the fourth and final single. It debuted at No. 93 on the ARIA Singles Chart on 7 July based on downloads alone.

== Track listing ==
=== Australian edition ===
1. "Zero! Zero!" – 3:06
2. "Get What You Want" – 3:49
3. "Leave It Alone" – 3:38
4. "Cringe" – 3:22
5. "Just a Song About Ping Pong" – 2:18
6. "Two for My Seconds" – 4:00
7. "6/8" – 3:30
8. "Yes Yes" – 2:54
9. "Other Song" – 3:19
10. "Terminal Disease" – 1:56
11. "Ghost" – 3:21
12. "Pantomime" – 4:28
13. "Rockinghorse" (Australian physical album download bonus track) – 3:44
14. "One Yellow Button" (iTunes bonus track)

=== Japanese edition ===
1. "Zero Zero"
2. "Get What You Want"
3. "ピンポン!" (Pinpon; "Just a Song About Ping Pong")
4. "Cringe"
5. "Two for My Seconds"
6. "Terminal Disease"
7. "6/8"
8. "Yes Yes Vindictive"
9. "Other Song"
10. "Ghost"
11. "Leave It Alone"
12. "Pantomime"
13. "Crash Tragic"
14. "Icicle"
15. "One Yellow Button"
16. "In Motion"
17. "Leave It Alone" (New Young Pony Club Remix)
18. "Leave It Alone" (David E. Sugar Mix)
19. "ピンポン!" (Pinpon; "Just a Song About Ping Pong" Kissy Sell Out's White Stallion Radio Edit)
20. "ピンポン!" (Pinpon; "Just a Song About Ping Pong" music video)

== Charts ==
Chart (2007)	Peak position
Australian Albums (ARIA)	28
