= Tim & Jean =

Australian indie pop duo

- Origin: Mandurah, Western Australia, Australia
- Genres: Indie pop, synthpop
- Years active: 2008–2012
- Label: Mercury Records
- Past members: Tim Ayre; Jean Capotorto

Tim & Jean were an Australian indie pop duo from Mandurah, Western Australia. The group consisted of Tim Ayre and Jean Capotorto. The duo were known for their energetic live performances on stages such as Splendour in the Grass, Good Vibrations Festival, Future Music Festival, Falls Festival and many others. In 2011 the duo were nominated for and won two WAMi Awards, in the categories for Best Newcomer and Best Commercial Pop Act.

== History ==
The band began by recording demo tapes in Capotorto's bedroom studio in Mandurah. After posting their music on MySpace the band entered Triple J's Unearthed High School competition for unsigned bands, in which they made the finals with their track "Come Around" They were later selected by Triple J to play at Parklife Festival. Prior to collaborating, both Tim and Jean had been known for performing in other musical projects. Coming from a musical background, at the age of 12 Tim was asked to play with James Morrison, a renowned jazz trumpeter and musician. Tim was also the lead singer and keys player for Mandurah band, You, Me and Ryan, with whom he toured Western Australia for two years. Jean was known for playing guitar in various rock bands around Mandurah from a young age. Tim has played with many church bands in his time as a musician. The duo have played internationally in America and have supported Moby. Tim & Jean have been compared to U.S retro-pop outfit Passion Pit due to their similar style of music.

Tim and Jean released their debut album, Like What, in April 2011, which debuted and peaked at number 12 on the ARIA Album Charts.

In November 2012, Tim Ayre announced that the band had been renamed The Lazy Calm and that Jean Capotorto decided to leave the group immediately.

== Discography ==
=== Albums ===
Title	Details	Peak chart positions
Title	Details	AUS
Like What	Released: 1 April 2011; Label: Mercury Records (2762925); Format: CD, digital download	12

=== Singles ===
Title	Year	Album
"Come Around"	2009	Like What
"I Can Show You"	2010	Like What
"Don't Stop"	2010	Like What

== Awards ==
=== West Australian Music Industry Awards ===
The West Australian Music Industry Awards (WAMIs) are annual awards presented to the local contemporary music industry, put on annually by the Western Australian Music Industry Association Inc (WAM).

Year	Nominee / work	Award	Result (wins only)
2011	Tim & Jean	Best Electronic Music Act	Won
2011	Tim & Jean	Best Commercial Pop	Won
