= Wolfgang Gartner discography =

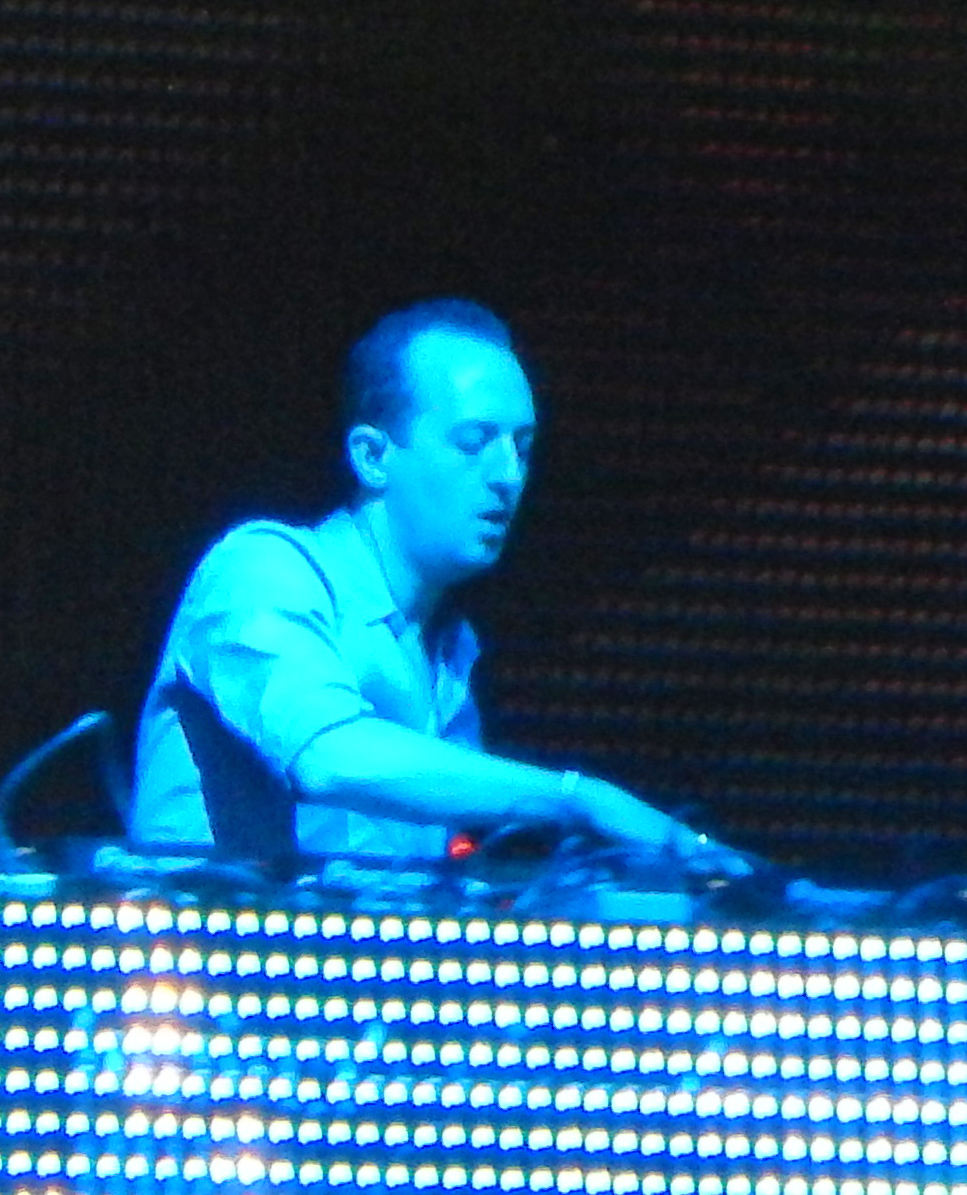
- Youngman at Spring Awakening, 2013
- Studio albums: 2
- Compilation albums: 1
- Singles: 34
- EPs: 12
- Remixes: 17

This is the discography of electronic dance music producer and DJ Wolfgang Gartner.

== Albums ==
=== Studio albums ===
Title	Album details	Charts	
Title	Album details	US Dance	US Heat
Weekend in America	Released: September 20, 2011; Label: Ultra, Sony Music, RED; Formats: Digital download, CD	10	17
10 Ways to Steal Home Plate	Released: January 29, 2016; Label: Kindergarten Records; Formats: Digital download, CD	16	—
"—" denotes a recording that did not chart or was not released in that territory.

=== Compilation albums ===
- Back Story (2012)

== Extended plays ==
- Shapes (2007)
- Hot For Teacher (2008)
- Candy (2008)
- Casual Encounters of the 3rd Kind (2012)
- More Ways (2016)
- Medicine (2018)
- Tucson (2020)

== Singles ==
2008

- "Killer" / "Flam Mode"
- "Montezuma" / "Frenetica"
- "Bounce" / "Get It"
- "Emergency"
- "Hook Shot" (b/w "Clap")
- "Flashback"

2009

- "Yin" / "Yang" (with Francis Preve)
- "Push & Rise"
- "Wolfgang's 5th Symphony" / "The Grey Agenda"
- "Fire Power" / "Latin Fever"

2010

- "Undertaker"
- "Conscindo" (with Mark Knight)
- "Animal Rights" (with Deadmau5) — UK #70
- "Illmerica" — UK #158
- "Space Junk"

2011

- "Forever" (featuring will.i.am) — UK #43
- "Ménage à Trois"
- "The Devil's Den" (with Skrillex)

2012

- "Go Home" (with will.i.am and Mick Jagger)
- "There and Back"
- "We Own the Night" (with Tiësto featuring Luciana) — UK #87
- "Redline"
- "Flexx"
- "Love & War" (b/w "Nuke")
- "Channel 42" (with deadmau5)
- "Evil Lurks" (with Tom Staar)

2013

- "Anaconda"
- "Overdose" (featuring Medina)
- "Hounds of Hell" (with Tommy Trash)
- "Piranha"

2014

- "We Are the Computers" (with Popeska)
- "Unholy" (featuring Bobby Saint)

2015

- "Turn Up" (featuring Wiley & Trina)

2016

- "Speed of Sound"
- "Baby Be Real" (featuring John Oates)
- "Devotion"

2017

- "Badboy Sound"
- "Borneo" (with Aero Chord)
- "Find A Way" (featuring Snow Tha Product)
- "Dubplate 99"

2018

- "Banshee" (with K?D)
- "Ching Ching"
- "The Upside Down" (with Jaykode)
- "Freak"
- "Deja Vu"

2019

- "Ectoplasm"
- "28 Grams"

2020

- "Electric Soul"
- "Battlestations" (with Kill The Noise)

2021

- "Channel 43" (with Deadmau5)
- "Cosa Nostra"
- "Octopus Teeth"
- "The Original"
- "Mike Tyson"

2022

- "How Ya Like Me Now" (with Kill The Noise featuring Ericka Guitron)
- "Higher"
- "Believe" (featuring NEVRMIND)

2023

- Level Up (featuring Scrufizzer)

2024

- "Dubplate 99 (VIP)"
- "Automatic"

== Remixes ==
2008

- Cold Act Ill (Wolfgang Gartner's Monster Mix / Club Mix) – Classixx
- Helium (Wolfgang Gartner Remix) – Bass Kleph & Anthony Paul
- Funk Nasty (Wolfgang Gartner Remix) – Andy Caldwell
- Cruel World (Wolfgang Gartner Kindergarten Slam Mix) – Ron Reeser & Dan Saenz
- Me & Myself (Wolfgang Gartner Remix) – Ben DJ feat. Sushy
- Play (Wolfgang Gartner Remix / Dub) – Jin Sonic & Dive

2009

- Heartbreaker (Wolfgang Gartner Remix) – MSTRKRFT feat. John Legend
- I Will Be Here (Wolfgang Gartner Remix) – Tiësto & Sneaky Sound System
- Cruelty (Wolfgang Gartner Remix) – Alaric
- 3 (Wolfgang Gartner Remix) – Britney Spears
- Morning After Dark (Wolfgang Gartner Remix) – Timbaland feat. Nelly Furtado & SoShy
- Imma Be (Wolfgang Gartner Club Mix) – The Black Eyed Peas

2010

- Blame It on the Girls (Wolfgang Gartner Remix / Dub) – Mika

2012

- Paddling Out (Wolfgang Gartner Remix) – Miike Snow
- Sorry For Party Rocking (Wolfgang Gartner Remix) – LMFAO
- Now or Never (Wolfgang Gartner Edit) – Popeska

2015

- I Had This Thing (Wolfgang Gartner Remix) – Röyksopp

2023

- REWiND (Wolfgang Gartner Remix) – Knock2
