= Kaleidoscope: Remixed =

Remix album by Tiësto
- Released: 31 August 2010
- Genre: Trance; progressive trance; electro house; progressive house
- Label: Musical Freedom
- Producer: Tiësto

Tiësto chronology
Magikal Journey (2010)	Kaleidoscope: Remixed (2010)	Club Life, Vol. 1 - Las Vegas (2011)

Kaleidoscope: Remixed is a remix album by Dutch electronic dance music artist Tiësto, released on 31 August 2010 in the United States. It is the remix album of Tiësto's fourth studio album, Kaleidoscope, released in 2009.

== Track listing ==
No.	Title	Length
1.	"I Will Be Here (Tiësto Remix)" (featuring Sneaky Sound System)	7:12
2.	"It's Not the Things You Say (Ali Wilson Tekelec Remix)" (featuring Kele Okereke)	7:49
3.	"Who Wants to Be Alone (Phillip D Remix)" (featuring Nelly Furtado)	9:33
4.	"Louder Than Boom (Bart B More Remix)"	7:08
5.	"Escape Me (Avicii's Remix At Night)" (featuring C.C. Sheffield)	7:40
6.	"Knock You Out (Mysto & Pizzi Remix)" (featuring Emily Haines)	7:55
7.	"Feel It in My Bones (First State Remix)" (featuring Tegan and Sara)	8:40
8.	"Kaleidoscope (Ferry Corsten Remix)" (featuring Jónsi)	8:46
9.	"Here on Earth (Nic Chagall Remix)" (featuring Cary Brothers)	9:33
10.	"Surrounded by Light (Tiësto Remix)"	8:52
11.	"Always Near (Extended Tiësto Beat Mix)"	7:58
12.	"I Am Strong (Jonas Stenberg Remix)" (featuring Priscilla Ahn)	7:27
13.	"I Will Be Here (Wolfgang Gartner Remix)" (featuring Sneaky Sound System)	8:14
14.	"Century (Sultan & Ned Shepard Remix)" (featuring Calvin Harris)	8:42

U.S. Deluxe Edition bonus tracks
No.	Title	Length
15.	"It's Not the Things You Say (Tiësto Remix)" (featuring Kele Okereke)	10:12
16.	"It's Not the Things You Say (Filthy Dukes Remix)" (featuring Kele Okereke)	7:59
17.	"Century (TV Rock Remix)" (featuring Calvin Harris)	7:11
18.	"Century (Tiësto Remix)" (featuring Calvin Harris)	8:09
19.	"Here on Earth (Alex Kunnari Remix)" (featuring Cary Brothers)	8:38

== Charts ==
Chart (2010)	Peak position
Australian Albums (ARIA)	110
Belgian Albums Chart (Flanders)	38
Belgian Albums Chart (Wallonia)	11
Danish Albums Chart	37
Dutch Albums Chart	37
Russian Albums Chart	7

== Release history ==
Region	Date	Label	Format
United States	31 August 2010	Ultra Records	CD, digital download
Worldwide	6 September 2010	Musical Freedom	CD, digital download
