= List of songs in DJ Hero 2 =

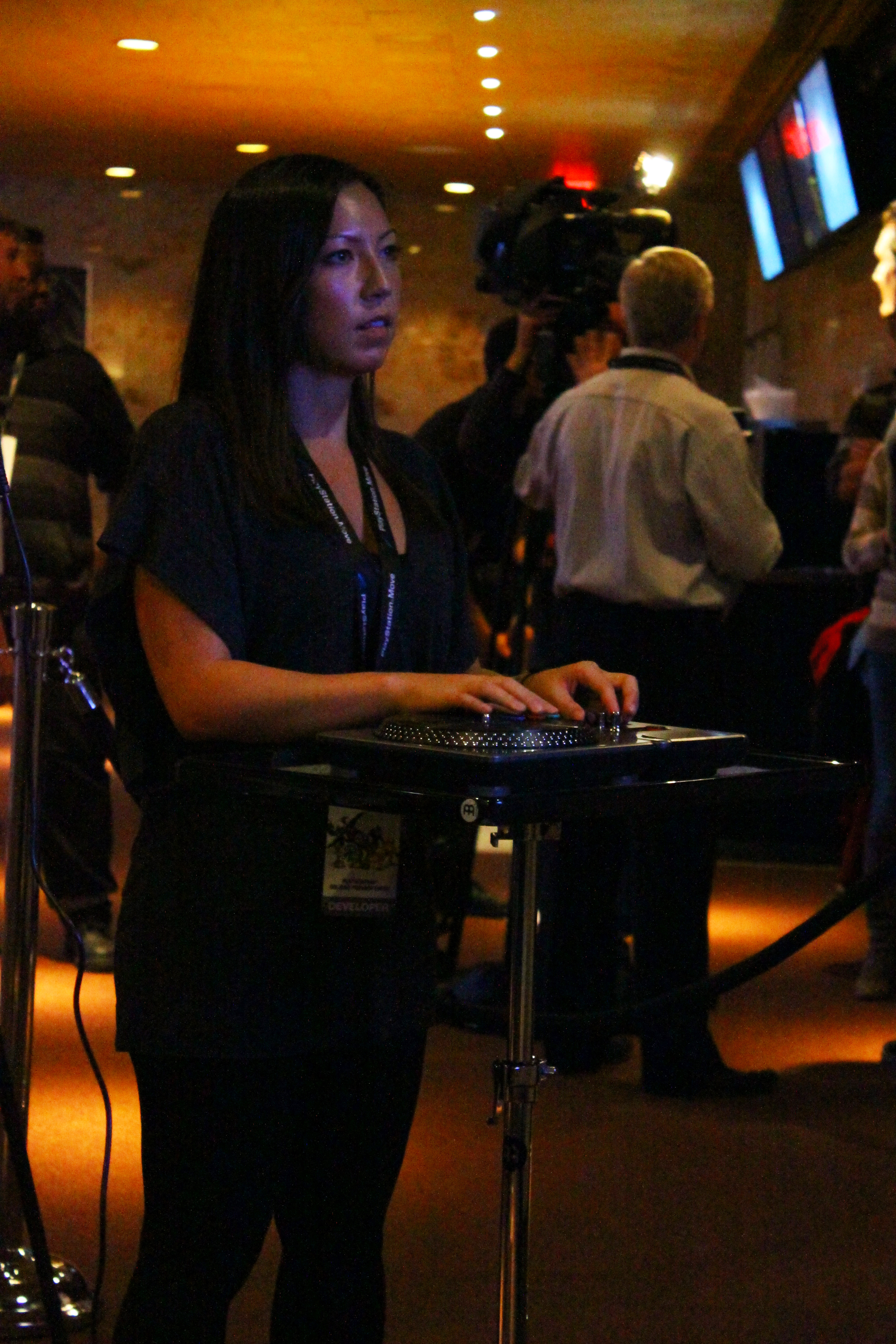
DJ Hero 2 features gameplay based on turntablism, using a special turntable-style controller (being used by a player above) to mimic scratching, crossfading, and freestyle effects.

DJ Hero 2 is the sequel to DJ Hero, a spinoff of the Guitar Hero series. DJ Hero 2 was developed by FreeStyleGames, published by Activision and released worldwide in October 2010 for the Xbox 360, PlayStation 3, and Wii consoles. Like its predecessor, DJ Hero 2 simulates turntablism, the playing of two songs in mix, using a special turntable-based controller that includes the ability to crossfade between the two songs, and scratching the recording. Players are challenged to match these actions, shown through on-screen scrolling indicators in synchronization with the mix; correct actions boost the player's score, while correctly performing several consecutive actions can increase the player's scoring multiplier. Specifically marked sections of songs allow the player to freestyle through crossfading, scratching, or inserting music samples into the mix. The player is not penalized for failing to perform actions. The goal is to obtain a high score for each mix, earning the player a star rating from one to five, which helps to advance the player's progress through the game.

DJ Hero 2 on-disc setlist includes 83 mixes from over 100 different songs spanning 85 artists. Several mixes have been composed by professional DJs, including David Guetta, Deadmau5, DJ Qbert, Tiësto and RZA, who also appear as in-game avatars. The success of the first game eased the acquisition of music licenses for the sequel, and allowed the inclusion of more popular music. However, licensing for such music remained a difficult barrier. Reviews found the setlist to provide better variety from the first game's heavier hip-hop influences. The game also supports downloadable content, both existing downloadable mixes from DJ Hero and new mixes since the sequel's release.

== Setlist ==
The following table lists the mixes and their constituent songs that are available on the DJ Hero 2 disc. Most mixes involve two different songs, but others are beat juggles using the same core song on two different tracks for unique effects. Within the game's career mode, songs are arranged in six venues, and further into three or four song setlists, often featuring songs all mixed by the same DJ artist. In certain sets that feature a real-life artist, the player will perform as that artist's avatar within the game. The player must earn a certain number of stars from previous venues and setlists to unlock later ones. Other mixes are specifically designed as Battle Mixes to be played in the game's two-player DJ Battles mode. All mixes are available to play in the game's Quickplay mode.

Reviewers found the soundtrack provided a wider range of genres, moving away from hip-hop and into house and dance genres, to appeal to more players. Matt Helgeson of Game Informer considered that the mixes were "uniformly great", and balanced popular artists with skilled DJ mixers. Eurogamer's Keza MacDonald stated the soundtrack was "faultless" and that while featuring a large number of songs from the club scene, the soundtrack is "still a powerful draw if you don't know or even like the music". Official Xbox Magazine UK's Mike Channell believed the "mashups also feel even more playful this time around", creating new interpretations of the lyrics of songs through the mixing. Cian Hassett of PALGN called the setlist "the most incredible fusion of contrasting genres known to man". Some critics commented that they felt the first game's track list was better; Damien Hatfield of IGN felt there was "more variety" in the original game's mix and better representation within certain genres, while Michael Brown of 1UP.com favored DJ Hero's set for "how it mixed together frequently disparate tracks" and that many mixes in the sequel favored too much of one song in the mix.

Song 1 title	Artist 1	Song 2 title	Artist 2	Mix artist	Venue	Battle Mix?	Setlist	BPM
"Hot in Herre"	Nelly	"Regulate"	Warren G featuring Nate Dogg	FreeStyleGames	Ibiza	No	West Coast Beats	100
"Galvanize"	The Chemical Brothers	"Leave Home"	The Chemical Brothers	FreeStyleGames	Shanghai	No	Dance Anthems, Checkpoint Battle (vs. Mixy Trix)	104
"Replay"	Iyaz	"Rude Boy"	Rihanna	FreeStyleGames	Ibiza	No	Radio Jams	90
"Bounce" (remix)	MSTRKRFT featuring N.O.R.E.	N/A	N/A	FreeStyleGames	London	Yes	DJ Battle (vs. David Guetta)	
"Don't Cha"	Pussycat Dolls featuring Busta Rhymes	"I Know You Want Me (Calle Ocho)"	Pitbull	FreeStyleGames	Ibiza	No	Radio Jams	127
"Where's Your Head At?"	Basement Jaxx	"Bonkers"	Dizzee Rascal & Armand Van Helden	FreeStyleGames	Shanghai	No	Dance Anthems	127
"Just Dance"	Lady Gaga featuring Colby O'Donis	"Ghosts N Stuff"	Deadmau5	FreeStyleGames	Shanghai	No	Deadmau5 Megamix	128
"California Love"	2Pac featuring Dr. Dre	"Nothin' on You"	B.o.B featuring Bruno Mars	FreeStyleGames	Berlin	No	Vocoder	100
"I Will Be Here"	Tiësto featuring Sneaky Sound System	"Speed Rail"	Tiësto	FreeStyleGames	Las Vegas	No	Tiësto Megamix	132
"Nasty"	Janet Jackson	"D.A.N.C.E."	Justice	FreeStyleGames	Shanghai	No	Pop Mixes, Checkpoint Battle (vs. Cool Papa G)	112
"War"	Edwin Starr	"Waters of Nazareth"	Justice	FreeStyleGames	Shanghai	Yes	DJ Battle (vs. Deadmau5)	
"Informer"	Snow	"ABC"	The Jackson 5	FreeStyleGames	Ibiza	No	Opening Night	96
"Hero"	Nas featuring Keri Hilson	"Get By"	Talib Kweli	FreeStyleGames	Las Vegas	No	East Coast Beats	95
"Acapella" (remix)	Kelis	N/A	N/A	FreeStyleGames	London	No	David Guetta Megamix	128
"Human After All" (remix)	Daft Punk	N/A	N/A	FreeStyleGames	Ibiza: Encore	No	Bonus Setlist	136
"Midnight in a Perfect World" (remix)	DJ Shadow	N/A	N/A	FreeStyleGames	Ibiza: Encore	No	DJ Shadow	79
"ABC"	The Jackson 5	"O.P.P."	Naughty By Nature	A-Trak	N/A	Yes	N/A	
"American Boy"	Estelle featuring Kanye West	"Good Times"	Chic	FreeStyleGames	N/A	No	N/A	118
"Heads Will Roll" (A-Trak remix)	Yeah Yeah Yeahs	"Where's Your Head At?"	Basement Jaxx	FreeStyleGames	Las Vegas	No	A-Trak, Checkpoint Battle (vs. Jugglernort)	127
"Love Don't Let Me Go (Walking Away)"	David Guetta & The Egg	"Low"	Flo Rida	FreeStyleGames	London	No	David Guetta Megamix, Checkpoint Battle (vs. DJ Kid Itch)	130
"Jump Around"	House of Pain	"Put Your Hands Where My Eyes Could See"	Busta Rhymes	FreeStyleGames	Shanghai	No	Bonus Setlist	108
"Axel F"	Harold Faltermeyer	"Get Busy"	Sean Paul	FreeStyleGames	Berlin	No	Bonus Setlist	114
"Galang"	M.I.A.	"Under Me Sleng Teng"	Wayne Smith	FreeStyleGames	Berlin	No	Diplo	94
"Jungle Boogie"	Kool & the Gang	"The Message"	Grandmaster Flash and the Furious Five featuring Melle Mel and Duke Bootee	FreeStyleGames	Ibiza	No	Opening Night	103
"In Da Club"	50 Cent	"Get Low"	Lil Jon & the East Side Boyz featuring Ying Yang Twins	FreeStyleGames	Las Vegas	No	East Coast Beats	95
"I Want Your Soul"	Armand Van Helden	"Push It"	Salt-N-Pepa	FreeStyleGames	Berlin	No	House	128
"Lollipop"	Lil Wayne featuring Static Major	"Not Afraid"	Eminem	FreeStyleGames	London	No	Hot 100	86
"Twist 'Em Out"	Dillinja and Skibadee	"Welcome To Jamrock"	Damian Marley	FreeStyleGames	Ibiza: Encore	No	Closing Party	172
"Ridin'"	Chamillionaire	"Crank That (Soulja Boy)"	Soulja Boy Tell 'Em	FreeStyleGames	Ibiza	No	Radio Jams	72
"I'm Not Alone"	Calvin Harris	"Show Me Love" (StoneBridge radio edit)	Robin S	FreeStyleGames	Shanghai	No	Dance Anthems	135
"Push The Feeling On (MK Mix 95)"	Nightcrawlers	"I Know You Want Me (Calle Ocho)"	Pitbull	FreeStyleGames	Berlin	No	House, Checkpoint Battle (vs. Vunda Boy)	130
"Planet Rock"	Afrika Bambaataa and The Soul Sonic Force	"Push It"	Salt-N-Pepa	FreeStyleGames	London	No	Old Skool, Checkpoint Battle (vs. Kitty Smash)	130
"LoveGame"	Lady Gaga	"Heartless"	Kanye West	FreeStyleGames	London	No	Bonus Setlist	104
"Black & Gold"	Sam Sparro	"Love Is Gone" (Fred Rister & Joachim Garraud radio edit)	David Guetta featuring Chris Willis	FreeStyleGames	London	No	David Guetta Megamix	136
"You Gonna Want Me"	Tiga	"The Way I Are"	Timbaland featuring Keri Hilson	FreeStyleGames	Berlin	No	House	125
"Say Whoa"	A-Trak	"Bounce"	MSTRKRFT featuring N.O.R.E.	FreeStyleGames	Las Vegas	No	A-Trak	128
"Pump Up The Volume"	M|}A|}R|}R|S	"Buffalo Gals"	Malcolm McLaren	FreeStyleGames	Berlin	Yes	DJ Battle (vs. RZA)	
"Who Am I (What's My Name)?"	Snoop Dogg	"Oops (Oh My)"	Tweet featuring Missy Elliott	FreeStyleGames	Ibiza	No	West Coast Beats	96
"Favorite DJ"	Clinton Sparks, DJ Class, & Jermaine Dupri	"In The Ayer"	Flo Rida featuring will.i.am	FreeStyleGames	Shanghai	No	Pop Mixes	128
"I Can't Live Without My Radio"	LL Cool J	"The Message"	Grandmaster Flash and the Furious Five featuring Melle Mel and Duke Bootee	RZA	Berlin	No	RZA Megamix	98
"Welcome to Jamrock"	Damian Marley	"A Fifth of Beethoven"	Walter Murphy	RZA	Berlin	No	RZA Megamix	90
"Apocalypse" (remix)	Sparfunk & D-Code	N/A	N/A	FreeStyleGames	N/A	Yes	N/A	
"California Love" (remix)	2Pac featuring Dr. Dre	N/A	N/A	FreeStyleGames	Ibiza	No	West Coast Beats	95
"Bonkers"	Dizzee Rascal & Armand Van Helden	"Omen"	The Prodigy	FreeStyleGames	N/A	Yes	N/A	
"Groove Is In The Heart"	Deee-Lite	"Le Freak"	Chic	FreeStyleGames	Ibiza	No	Opening Night	118
"Pon De Floor"	Major Lazer feat. Vybz Kartel	"Axel F"	Harold Faltermeyer	Diplo	Berlin	No	Diplo	127
"In Da Club"	50 Cent	"Go DJ"	Lil' Wayne	FreeStyleGames	N/A	Yes	N/A	
"Say Something"	Timbaland featuring Drake	"Put On"	Young Jeezy featuring Kanye West	FreeStyleGames	London	No	Hot 100	72
"Love Lockdown"	Kanye West	"Bad Girls"	Donna Summer	FreeStyleGames	Berlin	No	Vocoder	120
"Memories"	David Guetta featuring Kid Cudi	"Bashy Bashy"	Pirate Soundsystem	FreeStyleGames	London	No	David Guetta Megamix	133
"Lollipop"	Lil Wayne featuring Static Major	"Low"	Flo Rida	FreeStyleGames	Berlin	No	Vocoder	130
"I Can't Live Without My Radio"	LL Cool J	"Good Times"	Chic	FreeStyleGames	N/A	Yes	N/A	
"Get Ur Freak On"	Missy Elliott	"Infiltrate"	Sean Paul	FreeStyleGames	Las Vegas	No	Bonus Setlist	92
"I'm Not Alone"	Calvin Harris	"Blue Monday"	New Order	FreeStyleGames	Berlin	No	House	135
"Love Lockdown"	Kanye West	"The Day That Never Comes"	Metallica	DJ Shadow	Ibiza: Encore	No	DJ Shadow	119
"Pump Up The Volume"	M|}A|}R|}R|S	"Put Your Hands Where My Eyes Could See"	Busta Rhymes	DJ Jazzy Jeff	London	No	Old Skool	100
"War"	Edwin Starr	"Superstition"	Stevie Wonder	FreeStyleGames	Ibiza	No	Bonus Setlist	111
"Pon De Replay"	Rihanna	"Get Busy"	Sean Paul	FreeStyleGames	Shanghai	No	Pop Mixes	99
"Bad Girls"	Donna Summer	"Jam On It"	Newcleus	FreeStyleGames	London	No	Old Skool	121
"Heartless"	Kanye West	"Midnight in a Perfect World"	DJ Shadow	Diplo	Berlin	No	Diplo	85
"Blue Monday"	New Order	"Pon De Floor"	Major Lazer feat. Vybz Kartel	FreeStyleGames	N/A	Yes	N/A	
"Twist 'Em Out"	Dillinja and Skibadee	"Get Ur Freak On"	Missy Elliott	DJ Z-Trip	Las Vegas	No	Z-Trip, Checkpoint Battle (vs. Cleetus Cuts)	176
"Busy Child" ("Still Busy After All These Years" remix)	The Crystal Method	"Planet Rock"	Afrika Bambaataa and The Soul Sonic Force	DJ Z-Trip	Las Vegas	No	Z-Trip	126
"D.A.N.C.E." (remix)	Justice	N/A	N/A	A-Trak	Las Vegas	No	A-Trak	113
"Put On"	Young Jeezy featuring Kanye West	"Enuff" (DJ Fresh remix)	DJ Shadow featuring Q-Tip and Lateef	DJ Shadow	Ibiza: Encore	No	DJ Shadow	169
"Galvanize" (remix)	The Chemical Brothers featuring Q-Tip	N/A	N/A	Scratch Perverts	Ibiza: Encore	No	Closing Party, Checkpoint Battle (vs. Candy Nova)	104
"Omen"	The Prodigy	"The Box"	Orbital	Scratch Perverts	Las Vegas	Yes	DJ Battle (vs. Tiësto)	
"Super Battle Breaks"	DJ Qbert	N/A	N/A	DJ Qbert	Ibiza: Encore	Yes	DJ Battle (vs. DJ Qbert)	
"Jam On It" (remix)	Newcleus	N/A	N/A	DJ Qbert	Ibiza	Yes	DJ Battle (vs. DJ Qbert)	
"Killer" (Tiësto remix)	Adamski	N/A	N/A	DJ Tiësto	Las Vegas	No	Tiësto Megamix	128
"Bad Romance" (Tiësto remix)	Lady Gaga	N/A	N/A	DJ Tiësto	Las Vegas	No	Tiësto Megamix	128
"Say Whoa" (remix)	A-Trak	N/A	N/A	FreeStyleGames	N/A	Yes	N/A	
"Dollaz & Sense" (remix)	Blakroc featuring Pharoahe Monch & RZA	N/A	N/A	FreeStyleGames	Berlin	No	RZA Megamix	92
"I Remember" (remix)	Deadmau5 & Kaskade	N/A	N/A	FreeStyleGames	Shanghai	No	Deadmau5 Megamix	128
"American Boy" (remix)	Estelle featuring Kanye West	N/A	N/A	FreeStyleGames	London	No	Hot 100	118
"Stylo" (remix)	Gorillaz featuring Mos Def & Bobby Womack	N/A	N/A	FreeStyleGames	Shanghai	No	Pop Mixes	100
"Jump Around" (remix)	House of Pain	N/A	N/A	FreeStyleGames	N/A	Yes	N/A	
"Move for Me" (remix)	Kaskade & Deadmau5	N/A	N/A	FreeStyleGames	Shanghai	No	Deadmau5 Megamix	128
"You're a Jerk" (remix)	New Boyz	N/A	N/A	FreeStyleGames	N/A	Yes	N/A	
"Chain Gang" (remix)	Sam Cooke	N/A	N/A	FreeStyleGames	N/A	Yes	N/A	
"Mo' Money, Mo' Problems" (remix)	The Notorious B.I.G. featuring Mase & Diddy	N/A	N/A	FreeStyleGames	Las Vegas	No	East Coast Beats	104
"Firestarter" (remix)	The Prodigy	N/A	N/A	FreeStyleGames	Ibiza: Encore	No	Closing Party	141
"C'mon" (remix)	Tiësto & Diplo	N/A	N/A	FreeStyleGames	N/A	Yes	N/A	

=== Downloadable content ===
DJ Hero 2 supports downloadable content in the form of new mixes that can be purchased from the consoles' respective online stores. A free add-on allows players to purchase and play existing downloadable content from the first game to use within DJ Hero 2. Activision's February 2011 decision to shutter their Guitar Hero development initially stated that no further downloadable content will be forthcoming for the title, but due to "continued support" from their fanbase, Activision has since clarified it will continue to release downloadable content for the game. Activision has stated that it will provide packs in March and April 2011 based on work that was ongoing at the time of their closure of the Guitar Hero division. All of the DJ Hero DLC packs (along with the DLC of Guitar Hero) were taken offline on March 31, 2014, and are no longer available for download. However, they can be reinstalled if the player has downloaded any DLC pack before the removal.

Song 1 title	Artist 1	Song 2 title	Artist 2	Mix artist	Mix pack	Release date
"OMG" (remix)	Usher featuring will.i.am	N/A	N/A	FreeStyleGames	Hit Makers Mix Pack	Nov. 2, 2010
"Umbrella"	Rihanna	"Let's Get It On"	Marvin Gaye	FreeStyleGames	Hit Makers Mix Pack	Nov. 2, 2010
"Shutterbugg"	Big Boi featuring Cutty	"Return of the Mack"	Mark Morrison	FreeStyleGames	Hit Makers Mix Pack	Nov. 2, 2010
"Hustler"	Simian Mobile Disco	"Pump Up the Jam"	Technotronic	FreeStyleGames	Electro Hits Mix Pack	Nov. 16, 2010
"I'm in the House" (remix)	Steve Aoki featuring Zuper Blahq	N/A	N/A	FreeStyleGames	Electro Hits Mix Pack	Nov. 16, 2010
"I'm in Miami Bitch"	LMFAO	"Shake & Pop"	Green Velvet	FreeStyleGames	Electro Hits Mix Pack	Nov. 16, 2010
"Feel It in My Bones" (remix)	Tiësto Ft. Tegan and Sara	N/A	N/A	FreeStyleGames	Tiësto Mix Pack Presented By Coca-Cola	Nov. 23, 2010
"Knock You Out"	Tiësto Ft. Emily Haines	Young Lions	Tiësto	FreeStyleGames	Tiësto Mix Pack Presented By Coca-Cola	Nov. 23, 2010
"Louder Than Boom"	Tiësto	Traffic	Tiësto	FreeStyleGames	Tiësto Mix Pack Presented By Coca-Cola	Nov. 23, 2010
"Debaser"	Pixies	"Invaders Must Die"	The Prodigy	FreeStyleGames	Hard Edge Mix Pack	Nov. 30, 2010
"Body Movin'"	Beastie Boys	"Rock and Roll Is Dead"	Lenny Kravitz	FreeStyleGames	Hard Edge Mix Pack	Nov. 30, 2010
"Human Beat Box"	Fat Boys	"King of the Beats"	Mantronix	FreeStyleGames	Old Skool Mix Pack	Dec. 14, 2010
"Whoomp! (There It Is)"	Tag Team	"The 900 Number"	45 King	FreeStyleGames	Old Skool Mix Pack	Dec. 14, 2010
"Triple Trouble"	Beastie Boys	"Funky Cold Medina"	Tone Loc	FreeStyleGames	Old Skool Mix Pack	Dec. 14, 2010
"The Catalyst" (Does It Offend You, Yeah? remix)	Linkin Park	N/A	N/A	FreeStyleGames	Linkin Park Mix Pack	Dec. 21, 2010
"When They Come for Me" (Diplo remix)	Linkin Park	N/A	N/A	Diplo	Linkin Park Mix Pack	Dec. 21, 2010
"Pts.OF.Athrty" (remix)	Linkin Park	N/A	N/A	FreeStyleGames	Linkin Park Mix Pack	Dec. 21, 2010
"For An Angel"	Paul van Dyk	"9pm (Till I Come)"	ATB	FreeStyleGames	Trance Anthems Mix Pack	Jan. 18, 2011
"Not Over" (remix)	Paul Oakenfold featuring Ryan Tedder	N/A	N/A	FreeStyleGames	Trance Anthems Mix Pack	Jan. 18, 2011
"Punk"	Ferry Corsten	"Imagine"	Armin Van Buuren	FreeStyleGames	Trance Anthems Mix Pack	Jan. 18, 2011
"Salt In the Wounds" (remix)	Pendulum	N/A	N/A	FreeStyleGames	Pendulum Mix Pack	Feb. 15, 2011
"Watercolour" (remix)	Pendulum	N/A	N/A	FreeStyleGames	Pendulum Mix Pack	Feb. 15, 2011
"Set Me On Fire" (remix)	Pendulum	N/A	N/A	FreeStyleGames	Pendulum Mix Pack	Feb. 15, 2011
"My World Premiere"	Charizma & Peanut Butter Wolf	"The Red"	Jaylib	FreeStyleGames	Indie Hip Hop Mix Pack	Mar. 15, 2011
"Party Hard"	The Perceptionists featuring Guru and Camu Tao	"Ghostwriter"	RJD2	FreeStyleGames	Indie Hip Hop Mix Pack	Mar. 15, 2011
"The Best Day" (remix)	Atmosphere	N/A	N/A	FreeStyleGames	Indie Hip Hop Mix Pack	Mar. 15, 2011
"We No Speak Americano" (remix)	Yolanda Be Cool & DCUP	N/A	N/A	FreeStyleGames	Ultra Mix Pack	April 15, 2011
"House Music" (remix)	Benny Benassi	N/A	N/A	FreeStyleGames	Ultra Mix Pack	April 15, 2011
"Sofi Needs A Ladder" (remix)	Deadmau5	N/A	N/A	FreeStyleGames	Ultra Mix Pack	April 15, 2011
