= Club Life, Vol. 1 - Las Vegas =

Compilation album by Tiësto
- Released: 5 April 2011
- Genres: Progressive house; electro house
- Length: 1:17:53
- Labels: Musical Freedom; PIAS
- Producers: Tiësto; Henrik B; Tom Hangs; Axel Bauer; Lanford; Rebecca & Fiona; Marcel Woods; Angger Dimas; Alex Sayz; Moguai; Thomas Gold; Boys Will Be Boys; Hardwell; Kaskade; Sultan + Ned Shepard; Diplo

Tiësto chronology
Kaleidoscope: Remixed (2010)	Club Life, Vol. 1 - Las Vegas (2011)	Club Life: Volume Two Miami (2012)

Singles from Club Life: Volume One Las Vegas
- 1. "C'mon" Released: 11 May 2010; 2. "C'Mon (Catch 'Em By Surprise)" Released: 14 January 2011; 3. "Zero 76" Released: 7 February 2011

Club Life, Vol. 1 - Las Vegas is a mix compilation album by internationally acclaimed DJ/Producer Tiësto, released in 2011 and promoted globally with a live set show tour under the same name. It is the first installment of his new compilation series called Club Life.

The album's name was given to honor the live set held by Tiësto at the Hard Rock Cafe & Casino, The Joint in Las Vegas, Nevada, where he signed DJ Residency. The track list was chosen based on his favorite tracks played throughout the year, solidifying after his preview album Kaleidoscope, the DJ's newest venture into a more wide variety of house music elements; as opposed to his traditional focus in playing trance music almost exclusively.

== Track listing ==
No.	Title	Artist	Length
1.	"Now & Forever" (Original Mix)	Henrik B featuring Christian Älvestam	7:47
2.	"Blessed" (Original Mix)	Tom Hangs featuring Shermanology	4:53
3.	"I Belong to You" (Axel Bauer and Lanford Remix)	Cazzi Opeia	6:00
4.	"Slumber" (Original Mix)	Steve Forte Rio featuring Lindsey Ray	5:45
5.	"Girls with Bangs" (Tiësto Remix)	Lune	5:52
6.	"Bullets" (Club Mix)	Rebecca & Fiona	5:35
7.	"Heiress of Valentina" (Alesso Remix)	Dúné	6:23
8.	"Don't Ditch" (Original Mix)	Tiësto and Marcel Woods	5:38
9.	"Young at Heart" (Angger Dimas Remix)	Amy Meredith	5:14
10.	"Faces" (Original Mix)	Alex Sayz	5:15
11.	"We Want Your Soul" (Thomas Gold Remix)	Moguai	4:30
12.	"We Rock" (Original Mix)	Boys Will Be Boys	6:02
13.	"Zero 76" (Original Mix)	Tiësto and Hardwell	5:00
14.	"Fire in Your New Shoes" (Sultan & Ned Shepard's Electric Daisy Remix)	Kaskade	5:38
15.	"C'mon" (Original Mix)	Tiësto vs. Diplo	4:06

== Charts ==
=== Weekly charts ===
Chart (2011)	Peak position
Austrian Albums (Ö3 Austria)	50
Canadian Albums (Billboard)	7
Dutch Albums (Album Top 100)	4
French Albums (SNEP)	134
German Albums (Offizielle Top 100)	70
Swiss Albums (Schweizer Hitparade)	13
UK Dance Albums (Official Charts)	11
US Top Dance Albums (Billboard)	3
US Independent Albums (Billboard)	11

=== Year-end charts ===
Chart (2011)	Position
US Top Dance/Electronic Albums (Billboard)	20
