= I'm Not Leaving =

I'm Not Leaving may refer to:

- "I'm Not Leaving", a 2019 song by Keane from Cause and Effect
- "I'm Not Leaving", a 2011 song by Sneaky Sound System from From Here to Anywhere
- "I'm Not Leaving", a 2009 song by Uncle Kracker from Happy Hour
