= Work hard, play hard (disambiguation) =

"Work Hard, Play Hard" is a song by American rapper Wiz Khalifa.

Work hard, play hard may also refer to:

- "Work Hard, Play Hard" (Tiësto song), a single by Dutch DJ Tiësto
- Work Hard – Play Hard, a documentary film by German film director Carmen Losmann
- "Work hard play hard", the figurative English translation of the motto of the Camborne School of Mines (Laboris gloria Ludi)
- "Work Hard, Play Hard", an episode of the 2017 TV series One Day at a Time

== See also ==
- "Work Hard, Play Harder", a 2009 song co-written and recorded by American country artist Gretchen Wilson
- "Play Hard", a song by French DJ and record producer David Guetta
- "Creeque Alley", a 1966 song which includes the line, "Don't you work as hard as you play"
