= Feel It (Three 6 Mafia song) =

Single by Three 6 Mafia, Sean Kingston and Flo Rida vs. Tiësto
- Released: December 1, 2009
- Recorded: 2009
- Genre: Hip house; electro house
- Length: 4:02
- Label: Columbia; Sony; Hypnotize Minds
- Songwriter(s): Jordan Houston, Paul Beauregard, Tramar Dillard, Justin Franks, Brandon Green, Tijs Verwest, Waakop Reijers, Tony Butler
- Producer(s): Tiësto; DJ Frank E

Three 6 Mafia singles chronology
"Lil Freak (Ugh, Ugh, Ugh)" (2009)	"Feel It" (2009)	"Go Hard" (2013)

Sean Kingston singles chronology
"Face Drop" (2009)	"Feel It" (2009)	"Eenie Meenie" (2010)

Flo Rida singles chronology
"Available" (2009)	"Feel It" (2009)	"Club Can't Handle Me" (2010)

Tiësto singles chronology
"Escape Me" (2009)	"Feel It" (2009)	"Who Wants to Be Alone" (2010)

Music video
- "Three 6 Mafia feat. Tiësto - Feel It (Official Music Video)" on YouTube

"Feel It" is a song by American hip hop group Three 6 Mafia. It features Tiësto, Sean Kingston and Flo Rida and was produced by Tiësto and DJ Frank E, co-written by Bei Maejor and mixed by Greg Wells. The song was released on December 1, 2009. The song debuted at number 65 on the Canadian Hot 100 and reached number 33 on the next week. The song debuted at number 78 on the Billboard Hot 100.

== Music video ==
On October 9, 2009, Three 6 Mafia shot the video for "Feel It" at The Bank club at Bellagio in Las Vegas. Parts of it were also filmed along the Las Vegas Strip. The music video premiered on Tiësto's Official YouTube Channel on November 13, 2009. Although Flo Rida's verse is included, he does not appear in the music video. It was directed and edited by Rich Newey. The music video has been viewed over 55 million times on YouTube. The video version of the song differs slightly from the single that was released online, as there is more of a background beat as well as an additional verse from Juicy J, which was not included on the leaked version. The order of appearance also differs in the video, which starts with Juicy J, DJ Paul then Flo Rida (with Sean Kingston doing the chorus); whereas in the leaked single, the order is Flo Rida then DJ Paul, with Sean Kingston again doing the chorus.

== Charts ==
On the week ending March 20, 2010, "Feel It" debuted at number 78 on the Billboard Hot 100.

Chart (2009–10)	Peak position
Austria (Ö3 Austria Top 40)	20
Canada (Canadian Hot 100)	33
Germany (GfK)	21
Ireland (IRMA)	40
Netherlands (Single Top 100)	62
Poland (Dance Top 50)	44
UK Singles (OCC)	83
UK Dance (OCC)	7
US Billboard Hot 100	78
US Billboard Hot Dance Club Songs	4

== Certifications ==
Region	Certification	Certified units/sales
Canada (Music Canada)	Gold	40,000^{*}
^{*} Sales figures based on certification alone.
