= Maximal Crazy =

Single by Tiësto

from the album Club Life, Vol. 2 - Miami
- Released: 5 September 2011
- Recorded: 2011
- Genre: Electro house
- Length: 4:16 (radio edit); 6:49 (original mix)
- Label: Musical Freedom; PIAS
- Songwriters: Tijs Verwest; Sjoerd Janssen; Wouter Janssen
- Producers: Tiësto; Showtek

Tiësto singles chronology
"Work Hard, Play Hard" (2011)	"Maximal Crazy" (2011)	"The First Note Is Silent" (2011)

"Maximal Crazy" is a single by Dutch DJ Tiësto. It was released on 5 September 2011 in the Netherlands, United Kingdom and Finland, later releasing in the United States and Canada on iTunes on 20 September 2011. It is the first single from the Tiësto mixed compilation Club Life, Vol. 2 - Miami.

== Music video ==
The music video premiered on Tiësto's official YouTube Channel on 4 September 2011. The video was shot at Electric Daisy Carnival in Las Vegas, an event that perfectly summed up the title and the spirit of the song. The video begins with Tiësto in a helicopter flying over Las Vegas. The remainder of the video is "Crazy" scenes from the festival.

== Legacy ==
Tiësto performed the song at the Stereosonic Music Festival in 2012, including both the original version and "Coldplay vs. Tiësto, R3hab & Swanky Tunes – Every Teardrop Is Maximal Crazy (Dr. Pihl Mashup)".

Billboard, ranking 20 Best Songs by Tiësto in 2017, put "Maximal Crazy" at the seventh position, describing it as "grungy, energetic festival heavy-hitter", which Tiësto "once played seven times in a row" during one show.

== Track listings ==
Digital download (MF008)

1. "Maximal Crazy" (Original Mix) - 6:49

CD (MF008)

1. "Maximal Crazy" (Radio Edit) - 4:16
2. "Maximal Crazy" (Original Mix) - 6:49
3. "Maximal Crazy" (Bassjackers Remix) - 6:02
4. "Maximal Crazy" (R3HAB & Swanky Tunes Remix) - 7:00

Remixes (MF010)

1. "Maximal Crazy" (Bassjackers Remix) - 6:02
2. "Maximal Crazy" (R3HAB & Swanky Tunes Remix) - 7:00

2017 Translucent Yellow 7"

1. "Maximal Crazy" (Original Mix) - 6:49
2. "Maximal Crazy" (Radio Edit) - 4:16

== Charts ==
Chart (2011)	Peak Position
Belgium (Ultratip Bubbling Under Flanders)	30
Belgium (Ultratop Flanders Dance)	29
Belgium (Ultratop Wallonia Dance Bubbling Under)	14
Netherlands (Mega Dance Top 30)	18

2025 weekly chart performance for "Maximal Crazy"
Chart (2025)	Peak position
Russia Streaming (TopHit)	96
