= Really Want to See You Again =

Single by Sneaky Sound System

from the album From Here to Anywhere
- Released: 9 March 2012
- Genre: Electropop, dance, house
- Length: 4:04
- Label: Modular
- Songwriters: Angus McDonald and Connie Mitchell,

Sneaky Sound System singles chronology
"Big" (2011)	"Really Want to See You Again" (2012)	"Friends" (2012)

Really Want to See You Again is the third single from Australian band Sneaky Sound System's third album From Here to Anywhere. The music video premiered on 16 March on Channel V

== Track listing ==
Digital EP

1. Really Want to See You Again
2. Really Want to see You Again (Kink remix)
3. Really Want to See You Again (Azari & Ill remix)
4. Really Want to See You Again (Jam X-Press remix)

== Chart performance ==
The track was sent to radio in December, 2012 and has peaked at #47 on the Australian Airplay Chart. It has so far failed to reach the top 100 ARIA Singles chart.

Chart	Peak
Australian ARIA Club Chart	11
Australian Airplay Chart	47
