= We Love (Sneaky Sound System song) =

Single by Sneaky Sound System

Single by Sneaky Sound System

from the album From Here To Anywhere
- Released: 27 May 2011
- Genre: Electropop, dance, house
- Length: 2:51
- Label: Modular
- Songwriter(s): Black Angus, Connie Mitchell

Sneaky Sound System singles chronology
"I Will Be Here" (2009)	"We Love" (2011)	"Big" (2011)

"We Love" is the first single from Sneaky Sound System's third studio album From Here To Anywhere. The Single debuted at 41 on the Australian Singles Chart and peaked at number 29.

== Music video ==
The music video for We Love was directed by Ollie Evans. It features suggestive and deliberately misleading sexual silhouettes while a series of phallic and/or double-entendre items are also shown

== Track listing ==
iTunes Single
No.	Title	Length
1.	"We Love" (Original)	2:51

== Chart performance ==
Chart (2011)	Peak position
Australia (ARIA)	29
Australian ARIA Club Chart	4

== Release history ==
Region	Date	Label	Format
Australia	27 May 2011	Modular	Digital download
