= Zero 76 =

2011 single by Tiësto and Hardwell

Single by Tiësto + Hardwell

from the album Club Life, Vol. 1 - Las Vegas and Hardwell Presents Revealed Volume 2
- Released: 7 February 2011
- Recorded: 2010
- Genre: Big room house
- Length: 3:13 (radio edit); 6:06 (original mix)
- Label: Musical Freedom; PIAS
- Songwriters: Tijs Verwest, Robbert van de Corput
- Producers: Tiësto, Hardwell

Tiësto singles chronology
| "C'Mon (Catch 'Em By Surprise)" (2011) | "Zero 76" (2011) | "Work Hard, Play Hard" (2011) |

Hardwell singles chronology
| "Asteroid" (2010) | "Zero 76" (2011) | "Encoded" (2011) |

"Zero 76" is an instrumental track by Dutch DJs Tiësto and Hardwell. It was released on 7 February 2011 in the Netherlands and the United Kingdom on iTunes. It is the second single from the Tiësto mixed compilation Club Life, Vol. 1 - Las Vegas and the first single from the Hardwell mixed compilation Hardwell Presents Revealed Volume 2. The song's title is a reference to the phone code for their home town Breda (076).

== Music video ==
The music video premiered on Tiësto's official YouTube Channel on 25 February 2011.

== Track listing ==
Digital Download (MF001)

1. "Zero 76" (Original Mix) - 6:06

Free digital download

1. "Zero 76" (twoloud Remix) - 4:42

2017 Translucent Hot Pink 7"

1. "Zero 76" (Extended Mix) - 6:06
2. "Zero 76" (Radio Edit) - 3:13

== Charts ==
| Chart (2011) | Peak Position |
|---|---|
| Belgium (Ultratop 50 Flanders) | 49 |
| Netherlands (Single Top 100) | 19 |
