= Big (Sneaky Sound System song) =

Single by Sneaky Sound System

from the album From Here to Anywhere
- Released: August 19, 2011
- Genre: Electropop, dance, house
- Length: 4:25
- Label: Modular
- Songwriter(s): Angus McDonald, Connie Mitchell

Sneaky Sound System singles chronology
"We Love" (2011)	"Big" (2011)	"Really Want to See You Again" (2012)

Big is the second single to be taken from Australian dance-duo Sneaky Sound System.

== Release and promotion ==
The music video for Big was released to the band's YouTube channel on September 12, 2011, and was shot in Las Vegas. The track has been described as "a soaring, majestic pop song with undeniable magic".

The track was performed on popular breakfast show Sunrise.

== Track listing ==
Digital Single

1. Big

Digital EP

1. Big
2. Big (John Dahlback remix)
3. Big (Oliver remix)
4. Big (Goodwill & Black Angus remix)
5. Always By Your Side (Nicolas Jaar 'Big' version)

== Charts ==
Chart (2011)	Peak
ARIA Australian Singles Chart	58
ARIA Australian Artists Singles	6
Australian ARIA Dance Singles	16
Australian ARIA Club Chart	2
