= Speed Rail (composition) =

Promotional single by Tiësto
- Released: 10 September 2010
- Genre: Progressive trance
- Length: 4:24
- Label: Musical Freedom; PIAS
- Songwriter(s): Tijs Verwest
- Producer(s): Tiësto

"Speed Rail" is an instrumental composition by Dutch disc jockey and producer Tiësto. It was released on 10 September 2010 in the Netherlands as a promotional single.

== Background and release ==
"Speed Rail" was produced by Tiësto to be included in the video game DJ Hero 2. The composition was released on Juno Download for free.

== Music video ==
The music video premiered on Tiësto's official YouTube channel on October 26, 2010. The music video features animated footages taken from DJ Hero 2 showing Tiësto mixing.

== Track listing ==
Digital Download (MFPROMO 001)

1. "Speed Rail" - 4:24

== Charts ==
Chart (2010)	Peak position
Russia (Tophit)	172

== In popular culture ==
The composition appears in DJ Hero 2, mixed together with "I Will Be Here".
