= Work Hard, Play Hard (Tiësto song) =

Single by Tiësto featuring Kay

from the album What's Next Exclusive Mix
- Released: 10 August 2011
- Recorded: 2011
- Genre: Trouse (Original Mix) Electro house (Autoerotique Remix)
- Length: 6:26
- Label: Musical Freedom; PIAS
- Songwriter(s): Tijs Verwest, Kristin Boutilier
- Producer(s): Tiësto

Tiësto singles chronology
"Zero 76" (2011)	"Work Hard, Play Hard" (2011)	"Maximal Crazy" (2011)

Kay singles chronology
"Pick Your Poison" (2011)	"Work Hard, Play Hard" (2011)	"Singularity" (2013)

"Work Hard, Play Hard" is a song by Dutch disc jockey and producer Tiësto with vocals from Canadian singer Kay. It was released on 10 August 2011 in the Netherlands. The electro house remix made by Canadian band Autoerotique gained more success than the original mix.

== Background and release ==
Tiësto declared about the song :

"Work Hard, Play Hard" is a track that fit for megaclubs and summer car trips alike. A mix of funky electro synths, driving percussion and a killer lead line, Kay then hits us with those perfectly pop vocals. Featuring a monster breakdown that rattles the room, the track is built for summer and fall dance floors globally.

The song was included in a free DJ mix album, What's Next Exclusive Mix, released by Tiësto in cooperation with the flash memory brand SanDisk. The album was available on their website and its downloading gave the access to a promotion code for the brand's products.

A remix competition was organized online. Tiësto released some parts of the tracks as free on Juno Download to realise it. The winner is the Canadian band Paris FZ & Simo T who produced a progressive house remix of the song.

== Music video ==
A music video was realised for the Autoerotique Remix. It was directed by Loren Semmens and produced by Sean Miyashiro and Prem Kumta / Adam Hobbs of the Flavor Group. It's a gathering of Tiësto fans' videos all over the world during the Kaleidoscope World Tour, composed of 150 dates between 2009 and 2011.

== Track listing ==
Digital download (MF007)

1. "Work Hard, Play Hard" (Original Mix) - 6:26
2. "Work Hard, Play Hard" (Autoerotique Remix) - 5:11

Digital download remix contest winners

1. "Work Hard, Play Hard" (Paris FZ & Simo T's Contest Winning Remix) - 5:07

== Charts ==
Chart (2011)	Peak Position
Canada (Canadian Hot 100)	56
