= Forever (Wolfgang Gartner and will.i.am song) =

Single by will.i.am and Wolfgang Gartner

from the album Weekend in America
- Released: October 9, 2011
- Recorded: 2011
- Genre: Hip house; electro house
- Length: 2:52
- Label: Ministry of Sound
- Songwriters: will.i.am; Wolfgang Gartner
- Producer: Wolfgang Gartner

will.i.am singles chronology
| "Free" (2011) | "Forever" (2011) | "T.H.E. (The Hardest Ever)" (2011) |

Wolfgang Gartner singles chronology
| "Animal Rights" (2010) | "Forever" (2011) | "Hell Yeah!" (2011) |

"Forever" is a hip house song by American rapper will.i.am and DJ/Producer Wolfgang Gartner, released as a single on October 9, 2011. The track was released on Ministry of Sound and is included in Gartner's debut album Weekend in America. The track peaked at number 43 on the UK Singles Chart and number 9 on the UK Dance Chart, on the week ending October 15, 2011. Alternative artwork was released in the UK credited as 'Wolfgang Gartner featuring Will.i.am'.

== Music video ==
The music video for the track premiered on June 1, 2011, via the official Ultra Records, a sub-label of Ministry of Sound, YouTube account. The video begins with a number of people dancing in a club. Two of them are showing entering the club toilets and engaging in sex. The scene cuts to will.i.am as a sperm, and continues by showing milestones up to and after his birth. It continues by detailing events in his childhood, before culminating when he is a full-grown adult. The video is three minutes and forty-nine seconds in length. A shortened version was released in the UK lasting two minutes and fifty-four seconds in length. It was released on August 9, 2011.

== Track listing ==
- US Digital download
1. "Forever" (U.S. Radio Edit) - 3:40
2. "Forever" (Extended Mix) - 5:45
- UK Digital EP
1. "Forever" (UK Radio Edit) - 2:52
2. "Forever" (Extended Mix) - 5:45
3. "Forever" (16 Bit Remix) - 6:13
4. "Forever" (Kutz & Platonium Remix) - 4:15
5. "Forever" (Kutz & Platonium Dub) - 4:36
6. "Forever" (Tom Starr Remix) - 6:16
7. "Forever" (Hook 'N' Sling Remix) - 5:41
- Promotional CD single
1. "Forever" (UK Radio Edit) - 2:52
2. "Forever" (Extended Mix) - 5:45
3. "Forever" (Tom Starr Remix) - 6:16
4. "Forever" (Hook 'N' Sling Remix) - 5:41

== Chart positions ==
| Chart (2011) | Peak position |
|---|---|
| UK Dance Chart | 9 |
| UK Singles Chart | 43 |
