= 10 Ways to Steal Home Plate =

Studio album by Wolfgang Gartner
- Released: January 29, 2016
- Genre: Electro house
- Length: 33:02
- Label: Kindergarten Records
- Producer: Wolfgang Gartner

Wolfgang Gartner chronology
Weekend in America (2011)	10 Ways to Steal Home Plate (2016)

10 Ways to Steal Home Plate is the second studio album by American DJ and producer Wolfgang Gartner that was released on January 29, 2016.

== Track listing ==
No.	Title	Length
1.	"Turn Up (feat. Wiley & Trina)"	3:19
2.	"Looking For You (feat. Negin Djafari)"	2:45
3.	"Hurricane Slurricane (feat. Dâm-Funk & E-40)"	2:56
4.	"Saved"	2:46
5.	"Replay It (feat. D.A.)"	3:38
6.	"Unholy (feat. Bobby Saint)"	3:28
7.	"Y.W.M.O. (feat. Gene Noble)"	3:10
8.	"Faded (feat. Marc Griffin)"	3:51
9.	"Feel Right (feat. JHart)"	3:15
10.	"Up in Smoke (feat. A-Trak & Sirah)"	3:54

== Charts ==
Chart (2016)	Peak position
Billboard Top Dance/Electronic albums	16
