= Kaleidoscope (Tiësto album) =

Studio album by Tiësto
- Released: 6 October 2009
- Recorded: 2008–2009
- Studio: London, United Kingdom / Las Vegas, United States / Breda, Netherlands
- Genre: Progressive trance; electro house; progressive house
- Length: 73:51
- Label: Musical Freedom; PIAS; Ultra
- Producer: Tijs Verwest; D.J. Waakop Reijers-Fraaij; Stefan Engblom; Olle Cornéer; Danja; Frank E

Tiësto chronology
In Search of Sunrise 7: Asia (2008)	Kaleidoscope (2009)	Magikal Journey (2010)

Singles from Kaleidoscope
- 1. "I Will Be Here" Released: 28 July 2009; 2. "Escape Me" Released: 23 November 2009; 3. "Who Wants to Be Alone" Released: 5 March 2010; 4. "Feel It in My Bones" Released: 4 June 2010

Professional ratings
Review scores
Source	Rating
AllMusic	3.5/5 stars
AltSounds	80%
BBC	(Negative)
Pitchfork	3.8/10

Kaleidoscope is the fourth studio album by Dutch DJ and record producer Tiësto, released on 6 October 2009 by Musical Freedom, Tiësto's new label in association with PIAS Recordings. The album contains collaborations with Nelly Furtado, Emily Haines of Metric, Tegan and Sara, Jónsi of Sigur Rós, Kele Okereke of Bloc Party, and Calvin Harris among others.

The album also features the song "I Will Be Here" with Australian group Sneaky Sound System, which was released as the lead single on 28 July 2009. This album marks the change in Tiesto's style from trance towards more commercial house, dance and pop. The album entered the Dutch Albums Chart at number 2. It also debuted at number 20 on the UK Albums Chart and at number 5 on the Irish and Mexican Albums Chart.

== Track listing ==
No.	Title	Writer(s)	Producer(s)	Length
1.	"Kaleidoscope" (featuring Jónsi)	Tijs Verwest; D.J. Waakop Reijers-Fraaij; Jón Þór Birgisson	Verwest; Reijers-Fraaij	7:36
2.	"Escape Me" (featuring C.C. Sheffield)	Verwest; Reijers-Fraaij; C.C. Sheffield; Nico Chiotellis	Verwest; Reijers-Fraaij	4:17
3.	"You Are My Diamond" (featuring Kianna Alarid)	Verwest; Reijers-Fraaij; Kianna Alarid	Verwest; Reijers-Fraaij	4:10
4.	"I Will Be Here" (featuring Sneaky Sound System)	Verwest; Reijers-Fraaij; Angus McDonald; Connie Mitchell	Verwest; Reijers-Fraaij; Danja*	3:26
5.	"I Am Strong" (featuring Priscilla Ahn)	Verwest; Reijers-Fraaij; Priscilla Ahn	Verwest; Reijers-Fraaij	5:38
6.	"Here on Earth" (featuring Cary Brothers)	Verwest; Reijers-Fraaij; Cary Brothers	Verwest; Reijers-Fraaij	4:55
7.	"Always Near"	Verwest; Reijers-Fraaij	Verwest; Reijers-Fraaij	1:33
8.	"It's Not the Things You Say" (featuring Kele Okereke)	Verwest; Reijers-Fraaij; Kele Okereke	Verwest; Reijers-Fraaij	3:14
9.	"Fresh Fruit"	Verwest; Reijers-Fraaij	Verwest; Reijers-Fraaij	5:23
10.	"Century" (featuring Calvin Harris)	Verwest; Reijers-Fraaij; Calvin Harris	Verwest; Reijers-Fraaij; Harris; Stefan Engblom*; Olle Cornéer*	4:41
11.	"Feel It in My Bones" (featuring Tegan and Sara)	Verwest; Reijers-Fraaij; Tegan Quin; Sara Quin	Verwest; Reijers-Fraaij; Danja*	4:52
12.	"Who Wants to Be Alone" (featuring Nelly Furtado)	Verwest; Reijers-Fraaij; Nelly Furtado; Rick Nowels	Verwest; Reijers-Fraaij; Frank E*	4:35
13.	"LA Ride"	Verwest; Reijers-Fraaij	Verwest; Reijers-Fraaij	4:13
14.	"Bend It Like You Don't Care"	Verwest; Reijers-Fraaij; Engblom; Cornéer	Verwest; Reijers-Fraaij; Engblom; Cornéer	3:23
15.	"Knock You Out" (featuring Emily Haines)	Verwest; Reijers-Fraaij; Engblom; Cornéer; Emily Haines	Verwest; Reijers-Fraaij; Engblom; Cornéer	5:06
16.	"Louder Than Boom"	Verwest; Reijers-Fraaij; Engblom; Cornéer	Verwest; Reijers-Fraaij; Engblom; Cornéer	4:10
17.	"Surrounded by Light"	Verwest; Reijers-Fraaij	Verwest; Reijers-Fraaij	2:39

iTunes bonus tracks
No.	Title	Length
18.	"Organised Chaos"	5:12
19.	"Bad Behavior" (featuring Dizzee Rascal)	4:29

(*) Additional production

== Charts ==
Chart performance for Kaleidoscope
Chart (2009–2010)	Peak position
Australian Albums (ARIA)	31
Australian Dance Albums (ARIA)	7
Austrian Albums (Ö3 Austria)	49
Belgian Albums (Ultratop Flanders)	13
Belgian Albums (Ultratop Wallonia)	9
Canadian Albums (Billboard)	6
Czech Albums (ČNS IFPI)	44
Danish Albums (Hitlisten)	27
Dutch Albums (Album Top 100)	2
French Albums (SNEP)	139
German Albums (Offizielle Top 100)	61
Greek Albums (IFPI)	11
Hungarian Albums (MAHASZ)	25
Irish Albums (IRMA)	5
Italian Albums (FIMI)	72
Mexican Albums (Top 100 Mexico)	5
Norwegian Albums (VG-lista)	29
Polish Albums (ZPAV)	26
Scottish Albums (OCC)	8
Spanish Albums (PROMUSICAE)	87
Swiss Albums (Schweizer Hitparade)	73
UK Albums (OCC)	20
UK Dance Albums (OCC)	2
UK Independent Albums (OCC)	4
US Billboard 200	59
US Independent Albums (Billboard)	7
US Top Dance Albums (Billboard)	3

== Certifications ==
Certifications for Kaleidoscope
Region	Certification	Certified units/sales
Canada (Music Canada)	Gold	40,000^{^}
Mexico (AMPROFON)	Gold	30,000^{^}
^{^} Shipments figures based on certification alone.

== See also ==
- Kaleidoscope World Tour
- Kaleidoscope: Remixed
