= Weekend in America =

Studio album by Wolfgang Gartner
- Released: September 20, 2011
- Recorded: 2010–2011
- Genre: Electro house; hip house
- Length: 46:51
- Label: Ultra
- Producer: Joey Youngman

Wolfgang Gartner chronology
Weekend in America (2011)	10 Ways to Steal Home Plate (2016)

Weekend in America is the debut studio album released by American electro house artist Wolfgang Gartner, released on September 20, 2011, on Ultra Records. A departure from Gartner's previous releases of primarily DJ tracks, the album includes collaborations with several hip-hop artists, including Eve, Jim Jones, and Cam'ron. Although introducing this new facet of Gartner's music, Weekend in America features a mix of both pure DJ tracks and tracks with hip-hop influence. Singles from the album included "Illmerica", "Ménage à Trois", "Space Junk", "Forever" (featuring will.i.am), and "Still My Baby" (featuring Omarion).

== Critical reception ==
Professional ratings
Review scores
Source	Rating
About.com	4.5/5 stars
Sputnikmusic	3/5 stars

Ben Norman of About.com commended Gartner, saying he "decided to stick to what he knew, and thank goodness he did", noting the track "Forever" as "a superb example of what a good producer can achieve" and that "Illmerica" "showcases exactly what is so magical about this producer." Megan Rozell of Blogcritics stated that "within seconds of listening, any listener will become addicted and dance along. It is an absolutely successful first album from the already widely acclaimed producer/DJ."

Sputnikmusic critiqued Gartner for using "some outside help to complement his beats", writing that "even on the solo stuff you can't help but get the feeling that he may just be operating on auto-pilot, cruising along completely assured of his imminent success" and that album found itself "doing a rather excellent impression of being adequate; adequate, but by no means great" but that "Wolfgang still needs to be commended for producing a rather solid, if slightly tainted, house release that will see him reach a level of success that he does rightly deserve".

== Track listing ==
No.	Title	Length
1.	"Get 'em" (featuring Eve)	3:23
2.	"Space Junk"	3:29
3.	"Ménage à Trois"	5:08
4.	"Circus Freaks" (featuring Jim Jones and Cam'ron)	3:25
5.	"818"	4:11
6.	"Forever" (featuring will.i.am)	3:47
7.	"The Way It Was"	5:46
8.	"Shrunken Heads"	4:07
9.	"Still My Baby" (featuring Omarion)	3:38
10.	"Illmerica"	5:38
11.	"The Champ"	4:19

iTunes Store bonus tracks
No.	Title	Length
12.	"Welcome Back"	5:04
13.	"Cognitive Dissonance"	5:36
