= Club Life, Vol. 2 - Miami =

Compilation album by Tiësto
- Released: 21 April 2012
- Genres: Progressive house; electro house; big room house
- Length: 74:33
- Labels: Musical Freedom; PIAS
- Producers: Tiësto; Wolfgang Gartner; Third Party; Baggi Begovic; Sultan + Ned Shepard; Hardwell; John Dahlbäck; John De Sohn; Ivan Gough; Feenixpawl; Axwell; Avesta; Afrojack; Shermanology; Swanky Tunes; Moska

Tiësto chronology
Club Life, Vol. 1 - Las Vegas (2011)	Club Life, Vol. 2 - Miami (2012)	Club Life, Vol. 3 - Stockholm (2013)

Singles from Club Life, Vol. 2 - Miami
- 1. "Maximal Crazy" Released: 5 September 2011; 2. "What Can We Do (A Deeper Love)" Released: 27 December 2011; 3. "We Own the Night" Released: 6 April 2012

Club Life, Vol. 2 - Miami is the seventh mix compilation by Dutch disc jockey and music producer Tiësto, released on 21 April 2012. The second installment of the Club Life series, the album serves as a homage to the nightlife of Miami, Florida, a city renowned for being a focal point for electronic music. As well as collaborating with producers such as Axwell, Wolfgang Gartner, Afrojack, and Hardwell, Tiësto developed remixes of "Paradise" by Coldplay, Gotye's "Somebody That I Used to Know" and The Naked and Famous' "Young Blood".

Music critics reacted favorably to the album, who cited its bombastic approach and musical composition as highlights. Critics also felt that the album effectively reflected the dance culture in Miami. Club Life, Vol. 2 - Miami performed successfully in several countries including Canada, Russia, Switzerland and the United States, where it peaked at number sixteen on the Billboard 200.

== Background and development ==
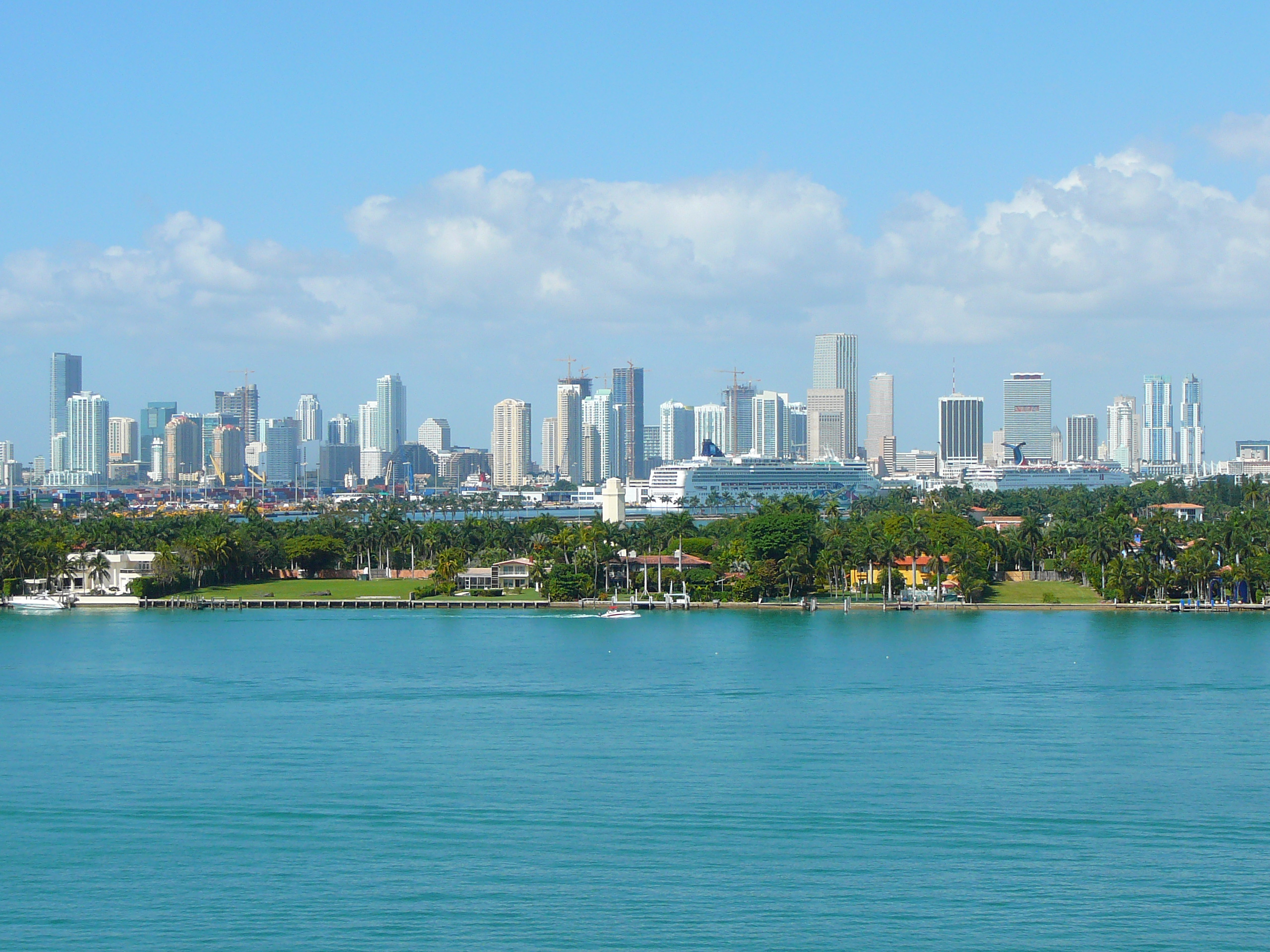
Tiësto was impressed with the nightlife of Miami, Florida (pictured) upon arriving in the United States.

Club Life, Vol. 2 - Miami is the second installment of the Club Life series, succeeding its predecessor Club Life, Vol. 1 - Las Vegas (2011). The album serves as a tribute to the nightlife in Miami, Florida, a city internationally renowned for being an epicenter for electronic dance music. Upon arriving in the United States in 2002, Tiësto was instantly enamored by the city's vibrant electronic music scene, as the genre had yet to garner mainstream popularity throughout the rest of the country. "Literally the first place I came to in America was Miami," he recalled, "and since then I've always been in love with the city. They've always been very supportive of my music. Like, even in the beginning of 2002, when the whole of America was not really into dance music, Miami had already embraced my music here and played it in all the stores." Tiësto, who performs in the area annually, sought inspiration from varying discothèques in the city. He explained, "I wanted to create songs that give fans the opportunity to experience the sound of Miami clubs, whether they’ve been there or not."

Tiësto collaborated with multiple record producers and disc jockeys in the recording process of the album, which include Afrojack, Wolfgang Gartner and Swanky Tunes. Club Life, Vol. 2 possess remixes of Coldplay's "Paradise" (2011), "Somebody That I Used to Know" (2011) by Gotye and The Naked and Famous' "Young Blood" (2011)—songs that Tiësto professes to be some of his favorites. "With the remixes on this album, I took a handful of songs I love and created remixes filtered through the Club Life sound", he explained.

== Composition ==
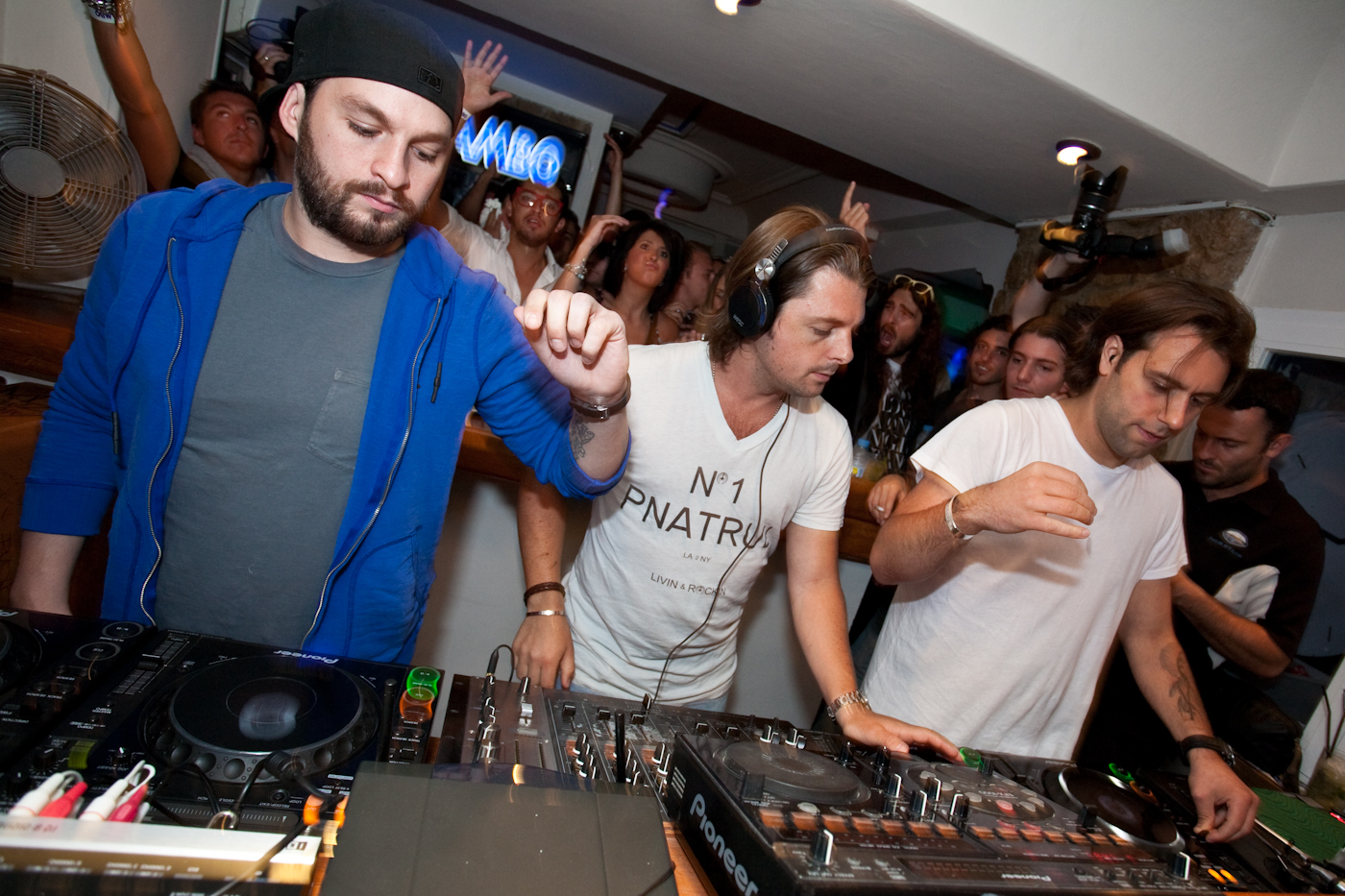
Swedish House Mafia member Axwell (center) created the "In My Mind" mix.

The album opens with the interlude "Miami" and "Chasing Summers", which are homages to the summers in the city. The collaborative effort We Own the Night follows as the third track; the song features vocals from English recording artist Luciana, which coincides over electronic basslines. After transitioning from "What Can We Do (A Deeper Love)" and "If a Lie Was Love", the respective seventh and eighth tracks—the remixes of "Paradise" and "Somebody That I Used to Know"—follows suit; the latter contains an upbeat melody with pounding synthesizers. It continues with "Walls", the album's ninth song, which contains an upbeat melody and a house-inspired breakdown. Hardwell's remix of "Young Blood" constitutes the tenth tune of Club Life, Vol. 2 - Miami, which albeit retains the original song's banger themes, provides a "euphoric sound with progressively sweet vocals building next to synths before releasing a thumping beat". The thirteenth track, "Arena", commences after "Life", "Long Time", and the "electric summer sound" of Axwell's "In My Mind". "Can't Stop Me", a collaborative work between Tiësto and fellow Dutch producer Afrojack, is drenched with thumping percussion and grandiose vocals. "Maximal Crazy" serves as the album's concluding number.

== Reception ==
Club Life, Vol. 2 - Two Miami has been well received by music critics. The album provoked Elektro Daily's Cynthia Conte to conclude that Tiësto "drops some serious fierce beats that will have you dancing all day and all night". Analogous sentiments were echoed by Sanam Wadhwani, who concluded: "Overall, Club Life, Vol. 2 - Miami is a perfect symphony of sound for all listeners of music and is a must buy." iEnlive commended the album's bombastic approach, and asserted that it accurately embodied Miami's electronic music scene. "As the time is finally here, the international DJ maestro presents his finest work as the album is a home to stellar productions, including collaborations with Wolfgang Gartner and unique remixes of Afrojack's latest hit 'Can’t Stop Me Now' as well as Gotye's 'Somebody I Used To Know'. It’s big, and it’s here." Writing for Brig, a publication from the University of Stirling, Stuart Kenny avouched that the album contained a plethora of potential hits "that will unleash excessive amounts of euphoria when blasted from a live stage".

Club Life, Vol. 2 - Miami performed successfully in several countries. It debuted at number sixteen on the Billboard 200, becoming Tiësto's highest-charting album in the United States. Subsequently, it charted at number three on the Independent Albums Chart and topped the Dance/Electronic Albums Chart. The following week, Club Life, Vol. 2 - Miami descended forty-eight spots to number sixty-four on the Billboard 200. In Canada, the remix album ascended and peaked at number seven on the Canadian Albums Chart. Club Life, Vol. 2 - Miami attained similar successes in European markets. It garnered its highest position in Switzerland, where it debuted within the top three. The album acquired top-ten positions in Austria, Russia, and the United Kingdom, while also obtaining top-100 entries in Spain and Denmark. "We Own The Night" peaked at No. 1 on the UK Club Charts.

== Track listing ==
No.	Title	Artist	Length
1.	"Miami" (Original Mix)	Tiësto	2:05
2.	"Chasing Summers" (Original Mix)	Tiësto	6:36
3.	"We Own the Night" (Original Mix)	Tiësto and Wolfgang Gartner featuring Luciana	5:32
4.	"What Can We Do (A Deeper Love)" (Third Party Remix)	Tiësto	6:25
5.	"If a Lie Was Love" (Baggi Begovic Knal Mix)	Josie Cotton	7:10
6.	"Somebody That I Used to Know" (Tiësto Remix)	Gotye featuring Kimbra	4:33
7.	"Paradise" (Tiësto Remix)	Coldplay	4:44
8.	"Walls" (Original Mix)	Sultan + Ned Shepard featuring Quilla	7:16
9.	"Young Blood" (Tiësto & Hardwell Remix)	The Naked & Famous	6:37
10.	"Life" (Original Mix)	John Dahlbäck	6:19
11.	"Long Time" (Original Mix)	John De Sohn featuring Andreas Moe	6:22
12.	"In My Mind" (Axwell Mix)	Ivan Gough and Feenixpawl featuring Georgi Kay	6:40
13.	"Arena" (Original Mix)	Avesta	7:23
14.	"Can't Stop Me" (Tiësto Remix)	Afrojack and Shermanology	5:19
15.	"Make Some Noise" (Original Mix)	Tiësto and Swanky Tunes featuring Ben McInerney of New Navy	7:20
16.	"Maximal Crazy" (Original Mix)	Tiësto	6:49

iTunes bonus track
No.	Title	Artist	Length
17.	"Las Vegas" (Moska Remix)	Tiësto	6:24

- In the iTunes Bonus Edition, "Miami" is a part of "Chasing Summers."
- The digital download of "Make Some Noise" has its own cover art but the song is not identified as a single.

== Charts ==
Chart (2012)	Peak position
Austrian Albums Chart	9
Canadian Albums Chart	7
Danish Albums Chart	21
Mexican Albums Chart	17
Russian Albums Chart	8
Spanish Albums Chart	93
Swiss Albums Chart	3
UK Compilation Chart	6
US Billboard 200	16
US Dance/Electronic Albums	1
US Independent Albums	3

=== Singles ===
"Chasing Summers"
Chart (2013)	Peak position
US Hot Dance/Electronic Songs (Billboard)	36

"We Own the Night"
Chart (2012)	Peak position
UK Dance (The Official Charts Company)	18
UK Singles (The Official Charts Company)	87
Poland (Polish Airplay New)	4
