= Swanky Tunes =

Russian musical duo

- Origin: Smolensk, Russia
- Genres: House; progressive house; electro house; future house; bass house; dubstep
- Years active: 1998–present
- Labels: Effective; Spinnin'; Showland; Ultra; Hexagon; Mixmash Records
- Members: Vadim Shpak; Dmitry Burykin
- Past members: Vadim Bagdasaryan; Stanislav Zaytsev
- Website: swankytunes.com

Swanky Tunes (stylized as SWΛNKУ TUИES) are a Russian electronic dance music duo composed of Vadim Shpak and Dmitry Burykin, formed in Smolensk in 1998. Prior to 2012, they have collaborated closely with another Russian EDM duo, Hard Rock Sofa. They were ranked number 97 of the DJ Mag charts in 2015.

The duo owns the label Showland, sub-label Armada Music (2015–2018), and has a weekly podcast of the same name.

== Biography ==
The group was formed in 1998, experimenting with different electronic styles in search of their own sound. At first, they mixed techno sounds with vintage synthesizers. Then the group morphed makes a sound clearly influenced by the big beat. Currently, some touches of techno, 80s electro, and progressive contemporary house complement their sound. At its inception, the band has a name in Russian, but in 1999 they decided to adapt to the English language, as it would be a more accessible name for the market.

Their debut album, Streamline, was released in 2006 by the Russian label Uplifto Records. In 2006 and 2007, they were named "Best Musical Group" for the Dance Music Awards in Russia.

Internationally, its productions and remixes have been released by labels from the likes of MixMash, Spinnin' Records, Refune, Size, Wall, Musical Freedom and Doorn Records. They also had the support from major artists of electronic music such as Tiësto, David Guetta, Sander Van Doorn, Swedish House Mafia, Laidback Luke, Dirty South and Avicii, among others.

Very often they releases productions in collaboration Hard Rock Sofa, another Russian musical duo, which one of its members, Alexander Shapovalov is a cousin of a member of Swanky Tunes, Vadim Shpak. In 2011, both groups released an electronic version of The Stooges song, "I Wanna Be Your Dog". In the same year, they collaborated with Dutch DJ R3hab on the song "Sending My Love" with the vocals of Max'C. In 2012, they collaborated with renowned DJ and producer Tiësto, production "Make Some Noise", including the record compiled by him, Club Life: Volume Two Miami. In September 2012, they founded their own record label Showland, which was distributed by the Dutch label Spinnin' Records, being its first release, the single "Blood Rush".

In November 2017, Swanky Tunes released their Get Swanky EP, including four tracks. According to the artists: "Get Swanky EP reveals Swanky Tunes as multi genre producers. It covers not just club music genres, but goes deeper into pop and dance music."

== Awards and nominations ==
Year	Award	Nominated work	Category	Result	Movement	ref.
2015	DJ Mag	Swanky Tunes	Top 100 DJs	No. 97	New Entry	
2016	DJ Mag	Swanky Tunes	Top 100 DJs	No. 27	▲70	
2017	DJ Mag	Swanky Tunes	Top 100 DJs	No. 99	▼72	
2018	DJ Mag	Swanky Tunes	Top 100 DJs	No. 71	▲28	

== Discography ==
=== Albums ===
Studio albums

- 2006: Streamline [Uplifto Records]

Compilations

- 2009: All About Us [TME]

=== Charting singles ===
Title	Year	Peak chart positions		Album
Title	Year	BEL (Fl) Dance	US Dance	Album
"Here We Go" (with Hard Rock Sofa)	2012	70	—	Non-album singles
"Sending My Love" (with R3hab featuring Max C)	2012	57	—	Non-album singles
"No One Knows Who We Are" (with Kaskade featuring Lights)	2013	―	34	Atmosphere
"Scratch"	2014	65	—	Non-album single
"—" denotes a recording that did not chart.

=== Singles ===
2010

- "Across the Light" [Mixmash Records]

2011

- "Oh Yeah/Skyquake" [Spinnin Records]
- "Together" (featuring Mr. V.I.) [Mixmash Records]
- "Their Law" [Spinnin Records]
- "Feedback" (with Hard Rock Sofa) [Spinnin Records]
- "XOXO" [Spinnin Records]
- "Smolengrad/United" (with Hard Rock Sofa) [SIZE Records]
- "I Wanna Be Your Dog" (with Hard Rock Sofa) [Doorn Records]

2012

- "Apogee" (with Hard Rock Sofa) [Spinnin]
- "The Edge" (with Hard Rock Sofa) [Wall Recordings]
- "Blood Rush" [Spinnin]
- "Chemistry" (with Hard Rock Sofa and Matisse & Sadko) [Spinnin]

2013

- "You Are Like Nobody Else" (with Peking Duk) (feturing James McNally) [Spinnin]
- "We Know" (with DVBBS and Eitro) [Spinnin]
- "Stop In My Mind" (with Hard Rock Sofa) [Spinnin]

2014

- "Jump, Shout, Make It Loud" [Spinnin]
- "Full House" [Spinnin]
- "Pump" [Spinnin]
- "Get Down" (with Vigel) [Doorn Records]
- "Fire In Our Hearts" (featuring C. Todd Nielsen) [Revealed]
- "Fix Me" featuring RAIGN [Altra Moda / Flamingo / Central Station / Effective]

2015

- "LOV3" [Armada]

2018

- "Drop It" [Spinnin' Premium]
- "Day By Day" (featuring LP) [Effective]
- "Rooftop Party" (with Dirtcaps) [Revealed]
- "In the Club" [Hexagon]
- "Collusion" (with Morgan Page) [Armada]
- "Диджей"^{[A]} (with Elena Temnikova) [Effective]

2019

- "Virus" [Protocol]
- "Supersonic" (featuring Christian Burns) [Spinnin']
- "U Got Me Burning" [Hysteria]
- "Take Me Away" [Hub]
- "Blow" [Hussle]
- "I'll Live On" (featuring Jantine) [Effective]
- "Sugar" (with George Fletcher) [Effective / Klever Label]
- "Game Time" (with Nssnd and LexBlaze) [Protocol]
- "Moonlight" (with Ya Rick) [Coffee House]
- "You Don't Know Me" [Future House]

2020

- "Over & Over" [Kontor]
- "The Illest" [Mixmash]
- "Offbeat" [Smash The House]
- "Own The Night" (with Jac & Harri) [Revealed]
- "Tired" [Sony Music]
- "Better Now" (with Teddy Cream) [Hussle]
- "Love Yourself" (with Going Deeper) [Musical Freedom]
- "No Problems" [Generation Hex]

2021

- "Your Love" [Hexagon]

2022

- "Style" [Revealed]
- "I Love The Way You Move" [Hysteria]

2023

- "Feed Your Soul" [Effective]
