= C'mon (Tiësto and Diplo song) =

2010 single by Tiësto, Diplo and Busta Rhymes

Single by Tiësto vs. Diplo

from the album Club Life, Vol. 1 - Las Vegas
- Released: 11 May 2010
- Recorded: 2010
- Genre: Trouse
- Length: 5:17 (original mix)
- Label: Musical Freedom; PIAS; Mad Decent; Wall of Sound
- Songwriter(s): Tijs Verwest; Thomas Pentz; Olle Cornéer; Stefan Engblom; Derek Allen; Paul Devro
- Producer(s): Tiësto; Diplo

Tiësto singles chronology
"Feel It in My Bones" (2010)	"C'mon" (2010)	"C'mon (Catch 'Em By Surprise)" (2011)

Diplo singles chronology
"U Don't Like Me" (2010)	"C'mon" (2010)	"C'mon (Catch 'Em By Surprise)" (2011)

"C'mon" is an instrumental track by Dutch DJ Tiësto and American DJ Diplo. It was released on 11 May 2010 in the Netherlands, the United Kingdom and the United States on iTunes. It is the first single from the Tiësto mixed compilation Club Life, Vol. 1 - Las Vegas.

== Music video ==
The music video premiered on Tiësto's official YouTube channel on 19 May 2010. The video was shot at Ultra Music Festival in 2010 and contains extracts of Tiësto and Diplo sets. It was directed by Alan Ferguson.

== Track listing ==
Digital download (MF029)

1. "C'mon" (Original Mix) – 5:17

12-inch (MAD118)

1. "C'mon" (Original Mix) – 5:17
2. "C'mon" (Totally Krossed Out Remix) – 5:52

Free digital download

1. "C'mon" (Maestro Harrell 2016 Remix) – 4:23

== "Catch 'Em by Surprise" version ==
"C'mon (Catch 'Em by Surprise)"

Single by Tiësto vs. Diplo featuring Busta Rhymes
- Released: 14 January 2011
- Recorded: 2010
- Genre: Trouse; hip house
- Length: 3:32 (radio edit)
- Label: Musical Freedom; PIAS; Mad Decent; Wall of Sound
- Songwriter(s): Tijs Verwest; Thomas Pentz; Olle Cornéer; Stefan Engblom; Derek Allen; Paul Devro; Trevor Smith
- Producer(s): Tiësto; Diplo

Tiësto singles chronology
"C'mon" (2010)	"C'mon (Catch 'Em by Surprise)" (2011)	"Zero 76" (2011)

Diplo singles chronology
"C'mon" (2010)	"C'Mon (Catch 'Em by Surprise)" (2011)	"Pick Your Poison" (2011)

Busta Rhymes singles chronology
"World Go Round" (2009)	"C'Mon (Catch 'Em by Surprise)" (2011)	"Look at Me Now" (2011)

"C'mon (Catch 'Em by Surprise)" is a song by Dutch DJ Tiësto and American DJ Diplo. It features vocals by American rapper Busta Rhymes. It was released on 14 January 2011 in the Netherlands, United Kingdom and Finland. The single was released in the United States on iTunes 24 January 2011.

"C'mon (Catch 'Em by Surprise)" is the vocal version of the 2010 single "C'mon". The song was meant to be the first single of an upcoming Tiësto album which was never released in favor of creating the Club Life compilation series..

=== Music video ===
The music video premiered on Tiësto's official YouTube Channel on 17 December 2010. It features Busta Rhymes who is rapping around rap dancers.

=== Track listings ===
Digital download (MF036)

1. "C'Mon (Catch 'Em by Surprise)" (Radio Edit) – 3:32

CD-Maxi (WOS089)

1. "C'mon (Catch 'Em by Surprise)" (Radio Edit) – 3:32
2. "C'mon (Catch 'Em by Surprise)" (Extended Club Mix) – 5:13
3. "C'mon (Catch 'Em by Surprise)" (Instrumental) – 3:32
4. "C'mon (Catch 'Em by Surprise)" (Acapella) – 3:29

=== Charts ===
Chart (2011)	Peak Position
Belgium (Ultratop 50 Flanders)	39
Belgium (Ultratop 50 Wallonia)	39
Canada (Canadian Hot 100)	68
CIS Airplay (TopHit)	140
Finland (Suomen virallinen lista)	19
Germany (GfK)	68
Ireland (IRMA)	21
Netherlands (Dutch Top 40)	5
Netherlands (Single Top 100)	8
Poland (Dance Top 50)	10
Slovakia (Rádio Top 100)	54
Switzerland (Schweizer Hitparade)	68
UK Dance (OCC)	1
UK Singles (OCC)	13

=== Year-end charts ===
Chart (2011)	Position
Netherlands (Dutch Top 40)	84
Netherlands (Single Top 100)	86
UK Singles (Official Charts Company)	114

=== Certifications ===
Certifications for "C'mon (Catch 'Em by Surprise)"
Region	Certification	Certified units/sales
United Kingdom (BPI)	Silver	200,000^{*}
^{*} Sales figures based on certification alone.
