= Escape Me =

Single by Tiësto featuring C. C. Sheffield

from the album Kaleidoscope
- Released: 23 November 2009
- Recorded: 2009
- Genre: Progressive trance; electro house; electronic rock
- Length: 4:17 (original mix); 3:32 (radio edit)
- Label: Musical Freedom; PIAS; Ultra
- Songwriter(s): Tijs Verwest; Dennis Waakop Reijers-Fraaij; Cydney Celeste Sheffield; Nico Chiotellis
- Producer(s): Tiësto

Tiësto singles chronology
"I Will Be Here" (2009)	"Escape Me" (2009)	"Who Wants to Be Alone" (2010)

C. C. Sheffield singles chronology
"Escape Me" (2009)	"Long Brown Hair" (2012)

"Escape Me" is a single recorded by Tiësto, featuring vocals from Cydney Celeste "C. C." Sheffield, an actress from Los Angeles who helped write the song with her rock band colleague Nico Chiotellis. Released on 23 November 2009, the song is the second single from Tiësto's album Kaleidoscope. Tiësto was the primary producer of the song, assisted by longtime collaborators DJ Waakop Reijers-Fraaij and Tijs Verwest.

The music video for "Escape Me" premiered on Tiësto's official YouTube channel on 12 October 2009.

== Formats and track listings ==
1. "Escape Me" (Original Mix) – 4:18
2. "Escape Me" (Alex Gaudino & Jason Rooney Remix) – 7:55
3. "Escape Me" (L.A. Riots Remix) – 6:50
4. "Escape Me" (Avicii's Remix At Night) – 7:48
5. "Escape Me" (Marcel Woods Remix) – 6:52

== Charts ==
Chart (2009–10)	Peak position
Netherlands (Single Top 100)	52
Poland (Dance Top 50)	9
