= Kaleidoscope World Tour =

2009–10 concert tour by Tiësto

- World tour by Tiësto
- Poster for the first stop on his tour in New York
- Associated album: Kaleidoscope
- Start date: September 24, 2009
- End date: March 8, 2011
- Legs: Total: 5 North America (Sept-Nov 2009); Latin America (Dec 2009-Jan 2010); Australia & Asia (Jan-Feb 2010); Europe (March–May 2010); Euro & US Festivals (Summer 2010)
- No. of shows: Total: 150

Tiësto concert chronology
- In Search of Sunrise: North American Summer Tour (2008); Kaleidoscope World Tour (2009–2011); Club Life Tour (2011)

The Kaleidoscope World Tour was a Tiësto tour in support of his album Kaleidoscope. The tour will include 150 dates, spanning 5 continents.

On October 31, 2009, for his Halloween show at Congress Theater in Chicago, Tiesto dressed as the hometown Chicago Bears NFL quarterback Jay Cutler for his entire four-and-a-half-hour set.

== Tour dates ==
Date	City	Country	Venue
North America
September 24, 2009	New York City	United States	Hammerstein Ballroom
September 25, 2009	New York City	United States	Hammerstein Ballroom
September 26, 2009	New York City	United States	Hammerstein Ballroom
October 1, 2009	Lowell	United States	Tsongas Center
October 2, 2009	Montreal	Canada	Bell Centre
October 3, 2009	Toronto	Canada	Arrow Hall
October 4, 2009	Halifax	Canada	Cunard Centre
October 10, 2009	Atlanta	United States	North Atlanta Trade Center
October 11, 2009	Washington, D.C.	United States	Fur Nightclub
October 12, 2009	Cleveland	United States	Aura
October 13, 2009	Columbus	United States	BoMA
October 14, 2009	Philadelphia	United States	Electric Factory
October 15, 2009	Charlotte	United States	The Forum
October 16, 2009	Orlando	United States	UCF Arena
October 17, 2009	Fort Lauderdale	United States	NSU Arena (early show)
October 17, 2009	Miami	United States	LIV
October 18, 2009	Tampa	United States	The Ritz
October 19, 2009	Naples	United States	Sway Lounge
October 23, 2009	Houston	United States	Reliant Arena
October 24, 2009	Dallas	United States	Palladium Ballroom
October 25, 2009	San Antonio	United States	Cowboys
October 26, 2009	Oklahoma City	United States	City Walk
October 27, 2009	Nashville	United States	Limelight
October 28, 2009	St. Louis	United States	HOME
October 29, 2009	Kansas City	United States	Uptown Theater
October 30, 2009	Minneapolis	United States	Epic
October 31, 2009	Chicago	United States	Congress Theater
November 1, 2009	Milwaukee	United States	The Rave
November 7, 2009	El Paso	United States	Cohen Stadium
November 8, 2009	San Diego	United States	4th & B
November 9, 2009	Denver	United States	Beta
November 10, 2009	Edmonton	Canada	Shaw Conference Centre
November 11, 2009	Winnipeg	Canada	Duckworth Center
November 12, 2009	Calgary	Canada	Big Four Building
November 13, 2009	Calgary	Canada	Big Four Building
November 14, 2009	Vancouver	Canada	Pacific Coliseum
November 20, 2009	Magna, Utah	United States	The Saltair
November 21, 2009	San Francisco	United States	Cow Palace
November 22, 2009	Tempe	United States	Marquee Theater
November 25, 2009	Los Angeles	United States	The Shrine
November 27, 2009	Los Angeles	United States	The Shrine
November 28, 2009	Los Angeles	United States	The Shrine
December 31, 2009	Las Vegas	United States	Haze
March 26, 2010	Miami	United States	Bicentennial Park
March 27, 2010	Atlantic City	United States	Borgata
March 28, 2010	Montreal	Canada	Time Supper Club
April 2, 2010	South Padre Island	United States	Schlitterbahn Waterpark
April 3, 2010	Las Vegas	United States	Haze
April 8, 2010	Las Vegas	United States	Liquid Pool
April 9, 2010	Portland	United States	Roseland Theatre
April 10, 2010	Seattle	United States	WaMu Theatre
April 11, 2010	San Francisco	United States	Ruby Skye
April 17, 2010	Indio	United States	Empire Polo Fields
April 23, 2010	Austin	United States	Austin Music Hall
April 24, 2010	Miami	United States	LIV
July 16, 2010	Asbury Park	United States	Asbury Park Convention Hall
July 17, 2010	Asbury Park	United States	Asbury Park Convention Hall
July 18, 2010	Pointe-Calumet	Canada	Beach Club
Latin America
July 15, 2010	Mayagüez	Puerto Rico	Cervecera de Puerto Rico
December 4, 2009	Bogotá	Colombia	Parque Jaime Duque
December 5, 2009	Medellín	Colombia	Estadio de Itagüí
December 7, 2009	Cali	Colombia	Centro de Eventos
December 8, 2009	San José	Costa Rica	Torre Geko
December 9, 2009	Panama City	Panama	Figali Convention Center, Causeway de Amador
December 11, 2009	Porto Alegre	Brazil	Save Club
December 12, 2009	São Paulo	Brazil	Helvetia Festival
December 13, 2009	Brasília	Brazil	Centro de Convencoes Ulysees Guinares
December 16, 2009	La Paz	Bolivia	Estadio Mariscal Braun
December 17, 2009	Asunción	Paraguay	Brahma Beats (Ex Cerveceria Del Centro)
December 18, 2009	Santiago	Chile	Espacio Riesco
December 19, 2009	Buenos Aires	Argentina	Estadio Multipropósito Parque Roca
December 26, 2009	Oranjestad	Aruba	Havana Beach
January 15, 2010	Belo Horizonte	Brazil	Mix Garden
January 16, 2010	Rio de Janeiro	Brazil	Rio Centro
January 19, 2010	Chihuahua	Mexico	Centro de Convenciones
January 20, 2010	Monterrey	Mexico	Autocinema Las Torres Monterrey
January 21, 2010	León	Mexico	Centro de Espectaculos Sheriff
January 22, 2010	Mexico City	Mexico	Infield Hipodromo de las Americas
January 23, 2010	Guadalajara	Mexico	Foro Alterno
March 30, 2010	Tulum	Mexico	Tulum Beach
March 31, 2010	Morelia	Mexico	Plaza de Toros Monumental
April 1, 2010	Puerto Vallarta	Mexico	Playa Flamingos
Australia
January 29, 2010	Sydney	Australia	Hordern Pavilion
January 30, 2010	Sydney	Australia	Hordern Pavilion
January 31, 2010	Brisbane	Australia	Riverstage
February 5, 2010	Melbourne	Australia	Hisense Arena
February 6, 2010	Melbourne	Australia	Hisense Arena
February 7, 2010	Melbourne	Australia	Hisense Arena
February 10, 2010	Perth	Australia	Metro City
February 11, 2010	Perth	Australia	Metro City
February 12, 2010	Perth	Australia	Metro City
Asia
February 13, 2010	Jakarta	Indonesia	Pantai Carnaval
February 19, 2010	Bangkok	Thailand	Central World
February 20, 2010	Pattaya	Thailand	Pattaya Dragon
Europe I
March 5, 2010	Sheffield	England	Sheffield Arena
March 6, 2010	Edinburgh	Scotland	Royal Highland Centre
March 11, 2010	London	England	O2 Academy Brixton
March 12, 2010	Cardiff	Wales	Cardiff International Arena
March 13, 2010	Liverpool	England	Liverpool Echo Arena
March 19, 2010	Dublin	Ireland	The O2
March 20, 2010	Birmingham	England	LG Arena
April 28, 2010	Copenhagen	Denmark	Café A Porta
April 30, 2010	Amsterdam	Netherlands	Museumplein
May 1, 2010	Antwerp	Belgium	Sportpaleis
May 8, 2010	Stavanger	Norway	Kongeparken
Africa
May 15, 2010	Johannesburg	South Africa	Sky Raiders
Europe II
May 21, 2010	Montreux	Switzerland	Music & Convention Center
May 22, 2010	Budapest	Hungary	Hungexpo G Csarnok
May 23, 2010	Bangor	Wales	Radio One
May 29, 2010	Copenhagen	Denmark	Parken Stadium
June 1, 2010	Rome	Italy	Palazzo dei Congressi
June 2, 2010	Wuppertal	Germany	Butan
June 3, 2010	Chişinău	Moldova	Moldexpo
June 4, 2010	Bratislava	Slovakia	Incheba, Expo Arena Bratislava
June 5, 2010	Maastricht	Netherlands	Maastricht Live
June 7, 2010	Ibiza	Spain	Privilege
June 11, 2010	Madrid	Spain	Rock in Rio
June 12, 2010	Belfast	Northern Ireland	Kings Hall
June 14, 2010	Ibiza	Spain	Privilege
June 19, 2010	Amsterdam	Netherlands	Heineken Music Hall
June 21, 2010	Ibiza	Spain	Privilege
June 23, 2010	Turin	Italy	Beat Music Festival
June 24, 2010	Kharkiv	Ukraine	Radmir Expo Hall
June 25, 2010	Odesa	Ukraine	Airfield Hydroport
June 26, 2010	Lviv	Ukraine	Lemberg Hippodrome
June 27, 2010	Kyiv	Ukraine	International Exhibition Center
June 28, 2010	Ibiza	Spain	Privilege
June 30, 2010	Limassol	Cyprus	Dolce Club
Middle East I
July 1, 2010	Amman	Jordan	Amman Exhibition Park
July 2, 2010	Eilat	Israel	Hahava
July 3, 2010	Beirut	Lebanon	Beirut International Exhibition & Leisure Center
Europe III
July 5, 2010	Ibiza	Spain	Privilege
July 10, 2010	Gdańsk	Poland	Plac Zebran Ludowych
July 12, 2010	Ibiza	Spain	Privilege
July 19, 2010	Ibiza	Spain	Privilege
July 23, 2010	St. Pölten	Austria	Beatpatrol Festival 2010
July 24, 2010	Porto	Portugal	Nova Era Beach Party 2010
July 25, 2010	Salou	Spain	Pacha
July 26, 2010	Ibiza	Spain	Privilege
July 30, 2010	London	England	Victoria Park
July 31, 2010	Berlin	Germany	Internationales Congress Centrum
August 1, 2010	Lloret de Mar	Spain	Discoteca Colossos
August 2, 2010	Ibiza	Spain	Privilege
Middle East II
August 5, 2010	North Coast	Egypt	La Jolie Plage
Europe IV
August 6, 2010	Navodari	Romania	Hanul Piratilor Beach
August 7, 2010	Nice	France	Stade Charles Ehrmann
August 8, 2010	Salou	Spain	Pacha
August 9, 2010	Ibiza	Spain	Privilege
August 12, 2010	Barcelona	Spain	Oshum
August 13, 2010	Irún	Spain	Ficoba
August 14, 2010	Zürich	Switzerland	Hallenstadion
August 15, 2010	Riccione	Italy	Cocoricò
August 16, 2010	Ibiza	Spain	Privilege
August 18, 2010	Zrće	Croatia	Papaya
August 19, 2010	Riga	Latvia	Essential Club
August 20, 2010	Kazan	Russia	TatNeftArena
August 21, 2010	Moscow	Russia	MTV Open Air – Red Square
August 22, 2010	Helsinki	Finland	The Circus
August 23, 2010	Ibiza	Spain	Privilege
August 28, 2010	Amsterdam	Netherlands	Mysteryland
August 29, 2010	Daresbury	England	Creamfields
August 30, 2010	Ibiza	Spain	Privilege
August 31, 2010	Prešov	Slovakia	Mestská Športová Hala
September 1, 2010	Skopje	Macedonia	Metropolis Arena
September 6, 2010	Ibiza	Spain	Privilege
September 9, 2010	Krasnodar	Russia	Galaxy Field
September 10, 2010	Ekaterinburg	Russia	Tele-club
September 11, 2010	Saint Petersburg	Russia	Krestovsky Island
September 12, 2010	Nizhny Novgorod	Russia	Stadium Trud
September 13, 2010	Ibiza	Spain	Privilege
September 17, 2010	Stockholm	Sweden	Annexet
September 18, 2010	Bergen	Norway	Vestlandshallen
September 20, 2010	Ibiza	Spain	Privilege
September 24, 2010	Marche-en-Famenne	Belgium	WEX
September 25, 2010	Glasgow	Scotland	Braehead Arena
September 27, 2010	Ibiza	Spain	Privilege
Middle East III
September 30, 2010	Doha	Qatar	Intercontinental Hotel
October 1, 2010	Abu Dhabi	United Arab Emirates	ADNEC
Europe V
October 2, 2010	Athens	Greece	Faliro Sports Pavilion Arena
Latin America II
October 9, 2010	Campo Grande	Brazil	Move Music Festival
October 10, 2010	Florianópolis	Brazil	Music Stage Park
October 11, 2010	São Paulo	Brazil	Madea
North America II
October 16, 2010	Washington, D.C.	United States	Glow at Fur
Latin America III
November 12, 2010	Santo Domingo	Dominican Republic	Old Herrera Airport
March 8, 2011	Managua	Nicaragua	Galerias Santo Domingo
North America III
November 19, 2010	Orlando	United States	UCF Arena
Asia II
December 8, 2010	Bangkok	Thailand	808 Bangkok
December 10, 2010	Taipei	Taiwan	Nankang 101
December 11, 2010	Singapore	Singapore	ZoukOut

== See also ==
- Kaleidoscope
