= From Here to Anywhere =

Studio album by Sneaky Sound System
- Released: 7 October 2011
- Genre: Electropop; dance; house
- Length: 42:39
- Label: Modular
- Producer: Black Angus

Sneaky Sound System studio album chronology
2 (2008)	From Here to Anywhere (2011)

Singles from From Here to Anywhere
- 1. "We Love" Released: 27 May 2011; 2. "Big" Released: 19 August 2011; 3. "Really Want to See You Again" Released: 9 March 2012; 4. "Friends" Released: 20 July 2012

From Here to Anywhere is the third studio album by Australian music collective Sneaky Sound System, released 7 October 2011. It was nominated at the 2012 ARIA Music Awards for Best Dance Release, but lost to Ivan Gough & Feenixpawl, featuring Georgi Kay, for In My Mind.

== Information ==
The album's first single "We Love" premiered on 27 May 2011. The duo enlisted studio guru Serban Ghenea to mix the album and it is the first album released under the group's new record label Modular Recordings. It was released 7 October in Australia and New Zealand and 17 October in the United Kingdom and the United States. The second single from the album, "Big", premiered on Modular Records' website on 18 August 2011. The full stream was posted onto their Facebook page, and the cover art was released in conjunction with the post. The album's third single "Really Want to See You Again" was released to radio airplay on 13 December 2011. The single failed to chart, however, it reached No. 11 on the Club Chart. "Friends" was released as the fourth single on 20 July 2012 digitally.

== Track listing ==
All tracks are written by Angus McDonald and Connie Mitchell, except where noted.

From Here to Anywhere – Standard edition
No.	Title	Length
1.	"Friends"	4:38
2.	"We Love"	2:52
3.	"Big"	4:26
4.	"Really Want to See You Again"	4:05
5.	"Remember"	4:20
6.	"The Colours"	4:43
7.	"I Need You So"	5:30
8.	"1984"	4:11
9.	"I'm Not Leaving"	3:58
10.	"Lovetown"	4:02
Total length:		42:39

From Here to Anywhere – iTunes Store bonus track
No.	Title	Writer(s)	Length
11.	"Rough"	McDonald; Mitchell; Donnie Sloan	3:07
Total length:			45:46

From Here to Anywhere – United Kingdom iTunes LP deluxe edition
No.	Title	Length
12.	"Animals"	3:47
13.	"We Love" (Pleasurekraft Remix)	5:39
14.	"We Love" (Bart B More Remix)	6:49
15.	"Big" (John Dahlbäck Remix)	5:45
16.	"Always by Your Side" ("Big" Nicolas Jaar Remix)	5:06

== Personnel ==
Visuals and imagery

- Mat Maitland – sleeve art, design
- Ben Sullivan – band photography

Technical and production

- Black Angus – production
- Nicholas Routledge – co-production
- Michael Di Francesco – co-production
- Serban Ghenea – mixing
- Mike Marsh – mastering

== Charts ==
In Australia, the album debuted at No. 11 on the ARIA Albums Chart and #6 on the ARIA Digital Albums Chart.

Chart (2011)	Peak position
Australian Albums (ARIA)	11

== Release history ==
Region	Date	Label	Format	Catalogue
Australia	7 October 2011	Modular	CD; digital download	MODCD145
United Kingdom	17 October 2011	Modular	CD; digital download	MODCD145
United Kingdom	17 October 2011	Modular	Vinyl	MODVL149
United States	25 October 2011	Modular	CD; digital download	
