= Feel It in My Bones =

Single by Tiësto featuring Tegan and Sara

from the album Kaleidoscope
- Released: 4 June 2010
- Recorded: 2009
- Genre: Progressive trance; electro house; dance-pop
- Length: 4:52
- Label: Musical Freedom; PIAS; Ultra
- Songwriter(s): Tijs Verwest; D.J. Waakop Reijers-Fraaij; Tegan Quin; Sara Quin
- Producer(s): Tijs Verwest; D.J. Waakop Reijers-Fraaij; Danja

Tiësto singles chronology
"Who Wants to Be Alone" (2010)	"Feel It in My Bones" (2010)	"C'mon" (2010)

Tegan and Sara singles chronology
"Alligator" (2009)	"Feel It in My Bones" (2010)	"Closer" (2012)

"Feel It in My Bones" is a song recorded by Dutch DJ and record producer Tiësto, featuring Canadian band Tegan and Sara. It was released as the third single from Tiësto's fourth studio album, Kaleidoscope, on 7 September 2009. It was given a full single release on 4 June 2010.

The song came about after the twins received a number of tracks from Tiësto and they "honed in on something that we liked".

They have called it their first true collaboration, with Tegan saying that "it was a true collaboration; there's like two sections that Sara wrote, and three that I wrote."

The music video for "Feel It in My Bones" premiered on Tiësto's official YouTube channel on 13 January 2010.

== Track listing ==
- Digital download (1)
1. "Feel It in My Bones" – 4:52
- Digital download (2)
1. "Feel It in My Bones" (Radio Edit) – 3:25
2. "Feel It in My Bones" (Marcus Schössow Remix) – 7:05
3. "Feel It in My Bones" (Paul Miller & Sasha Dubrovsky vs. Suncatcher Remix) – 8:07
4. "Feel It in My Bones" (Paul Webster Remix) – 8:20
5. "Feel It in My Bones" (Album Version) – 4:52

== Charts ==
=== Weekly charts ===
Chart (2009–10)	Peak position
Canada (Canadian Hot 100)	29
Canada CHR/Top 40 (Billboard)	12
Canada Hot AC (Billboard)	26
US Dance/Electronic Digital Songs (Billboard)	45
US Dance/Mix Show Airplay (Billboard)	19

=== Year-end charts ===
Chart (2010)	Position
Canada (Canadian Hot 100)	94

== Certifications ==
Region	Certification	Certified units/sales
Canada (Music Canada)	Platinum	80,000^{*}
^{*} Sales figures based on certification alone.
