= Who Wants to Be Alone =

Single by Tiësto featuring Nelly Furtado

from the album Kaleidoscope
- Released: 21 March 2010
- Recorded: 2009
- Genre: Progressive house; progressive trance
- Length: 4:35 (Album Version); 3:35 (Radio Edit)
- Label: Musical Freedom; PIAS; Ultra
- Songwriter(s): Tijs Verwest; Dennis Waakop Reijers-Fraaij; Nelly Furtado; Rick Nowels
- Producer(s): Tiësto; DJ Waakop Reijers; DJ Frank E

Tiësto singles chronology
"Feel It" (2009)	"Who Wants to Be Alone" (2010)	"Feel It in My Bones" (2010)

Nelly Furtado singles chronology
"Morning After Dark" (2009)	"Who Wants to Be Alone" (2010)	"Bajo Otra Luz" (2010)

"Who Wants to Be Alone" is a song by Dutch DJ and record producer Tiësto, featuring Canadian singer Nelly Furtado. The track was released as the third single from Tiësto's fourth studio album, Kaleidoscope, on 21 March 2010.

== Charts ==
=== Weekly charts ===
Chart (2010)	Peak Position
Belgium (Ultratop 50 Flanders)	39
Czech Republic (Rádio – Top 100)	12
Denmark (Tracklisten)	20
Hungary (Dance Top 40)	10
Netherlands (Dutch Top 40)	17
Netherlands (Single Top 100)	34
Poland (Polish Airplay Top 100)	1
Poland (Dance Top 50)	5
Russia (Top Hit Weekly Audience Choice)	78
Slovakia (Rádio Top 100)	8
UK Singles (Official Charts Company)	91
UK Dance (OCC)	10

=== Year-end charts ===
Chart (2010)	Position
Hungary (Dance Top 40)	44
Netherlands (Dutch Top 40)	97
