= Wolfgang Gartner =

American DJ and record producer (born 1982)

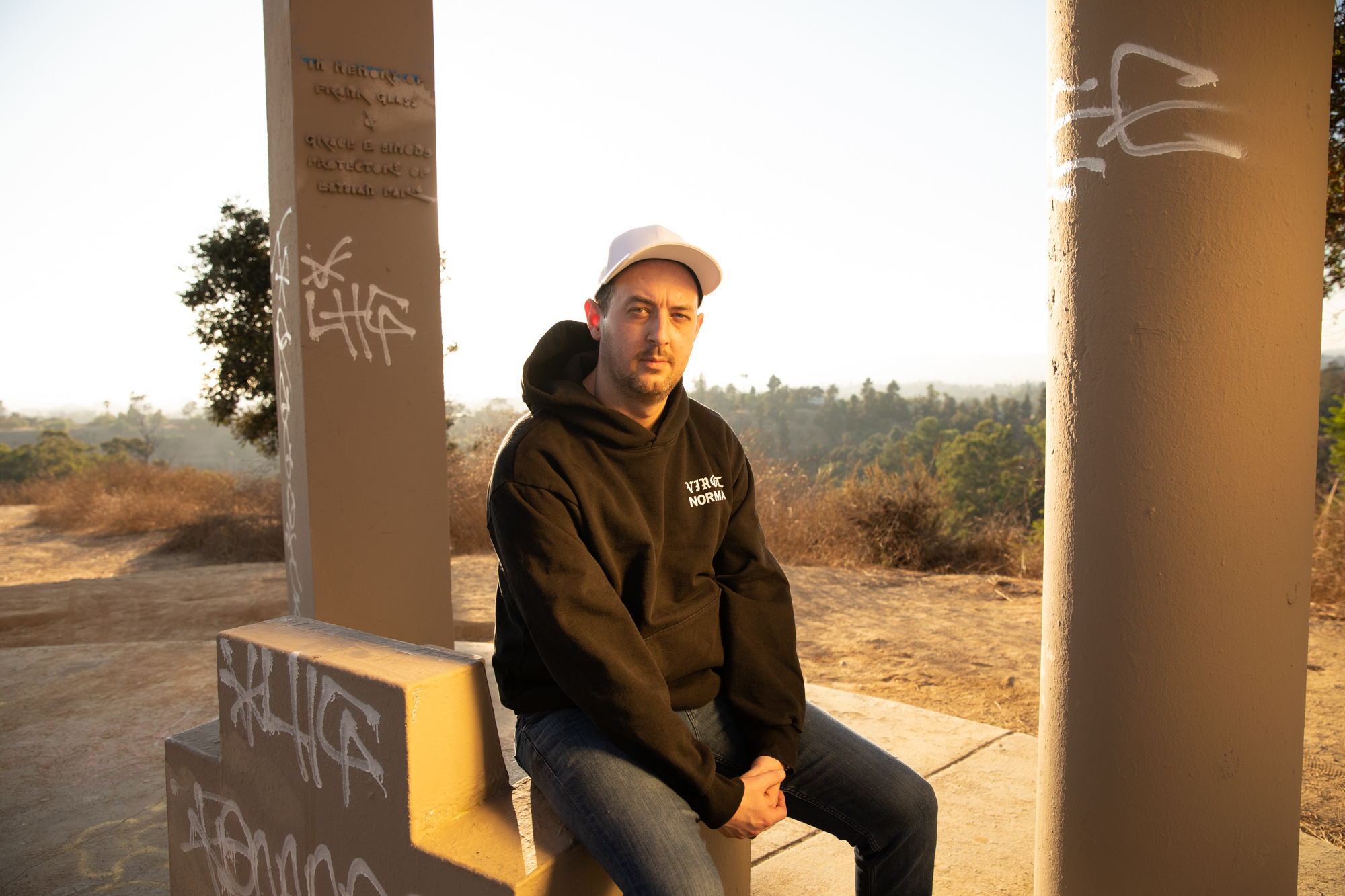
- Wolfgang Gartner in 2021

Background information
- Birth name: Joseph Thomas Youngman
- Also known as: Mario Fabriani; Joey Youngman
- Born: March 17, 1982 (age 43); San Luis Obispo, California, U.S.
- Genres: House; electro house; progressive house; complextro
- Occupation(s): Record producer, DJ
- Labels: Ultra; Ministry Of Sound UK; Om; Kindergarten; Monstercat; Spinnin; Armada; Mau5trap; PRMD

Joseph Thomas Youngman (born March 17, 1982), better known by his stage name Wolfgang Gartner, is an American DJ and music producer. Much of his music prior to 2010 was released through his own record label, Kindergarten, but he signed with Ultra Records in 2010 and Ministry of Sound in the UK in 2011.

== Biography ==
=== Background ===
Youngman created the Wolfgang Gartner name in late 1999 after establishing a successful name as a deep house DJ. Not wanting to be criticized for such an abrupt departure in style, Youngman created the name anonymously. Gartner's identity was revealed officially in July 2008. Youngman took the name from the coach of the Cal Poly Mustangs men's soccer team. The current Wolfgang Gartner logo was created in 2010 by New York graffiti artist Eric Haze who created logos for the Beastie Boys, Public Enemy and EPMD.

Gartner hosted the first episode of MTV's dance music show "Clubland" which aired on September 22, 2011. A portion of the episode was filmed at his home in Los Angeles, California, where he gave a tour of his studio and introduced music videos. He also was the DJ for the 10th Video Game Awards, which aired on Spike TV on December 7, 2012.

=== Music ===
A total of eight of Gartner's songs have held the #1 position on the Beatport Top 10 Chart. His single "Wolfgang's 5th Symphony" was the highest selling song on Beatport.com in 2009. Gartner received a Grammy nomination for his remix of Andy Caldwell's "Funk Nasty" in the Best Remixed Recording (Non Classical) Category in 2010.

On September 20, 2011, Gartner released his first full-length album Weekend in America. The album featured vocal cameos from Omarion, Jim Jones & Cam'ron, will.i.am and Eve. It peaked at #2 in iTunes' dance chart and #1 in Beatport's album chart. Gartner also collaborated with deadmau5 on "Animal Rights", "Channel 42" and "Channel 43", with Skrillex on "The Devil's Den", and with Tiesto and Luciana on "We Own the Night".

Gartner's music has been featured in a number of video games, including the racing game Midnight Club: Los Angeles ("Squares" and "Montezuma"), snowboarding game Stoked ("Circles"), and as downloadable content for Activision's DJ Hero and Hi-Fi Rush ("Wolfgang's 5th Symphony"), Dirt Showdown ("Illmerica"), Forza Horizon ("Illmerica"), Forza Horizon 4 ("Ching Ching"), FIFA 20 (”Anaconda“) and in The Crew Motorfest ("Cosa Nostra"). His music has also been featured in the TV shows Teen Wolf ("Illmerica") and The Secret Circle ("Get Em"), Grey's Anatomy ("There and Back"), How I Met Your Mother ("Menage A Trois"), Arrow ("There and Back") and in the movie Limitless ("Hook Shot").

"Illmerica" was mashed up with "We Are Your Friends" (by Justice vs Simian) to form the track "Illmerica Are Your Friends" by Australian DJ Steve Camp; the song became popular after it was played as the opening track on episode 186 of Tiësto's radio show Club Life in 2010.

Gartner was nominated for four International Dance Music Awards in January 2011, including Best Electro/Tech House Track, Best Progressive Track, Best Breakthrough DJ and Best Breakthrough Artist. That same month, Gartner announced a new video for the single "Illmerica". "Forever", a collaboration with will.i.am, was released on April 12, 2011. The music video received regular rotation on MTV UK, MuchMusic (Canada), and AMtv in the USA. The single received limited radio airplay in America, while reaching A-List rotation on BBC Radio 1 in the UK.

His musical style ranges from electro house to progressive house and tech house, as categorized in online record stores such as Beatport.

Gartner finished in 8th place in the 2013 America's Best DJ competition—a vote and promotion to find out the country's most popular DJ conducted by DJ Times magazine and Pioneer DJ.

=== DJ career ===
Gartner has performed at a number of music festivals including CounterPoint 2014, Camp Bisco 2011 and 2013, Neon Desert Music Festival 2013 World Electronic Music Festival 2012, Electric Forest 2012, Sasquatch! Music Festival 2012, Coachella 2010, 2013 Electric Daisy Carnival 2010, 2011, and 2013, Ultra Music Festival 2010 through 2013, Parklife (Australia) 2011, Creamfields (UK) 2011, Global Dance Festival 2012, Electric Zoo 2011, 2012 and tours extensively around the world. In 2010, Gartner debuted as a featured guest on BBC Radio 1's Essential Mix series, hosted by DJ/producer Pete Tong.

== Discography ==
Studio albums

- Weekend in America (2011)
- 10 Ways to Steal Home Plate (2016)
