= I Will Be Here =

Single by Tiësto and Sneaky Sound System

from the album Kaleidoscope
- Released: 28 July 2009
- Recorded: 2009
- Genre: Progressive trance; electro house
- Length: 3:50 (radio edit); 3:25 (album version)
- Label: Ultra; 14th Floor
- Songwriters: Tijs Verwest; Dennis Waakop Reijers-Fraaij; Angus McDonald; Connie Mitchell
- Producers: Tiësto; DJ Waakop Reijers; Danja

Tiësto singles chronology
"Ride" (2008)	"I Will Be Here" (2009)	"Escape Me" (2009)

Sneaky Sound System singles chronology
"It's Not My Problem" (2009)	"I Will Be Here" (2009)	"We Love" (2011)

Music video
- "I Will Be Here" on YouTube

"I Will Be Here" is a song recorded by Tiësto and Sneaky Sound System with vocals from Sneaky Sound System's Connie Mitchell. Released on 28 July 2009, the song is the first single off the album Kaleidoscope.

== Music video ==
The music video for "I Will Be Here" premiered on Tiësto's Myspace on 7 August 2009. Tiësto teamed up with acclaimed Japanese director Masashi Muto and dancer Mori Koichiro to create the music video for "I Will Be Here", a collaboration with Sneaky Sound System. It begins with a man working on a single computer in a lab, while the screens begin to display Tiësto and Sneaky Sound System logos. He puts on a single speaker "backpack," hooked up to a "Tiësto" cassette player, and presses play. As the music starts, he begins to walk in a robotic fashion, as the computer screens all flicker and switch to the same logos as he leaves the lab. All the lights around him begin to pulsate he walks by, synchronized with the music, while the blue stripes on his white spacesuit outfit also show different light animations. Exiting through a parking deck, he eventually makes his way through Shibuya, Tokyo, and does one final dance in the middle of the famous intersection in front of the Hachiko exit at Shibuya Station, before going to the top of a building, where he "powers down" as the music ends.

== Chart performance ==
In the United States, the single became their first number one single for both acts on Billboard's Dance/Mix Show Airplay chart, where it reached that peak in its 21 November 2009 issue. The song also peaked at number 44 in the United Kingdom and number 33 in the Netherlands.

== Track listing ==
Digital download
No.	Title	Length
1.	"I Will Be Here" (Album Version)	3:25
2.	"I Will Be Here" (Radio Edit)	3:50
3.	"I Will Be Here" (Wolfgang Gartner Remix)	8:13

== Charts ==
Chart performance for "I Will Be Here"
Chart (2009–2010)	Peak position
Australia (ARIA)	59
Netherlands (Single Top 100)	33
Poland Dance (ZPAV)	6
UK Singles (Official Charts)	44
US Dance Airplay (Billboard)	1

Chart performance for "I Will Be Here" (Wolfgang Gartner Remix)
Chart (2009–2026)	Peak position
CIS Airplay (TopHit)	79
Russia Airplay (TopHit)	75
Russia Streaming (TopHit)	99
