= Kisschasy discography =

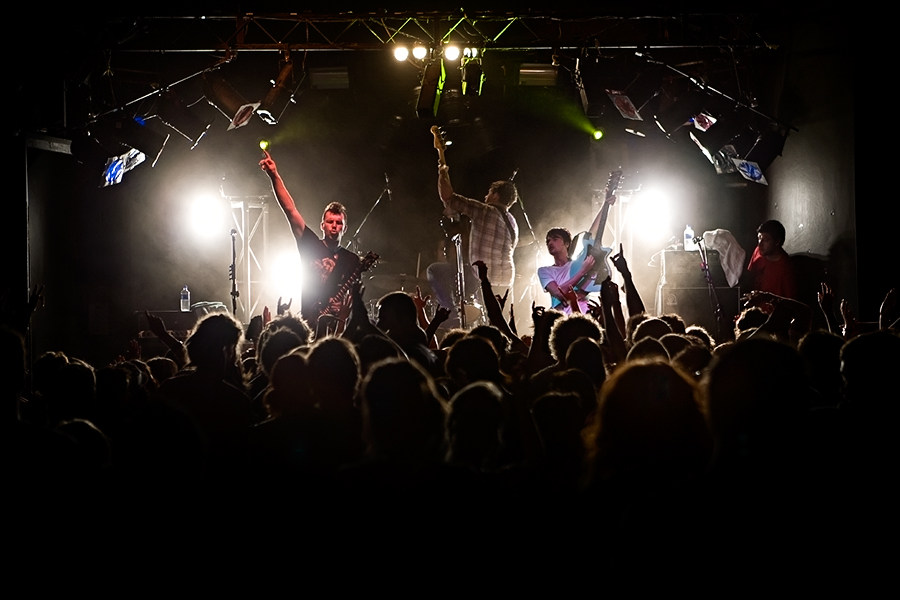
- Kisschasy performing at Great Northern Hotel in Byron Bay, New South Wales on 14 November 2007
- Studio albums: 4
- Extended plays: 3
- Compilation albums: 2
- Singles: 15
- Video albums: 1

The discography of Kisschasy, an Australian rock band from Melbourne formed in 2002, consists of four studio albums, two compilation albums, three extended plays, one video album and fifteen singles.

After forming in 2002, Kisschasy released their two first EPs in 2004, followed by a compilation of the two which was released in Japan, Fire in the Breeze. Their debut album was released in 2005, titled United Paper People. It peaked at number 15 on the ARIA Albums Chart and featured three singles which entered the top 50 of the ARIA Singles Chart. The album was certified gold by ARIA. In 2006, Kisschasy released the DVD titled Kisschasy: The Movie, it documents a tour by the band, a live show and some of their music videos.

In 2007, Kisschasy released their second studio album, titled Hymns for the Nonbeliever. It peaked at number five on the ARIA Albums Chart and featured their most successful single to date, "Opinions Won't Keep You Warm at Night", which peaked at number 10 on the ARIA Singles Chart. The album was also certified gold by ARIA. The band released a compilation album in 2008, Too B or Not Too B, featuring their previous music videos as well as their first two EPs, Darkside / Stay Awake and Cara Sposa.

In 2009, Kisschasy released their third studio album, Seizures.

In 2022, Kisschasey reunited. In May 2025, they released "Lie to Me"; the first new music in 16 years.

== Albums ==
=== Studio albums ===
List of studio albums, with selected details, chart positions and certifications
Title	Album details	Peak chart positions	Certifications (sales thresholds)
Title	Album details	AUS	Certifications (sales thresholds)
United Paper People	Released: 4 May 2005; Label: Below Par (PAR113)	15	ARIA: Gold
Hymns for the Nonbeliever	Released: 21 July 2007; Label: Below Par (PAR117)	5	ARIA: Gold
Seizures	Released: 21 August 2009; Label: Eleven: A Music Company (ELEVENCD89)	15	
The Terrors of Comfort	Released: 13 February 2026; Label: Kisschasy, Community Music (CM174LPA)	50	

=== Compilation albums ===
List of compilation albums, with selected details and chart positions
Title	Details	Peak chart positions
Title	Details	AUS
Fire in the Breeze	Released: 20 November 2004 (Japan); Label: Inya Face (FACE-001)	—N/a
Too B or Not Too B	Released: 10 May 2008; Label: Below Par (PAR 33)	61
"—" denotes a release that did not chart.

=== Video albums ===
List of video albums, with selected details
Title	Details
Kisschasy: The Movie	Released: 23 September 2006; Label: Below Par (PAR11DVD6)

== Extended plays ==
List of extended plays, with selected details
Title	Details
Darkside / Stay Awake	Released: 1 March 2004; Label: Below Par (PAR13)
Cara Sposa	Released: 4 October 2004; Label: Below Par (PAR19)

== Singles ==
Year	Title	Peak chart positions	Certifications (sales thresholds)	Album
Year	Title	AUS	Certifications (sales thresholds)	Album
2005	"Do-Do's & Whoa-Oh's"	25		United Paper People
2005	"Face Without a Name"	41		United Paper People
2005	"This Bed"	(promo)		United Paper People
2006	"The Shake"	25		United Paper People
2007	"Opinions Won't Keep You Warm at Night"	10	ARIA: Gold	Hymns for the Nonbeliever
2007	"Spray on Pants"	47		Hymns for the Nonbeliever
2008	"Strings and Drums"	(promo)		Hymns for the Nonbeliever
2008	"Ugly Birds in a Beautiful Cage"	(promo)		Hymns for the Nonbeliever
2009	"Generation Why"	72		Seizures
2009	"Turnaround"	—		Seizures
2010	"Dinosaur"	38	ARIA: Gold	Seizures
2025	"Lie to Me"	—		The Terrors of Comfort
2025	"Parasite"	—		The Terrors of Comfort
2025	"Uncomfortably Numb"	—		The Terrors of Comfort
2026	"Better"	—		The Terrors of Comfort
"—" denotes a release that did not chart.

== Other appearances ==
- 2005: Listen to Bob Dylan: A Tribute - "She Belongs to Me"
