= Too B or Not Too B =

Compilation album by Kisschasy
- Released: 10 May 2008
- Genre: Rock
- Length: 52:17
- Label: Below Par, Eleven: A Music Company, Virgin

Kisschasy chronology
Live at the Playroom (2007)	Too B or Not Too B (2008)	Seizures (2009)

Too B or Not Too B is the second compilation album by Australian alternative rock band Kisschasy, which reached the ARIA Albums Chart. It was released as their second compilation after their Japan-only release Fire in the Breeze in 2004, and directly after their 2007 Live at the Playroom EP, on 10 May 2008. The album contains a total of 16 tracks, taken from a mix of B-sides, songs from their 2004 EPs Darkside / Stay Awake and Cara Sposa and previously unreleased songs.

== Track listing ==
=== CD ===
1. "Darkside" (Darkside / Stay Awake) – 3:03
2. "Stay Awake" (Darkside / Stay Awake) – 3:07
3. "Anger is the Brand New Thing" (Darkside / Stay Awake) – 3:08
4. "Reminder" (Cara Sposa) – 3:04
5. "Love Affair with Distance" (Cara Sposa) – 3:20
6. "One Mistake" (Cara Sposa) – 3:18
7. "The Way They Walk" (Cara Sposa) – 3:27
8. "Resolution Wednesday" ("Do-Do's & Whoa-Oh's") – 2:52
9. "Doomsday" ("Do-Do's & Whoa-Oh's") – 3:30
10. "Hey Jealousy" (Gin Blossoms cover) ("Do-Do's & Whoa-Oh's") – 3:46
11. "It's Getting Easier to Die" ("The Shake") – 4:05
12. "The Boat" ("The Shake") – 3:26
13. "Electric in the Chair" (Previously unreleased) – 3:16
14. "Jack the Alien" (Previously unreleased) – 2:58
15. "Wake. Sleep. Turn. Repeat." (Previously unreleased) – 2:28
16. "Darkside" (acoustic) (Darkside / Stay Awake) – 3:40

=== DVD ===
1. "Do-Do's & Whoa-Oh's" (music video) – 3:32
2. "Face Without a Name" (music video) – 3:06
3. "The Shake" (music video) – 4:02
4. "This Bed" (music video) – 4:10
5. "Opinions Won't Keep You Warm at Night" (music video) – 3:06
6. "Spray on Pants" (music video) – 3:47
7. "Strings and Drums" (music video) – 3:12

== Charts ==
Chart (2008)	Peak position
Australian Albums (ARIA Charts)	61
