= Die!Die!Die! =

Die!Die!Die! may refer to:

- Die! Die! Die!, a three-piece New Zealand noise pop/punk/post-punk band
  - Die! Die! Die! (EP), 2005
  - Die! Die! Die! (album), 2006
- Die!Die!Die! (comics), a comic book written by Scott M. Gimple and Robert Kirkman with art by Chris Burnham and Nathan Fairbairn
