= Kisschasy: The Movie =

Video by Kisschasy
- Released: September 23, 2006
- Genre: Rock
- Length: Approx. 120 mins
- Label: Below Par
- Director: Jai Al-Attas

Kisschasy: The Movie is Kisschasy's first ever official DVD release. Kisschasy: The Movie follows Aussie band Kisschasy as they hit the road for their largest and longest tour to date. This tour covered 37 shows in only six weeks. The movie documents the entire tour, from the first morning they wake up til the last person standing at the home-coming party.

== DVD ==
=== Kisschasy Live @ the Gaelic Theatre ===
- "Intro" (Pantera cover)
- "Do-Do's & Whoa-Oh's"
- "Face Without a Name"
- "What We Become"
- "Water on a Stove"
- "Reminder"
- "Jam"
- "Hearing Voices Tonight"
- "Ione Skye"
- "Morning"
- "Black Dress"
- "The Shake"
- "United Paper People"
- "With Friends Like You, Who Needs Friends?"
- "One Mistake"
- "This Bed"
- "Anger Is the Brand New Thing"
- "You Wreck Me" (Tom Petty cover)

Mixed By Luke Gerard Webb

=== The documentary ===
Music videos with audio commentary by the band

- "Do-Do's & Whoa-Oh's"
- "Face Without a Name"
- "The Shake"
- "This Bed"

== Charts ==
Chart (2006)	Peak position
Australia Audio Vidual (ARIA Charts)	18
