= Promise (disambiguation) =

A promise is a transaction whereby a person makes a vow or the suggestion of a guarantee.

Promise(s) may also refer to:

== Film and TV ==
- Promise (1986 film), a Hallmark Hall of Fame television movie
- Promise (2005 film), a Finnish film
- Promise (2017 film), an Indonesian film
- Promise (2026 film), an Indian romantic drama film
- Promises (1975 film) or Promise of the Flesh, a South Korean film
- Promises (2001 film), an Israeli documentary
- Promises (2021 film), a French-Italian romantic drama film
- Promised (film), a 2019 Australian film featuring Paul Mercurio

=== Television ===
- "Promises" (Farscape), an episode of Farscape
- "Promises" (Hercules: The Legendary Journeys), an episode of Hercules: The Legendary Journeys
- "Promise" (Kanon), an episode of Kanon
- "Promises" (Secret Invasion), an episode of Secret Invasion
- "Promise" (Smallville), an episode of Smallville

== Music ==
=== Albums (Promise) ===
- Promise (Gene Loves Jezebel album), 1983
- Promise (The Maybes? album), 2008
- Promise (Sade album), 1985
- Promise, a 2009 album of music composed by Tenmon for the films directed by Makoto Shinkai

=== Albums (Promises) ===
- Promises (The Boxer Rebellion album), 2013
- Promises (Floating Points, Pharoah Sanders and the London Symphony Orchestra album), 2021
- Promises (The Hunters album), 2012
- Promises, by the Michael Garrick Sextet, 1965
- Promises, an EP by Naomi Scott, 2016
- Promises, an EP by Ryn Weaver, 2014

=== Songs ("Promise") ===
- "Promise" (Ciara song), 2006
- "Promise" (Delirious? song), 1997
- "Promise" (Jagged Edge song), 2000
- "Promise" (Kid Ink song), featuring Fetty Wap, 2015
- "Promise" (Kohmi Hirose song), 1997
- "Promise" (Luna Sea song), 2011
- "Promise" (Romeo Santos song), featuring Usher, 2011
- "Promise" (Tori Amos song), 2014
- "Promise" (Voyager song), Australian song for the Eurovision Song Contest 2023
- "Promise"/"Star", a double A-side single by Kumi Koda, 2005
- "Promise (You and Me)", by Reamonn, 2006
- "Promise", by Akira Yamaoka from the soundtrack of the video game Silent Hill 2
- "Promise", by Alex Lifeson from Victor
- "Promise", by Ateez from Treasure EP.2: Zero to One
- "Promise", by Ben Howard from Every Kingdom
- "Promise", by Black Rebel Motorcycle Club from Howl
- "Promise", by Cubic U (Hikaru Utada) from Precious
- "Promise", by Eve 6 from Horrorscope
- "Promise", by Girls' Generation from I Got a Boy
- "Promise", by Itzy from Girls Will Be Girls
- "Promise", by Janet Jackson from Unbreakable
- "Promise", by Krezip from Days Like This
- "Promise", by Laufey from Bewitched
- "Promise", by Lukas Graham from 3 (The Purple Album)
- "Promise", by Matchbook Romance from Stories and Alibis
- "Promise", by MUNA from About U
- "Promise", by Pedro the Lion from It's Hard to Find a Friend
- "Promise", by S.E.S. from Love
- "Promise", by Simple Plan from Still Not Getting Any...
- "Promise", by Slash featuring Chris Cornell from Slash
- "Promise", by Twice from Perfect World
- "Promise", by Vanessa Hudgens from her debut album V
- "Promise", by Violent Femmes from Violent Femmes

=== Songs ("Promises") ===
- "Promises" (7eventh Time Down song), 2015
- "Promises" (Andain song), 2011
- "Promises" (Barbra Streisand song), 1981
- "Promises" (Basia song), 1987
- "Promises" (Boy Kill Boy song), 2008
- "Promises" (Calvin Harris and Sam Smith song), 2018
- "Promises" (The Cranberries song), 1999
- "Promises" (Def Leppard song), 1999
- "Promises" (Eric Clapton song), 1978
- "Promises" (Maverick City Music song), 2020
- "Promises" (Nero song), 2011
- "Promises" (Randy Travis song), 1989
- "Promises" (Sanctus Real song), 2012
- "Promises" (Take That song), 1991
- "Promises", by Adema from Unstable
- "Promises", by Aly & AJ from Ten Years
- "Promises", by Badly Drawn Boy from Born in the U.K.
- "Promises", by Beach Bunny from Honeymoon
- "Promises", by Billie Piper from Walk of Life
- "Promises", by Buzzcocks (non-album single)
- "Promises", by Dragon from Body and the Beat
- "Promises", by Kylie Minogue from Body Language
- "Promises", by Luke Hemmings from Boy
- "Promises", by Megadeth from The World Needs a Hero
- "Promises", by Mumzy Stranger from Journey Begins
- "Promises", by Savage Garden, B-side of the singles "I Want You" and "Truly Madly Deeply"
- "Promises", by Sugababes from One Touch
- "Promises", by Trevor Rabin from Can't Look Away
- "Promises", by Wiz Khalifa from Blacc Hollywood
- "Promises", from the musical Once on This Island
- "Promises (As Years Go By)", a song by IQ from Nomzamo

=== Performers ===
- Promises (group), a late-1970s Canadian–American pop group
- Promise, a unit of Hololive

== People ==
=== Given name ===
- Promise (rapper), Canadian hip-hop artist
- Promise Amukamara (born 1993), Nigerian basketball player
- Promise David (born 2001), Canadian soccer player
- Promise Emmanuel, Nigerian writer, journalist and press secretary
- Promise Mkhuma (born 2000), South African footballer
- Promise Mkwananzi, Zimbabwean politician
- Promise Mthembu (born 1975), South African human rights activist
- Promise Omochere (born 2000), Irish footballer

=== Surname ===
- Beloved Promise (born 1990), American high jumper
- Isaac Promise (1987–2019), Nigerian footballer

== Places ==
- Promise, Oregon
- Promise, South Dakota
- Promise City, Iowa
- Promise Land, Tennessee or Promise

== Other uses ==
- Promises, a 2000 children's book by Elizabeth Winthrop, illustrated by Betsy Lewin
- Promise (toothpaste), a brand of toothpaste in India
- Promise (margarine), the US name for Becel margarine
- Futures and promises, the constructs used for synchronization in some concurrent computing
- Promise theory, a general theory of promises with applications in computing
- Promises Treatment Centers, a provider of residential drug and alcohol rehabilitation facilities in California, U.S.

== See also ==
- A Promise (disambiguation)
- I Promise (disambiguation)
- No Promises (disambiguation)
- Promise Me (disambiguation)
- Promises, Promises (disambiguation)
- The Promise (disambiguation)
