= Jai Al-Attas =

Australian record executive and film director (born 1983)

- Born: Jai Al-Attas; 1983 (age 42–43); Sydney, Australia
- Occupations: Owner of Below Par, film maker

Jai Al-Attas (born 1983) is the co-founder and co-owner of Australian independent label Below Par Records and the writer and director of the 2009 documentary film One Nine Nine Four.

== Below Par Records ==
Al-Attas co-founded Below Par Records (sometimes typeset BelowPARrecords) alongside Mark Catanzariti and Steven Chalker, in 2000. All three were only 16 and still in high school. The label concentrated on signing Australian indie bands, catering for rock artists and more specifically punk and its subgenres.

In 2002, the label won the Nescafé Big Break award, which was a Nescafé initiative, where the company gives away cash grants to people aged between 16 and 24, who have a dream or idea and need some financial support to make it a reality. The label was granted A$20,000. Below Par became a part of Australian Independent Records Labels Association (AIR)—similar to the Australian Recording Industry Association (ARIA), except independent-based—and then went on to sign Australian bands Something with Numbers and the now defunct For Amusement Only and Last Year’s Hero. They established a relationship with national independent distributor Inertia Music, which stocked their releases in both independent and chain retailers.

In January 2003, Below Par travelled to Los Angeles and New York City to meet of labels, artists, managers and agencies. They signed, toured and released an EP (Wake the Silent Day) for the band In the Grey, and then signed Brand New. In October 2003, they signed unknown Melbourne band Kisschasy and soon after announced a deal with Eleven: A Music Company.

Below Par has since worked with Jim Ward of Sparta, American rap rock artist MC Lars and pop punk band Yellowcard.

== Filmmaking ==
In 2006, Jai made his first film, a tour documentary for the Melbourne band Kisschasy, it was titled Kisschasy: The Movie. The film was nominated for an ARIA Award for Best Music DVD and made Rolling Stone's Top Music DVDs for 2006 list. In 2007, Al-Attas started a film production company called Robot Academy Films with producer Matt Wardle.

The company's first project is a feature-length documentary on the explosion of punk rock in the 90s, titled One Nine Nine Four, which he is writing and directing. The documentary is narrated by skateboarder Tony Hawk and features interviews and footage of various bands and figures in the punk scene including Billie Joe Armstrong of Green Day, Dexter Holland from The Offspring, Tim Armstrong from Rancid and Fat Mike from NOFX. Tom DeLonge and Mark Hoppus from Blink-182 also appear in the film.
