= Dinosaur (Kisschasy song) =

Single by Kisschasy

from the album Seizures
- Released: January 2010
- Recorded: 2009
- Studio: Sonora Recorders & Mant Studios, Los Angeles
- Genre: Alternative rock
- Length: 3:07
- Label: Below Par
- Songwriter(s): Darren Cordeux
- Producer(s): Rob Schnapf

Kisschasy singles chronology
"Turnaround" (2009)	"Dinosaur" (2010)

Written by the singer-guitarist, Darren Cordeux,"Dinosaur," is a song by Australian rock band Kisschasy. It is the third single released, in January 2010, from their third studio album, Seizures (August 2009), and It reached the top 40 on the ARIA Singles Chart. By the end of that year it was certified gold by ARIA for shipment of 35,000 units.

== Music video ==
A music video has been created for the single. The video was created by a university student and features two animated dinosaurs.

== Charts ==
Chart (2010)	Peak position
Australia (ARIA)	38

== Certifications ==
Region	Certification	Certified units/sales
Australia (ARIA)	Gold	35,000^{^}
^{^} Shipments figures based on certification alone.
