= The Promise =

The Promise may refer to:

== Film, television, and radio ==
=== Film ===
- The Promise (1917 film), a silent film starring Paul Willis
- The Promise (1969 film), a film starring Ian McKellen
- The Promise (1979 film), an American romantic drama
- The Promise (1995 film) (German: Das Versprechen), a film directed by Margarethe von Trotta
- La Promesse (French, The Promise), a 1996 film by the Dardenne brothers
- The Promise (1999 film), a made-for-television film starring Tracy Nelson
- The Promise (2005 film), a Chinese fantasy film
- The Promise (2007 film), a Filipino version of Wuthering Heights
- The Promise (2008 film), an Egyptian film starring Asser Yassin
- The Promise (2016 film), a historical drama about the Armenian Genocide, starring Oscar Isaac and Charlotte Le Bon
- The Promise (2017 film), a Thai horror film
- Killing for Love (film), also known as The Promise, a 2016 documentary about Jens Söring and Elizabeth Haysom

=== Television and radio ===
- Kasamh Se, also known as The Promise; a 2006 Indian soap opera
- Pangako Sa 'Yo (International broadcast title: The Promise), a Filipino primetime soap opera series
- The Promise (2011 TV serial), a UK series directed by Peter Kosminsky
- The Promise (2016 TV series), a Korean daily drama series aired by KBS
- "The Promise" (Ally McBeal), a 1997 television episode
- "The Promise" (The Amazing World of Gumball), a 2013 television episode
- "The Promise" (Arrow), a 2014 television episode
- "The Promise" (Cold Case), a 2005 television episode
- "The Promise" (Justified), a 2015 television episode
- "The Promise" (The Larry Sanders Show), a 1992 television episode
- "The Promise", a 1955 installment of the Hallmark Hall of Fame
- The Promise (podcast), a podcast produced by Nashville Public Radio

== Literature ==
=== Fiction ===
- The Promise (Galgut novel), 2021, by Damon Galgut
- The Promise (Kratochvil novel), 2009, by Jiří Kratochvil
- The Promise (Potok novel), 1969, by Chaim Potok
- Avatar: The Last Airbender – The Promise, a 2012 graphic novel by Gene Yang
- The Promise, a 1943 novel by Pearl S. Buck
- The Promise, a 1989 novel by Monica Hughes
- The Promise, a 1978 novel by Danielle Steel
- The Promise, a 2012 novel by Nikita Singh
- The Promise, a 2005 short-story collection by Ted Dekker

=== Nonfiction ===
- The Promise: God's Purpose and Plan for When Life Hurts, a 2008 book by Jonathan Morris
- The Promise: President Obama, Year One, a 2010 book by Jonathan Alter

== Theatre ==
- The Promise (musical), an annual outdoor passion play in Texas, US
- The Promise (1965 play), a play by Aleksei Nikolaevich Arbuzov
- The Promise (2010 play), a play by Ben Brown

== Music ==
=== Albums ===
- The Promise (Bif Naked album), 2009
- The Promise (Bruce Springsteen album), 2010 2-CD compilation album
  - The Promise: The Darkness on the Edge of Town Story, 2010 3-CD, 3-DVD or Blu-ray box set by Bruce Springsteen
- The Promise (Deborah Cox album), 2008
- The Promise (Earth, Wind & Fire album), 2003
- The Promise (Fly to the Sky album), 2001
- The Promise (Freestyle Fellowship album), 2011
- The Promise (Il Divo album), 2008
- The Promise (John McLaughlin album), 1995
- The Promise (Kirk Whalum album), 1989
- The Promise (Mike Pinder album), 1976
- The Promise (Plus One album), 2000
- The Promise (T'Pau album), 1991
- The Promise (Vassilis Tsabropoulos album), 2008
- The Promise (Vaya Con Dios album), 2004
- The Promise, an album by David Hobson
- The Promise, a 2001 album by Forgotten Tales
- The Promise, a 2010 album by Marc Roberts
- The Promise, a 1993 album by Ringworm
- The Promise: A Celebration of Christ's Birth, a 1991 album by Michael Card

=== Songs ===
- "The Promise" (Arcadia song), 1986
- "The Promise" (Chris Cornell song), 2017
- "The Promise" (Girls Aloud song), 2008
- "The Promise" (In This Moment song), 2010
- "The Promise" (When in Rome song), 1988
- "The Promise", by Andy Black from The Ghost of Ohio
- "The Promise", by Bruce Springsteen from 18 Tracks
- "The Promise", by Essence
- "The Promise", by Framing Hanley from A Promise to Burn
- "The Promise", by Holy Knights from A Gate Through the Past
- "The Promise", by Johnny Clegg from Heat, Dust and Dreams
- "The Promise", by Kris Kristofferson from A Moment of Forever
- "The Promise", by Reks from The Greatest X
- "The Promise", by Tony Moran
- "The Promise", by Tracy Chapman from New Beginning
- "The Promise", by Within Temptation from Mother Earth
- "The Heart Asks Pleasure First/The Promise", by Michael Nyman for the soundtrack of the 1993 film The Piano

== See also ==
- A Promise (disambiguation)
- Promise (disambiguation)
- I Promise (disambiguation)
- Promises, Promises (disambiguation)
