= Promises, Promises =

Promises, Promises may refer to:

== Music ==
- Promises, Promises (musical), a 1968 musical based on the 1960 film The Apartment, or the title song
  - Promises, Promises (original Broadway cast recording), a 1969 album containing a recording of the musical made by its original Broadway cast
  - Promises, Promises (2010 Broadway revival cast recording), a 2010 album containing a recording of the musical made by its 2010 Broadway revival cast

=== Other albums ===
- Promises, Promises (Lynn Anderson album) or the title song (see below), 1967
- Promises, Promises (Die! Die! Die! album) or the title song, 2008
- Promises, Promises (Dionne Warwick album), including the title song from the musical, 1968
- Promises, Promises, by Lake Street Dive, 2008

=== Songs ===
- "Promises, Promises" (The Cooper Temple Clause song), 2003
- "Promises, Promises" (Incubus song), 2011
- "Promises, Promises" (Lynn Anderson song), 1968
- "Promises, Promises" (Naked Eyes song), 1983
- "Promises, Promises", by Christopher Williams from Adventures in Paradise, 1989
- "Promises, Promises", by Exile from Hang On to Your Heart, 1985
- "Promises, Promises", by Nik Kershaw from You've Got to Laugh, 2006

== Television episodes ==
- "Promises, Promises" (ALF), 1988
- "Promises, Promises" (Doctors), 2004
- "Promises Promises!" (The Raccoons), 1990
- "Promises, Promises" (Roseanne), 1993
- Promises, Promises, an episode of Shining Time Station, 1989

== Other media ==
- Promises! Promises!, a 1963 American sex-comedy film
- Promises, Promises, a Beacon Street Girls novel by Annie Bryant

== See also ==
- Promise (disambiguation)
- The Promise (disambiguation)
- A Promise (disambiguation)
