= God's Plan =

God's Plan may refer to:

== Theological concepts ==
- God's plan, or the Will of God
- Salvation, the saving of a soul from sin and its consequences
  - Plan of salvation, a Christian concept describing God's plan to save humanity
  - Plan of salvation (Latter Day Saints), a Latter Day Saints principle on God's plan to save, redeem, and exalt humankind
- Eschatology, a part of theology concerned with the final events of history, or the ultimate destiny of humanity
- Predestination, the doctrine that all events have been willed by God

== Music ==
- God's Plan (album), a 2002 mixtape by 50 Cent and G-Unit
- "God's Plan" (song), a 2018 song by Drake
- "God's Plan", a song by Irish singer Derek Ryan from his 2010 album A Mother's Son
- "God's Plan", a 2018 song by Chvrches from Love Is Dead
- "God's Plan", a 2024 song by Mother Mother from Grief Chapter

== See also ==
- Divine providence, God's intervention in the Universe
  - Providentialism
- The Promise: God's Purpose and Plan for When Life Hurts, a Catholic self-help book
