= Oath (disambiguation) =

An oath is a statement of fact, or a promise as a sign of truth.

Oath may also refer to:

- Oath (horse) (foaled 1996), Thoroughbred race horse
- "Oath" (song), Cher Lloyd and Becky G, 2012
- Oath Inc., a renamed and divested subsidiary of Verizon
- Oath, a medieval village in the parish of Aller, Somerset, England
- Oath: Chronicles of Empire and Exile, a board game published by Leder Games
- OATH, an acronym from the phrase "open authentication" in Initiative for Open Authentication
- Oath of office, an official promise by a person elected to public office to lawfully fulfil its duties

== See also ==
- The Oath (disambiguation)
- Swear (disambiguation)
- Minced oath, a euphemistic expression formed by misspelling, mispronouncing, or replacing a part of a profane, blasphemous, or taboo language
- OAuth, an open standard for access delegation
- Přísaha (Czech, 'Oath'), an extra-parliamentary political party in the Czech Republic
