= I Promise =

I Promise may refer to:

- "I Promise" (Stacie Orrico song), a 2004 song by Stacie Orrico
- "I Promise" (Radiohead song), a 2017 song by Radiohead
- "I Promise", a song by Lil Baby from his 2025 album WHAM
- "I Promise", a song by Royce da 5'9" from his 2004 album Death Is Certain
- I Promise (album), a 2006 album by Jin
- I Promise (film), a 1994 Austrian drama film
- I Promise School, an elementary school in Akron, Ohio
- I Promise, a 2020 television series on Quibi
- Kasamh Se (lit. 'I Promise'), an Indian Hindi-language television series

== See also ==
- I Swear (disambiguation)
- A Promise (disambiguation)
- Promise (disambiguation)
- The Promise (disambiguation)
- I Promise You (disambiguation)
