= This Bed =

This Bed may refer to:

- "This Bed", a song by Alicia Keys from her 2009 album The Element of Freedom
- "This Bed", a song by Kisschasy from their 2005 album United Paper People
