= Schwörer =

Schwörer, Schworer or Schwoerer (from Middle High German swern "to swear, affirm something under oath"; Swerer "swearer") is a German-language surname. It may be derived from a status name originally denoting a public official in legal matters, or from a nickname for a person who swears a lot, or from the altered ( ä > ö) word Schwär, regional for Schwager, 'father-in-law'. It may refer to:

- Angie Schworer (1965), American actress
- Anika Schwörer (2001), Swiss volleyball player
- Hermann Schwörer (1922–2017), German politician
- Lois G. Schwoerer, American historian

== See also ==
- Swearer (disambiguation)
