= Stay with Me Bright Eyes =

Single by Something with Numbers

from the album Engineering the Soul
- Released: 22 June 2008
- Genre: Pop punk, rock
- Label: Below Par

Something with Numbers singles chronology
"Goodbye Mickey Finn" (2007)	"Stay with Me Bright Eyes" (2008)	"We'll Fight" (2008)

"Stay with My Bright Eyes" is a song by Australian band Something with Numbers; it was the first single from their third studio album Engineering the Soul.

The single was listed at number 48 on the Triple J Hottest 100, 2008 and had a music video created which received airplay on Video Hits and Channel V.

== Track listing ==
1. "Stay with Me Bright Eyes"
2. "Night Before"
3. "Zombie" (acoustic)

== Charts ==
Chart performance for "Stay with Me Bright Eyes"
Chart (2008)	Peak position
Australia (ARIA)	52
