= No Promises =

No Promises may refer to:

== Albums ==
- No Promises (Carla Bruni album) (2007)
- No Promises (Icehouse album) (1997)

== Songs ==
- "No Promises" (Bryan Rice song), a 2005 song from the soundtrack of Nynne, covered by Shayne Ward in 2006
- "No Promises" (Cheat Codes song), a 2017 song by Cheat Codes featuring Demi Lovato
- "No Promises" (Icehouse song), (1985)
- "No Promises", by Shawn Mendes from the album Illuminate
- "No Promises", by A Boogie wit da Hoodie from the album The Bigger Artist

== See also ==
- Promise (disambiguation)
