= Promises, Promises (Die! Die! Die! album) =

Studio album by Die! Die! Die!
- Released: 5 February 2008
- Recorded: 2007
- Genre: Punk rock
- Length: 39:34
- Label: Tardus Etch And Sketch SAF Records
- Producer: Shayne Carter

Die! Die! Die! chronology
Die! Die! Die! (2006)	Promises, Promises (2008)	Form (2010)

Promises, Promises is the second studio album by New Zealand punk rock band Die! Die! Die!.

== Background and release ==
Promises, Promises was produced by Shayne Carter (Straitjacket Fits, Dimmer). The album was engineered by Kevin McMahoon and mastered by Howie Weinberg at Masterdisk. The cover art was designed and hand sewn by Mark Rutledge.

It was released on 5 February 2008 via Tardus in New Zealand and via SAF records in the US and Canada.

== Critical reception ==
Professional ratings
Review scores
Source	Rating
NME	(8/10)
AllMusic	3.5/5 stars
The A.V. Club	(A−)
The Guardian	4/5 stars

Promises, Promises was well received by music journalists. Metacritic, a site which provides a normalised rating out of 100 based on reviews from critics, gives the album a score of 78.

Camilla Pia of the NME said of the album, "their relentless, unsettling sound is every bit as thrilling as their heavily punctuated name suggests, with this second offering stripped right down to the gnarled, bare bones of art punk."

Jason Heller of The A.V. Club noted that their second album "crams splinters of rhythm into dark, gorgeous choruses and acidic shout-alongs. The venom is still there, and it's just as potent, but it tastes a little sweeter this time around"

== Track listing ==
All songs by Andrew Wilson, Michael Prain, Lachlan Anderson, except track 13, by Die! Die! Die! & H. Oliver.

1. "Blinding" – 3:01
2. "Britomart Sunset" – 2:17
3. "Sideways Here We Come" – 4:32
4. "Death to the Last Romantic" – 2:33
5. "Whitehorses" – 4:41
6. "A.T.T.I.T.U.D." – 2:56
7. "Maybe: Definitely" – 2:27
8. "People Talk" – 3:29
9. "Promises, Promises" – 1:54
10. "Hold Me" – 3:03
11. "ECHOECHO" – 2:54
12. "Throw a Fit" – 1:51
13. "Blue Skies" – 3:55

== Personnel ==
- Andrew Wilson – lead vocals, guitars
- Lachlan Anderson - bass guitar
- Michael Prain – drums
