= I Swear =

I Swear may refer to:

- I Swear (film), a 2025 British biographical drama about John Davidson
- I Swear (album), by Inhale Exhale, 2008
- "I Swear" (Ice Prince song), 2013
- "I Swear" (John Michael Montgomery song), 1993; covered by All-4-One, 1994
- "I Swear" (N-Dubz song), 2006
- "I Swear", a song by Sistar from Sweet & Sour, 2014
- "I Swear", a song by Wyclef Jean from J'ouvert, 2016

== See also ==
- Swear (disambiguation)
- I Promise (disambiguation)
