= The Oath =

The Oath may refer to:

== Books ==
- The Oath (Wiesel novel), a 1973 novel by Elie Wiesel
- The Oath (Peretti novel), a 1995 novel by Frank E. Peretti
- The Oath (Toobin book), a 2012 book by Jeffrey Toobin

== Film and TV ==
=== Films ===
- The Oath (1921 American film), by Raoul Walsh and starring Miriam Cooper
- The Oath (1921 British film), a silent British film by Fred Paul
- The Oath (2005 film), a short film by Nathan Collett
- The Oath (2010 film), a documentary by Laura Poitras
- The Oath (2016 film), an Icelandic film
- The Oath (2018 film), a black comedy by Ike Barinholtz
- The Oath (2023 film), loosely based on the Book of Mormon.

=== Television ===
- The Oath (American TV series), a 2018 Crackle series
- The Oath (Singaporean TV series), a Singaporean series
- The Walking Dead: The Oath, a three-part web series between seasons three and four of the TV series The Walking Dead
- "The Oath" (The Americans), a 2013 episode
- "The Oath" (Battlestar Galactica), a 2009 episode
- "The Oath" (Big Love), a 2011 episode
- "The Oath" (Billions), a 2017 episode
- "The Oath" (CSI: Miami), a 2004 episode

== Music ==
- "The Oath", a song by Street Sweeper Social Club on the album Street Sweeper Social Club
- "The Oath", a song by Mercyful Fate on the album Don't Break the Oath
- "The Oath", a song by Kiss on the album Music from "The Elder"
- "The Oath", a song by Manowar from Sign of the Hammer
- "The Oath", a song by KXNG CROOKED on the album Good vs. Evil

== Other ==
- The Oath (video game), a shoot 'em up video game

== See also ==
- Oath (disambiguation)
