= Die! Die! Die! (EP) =

EP by Die! Die! Die!
- Released: 23 March 2005
- Recorded: 15 November 2004
- Genre: Punk rock
- Length: 13:51
- Label: Unstable Ape Records

Die! Die! Die! chronology
Die! Die! Die! (2005)	Die! Die! Die! (2006)

Die! Die! Die! is the debut EP by New Zealand trio Die! Die! Die!.

It was recorded by Dale Cotton on 15 November 2004 at Platform Studios in Auckland, NZ.

It was released on March 23, 2005, on Unstable Ape Records in Australia and New Zealand.

== Track listing ==
1. Ashtray! Ashtray! - 2:46
2. Made Up In Red - 1:06
3. Auckland is Burning - 2:36
4. Shyness Will Get You Nowhere - 2:02
5. Rat - 1:21
6. Brat - 4:00
