= Perfect Distraction =

Studio album by Something with Numbers
- Released: 7 October 2006
- Length: 39:49
- Label: Below Par

Something with Numbers chronology
Etiquette (2004)	Perfect Distraction (2006)	Engineering the Soul (2008)

Singles from Perfect Distraction
- 1. "Apple of the Eye (Lay Me Down)" Released: 9 September 2006; 2. "Chase the Chaser" Released: 2007; 3. "Goodbye Mickey Finn" Released: 5 May 2007

Perfect Distraction is the second studio album by Australian punk rock band Something with Numbers. It was released on 7 October 2006 and is credited as the album which gave the band their commercial break through, featuring the hit single, "Apple of the Eye (Lay Me Down)" and peaking on the ARIA Albums Chart at number 37.

The album features three songs that were released as singles. The first and most popular being "Apple of the Eye (Lay Me Down)". "Apple of the Eye" peaked at number 34 on the ARIA singles chart, and placed number 64 on the Triple J Hottest 100, 2006. The second single from the album was "Chase the Chaser", it failed to reach the ARIA charts, but did receive airplay on Australian music television network, Channel V. The third single was "Goodbye Mickey Finn", which is the song which is "the most personal and has the most meaning to the band members", seeing "the band tone it down a notch" while witnessing the "catalyst for the biggest change in their creative careers".

== Track listing ==
1. "Spent" – 3:20
2. "Apple of the Eye (Lay Me Down)" – 3:29
3. "Chase the Chaser" – 3:05
4. "Zombie" – 4:11
5. "Bang, Bang, Bang" – 3:35
6. "Goodbye Mickey Finn" – 4:18
7. "Calf Love" – 3:21
8. "What Is This?" – 3:03
9. "Double Dyed" – 4:09
10. "Bring Me Some Water" – 4:02
11. "Agony" – 3:20

== Charts ==
Chart performance for Perfect Distraction
Chart (2006)	Peak position
Australian Albums (ARIA)	37
