= Yeh Vaada Raha =

Yeh Vaada Raha (transl. I Promise You) may refer to:

- Yeh Vaada Raha (film), a 1982 Indian Hindi-language romantic drama film by Ramesh Behl, starring Rishi Kapoor, Poonam Dhillon and Tina Ambani
  - "Yeh Vaada Raha", title song of the 1982 film by R. D. Burman, Asha Bhosle and Kishore Kumar
- Yeh Vaada Raha (TV series), an Indian Hindi-language television show that aired on Zee TV

== See also ==
- I Promise You (disambiguation)
- Yeh Wada Raha, a 2003 Pakistani Urdu language film
