= Promise Me =

Promise Me may refer to:

== Music ==
=== Albums ===
- Promise Me, an album by CoCo Lee, 1994
- Promise Me, an album by Nayobe, or the title song, 1990

=== Songs ===
- "Promise Me" (Beverley Craven song), 1990
- "Promise Me" (Lil Suzy song), 1994
- "Promise Me", a song by Badflower from OK, I'm Sick, 2019
- "Promise Me", a song by the Cover Girls from Show Me, 1986
- "Promise Me", a song by Dead by April from Dead by April, 2009
- "Promise Me", a song by Luther Vandross from Forever, for Always, for Love, 1982
- "Promise Me", a song by Jess Glynne from Jess (2024)
- "Promise Me", a song by Modest Fok, 1992
- "Promise Me", a song by The Saturdays from On Your Radar, 2011
- "Promise Me", a song by We Came as Romans from Cold Like War, 2017

== Other uses ==
- Promise Me (novel), a 2006 novel by Harlan Coben
- Redfern Now: Promise Me, a 2015 Australian telemovie concluding theTV series Redfern Now
