= I Promise You =

I Promise You may refer to:

- "I Promise You (Get Ready)", a 1987 song by Samantha Fox
- "I Promise You (I.P.U.)", a 2018 song by Wanna One
- "I Promise You", a song composed by Harold Arlen and Johnny Mercer for the 1944 film Here Come the Waves
- "I Promise You", a song by Selena Gomez & the Scene from Kiss & Tell, 2009
- "I Promise You", a 2015 song by Mohsen Yeganeh
- "I Promise You (With Everything I Am)", a 2000 song by the Backstreet Boys from Black & Blue
- Aap Ki Kasam (transl. I Promise You), a 1974 Indian Hindi-language romantic drama film starring Rajesh Khanna and Mumtaz
- Tujhe Meri Kasam (transl. I Promise You), a 2003 Indian Hindi-language romance film by K. Vijaya Bhaskar, starring Riteish Deshmukh and Genelia D'Souza

== See also ==
- I Promise (disambiguation)
- Yeh Vaada Raha (disambiguation)
