= Etiquette (Something with Numbers album) =

Studio album by Something with Numbers
- Released: September 20, 2004
- Genre: Punk, Rock, Soul
- Label: Below Par

Something with Numbers chronology
The Barnicles & Stripes EP (2002)	Etiquette (2004)	Perfect Distraction (2006)

Etiquette is the debut album by Australian punk rock band Something with Numbers. It was released in 2004, through Below Par Records.

== Track listing ==
1. "Prelude"
2. "Words Mean Nothing"
3. "Against the Wind"
4. "Listen"
5. "Crowner of Kings"
6. "I'm Sorry I'm Wrong"
7. "On the Inside"
8. "Take My Life"
9. "Far from a Fairy Tale"
10. "Where I Used to Breathe"
11. "The Last Thing on My Mind"
12. "Falling Out of Touch"
