= Jonathan Morris (commentator) =

American journalist (born 1972)

Orders
- Ordination: December 24, 2002 by Leonardo Sandri
- Laicized: May 2019; by Pope Francis

Personal details
- Born: August 22, 1972 (age 54) Cleveland, Ohio, US
- Denomination: Catholic Church
- Spouse: Kaitlyn Folmer (m. 2020)
- Occupation: Catholic priest (laicized), author, television personality

Jonathan Morris (born August 22, 1972) is an American author, actor, commentator on religious matters in the media who has been a Fox News contributor and analyst since 2005. He formerly served as a Catholic priest, first in the Legionaries of Christ and later as a secular priest in the Archdiocese of New York. In 2019, he requested dispensation from the clerical state.

== Biography ==
Born in Cleveland, Ohio, the third of seven children, Morris studied business administration at Franciscan University of Steubenville in Ohio, where he served as vice president of the University Student Government.

At the age of 21, he entered the seminary and studied in Rome, Italy, gaining degrees in the classical humanities, philosophy, and theology. He was ordained a priest in the order of the Legion of Christ in 2002, and continued living and working in Rome. In 2004, he obtained a graduate Licentiate degree in moral theology from Pontifical Athenaeum Regina Apostolorum, magna cum laude.

In 2009, Morris left the Legion of Christ and joined the Archdiocese of New York as a diocesan priest. He then served as parochial vicar of Basilica of St. Patrick's Old Cathedral in the Soho neighborhood of New York City. In 2013, he was transferred to Corpus Christi Church in Manhattan to serve as a chaplain at Columbia University and to be the program director of The Catholic Channel on SiriusXM radio.

In February 2015, Morris became pastor of The Church of Our Lady of Mount Carmel, located on East 187th St. in the Bronx.

In May 2019, while on sabbatical, Morris announced that he had decided to request dispensation from the clerical state after having:

struggled for years with [his] vocation and the commitments that the Catholic priesthood demands, especially not being able to marry and raise a family. I have decided to ask the Holy Father, Pope Francis, to release me from the duties and responsibilities of the clerical state (priestly vows). Taking this step is something I have considered often and at length in years past and discussed with my spiritual guides. ... My decision is not about an existing relationship, but rather about the peace and spiritual freedom I trust will come in the future by following God’s will for my life now.

His request was approved by Pope Francis. Cardinal Timothy Dolan had granted Morris' request to be removed from active ministry.

=== Post-priesthood ===
Shortly after leaving the priesthood, Morris co-founded Morris & Larson Advisors, an executive coaching firm. Morris continues to work as a contributor for Fox News.

In July 2020, Morris announced he was engaged to 37-year-old Kaitlyn Folmer, a reporter with ABC News. The couple were married in October 2020, at St Patrick's Cathedral in New York City.

== Work ==
From 2002 to 2004, Morris worked as a theological adviser in the making of Mel Gibson's motion picture The Passion of the Christ.

During the final illness of Pope John Paul II in March 2005, and his death the following 5 April, Morris provided reports and analysis for CNN, the Fox News Channel, the BBC, and Sky News, and he was interviewed by Bill Hemmer, Larry King, Shepard Smith, Anderson Cooper, and Christiane Amanpour, among others. Shortly thereafter, Morris received offers from several networks to contribute follow-up reports, and he began working for the Fox News Channel. In accepting the offer to work with the network, he proposed to cover not just Vatican news events, but to also analyze wider news stories from an ethical dimension.

Since April 2005, Morris' work has expanded to include reports beyond the scope of the Vatican. He has been interviewed on several Fox News Channel programs, including Fox & Friends, Dayside, Hannity and Colmes, The Live Desk with Martha MacCallum, and The O'Reilly Factor. He has also contributed to the Fox Business Network and Fox News.com's on-line news roundtable, The Strategy Room.

Morris began a recurring segment for Fox News Channel's late night news/comedy show Red Eye in May 2009. For this segment, called Father Knows Best, Morris answered questions from viewers on religious and faith-related issues. He was also a regular news contributor for the show. That same year, he also became a contributor to The Wall Street Journal.

In March 2010, Morris was interviewed as a theological adviser for the History Channel special The Real Face of Jesus?, a documentary that followed a team of computer and 3D specialists as they uncovered forensic data from the Shroud of Turin, extrapolating a new picture of the face of the man from the shroud.

In 2012 Morris became the program director of The Catholic Channel on Sirius XM Satellite Radio, a position he held until 2015.

Morris has written The Promise: God's Purpose and Plan for When Life Hurts and God Wants You Happy: From Self-Help to God's Help. His newest book is The Way of Serenity: Finding Peace and Happiness in the Serenity Prayer.

In 2019, Morris appeared as Frank Sheeran’s priest at the nursing home in the film The Irishman, starring Robert De Niro, Al Pacino, and Joe Pesci.
