= Swear =

Swear or Swearing may refer to:

- Making an oath, also known as swearing an oath
- Profanity

== Music ==
- "Swear" (Tim Scott McConnell song), a 1980s pop song, single for Sheena Easton 1985
- "Swear" (Alan song), a j-pop song by Alan Dawa Dolma from the album My Life
- "I Swear", a song by John Michael Montgomery, later covered by All-4-One
- Swear, an early 1980’s instrumental song by Japanese fusion jazz band Casiopea

== Other uses ==
- "I Swear", a 2025 Scottish biographical drama film directed, written, and produced by Kirk Jones
- "Swear" (The Walking Dead), a 2016 television episode of The Walking Dead
- Swear (brand), a Taiwanese lingerie brand

== See also ==
- Swearer (disambiguation)
- I Swear (disambiguation)
