= Amber Calling =

- Also known as: 919
- Origin: Adelaide, South Australia, Australia
- Genres: Indie, pop punk, emo
- Years active: 2005–2012
- Label: Tenspeed
- Members: Dave Porcaro; Mike Porcaro; Tom Vasic; Brennen Shrubsole; Anthony Richards
- Past members: Adrian Porcaro; Dylan Smith; Harvey Davidson; Alex Dakiniewicz; Andrew Campbell; Mat Kowal; Ryan Sheldon; Ryan Atyeo
- Website: ambercalling.com.au

Amber Calling are an Australian pop punk and emo band from Adelaide, which formed in 2005 as 919. They issued an extended play, Road Rage (2006), under that name. Their second EP, The Truth About Lies appeared on 14 April 2008. Amber Calling issued their debut album, Run Home Jack. Home Run Jack, on 31 May 2011. During their career they have supported shows by Grinspoon, Kenny Vasoli, Panic! at the Disco, and Short Stack.

== History ==
Amber Calling are a pop-punk and emo band which formed in Adelaide in 2005 as 919 by Adrian Porcaro on bass guitar and his cousins Dave Porcaro (aka Davye Style-Jones) on guitar and vocals, and Mike Porcaro (aka Mike Styles-Jones) on lead vocals. In 2006 under the name, 919, they issued their debut extended play, Road Rage, with five tracks. It was produced by Darren Thompson with the band line-up of Dave and Mike joined by Matt Kowal on drums and Harvey Davidson on bass guitar and backing vocals. PostOp described the release as "[t]here isn’t a single track on this disc, that you won’t want to listen to over and over and over again, and the cherry on top of this magnificent musical sundae is the jaw dropping 'This Cell'". During 2007 the group supported performances by fellow Australian artists, Grinspoon and by Something with Numbers. Mike developed throat problems and had to leave the group for five months to recover.

After September 2007 they changed their name to Amber Calling. On 14 April 2008 the group issued an EP, The Truth About Lies on the Tenspeed Music label. Tom Vasic (aka Tommy Ortiz, ex-Capulet) joined in August that year on keyboards and backing vocals. Vasic's first gig with the group was their support show for Panic! at the Disco that same month. In August 2009, for their national tour, they released a single, "Drive Drive" which was "about wanting to just pack up and leave, like so many people around the world I’m sure have felt like that before". In September that year they supported US artist, Kenny Vasoli, on his tour appearance in Adelaide. In 2010 they supported Short Stack at the Adelaide Entertainment Centre.

On 31 May 2011 they released their debut album Run Home Jack. Home Run Jack. It was recorded at Slaugherhouse Studios, from June 2010 to January 2011 with the band producing and it was mastered by Steve Smart (The Living End, The John Butler Trio, Parkway Drive, Bodyjar) of 301 Studios. For the album Dave, Mike and Vasic were joined by Brennan Shrubsole on drums, Adam Cameron on guitar, Anthony Richards on bass guitar. In August that year, United States crunkcore group, Brokencyde, announced that Amber Calling would be supporting their show in Adelaide in October.

During 2010 the band supported Attack! Attack!, Cute Is What We Aim For, Lydia, the Wonder Years, Fireworks. During their career they have supported Kris Roe/The Ataris, Carpathian, The Used, Cobra Starship, The Academy Is, The Matches, The Getaway Plan, Closure in Moscow, Behind Crimson Eyes, Rise Against, Aiden, Pierce the Veil and Man Overboard.

== Members ==
Current members

- Dave Porcaro (aka Davye Style-Jones) – lead guitar, backing vocals
- Mike Porcaro (aka Mike Styles-Jones aka Mike Jones) – lead vocals
- Tom Vasic (aka Tommy Ortiz) – vocals, synthesiser
- Adam Cameron – guitar
- Brennen Shrubsole – drums
- Anthony Richards – bass guitar

Former members

- Adrian Porcaro – bass guitar
- Dylan Smith – guitar, vocals
- Harvey Davidson – bass guitar
- Alex Dakiniewicz – bass guitar
- Andrew Campbell – vocals
- Matt Kowal – drums
- Ryan Sheldon – drums
- Ryan Atyeo – guitar

== Discography ==
=== Albums ===
- 2011: Run Home Jack. Home Run Jack

=== Extended plays ===
- 2006: Road Rage (released under the band name: 919)
- 2008: The Truth About Lies

=== Singles ===
- 2009: "Coming Home"
- 2009: "Drive, Drive"
