= Engineering the Soul =

Studio album by Something with Numbers
- Released: 6 September 2008
- Recorded: March/April 2008
- Studio: Mission Sound Studios (Brooklyn, New York)
- Length: 44:47
- Label: Below Par
- Producer: Tim O'Heir

Something with Numbers chronology
Perfect Distraction (2006)	Engineering the Soul (2008)	Eleven Eleven (2013)

Singles from Engineering the Soul
- 1. "Stay with Me Bright Eyes" Released: 28 June 2008; 2. "We'll Fight" Released: 13 December 2008; 3. "89 Freedom Street" Released: 2009

Professional ratings
Review scores
Source	Rating
Access All Areas	(positive) link
The Dwarf	(positive) link
Rave Magazine	link
Web Wombat	link

Engineering the Soul is the third studio album by Australian punk rock band Something with Numbers. It was released through Below Par Records on 6 September 2008. In reference to the title of the album, lead vocalist of Something with Numbers Jake Grigg said, "Music is what powers the soul. We make the music. We are engineering the soul".

The first song off the album to be released to radio airplay was "Stay with Me Bright Eyes". It was released as a CD single in stores and as a digital download on 28 June 2008. It reached number 52 on the ARIA Chart and received airplay on Australian music television network, Channel V.

The first pressing of the album came with a bonus DVD featuring the "Stay with Me Bright Eyes" video and 'Behind the Scenes', the 12 min Engineering the Soul EPK, plus all the videos for the singles from SWN's previous album. On 14 September 2008, Engineering the Soul debuted at number 20 on the ARIA Albums Chart.

== Production ==
Something with Numbers left Australia in late February 2008, bound for New York. They arrived on 19 February, and began pre-production for the new album on 21 February. Production for the album commenced on 3 March, upon completion of pre-production. The album was recorded over nine weeks from March to April, at Mission Sound Studios, Brooklyn, New York, in the United States. It was produced by Tim O'Heir, who is known for collaborations with bands such as Dinosaur Jr., The All-American Rejects and Say Anything.

== Track listing ==
1. "Stay with Me Bright Eyes" – 4:05
2. "It's All Gonna Happen Again" – 2:41
3. "We'll Fight" – 4:06
4. "Twisted" – 3:57
5. "This Will Be the Last Time" – 3:34
6. "Diamonds" – 3:41
7. "89 Freedom Street" – 4:10
8. "Seventeen Places" – 3:59
9. "Yesterday" – 4:21
10. "Pants on Fire" – 2:52
11. "Don't Spend Forever" – 3:42
12. "I'll Be There" – 3:51

== Charts ==
Chart performance for Engineering the Soul
Chart (2008)	Peak position
Australian Albums (ARIA)	20
