= The Barnicles & Stripes EP =

The Barnicles & Stripes E.p.

EP by Something with Numbers
- Released: September 9, 2002
- Genres: Punk, Rock, Soul
- Label: Below Par

Something with Numbers chronology
The Barnicles & Stripes E.p. (2002)	Etiquette (2004)

The Barnicles & Stripes is the debut EP by Australian punk rock band Something with Numbers. It was released through Below Par Records in 2002. Its title is notable for being spelled incorrectly ('Barnicles' should be 'Barnacles').

== Track listing ==
1. "Denenenenenena"
2. "We Can Succeed"
3. "What I Believe"
4. "Barnicles and Stripes"
5. "Wednesday"
6. "Perfect Match"
