= Below Par Records =

Australian independent record label

- Founded: 2000
- Founder: Jai Al-Attas; Mark Catanzariti; Steven Chalker
- Distributor: Virgin/EMI
- Genre: various
- Country of origin: Australia
- Location: Darlinghurst, New South Wales
- Official website: Below Par Records website

Below Par Records is an Australian independent record label established in 2000 by three sixteen-year-old Sydney high-school students, Jai Al-Attas, Mark Catanzariti and Steven Chalker.

In 2001, Matt Hawkes replaced Steven Chalker as the third partner. Below Par Records won the Nescafe Big Break competition in 2002 and, in 2003, Below Par Records went into a label development deal with Eleven owned by John Watson and Melissa Chenery. In 2005 Below Par Records started an imprint called OK!Relax in which they released records by The Scare and Die!Die!Die!. Today, Below Par Records is home to gold-selling artist Kisschasy as well as Something With Numbers, The Scare and Teenage Fairytale Dropouts. Below Par Records is distributed by Virgin/EMI in Australia and New Zealand.

== Current and former signings ==
- The Colour
- Die!Die!Die!
- For Amusement Only
- In the Grey
- Jim Ward
- Kisschasy
- Last Years Hero
- The Living End
- MC Lars
- The Scare
- Something With Numbers
- Vaux

== Discography ==
Cat. #	Artist	Title	Release date	Format	Other information
PAR01	Various Artists	Caddy of the Year	5 April 2001	CD	Compilation release.
PAR02	For Amusement Only	Where Did We Go Wrong?	1 February 2002	CD	EP release.
PAR03	Various Artists	Caddy of the Year 2	1 August 2002	CD	Compilation release.
PAR04	Something with Numbers	The Barnicles & Stripes E.p.	9 September 2002	CD	EP release.
PAR05	Last Years Hero	Start Over	7 October 2002	CD	EP release.
PAR06	Various Artists	Skunk #1	9 February 2003	CD	Compilation release.
PAR07	Yellowcard	The Underdog EP	5 May 2003	CD	EP release.
PAR08	For Amusement Only	One for the Team	12 May 2003	CD	EP release.
PAR09	Various Artists	Caddy of the Year 3	8 September 2003	CD	Compilation release.
PAR10	In the Grey	Wake the Silent Day	8 September 2003	CD	EP release.
PAR11DVD6	Kisschasy	Kisschasy: The Movie	September 2006	DVD	Video release.
PAR12	Brand New	Your Favourite Weapon	29 October 2003; 9 February 2004	CD+DVD	LP limited edition release.
PAR12	Brand New	Your Favourite Weapon	9 February 2004	CD	LP release.
PAR13	Kisschasy	Darkside / Stay Awake	1 March 2004	CD	EP release.
PAR14	Last Years Hero	Tell You When	5 April 2004	CD	LP release.
PAR15	Vaux	There Must Be Some Way to Stop Them	1 November 2004	CD	LP release.
PAR16	Something with Numbers	Etiquette	20 September 2004	CD	LP release.
PAR17	Various Artists	Caddy of the Year 4	18 October 2004	CD	Compilation release.
PAR18	The Colour	Is Out and About	11 October 2004	CD	EP release.
PAR19	Kisschasy	Cara Sposa	4 October 2004	CD	EP release.
PAR20	MC Lars	The Laptop EP	March 21, 2005	CD	EP release.
PAR21	The Matches	E. Von Dahl Killed the Locals	25 April 2005	CD	LP release.
PAR22	In the Grey	Innocence Is Running Out	24 July 2005	CD	LP release.
PAR24	Something with Numbers	Apple of the Eye (Lay Me Down)	9 September 2006	CD	Single release.
PAR25	Something with Numbers	Perfect Distraction	7 October 2006	CD	LP release.
PAR25SP	Something with Numbers	Perfect Distraction	7 October 2006	CD+DVD	LP limited edition release.
PAR27	The Scars	Bats! Bats! Bats!	21 June 2007	CD	EP release.
PAR28	Soft Tigers	Gospel Ambitions	20 October 2007	CD	LP release.
PAR30	The Scare	Chivalry	6 October 2007	CD	LP release.
PAR31	Soft Tigers	Mr Ice Cream	22 September 2007	CD	Single release.
PAR32	Jim Ward	Quiet	9 February 2008	CD	EP release.
PAR33	Kisschasy	Too B or Not Too B	10 May 2008	CD+DVD	Compilation release.
PAR34	Something with Numbers	Stay with Me Bright Eyes	19 July 2008	CD	Single release.
PAR35	Something with Numbers	Engineering the Soul	6 September 2008	CD	LP release.
PAR35SP	Something with Numbers	Engineering the Soul	6 September 2008	CD+DVD	LP limited edition release.
PAR111	Brand New	Deja Entendu	3 November 2003	CD	LP release.
PAR112	Kisschasy	Do-Do's & Whoa-Oh's	3 July 2005	CD	Single release.
PAR113	Kisschasy	United Paper People	31 July 2005	CD	LP release.
PAR113SP	Kisschasy	United Paper People	31 July 2005	2xCDs	LP limited edition release.
PAR114	Kisschasy	Face Without a Name	21 October 2005	CD	Single release.
PAR115SP	Kisschasy	The Shake	25 February 2006	CD+DVD	Single release.
PAR116	Kisschasy	Opinions Won't Keep You Warm at Night	9 June 2007	CD	Single release.
PAR116A	Kisschasy	Opinions Won't Keep You Warm at Night	9 June 2007	CD	Single limited edition release.
PAR116B	Kisschasy	Opinions Won't Keep You Warm at Night	9 June 2007	CD	Single limited edition release.
PAR116D	Kisschasy	Opinions Won't Keep You Warm at Night	9 June 2007	CD	Single limited edition release.
PAR116E	Kisschasy	Opinions Won't Keep You Warm at Night	9 June 2007	CD	Single limited edition release.
PAR117	Kisschasy	Hymns for the Nonbeliever	21 July 2007	CD	LP release.
PAR118	Kisschasy	Spray on Pants	10 November 2007	CD	Single release.
PARCDPRO113	Kisschasy	United Paper People	2005	CD	LP promo release.
PARPRO002	Kisschasy	This Bed	2006	CD	Single promo release.
PARPRO005	Kisschasy	Strings and Drums	2008	CD	Single promo release.
PARPRO006	Kisschasy	Ugly Birds In a Beautiful Cage	2008	CD	Single promo release.
PARPRO117	Kisschasy	Hymns for the Nonbeliever	2007	CD	LP promo release.

== See also ==
- List of record labels
