= The Scare (band) =

Australian punk rock band

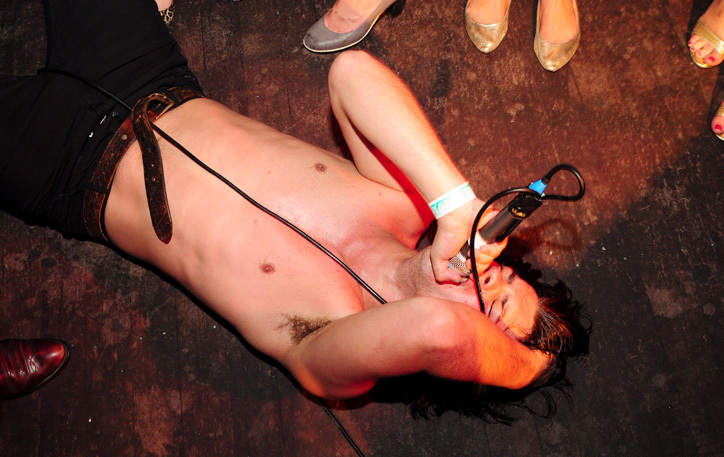

Background information
- Origin: Brisbane, Queensland, Australia
- Genres: Punk rock
- Years active: 2004-2010
- Labels: EMI, Dance to the Radio, Blowback, Below Par Records
- Past members: Kiss Reid; Samuel Pearton; Brock Alexander Fitzgerald; Liam O'Brien; Wade Keighran; Holiday Sidewinder; Kellie Alison; Trad Nathan; Sam Edwards; Ben Lewis

The Scare was an Australian punk rock band formed in 2004 by Kiss Reid, Ben Lewis, Samuel Pearton and Liam O'Brien in Brisbane, Queensland. They released their debut EP, Masochist Mimes, in November 2004. Brock Alexander Fitzgerald joined in 2005 and the band released a second EP, Vacuum Irony in October. Wade Keighran joined later in the year and in 2006 the band relocated to Birmingham.

They returned to Australia to record their first album before returning to the UK to tour. Their debut album, Chivalry, was released in 2007. This was followed up by the Daniel Johns produced Oozevoodoo in September 2009. The band has toured in Australia, UK and USA and have had national rotation on Triple J. The band broke up in 2010, playing their last gig on 9 August in Fortitude Valley QLD.

== Discography ==
=== Albums ===
List of albums, with selected details and chart positions
Title	Details	Peak chart positions
Title	Details	AUS
Chivalry	Released: 2007; Label: Below Par; Format: CD, digital	—
Oozevoodoo	Released: 4 September 2009; Label: Below Par; Format: CD, digital	81

=== Extended plays ===
- Masochist Mimes (November 2004)
- Vacuum Irony (October 2005)

=== Singles ===
- "Bats! Bats! Bats!" - Dance to the Radio (DTTR031) (7 May 2007)
