= Something with Numbers =

Rock band based in Australia

- Origin: Central Coast, New South Wales, Australia
- Genres: Indie rock, alternative rock, pop rock
- Years active: 2001–2013
- Label: Below Par
- Past members: Tim Crocker; Jake Grigg; Trent Crawford; Scott Chapman; Dave McBeath; Lachlan West; Lachlan Scott

Something with Numbers were an Australian indie rock band formed on the New South Wales Central Coast in 2001. They released an EP and four studio albums in their 7-year career. Something with Numbers found commercial success in 2006, with the release of "Apple of the Eye (Lay Me Down)", which peaked at No. 34 on the ARIA Singles Chart, and placed No. 64 on the Triple J Hottest 100, 2006.

== History ==
=== 2001–2005: Early history and first releases ===
Something with Numbers formed in 2001, coming out of the Central Coast punk scene in New South Wales. The name of the band derived from a friend's suggestion that the band's name should be "something with numbers" (meant in the vein of blink-182 or Sum 41). The band soon signed to small indie label Below Par Records, and worked towards releasing their first EP, The Barnicles & Stripes, in 2002. Two years later, in 2004, Something with Numbers released their debut album, Etiquette.

=== 2006–2007: Perfect Distraction ===
The band continued to develop their sound and in 2006 they made their commercial breakthrough, with the release of their second studio album Perfect Distraction in October of that year. Their Goodbye Mickey Finn tour saw them play around the country with up-and-coming bands The Inches and The Lazys. The album featured a range of styles and genres, touching on soul rock and their usual punk rock sound. It featured three singles. "Apple of the Eye (Lay Me Down)" peaked at No. 34 on the ARIA Singles Chart, and placed No. 64 on the Triple J Hottest 100, 2006. The second single from the album was "Chase the Chaser", which failed to reach the ARIA Singles Chart; however, it did receive airplay on Australian music network, Channel V. Something with Numbers played at the Sydney Big Day Out on 25 January 2007. Channel V described the show as having the "best mosh of the day". Other notable concert appearances for the band have been alongside Lagwagon, Good Charlotte, Millencolin, The Ataris, Amber Calling and Panic! at the Disco.

=== 2008–2010: Engineering the Soul ===
The band released their third album, Engineering the Soul, on 6 September 2008. They recorded the album over nine weeks in March and April, at Mission Sound Studios, Brooklyn, New York, in the United States. The album was produced by Tim O'Heir. The first single off the new album was "Stay With Me Bright Eyes", which reached No. 48 in the Triple J Hottest 100, 2008. A music video was created for the song.

On 14 September 2008, Engineering the Soul debuted at number 20 on the ARIA Albums Chart.

=== 2011–present: Maniac + 2011 ===
In February 2011, Something with Numbers revealed that they were writing for their fourth record. The band's line-up changed for the first time with the departure of both Dave McBeath and Lachlan Scott, who were replaced by The Griswolds' Lachlan West and One Dollar Short's Trent Crawford, respectively. In an interview with rock journalist Nick Milligan in August 2011, Grigg said of their fourth record: "I really want to make a heavy, catchy album. I don't particularly listen to heavy music anymore, but I enjoy playing it live. I want to write some energetic, heavy music that you can sing along to." They then performed at the Coaster festival in Gosford that September.In a post on their Facebook page, the band announced that the album would be released on May 10, 2013, and they would be going on tour to accompany the release. The band split up following the end of the tour.

Grigg would later find success as a chef, known as the "Air Fryer Guy".

== Members ==
Final line-up

- Jake Grigg – lead vocals (2001–2013), rhythm guitar (2011–2013)
- Tim Crocker – rhythm guitar (2001–2013)
- Scott Chapman – bass (2001–2013)
- Trent Crawford – lead guitar (2011–2013)
- Lachlan West – drums (2011–2013)

Former members

- Dave McBeath – drums (2001–2011)
- Lachlan Scott – lead guitar (2001–2011)

== Discography ==
=== Studio albums ===
| Title | Details | Peak chart positions |
| Title | Details | AUS |
|---|---|---|
| Etiquette | Released: September 2004; Label: Below Par (PAR 16); Format: CD | — |
| Perfect Distraction | Released: 7 October 2006; Label: Below Par (PAR 25); Format: CD, CD+DVD | 37 |
| Engineering the Soul | Released: 6 September 2008; Label: Below Par (PAR 35); Format: CD, CD+DVD | 20 |
| Eleven Eleven | Released: 10 May 2013; Label: Stop Start Music (SSM54); Format: CD | — |

=== EPs ===
| Title | Details |
|---|---|
| The Barnicles & Stripes EP | Released: September 2002; Label: Below Par (PAR 04); Format: CD |

=== Singles ===
| Year | Title | Peak chart positions | Album |
| Year | Title | AUS | Album |
|---|---|---|---|
| 2002 | "We Can Succeed" | — | The Barnicles & Stripes E.P. |
| 2004 | "On the Inside" | — | Etiquette |
| 2006 | "Apple of the Eye (Lay Me Down)" | 34 | Perfect Distraction |
| 2007 | "Chase the Chaser" | — | Perfect Distraction |
| 2007 | "Goodbye Mickey Finn" | — | Perfect Distraction |
| 2008 | "Stay with Me Bright Eyes" | 52 | Engineering the Soul |
| 2008 | "We'll Fight" | — | Engineering the Soul |
| 2008 | "89 Freedom Street" | — | Engineering the Soul |
| 2013 | "We Kill the Weekend" | — | Eleven Eleven |
| 2013 | "Wild One" | — | Eleven Eleven |

== Awards and nominations ==
=== ARIA Music Awards ===
The ARIA Music Awards is an annual awards ceremony that recognises excellence, innovation, and achievement across all genres of Australian music. They commenced in 1987.

| Year | Nominee / work | Award | Result | Ref. |
|---|---|---|---|---|
| 2007 | "Apple of the Eye (Lay Me Down)" | Breakthrough Artist - Single | Nominated | |
