= Seizures (album) =

Studio album by Kisschasy
- Released: 21 August 2009
- Recorded: 2009 at Sonora Recorders and Mant Studios, Los Angeles
- Genre: Pop rock, alternative rock
- Length: 31:16
- Label: Below Par
- Producer: Rob Schnapf

Kisschasy chronology
Too B or Not Too B (2008)	Seizures (2009)	The Terrors of Comfort (2026)

Professional ratings
Review scores
Source	Rating
Sputnikmusic	3/5 stars

Seizures is the third studio album by Australian rock band Kisschasy, released through Below Par Records on 21 August 2009. The album was recorded in Los Angeles with producer Rob Schnapf.

== Writing process ==
All the songs were written by singer and guitarist Darren Cordeux. "I set up a home studio in Feb 08 and basically wrote for a year straight. It was a bit of a down year for me so I decided to make a record about life as a 23 year-old. It's more honest and raw than I've ever been - where Hymns looked to a lot of outside sources for inspiration, this record is a lot more introspective - which is scary as hell! I got ripped off, pissed off, watched a lot of TV, drank myself into a stupor consistently and had a great time doing it. These are some of the things you can expect to hear on this record." He said that he got the idea for the name "Seizures" while reading. "I was reading a book by Dr Oliver Sacks called 'The Man Who Mistook His Wife For a Hat' and in one chapter he tells a story about a few patients who were either epileptic or stroke victims and every time they would seizure they'd remember things from their past that had long been forgotten. Some of these memories were quite painful but others were wonderful moments of music or love. The songs on this record are my versions of the seizures those patients experienced - they will always bring me back to a certain time in my life"

== Singles and promotion ==
This album was created by ENG 101-47 at QCC. Hooray! The album's first single, "Generation Why", was released to radio airplay and as a digital download on 7 July 2009. The song's music video was released onto YouTube prior to the single on 24 Jun 2009. It was posted on their MySpace page on the same day as the video was posted and released as a CD single on 3 July 2009. The song is said to be about "armchair philosophers who love to complain," according to songwriter Darren Cordeux, who also said, "The title kind of came after the song was written so its not exactly specific to 'my generation' but I do spend the most time with people around my own age so I guess it could be taken that way".

The album's second single, "Turnaround", was released to radio airplay and as a digital download in September 2009. The video was filmed at Darlinghurst Community Centre, Sydney and features a preacher-like person trying to sell snakeoil cures to the audience.

On 14 January 2010 it was announced on the band's website that the third single off the album would be "Dinosaur". The music video for premiered on 11 February on the Nova website. The video featured two animated dinosaurs. The video was created by Swinburne University student, Chris Scott Baker, who won the competition run by the band for Australian film animation students.

== Track listing ==
All tracks are written by Darren Cordeux.

No.	Title	Length
1.	"Seizures"	3:32
2.	"Generation Why"	2:43
3.	"Weekend"	2:43
4.	"Turnaround"	3:43
5.	"Let's Get Personal!"	2:49
6.	"Tarantula"	2:07
7.	"Strawberry Jam"	4:01
8.	"We All Need to Be Alone"	2:05
9.	"Alphamale"	2:06
10.	"Strange Stranger"	2:21
11.	"Dinosaur"	3:07

iTunes bonus tracks
No.	Title	Length
13.	"Hey Dancer"	2:46
14.	"Lungs" (demo)	4:00

DVD
No.	Title	Length
1.	"The Making of Seizures, a documentary"
2.	"Track by Track, an insight from the band"
3.	"Generation Why" (Behind the scene)
4.	"Generation Why" (Music video)

== Personnel ==
=== Band ===
- Joel Vanderuit – bass
- Karl Ammitzboll – drums, percussion
- Sean Thomas – guitar
- Darren Cordeux – lead vocals, guitar

=== Additional musicians ===
- Rob Schnapf – additional keys, guitars and vocals
- The Steel Train Choir – gang vocals on "Turnaround"

=== Production ===
- Rob Schnapf – producer, mixing engineer
- Doug Boehm – mixing engineer, audio engineer
- Zack Carper – additional engineering, assistant at Mant Studios
- Alan Yoshida – mastering at Oceanway Mastering
- Chris Constable – assistant at Sonora Recorders
- John Oreshnick – drum technician

=== Artwork ===
- Simon Ozolins – photography
- Mathematics – art direction, design

== Charts ==
Chart (2009)	Peak position
Australian Albums (ARIA)	15
