= Die!Die!Die! (comics) =

Publication information
- Publisher: Image Comics
- Format: Ongoing series
- Genre: Action thriller
- Publication date: July 11, 2018 – March 24, 2021
- No. of issues: 14

Creative team
- Created by: Robert Kirkman, Scott M. Gimple
- Written by: Robert Kirkman, Scott M. Gimple
- Artist: Chris Burnham
- Colorist: Nathan Fairbairn

Die!Die!Die! is an American comic book series created by writers Robert Kirman and Scott M. Gimple, and artists Chris Burnham and Nathan Fairbairn. It debuted in 2018 by Image Comics with a run of 14 issues and 2 volumes.

== Overview ==
Die!Die!Die! is a violent, action focused thriller centering Connie Lipshitz, a senator within the U.S. government who manipulates political affairs to assassinate those deemed a threat to society, or her power. She does this using a number of elite operatives at her disposal.

At the review site Comic Book Roundup, the series has a user rating of 7.9 and a critic rating of 7.1 out of 10. However, League of Comic Geeks maintains its rating at 3.9 out of 5.

== Issues ==
Issue	Publication Da
Die!Die!Die! #1	July 11, 2018
Die!Die!Die! #2	August 22, 2018
Die!Die!Die! #3	October 3, 2018
Die!Die!Die! #4	October 24, 2018
Die!Die!Die! #5	November 28, 2018
Die!Die!Die! #6	December 26, 2018
Die!Die!Die! #7	January 23, 2019
Die!Die!Die! #8	February 27, 2019
Die!Die!Die! #9	March 18, 2020
Die!Die!Die! #10	June 10, 2020
Die!Die!Die! #11	July 15, 2020
Die!Die!Die! #12	August 19, 2020
Die!Die!Die! #13	November 18, 2020
Die!Die!Die! #14	March 24, 2021

== Collected Editions ==
Title	Material Collected	Publication Date	ISBN
Die!Die!Die!, Vol 1. TP	Die!Die!Die! #1–8	July 17, 2019	978-1534312142
Die!Die!Die!, Vol 2. TP	Die!Die!Die! #9–14	April 21, 2021	978-1534317079
Die!Die!Die! Deluxe HC, Vol. 1	Die!Die!Die! #1–14	August 20, 2025	978-1534328716
