= OK!Relax =

OK!Relax is an imprint label of Below Par Records. It was created in 2005 and so far has released records by Die! Die! Die! and The Scare.

== See also ==
- Lists of record labels
