= United Paper People =

Studio album by Kisschasy
- Released: 31 July 2005
- Recorded: Megaphone Studios, Sydney, Australia
- Genre: Alternative rock
- Length: 42:06
- Label: Below Par; Eleven
- Producer: Phil McKellar

Kisschasy chronology
| Fire in the Breeze (2004) | United Paper People (2005) | Hymns for the Nonbeliever (2007) |

Singles from United Paper People
- 1. "Do-Do's & Whoa-Oh's" Released: 4 July 2005; 2. "Face Without a Name" Released: 24 September 2005; 3. "The Shake" Released: 27 February 2006

Professional ratings
Review scores
| Source | Rating |
|---|---|
| Sputnikmusic | 3/5 stars |

United Paper People is the debut album by the Australian band Kisschasy, released on 31 July 2005.

== Track listing ==
All lyrics are written by Darren Cordeux; all music is composed by Kisschasy.

| No. | Title | Length |
|---|---|---|
| 1. | "Do-Do's & Whoa-Oh's" | 3:33 |
| 2. | "With Friends Like You, Who Needs Friends?" | 2:53 |
| 3. | "Morning" | 2:20 |
| 4. | "This Bed" | 4:11 |
| 5. | "Hearing Voices Tonight" | 3:09 |
| 6. | "Interlude" | 2:31 |
| 7. | "Water on a Stove" | 3:23 |
| 8. | "The Shake" | 4:03 |
| 9. | "Face Without a Name" | 3:07 |
| 10. | "United Paper People" | 2:24 |
| 11. | "Ione Skye" | 2:55 |
| 12. | "What We Become" | 3:04 |
| 13. | "Black Dress" | 4:39 |
| Total length: | | 42:06 |

Japanese bonus tracks
| No. | Title | Producer | Length |
|---|---|---|---|
| 14. | "Resolution Wednesday" | Kisschasy | 2:53 |
| 15. | "Doomsday" | Kisschasy | 3:29 |
| Total length: | | | 48:29 |

Limited edition bonus disc
| No. | Title | Producer | Length |
|---|---|---|---|
| 1. | "Reminder" (Acoustic) | | 3:05 |
| 2. | "Stay Awake" (Acoustic) | Sam Panetta | 3:18 |
| 3. | "The Way They Walk" (Acoustic) | | 3:34 |
| 4. | "Love Affair with Distance" (Acoustic) | | 3:04 |
| Total length: | | | 12:59 |

== Charts ==
| Chart (2005) | Peak position |
|---|---|
| Australian Albums Chart | 15 |

== Release history ==
| Region | Date | Edition(s) | Format(s) | Label(s) | Catalogue |
|---|---|---|---|---|---|
| Australia | 31 July 2005 | Standard; limited | CD | Below Par; Eleven | PAR114; PAR114SP |
| Various | 1 August 2005 | Standard | Digital download | Below Par; Eleven | – |
| Japan | 7 December 2005 | Standard | CD | Pyropit; Below Par | PTCG-1021 |
| Australia | October 2022 | limited | LP | Summit Distro | SD-019 |
