= Modest Fok =

American R&B band

Modest Fok was a R&B band that was created in Atlanta, Georgia, in 1980 by Debra Killings, James Killings Jr, and William "Vybe Chyle" Burke. The band was previously known as Princess & Starbreeze was signed to Eastwest Records in the 1990s. Their debut album Love or the Single Life was released in 1992 and scored two minor R&B hits on the Billboard Hot R&B/Hip-Hop Singles & Tracks chart.

The band made their debut on the Billboard charts on July 11, 1992, when "Promise Me" entered the R&B chart at number 99.

== Discography ==
=== Albums ===
Album information
Love or the Single Life
- Released: 1992
- Chart Peak: n/a
- Last RIAA Description: n/a
- Singles: "Love Or The Single Life ", "Promise Me"
- Worldwide sales: n/a

=== Singles ===
Year	Title	Album	US
1992	"Love or the Single Life"	Love or the Single Life	37
1992	"Promise Me"	Love or the Single Life	76

== Band members ==
Current members

- Debra Killings – lead vocals, bass guitar, lead guitar, Keyboards (1980–present)
- James Killings Jr – musical director, backing vocals, lead vocals, bass guitar, lead guitar, Keyboards (1980–present)
- Wesley B Allen – keyboards, lead vocals, backing vocals (1982–present)
- Kenneth Wright – keyboards, backing vocals (1985–present)
- Donald Lee Simpson – lead vocals (1984–present)
- Carol E Killings - Artist Management
- Carol "Dee Dee" Killings - Hair Stylist

Former members

- William "Vybe Chyle" Burke – drums, programming, production manager, talent agent (1980–1990)
- Alvin J Speights - audio engineer (1984–1990)
- Monyea Z Crawford - lighting director, crew chief (1984–1990)
- Geno Jordan - Road Manager
- Larry Wimby - Lead vocals, backing vocals, trombone, choreographer, stylist
- Thomas "Butch" Harris – lead vocals (1980–1984)
- Marty Heyward – sax, keyboards, musical director (1980–1983)
- Jerome Dukes - trombone, backing vocals
- Rory Core - trumpet, trombone, backing vocals
- Vernon Maddox - trumpet, trombone, backing vocals
- Derrick Cleveland - trumpet, backing vocals
- Max Spalding - keyboards, guitar, lead vocals, backing vocals
