= Locust Weeks =

Locust Weeks (EP)

EP by Die! Die! Die!
- Released: 2006
- Genre: Punk rock
- Length: 9:54
- Label: Tardus Music

Locust Weeks is the 2006 EP by New Zealand-based punk rock trio Die! Die! Die!.

It was recorded, mixed, mastered and co-produced by Kevin McMahon at Marcata Studios in New York on 13 August 2006.

This four-track EP was released in 2006 in New Zealand by Tardus Music.

All four tracks were added to the UK release of Die! Die! Die!'s debut album, when it was released by Pet Piranha Records in 2007.

== Track listing ==
1. I Wanna - 2:53
2. Dropp Off - 2:26
3. Untitled - 0:55
4. 155 - 3:40
