= Promise Emmanuel =

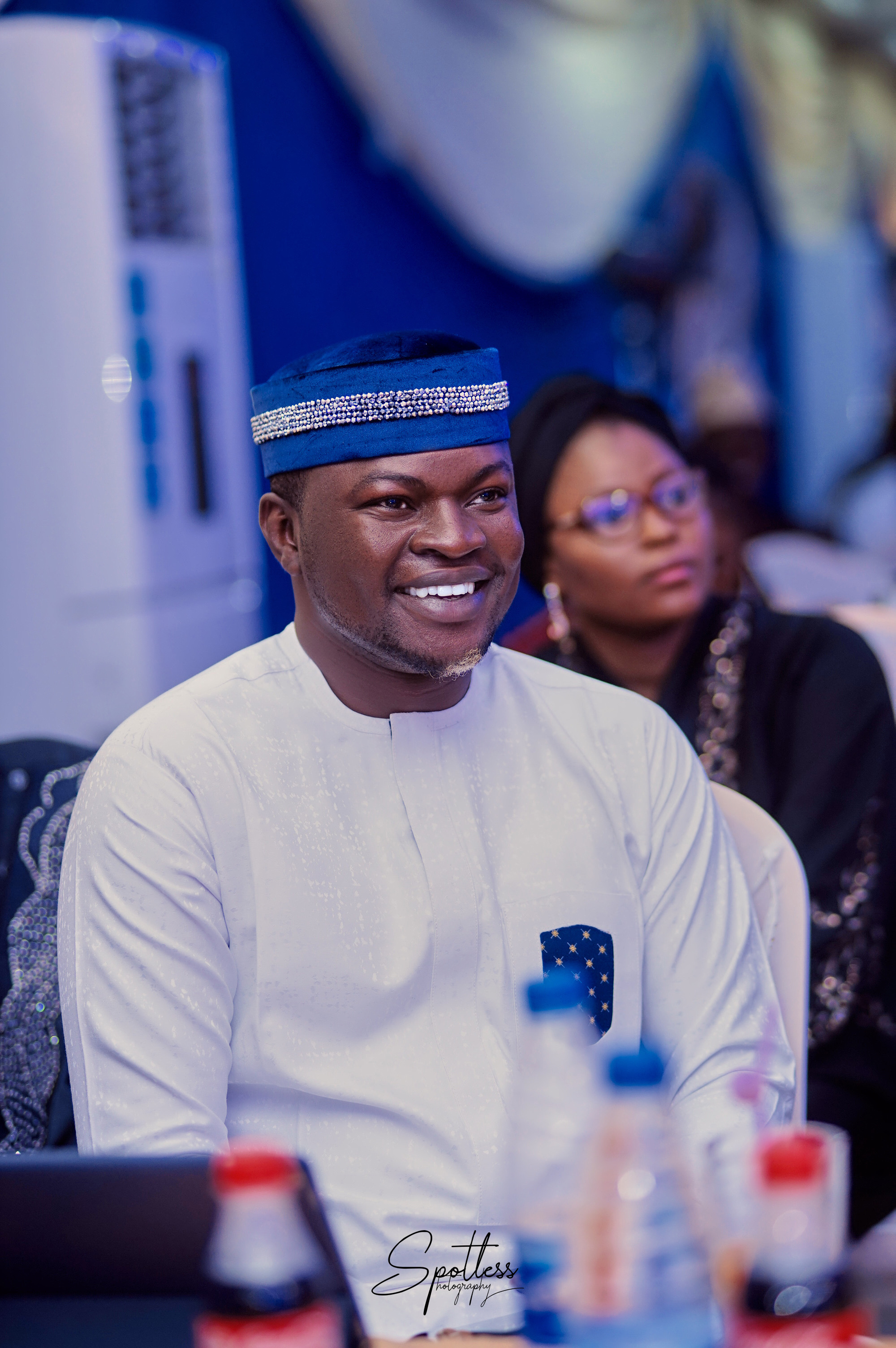

Promise Emmanuel, also known as Kogi Rebel, hails from Igah in Olamaboro local government of Kogi State.

He holds a degree in mass communication from the Kogi State University, Anyigba. He is a media psychologist with interests in solution articles, social research and political media strategy focusing on new media.

== Career ==
Emmanuel was appointed as the chief press secretary to the deputy governor of Kogi State, Edward David Onoja in October 2019.

He earns from writing and research. He has worked as an OAP (on-air personality), head of media, African Development Studies Center, front desk officer, Resource intermediaries Limited, admin officer, Keystone Bank, office assistant, Maersk Shipping Coy. He also freelances for many Nigerian national newspapers.
