= Die! Die! Die! (album) =

Studio album by Die! Die! Die!
- Released: 2006
- Genre: Punk rock
- Length: 21:51
- Labels: OK!Relax / Inertia Distribution; Capital Recordings
- Producer: Steve Albini

Die! Die! Die! is the debut studio album by New Zealand punk rock band Die! Die! Die!.

It was recorded and mixed in Chicago at Electrical Audio by Steve Albini between 21 and 24 March 2005. It was mastered by Steve Rooke at Abbey Road Studios on 16 June 2005.

It was released on 22 January 2006 on OK!Relax / Inertia Distribution in Australia and by Capital Recordings in New Zealand.

The album was released in the UK in 2007 by Pet Piranha Records with 4 extra tracks, taken from the Locust Weeks EP.

== Reception ==
In an AllMusic review, Stewart Mason described the album as drawing on the late-1970s no wave sound of bands such as Mars and DNA. He praised the contrast between Andrew Wilson's abrasive vocals and guitar playing and the tight rhythm section of bassist Henry Oliver and drummer Michael Prain, which he compared to Gang of Four and the Au Pairs. Mason also highlighted Steve Albini's raw, live-sounding production, noting that the combination made the album accessible despite its abrasive sound.

== Track listing ==
1. "Like 48th St, Maybe?" – 1:02
2. "Disappear Here" – 1:45
3. "Franz (17 Die! Die! Die! Fans Can't Be Wrong)" – 1:39
4. "Auckland Is Burning" – 3:14
5. "Everybody's Got Something to Hide Except For Me and My Mikey" – 3:00
6. "Ashtray! Ashtray!" – 2:49
7. "Year Nine, Yeah!" – 2:19
8. "L.A Bones" – 1:19
9. "Shyness Will Get You Nowhere" – 2:15
10. "'Out of the Blue'" – 2:29
