= A Promise =

A Promise may refer to:

- A Promise (1986 film), a Japanese drama by Yoshishige Yoshida
- A Promise (1998 film), a South Korean film starring Park Shin-yang
- A Promise, a 2002 film starring Gordon Pinsent
- A Promise (2013 film), an English-language French romance by Patrice Leconte
- A Promise (Miriam Makeba album), 1974
- A Promise (Xiu Xiu album), 2003
- "A Promise" (song), 1981, by Echo & the Bunnymen

== See also ==
- A Promise to Burn, a 2010 album by Framing Hanley
- Promise (disambiguation)
- The Promise (disambiguation)
- Promises, Promises (disambiguation)
