= Face Without a Name =

2005 single by Kisschasy

Single by Kisschasy

from the album United Paper People
- B-side: "This Bed"; "Hearing Voices Tonight"
- Released: 24 October 2005
- Recorded: Megaphone (Sydney, Australia)
- Length: 2:58
- Label: Below Par; Eleven: A Music Company; Virgin
- Songwriters: Karl Ammitzboll; Darren Cordeux; Sean Thomas; Joel Vanderuit
- Producer: Phil McKellar

Kisschasy singles chronology
"Do-Do's & Whoa-Oh's" (2005)	"Face Without a Name" (2005)	"The Shake" (2006)

"Face Without a Name" is a song by Australian rock group Kisschasy, released as the second single from their debut album, United Paper People (2005). It was released on 24 October 2005 and peaked at number 41 in Australia.

== Music video ==
The music video featured the camera panning across an orange background while the band performed. The video also featured various fans acting as extras for the shoot.

== Track listing ==
All lyrics are written by Darren Cordeux; all music is composed by Kisschasy.

Australian CD EP
No.	Title	Length
1.	"Face Without a Name"	2:58
2.	"This Bed" (live)	4:25
3.	"Hearing Voices Tonight" (live)	3:01
4.	"Do-Do's & Whoa-Oh's" (live)	3:41
Total length:		14:04

== Charts ==
Chart (2005)	Peak position
Australia (ARIA)	41

== Release history ==
Region	Date	Label	Format	Catalogue	Ref(s).
Australia	24 October 2005	Below Par; Eleven: A Music Company; Virgin	CD EP	PAR114	
