= The Shake (Kisschasy song) =

2006 single by Kisschasy

Single by Kisschasy

from the album United Paper People
- B-side: "It's Getting Easier to Die"; "The Boat"
- Released: 27 February 2006
- Studio: Megaphone (Sydney, Australia)
- Length: 4:03
- Label: Below Par; Eleven: A Music Company; Virgin
- Songwriters: Karl Ammitzboll; Darren Cordeux; Sean Thomas; Joel Vanderuit
- Producer: Phil McKellar

Kisschasy singles chronology
"Face Without a Name" (2005)	"The Shake" (2006)	"Opinions Won't Keep You Warm at Night" (2007)

"The Shake" is the third single released from Australian rock band Kisschasy's debut album, United Paper People (2005). It was released on 27 February 2006 and charted at No. 25 in Australia.

== Track listing ==
All lyrics are written by Darren Cordeux; all music is composed by Kisschasy.

No.	Title	Length
1.	"The Shake"	4:03
2.	"It's Getting Easier to Die"	4:04
3.	"The Boat"	3:29
Total length:		11:35

Bonus DVD
No.	Title	Length
1.	"Documentary"	9:42

== Charts ==
Chart (2006)	Peak position
Australia (ARIA)	25
