= Die! Die! Die! =

New Zealand punk rock band

- Origin: New Zealand
- Genres: Punk rock; post-punk revival; noise pop
- Years active: 2003–present
- Labels: OK!Relax; Etch N Sketch; Capital Recordings; SAF Records; Tardus Music; Inertia Distribution; Smalltown America; RedEye Distribution; Flying Nun Records
- Members: Andrew Wilson; Michael Prain; Lachlan Anderson
- Past members: Michael Logie; Henry Oliver; Kane Goulter; Rory Attwell

Die! Die! Die! (sometimes styled Die!Die!Die!) is a three-piece New Zealand noise pop/punk/post-punk band. Formed in late 2003, the band has released seven albums, all backed with extensive international touring. A number of different bass guitarists have played alongside the permanent members, Andrew Wilson (guitar, vocals) and Michael Prain (drums). Lachlan Anderson's second spell with the band began in 2018.

== History ==
=== The Drummer Smells Nice, Carriage H and Rawer (1999–2004) ===
While at Logan Park High School in Dunedin, Wilson and Prain were three-time Pepsismokefree Rockquest entrants – in 1999 with The Drummer Smells Nice, then twice with Carriage H. They won the national competition in 2001. With Wilson playing bass guitar, Prain on drums and the guitarist/vocalist Tim "Tiddy" Smith, Carriage H released one EP, Power of Grey Skull, in 2002 and disbanded shortly afterwards.

Along with bass guitarist Ricky French, Wilson (who began playing guitar for the first time) and Prain then formed a short-lived Wellington-based group called Rawer. Henry Oliver, who later became Die! Die! Die!'s second bass guitarist, saw Rawer perform and recalled the sound as "a sea of pedals and effects". Only one Rawer recording, Dominion Road Noise Control, has ever been released (and not until 2026). In 2003, Wilson and Prain moved again, to Auckland. There they were inspired by the local music scene to form Die! Die! Die! together with Kane Goulter on bass guitar.

Writing in 2018, Oliver recalled being in the crowd at a Die! Die! Die! gig in summer 2003–2004. "It was meant to be their last show," and after the apparent disbanding of Die! Die! Die!, Wilson, Prain and Oliver (who had been a member of So To Speak) started a new band – the latter pulling out of a Masters in Cultural Studies course to do so. Initially Wilson and Oliver both played guitar, but the latter ended up as bass guitarist.

"We immediately started practising four or five times a week and soon decided to continue the name Die! Die! Die!. I always liked the name, people already knew the band, and they had recently received NZ On Air funding for a single which was still to be released, so, why start at the bottom of the hill again?" – Henry Oliver, 2018

=== First tours and the Die! Die! Die! EP and album (2004 – early 2006) ===
Within weeks of this new incarnation of Die! Die! Die! forming, the band began touring. At first they performed four dates around the North Island, then a national tour followed before they travelled to Australia. "We existed in a constant state of momentum" and within two years had also taken in the UK, Europe, and the USA.

Oliver recalled that, "we played shows in every town in the country that would have us and eventually, tiny clubs and dive bars around the world. The band wasn’t lazy, daydreamy or unreliable. From the beginning, we practised at least four days a week when we weren’t on tour. When we were, we did it relentlessly, playing everywhere we could, as many times as we could. Unlike other bands I’d been in, it wasn’t a hobby. It was fun, but it wasn’t for fun. It wasn’t a job because it didn’t pay. It was a vocation."

Recorded releases quickly followed the formation of this touring trio, starting with their first EP, Die! Die! Die! in 2005. A debut, self-titled album was recorded the same year, during the band's first trip to the US, at Electrical Audio in Chicago with Steve Albini, whom the band met through fellow Dunedinites HDU, producing. Wilson later recalled that "we did the first album in two days". It was released in New Zealand in January 2006. An international release followed soon after (including North America on SAF Records).

=== Locust Weeks (2006) ===
In 2006 a second EP, Locust Weeks, followed. It was co-produced by Kevin S. McMahon at Marcata Recording in New Paltz, New York. All four tracks of Locust Weeks were added into the British release of the album Die! Die! Die!, on Pet Piranha Records.

Die! Die! Die! returned to the United States for a tour that included the 2006 edition of the Austin, Texas, South By Southwest festival, where they played "the last slot of the night on the closing night of the festival". "The Austin Chronicle warned that you would lose all indie street cred if you missed them play, and influential UK industry mag MusicWeek ended up picking them as one of their ten highlights of SXSW."

Soon after South By Southwest, and fuelled at least in part by connections made at that festival, the band toured with Wolfmother and played in the UK, mainland Europe, and Japan. Oliver, writing in 2016, said, "At the time, Die! Die! Die! existed on a kind of low-budget neverending tour. We'd leave New Zealand for as long as possible, play as many shows we could get in a row and then decamp somewhere until we booked another bunch of shows." He left the band during a month-long break from touring in 2006, going on to law school and eventually becoming a journalist. He was replaced in the band by the Australian Lachlan Anderson.

=== Part Time Punks and Promises, Promises (2007–2008) ===
On 8 April 2007, Die! Die! Die! played a show at the Echo in Los Angeles. The resulting six-track live recording, Part Time Punks, included two songs from the Die! Die! Die! album and one from Locust Weeks. The closing track, "Blue Skies", (which dates back to Oliver's time with the band) had not been released before, but a studio version did appear as the final track of Promises, Promises later in the year.

Over the European summer, a reunited Slint toured Europe with Die! Die! Die! in support.

Promises, Promises was the band's second full-length album. Returning to work in New Paltz, New York the album was recorded, and mixed by Kevin S. McMahon at his Marcata Recording in sessions that Wilson later described as "ten days in a barn". Shayne Carter (Straitjacket Fits, Dimmer) was invited to produce the record by Die! Die! Die!, the first time he played that role for another band.

New Zealand saw an October 2007 release for the album, followed by releases around the world (February 2008 in the US). The album saw the band move away from the more hardcore tendencies of their first record towards a more bass- and drum-heavy sound – partly due to the influence of the new bass guitarist Lachlan Anderson, but also because a broken hand limited Wilson's guitar-playing. Carter had seen the band at SXSW and said, "Andrew had his broken hand at that point and I said to him, bro you should use that as a weapon, you know? Just make it more minimalist." When he was brought on as producer later, he wanted to remove "bells and whistles" and keep the sound minimalist.

In a four-star NME review, Camilla Pia wrote that Promises Promises "is all squeals and yelps, tornado riffs and frantic battered drums – and if that's not enough for you, it's emotional, danceable and catchy to boot". The Guardian, calling Die! Die! Die! "a peculiarly lip-smacking band", also gave four stars.

=== Form (2009–10) ===
After touring for almost three years worldwide, the band began working on a third album in Dunedin. After writing and rehearsing, mainly at Chicks Hotel in Port Chalmers, they recorded Form over nine days in Auckland with producer Nick Roughan (Skeptics) in August 2009. It was their first album recorded in New Zealand. In April 2010 Wilson said that Form was "finished...in November", although it wasn't released for another half a year.

Even while Form was in production and work had begun on its successor, Die! Die! Die! kept touring. What seemed to the band like a reduced schedule for 2009–10 was summarised as:

"We haven’t done much touring this year. Last year we only did about three tours or so. We did one two-month European tour and one month in Europe. We did a couple of New Zealand tours and I think we only went to Australia twice last year. I think we only played Brisbane once and that was with Wolfmother." – Andrew Wilson, April 2010

Form was released in July 2010 during a 13-date tour of New Zealand, then shows in Australia, UK, Europe, and USA followed. Wilson called it "dense sounding".

It debuted at number 1 on New Zealand's independent charts and number 19 on the National Album charts. The New Zealand Herald gave it a 5/5 rating and called it "certainly their best lot of songs to date". Under The Radar judged it "one of the most exciting albums of the year." In 2011 Form received New Zealand Music Award nominations for Best Alternative Album and Best Producer, and a Taite Music Prize nomination.

Die! Die! Die! had signed with a "re-emerging" Flying Nun Records in 2010, the year after founder Roger Shepherd (with help from others) regained control by buying the label from Warner Music. Form was only the second album on the newly independent label, and Die! Die! Die!'s only release on it.

By the time these nominations were received, work had begun on Die! Die! Die!'s next album. Before their next release the band abandoned these early songs and sessions, recorded something almost entirely different, disbanded, lost another bass guitarist, left Flying Nun, and found a new manager.

=== Hiatus and Harmony (2010–2013) ===
Recording sessions for the band's next album had begun before Form was even released. In April 2010 Wilson had said "we’ve pretty much got a whole good chunk of almost another album done", but nothing from these sessions was ever released.

Harmony began to take shape in five days in May 2011 (during a European tour in support of Form), when Die! Die! Die! and producer Chris Townsend completed most of the recording at Black Box, a studio on a French farm. In this new setting, and with Townsend a new contributor, "they threw out most of what they'd planned to record and came up with a whole lot of new material." Two more days of recording happened in Auckland in July shortly before "the band disintegrated".

Some of their last shows together were their first in China. After an "amazing...but really gruelling" tour, Anderson left the band and moved to Melbourne. Prain and Wilson also needed a break, which ended up lasting nine months.

"Having been touring almost non-stop for six years when they returned to NZ in June [2011], despite having an album's worth of songs under their belt, they thought Die!Die!Die! was finished. Anderson wanted to move to Melbourne, and Prain and Wilson were sick of each other too."
- New Zealand Herald, 12 July 2012

As well as being under personal pressure ("We were so close, and it gets to the point where you just need a break. And we all wanted new things from our lives,") the band were unhappy with their Flying Nun contract. With no band and Harmony still not released, Wilson stepped away from full-time musicianship. He took a job to pay debt, and Die! Die! Die! considered themselves finished. They cancelled shows in 2011, including what would have their first appearance in Russia.

During this hiatus, Wilson met bFM station manager Manu Taylor, who became the band's manager and encouraged Wilson to return to the Harmony recordings.

"The band was sick of each other and ended. I finished Harmony on my own and there was no DDD for nine months. I didn’t know if I could be bothered releasing an album with no band. Then Manu Taylor put the pieces back together". – Andrew Wilson, AudioCulture interview

Wilson, working without a band, took a different approach to Harmony than Die! Die! Die!'s previous albums.

"Harmony, that was when the band wasn’t really around. I was just working on my own with different people. I recorded the vocals with Shayne Carter in Dunedin and then re-recorded the vocals in Tasmania and then Chris Townsend, who mastered this album, he really encouraged…not my indulgence, but encouraged what I was doing on guitar in particular. And I think that worked really well." – Andrew Wilson, 2018

When Die! Die! Die! reformed in early 2012, Michael Logie (The Mint Chicks, F in Math), whom the band had already known for years, became the new bass guitarist. He joined only ten days before playing his first live show. Wilson said that "Manu, our band manager and good friend, he booked us for some shows and then told us he'd booked them."

The fourth album, Harmony, finally came out in New Zealand in August 2012 on the band's own label, Records Etcetera. They played live shows, including a support slot for The Smashing Pumpkins at Auckland's Vector Arena, that month. A UK release followed in March 2013. Rolling Stone and the New Zealand Herald both gave Harmony four stars.

The band played its fourth South By Southwest festival in 2013, as part of what Wilson described to the national broadcaster Radio New Zealand as "a pretty filthy tour, pretty full on" with pre-festival shows in Los Angeles, Las Vegas and San Antonio.

=== S W I M (2014–2015) ===
S W I M (short for "Someone Who Isn't Me") was released in August 2014. Recording of the album was split across Auckland and London, and it was mixed in Tasmania. Like Harmony, it was produced by Chris Townsend. A heavy touring schedule followed, including three trips to Europe in a year.

In 2015 the band broke up for about six months:

"We had been doing this for quite a long time, and you get in a holding pattern. Sometimes the music is not really enough, and you are too close to it to realise that you are not really enjoying it at all. It is also the nature when you are doing it more as a business than as enjoyment." – Andrew Wilson, Die! Die! Die!

=== What Did You Expect and Charm. Offensive. (2016–2018) ===
"And through it all, the constant is Andrew and Mikey, two high school friends that have been making music together for nearly 20 years – an amazing feat for any act, let alone a band that has thrived on instability, uncertainty and unpredictability." – Henry Oliver, bass guitarist (2004–06), 2018.

Bass guitarist Mike Logie had reunited with his former Mint Chicks bandmate Kody Nielson in new band Opossum, so when Wilson and Prain decided to start playing together again they recruited Rory Attwell into the reformed Die! Die! Die!. Attwell was one half of the team behind Lightship95, a recording studio on a boat moored in the Thames, where in 2015 the band recorded five tracks in a single day (with Attwell producing). They were released as an EP, What Did You Expect.

Die! Die! Die! and Attwell's history dated back to 2009, when Attwell's band KASMs were a UK support act. Their previous recording sessions included Form demos as well as work on Harmony and parts of S W I M. He remained UK-based, unlike the other two members, so there were only short windows of time during which all three members could get together to record.

"It’s changed with Rory, because we never planned to do another record. [...] We had a bit of a break, got offered a couple of shows, did those, and then Rory’s always been a recording engineer and producer so that was a really good asset for us to be able to set up anywhere and do anything. We just started getting a few songs together each time we played." – Mikie Prain, 2018

In the latter half of 2016, at sessions that were originally intended as rehearsals for upcoming shows, the trio recorded the bulk of their sixth album, Charm. Offensive., at Lightship95 with Attwell both playing bass and producing. They finished the year with shows in China (including the Concrete and Grass festival), Europe, and the UK before returning to New Zealand for a 10-date summer tour. Another week's recording took place in Dunedin, and the final vocal and guitar parts were recorded at SpaceMonster in Whanganui the morning before a show in Wellington.

Charm. Offensive. missed a May release date 2017, and was preceded by a single, "How Soon Is Too Soon (It's Not Vintage, It's Used)", in July. In September, Die! Die! Die! played at the China Hardcore Music Festival in Wuhan and the album came out in October. A tour of New Zealand followed.

Reflecting on the album's lyrics, Wilson said, "I have struggled a lot with my mental health over the years so I would be lying if I said that didn’t play a huge part in the making of this record. This album really was a mix of some of the best times of my life and some of the worst." In terms of musical style, Martin Pepperell wrote for Noisey (Vice) that the eclectic album is "a stylistic conversation between post-punk, noise pop, shoegaze, lo-fi, experimental electronica and punk rock".

==== Critical reception of Charm. Offensive. ====
In a four-star review for The New Zealand Herald, George Fenwick called Charm. Offensive. "a return to form" and "perhaps their most seamless and confident record to date." He noted that "there's a dynamic rhythm in the song structures and their order that gives the album an engaging depth."

=== O and This Is Not an Island Anymore (2018–2022) ===
2018 began with the return of Anderson (bass guitarist on Promises, Promises, Form and Harmony), initially for four January shows in New Zealand including Auckland's Laneways Festival, then five in Australia in early February. His return to the band became permanent.

In 2019, a 4-track EP, O, was released online and in a limited run of vinyl pressings. It was recorded in Melbourne and was the first Die! Die! Die! recording with Anderson since the Harmony sessions in 2011.

In 2020, another short release, "I Seek Misery" b/w "450", and in early 2022 This Is Not an Island Anymore, came out. It is the band's seventh album and debuted at number 32 on the New Zealand album charts.

== Live shows ==
Die! Die! Die! toured with Franz Ferdinand, Slint, The Brian Jonestown Massacre, The Pixies and The Blood Brothers, and played at several major festivals around the world including spots at SXSW, Incubate, China Hardcore Music Festival and Concrete and Grass.

== Members ==
Current members

- Andrew Wilson – lead vocals, guitar (2003–present)
- Michael Prain – drums (2003–present)
- Lachlan Anderson – bass guitar, backing vocals (2006–2012, 2018–present)

Former members

- Kane Goulter – bass guitar (2003)
- Henry Oliver – bass guitar, guitar (2003–2006)
- Michael Logie – bass guitar (2012–2016)
- Rory Attwell – bass guitar, backing vocals, production (2016–2018)

== Discography ==
Albums

- Die! Die! Die! (2006)
- Promises, Promises (2008)
- Form (2010)
- Harmony (2012)
- S W I M (2014)
- Charm. Offensive (2017)
- This Is Not an Island Anymore (2022)

EP's

- Die! Die! Die! (EP) (2005)
- Locust Weeks (2006)
- 7" split with High Dependency Unit (2007)
- Part Time Punks: At the Echo – April 8th, 2007 (2007)
- What Did You Expect (2015)
- O (2019)
- Smelter (2022)
