= The Promise: God's Purpose and Plan for When Life Hurts =

2008 book by Jonathan Morris

- Author: Morris, Father Jonathan
- Language: English
- Subject: Religion
- Publisher: HarperOne
- Publication date: 2008
- Publication place: US
- Media type: Hardcover, Paperback, Kindle Edition
- Pages: 230
- ISBN: 978-0-06-135341-3
- OCLC: 202537034
- Dewey Decimal: 248.8/6 22
- LC Class: BV4909 .M667 2008

The Promise: God's Purpose and Plan for When Life Hurts (2008) is a non-fiction self-help book written by Jonathan Morris, a Catholic priest, professor and news contributor and analyst for the Fox News Channel. The book is published by HarperOne.

== Background ==
In an interview, Morris said the idea behind his book came partly from a question posed to him by Neil Cavuto: "With all the suffering in the world, is God just really ticked off?" Morris said that he felt the widely asked question—why an all-loving, all powerful God would allow suffering—was the question to help address for readers, and that the topic of suffering was an issue that mattered the most for everyone.

== Content ==
In the introduction, Morris says that he has not written an answer to the philosophical question of suffering and evil, but a guidebook of spiritual principles and practical ideas.

The book is broken down into three areas:

- Part I: God on Trial
- Part II: Emotional and Spiritual Healing
- Part III: Principles for Freedom-Living

In Part I: God on Trial, Morris addresses the major questions, doubts and preconceived notions that many people have about the nature of God and faith. He also writes about the suffering of Jesus Christ as related in the Gospel accounts, as well as the challenge of reconciling the existence of suffering together with the existence of a merciful God. In Part II: Emotional and Spiritual Healing, the author highlights the complexity of suffering by examining the different kinds—physical, emotional, psychological, and spiritual—as well as some of the various sources of suffering. Part III: Principles for Freedom-Living is on living with a sense of holiness and awareness of one's particular calling in life.

== Critical reception ==
Charles J. Chaput, the Archbishop of Denver, wrote of the book and its author, "...Pope John Paul II spoke often and eloquently about the meaning of suffering. Father Morris has written a wonderful sequel to the Holy Father's thoughts, but from a very different perspective: that of a young priest; a man of energy, insight, world experience and engaging popular style." One critic (writing for catholic.net) wrote, "This is the first book of a young priest who is already fulfilling a big mission as an effective communicator of the Gospel to the American people."

== Sales history ==
In the first week of its release, The Promise was a #1 bestseller among the 'Christian Living' and 'Catholic-Inspirational' books on Amazon.com, and was a religion bestseller for HarperOne.
