= Opinions Won't Keep You Warm at Night =

Single by Kisschasy

from the album Hymns for the Nonbeliever
- B-side: "Berlin Chair"; "Blubber Boy"; "Under the Town"; "Less Than a Feeling"
- Released: 2 June 2007
- Recorded: 2006
- Studio: The Grove (Central Coast, Australia); Rockinghorse (Byron Bay, Australia)
- Length: 3:05
- Label: Below Par; Eleven; Virgin
- Composer: Kisschasy
- Lyricist: Darren Cordeux
- Producer: Chris Sheldon

Kisschasy singles chronology
"The Shake" (2006)	"Opinions Won't Keep You Warm at Night" (2007)	"Spray on Pants" (2007)

"Opinions Won't Keep You Warm at Night" is the first single from Kisschasy's second studio album Hymns for the Nonbeliever. The song was released via digital download and single CD in 2007. Kisschasy songwriter Darren Cordeux said in press release track notes, "It is a song about being happy with who you are and not letting other people's opinions of who you are or what you do affect you. At the end of the day what people think doesn't mean anything at all. People thought the world was flat once."

== Music video ==
The video portrays a date between fictionalized versions of United States President George W. Bush and former British Prime Minister Tony Blair, with former Australian Prime Minister John Howard tagging along. The three are played by actors with large cutout masks.

Bush, portrayed as a frat boy, picks up Blair (shown as a female in a pink dress) and her little brother Howard and takes them first to a diner (where Bush and Blair share a milkshake while Howard stuffs his face with ice cream), then to the Saint Kilda foreshore, a fairground, and finally a drive-in movie, drag racing North Korean Leader Kim Jong Il along the way.

After the movie (Gulf War II – This Time It's Pathetic), they proceed to queue outside a nightclub. Bush spots Dick Cheney at the head of the queue and abandons Blair and Howard to join him, leaving them to walk home alone. Inside, Kisschasy are playing. Bush disrupts their performance by jumping up on stage and dancing. He then attempts a stage dive, but no one catches him.

Members of the band appear in various roles throughout the video. Guitarist and creator of the video Sean Thomas said it has nothing to do with the actual song. "I just wanted to make my own South Park," he said in an interview. Commercial TV networks have largely played an alternative video clip for the song on their music television programmes, filmed at Western Sydney International Dragway, during a drag racing meeting.

== "Berlin Chair" cover ==
The cover of "Berlin Chair" was suggested by Sean as it is one of his favourite songs. You Am I drummer Rusty Hopkinson said in an interview on the You Am I forum: "I think that 'Berlin Chair' was the first emu song -- Australian emo. We should get Kisschasy to cover it."

== Track listings ==
iTunes single

1. "Opinions Won't Keep You Warm at Night" – 3:05

CD single and iTunes EP

1. "Opinions Won't Keep You Warm at Night" – 3:05
2. "Berlin Chair" – 2:36
3. "Blubber Boy" – 2:27

=== Limited-edition singles ===
CD A

1. "Opinions Won't Keep You Warm at Night" – 3:06
2. "Berlin Chair" – 2:37

CD B

1. "Opinions Won't Keep You Warm at Night" – 3:06
2. "Under the Town" – 1:18

CD D

1. "Opinions Won't Keep You Warm at Night" – 3:06
2. "Blubber Boy" – 2:28

CD E

1. "Opinions Won't Keep You Warm at Night" – 3:06
2. "Less Than a Feeling" – 3:45

== Charts ==
=== Weekly charts ===
Chart (2007)	Peak position
Australia (ARIA)	10

=== Year end charts ===
Chart (2007)	Position
Australian (ARIA)	67

== Certifications ==
Region	Certification	Certified units/sales
Australia (ARIA)	Gold	35,000^{^}
^{^} Shipments figures based on certification alone.
