= Spray on Pants =

Single by Kisschasy

from the album Hymns for the Nonbeliever
- Released: 10 November 2007
- Genre: Rock
- Length: 3:47
- Label: Below Par
- Songwriter(s): Karl Ammitzboll, Darren Cordeux, Sean Thomas, Joel Vanderuit

Kisschasy singles chronology
"Opinions Won't Keep You Warm at Night" (2007)	"Spray on Pants" (2007)	"Strings and Drums" (2008)

"Spray on Pants" is the second single from Kisschasy's second studio album Hymns for the Nonbeliever. It was released on 10 November 2007. The song is a take on the perceived emo subculture in Australia, alluding to the very tight black jeans often forming the basis of "emo" fashion. It peaked at #47 on the Australian ARIA Chart.

== Music video ==
The music video is constructed in a similar fashion to George A. Romero films, with two zombies dressed as stereotypical "emos" who initially bite a small child on his bike, making him a zombie as well. As they move closer and closer to the city (Melbourne), more and more zombies appear, and it appears on national television, on the evening news. The video is interspersed with footage of the band performing the song in a hallway, which ultimately is found by the zombies in the last verse. The band are attacked, but they manage to break free of the zombies' grasp- a visual metaphor for the band not succumbing to the fashion trends that surround both the music and the culture that has risen in recent years. The band devise a plan, by getting two bouncers to put velvet rope around a ship's storage compartment to make it look like a trendy club, to which the zombies pile in and dance. The zombies are then shipped off to England as the band watch on with satisfaction.

== Track listing ==
CD single

1. "Spray on Pants" – 3:49
2. "The Perfect Way to Meet" (live) – 2:53
3. "Ugly Birds in a Beautiful Cage" (live) – 3:55
4. "Opinions Won't Keep You Warm at Night" (live) – 3:43

iTunes EP

1. "Spray on Pants" – 3:50
2. "The Perfect Way to Meet" (live) – 2:53
3. "Ugly Birds in a Beautiful Cage" (live) – 3:55
4. "Opinions Won't Keep You Warm at Night" (live) – 3:43

== Charts ==
Chart (2007/08)	Peak position
Australia (ARIA)	47
