= Swearer =

Swearer may refer to:

- Benjamin Swearer (1825–1902), US Navy sailor and Medal of Honor recipient in the American Civil War
- Howard Swearer (1932–1991), American educator and president of Brown University
- USS Swearer (DE-186), a US Navy destroyer escort in World War II
