= Do-Do's & Whoa-Oh's =

2005 single by Kisschasy

Single by Kisschasy

from the album United Paper People
- B-side: "Resolution Wednesday"; "Doomsday"; "Hey Jealousy"
- Released: 4 July 2005
- Recorded: Megaphone (Sydney, Australia)
- Length: 3:32
- Label: Below Par; Eleven: A Music Company; Virgin
- Songwriters: Karl Ammitzboll; Darren Cordeux; Sean Thomas; Joel Vanderuit
- Producer: Phil McKellar

Kisschasy singles chronology
"Do-Do's & Whoa-Oh's" (2005)	"Face Without a Name" (2005)

"Do-Do's & Whoa-Oh's" is the first single taken from Australian rock band Kisschasy's debut album, United Paper People (2005). It was released on 4 July 2005 and peaked at number 25 on the Australian Singles Chart. The single was nominated for "Best Breakthrough Artist – Single" in the 2005 ARIA awards. The music video features the band on an ice skating rink, spontaneously appearing and moving around the rink.

== Track listing ==
All lyrics are written by Darren Cordeux; all music is composed by Kisschasy, except where noted. "Hey Jealousy" is a Gin Blossoms cover.

Australian CD single
No.	Title	Producer	Length
1.	"Do-Do's & Whoa-Oh's"	Phil McKellar	3:32
2.	"Resolution Wednesday"	Kisschasy	2:52
3.	"Doomsday"	Kisschasy	3:30
4.	"Hey Jealousy" (Doug Hopkins)	Kisschasy	3:44
Total length:			13:36

== Charts ==
Chart (2005)	Peak position
Australia (ARIA)	25

== Release history ==
Region	Date	Format(s)	Label(s)	Catalogue	Ref.
Australia	4 July 2005	CD	Below Par; Eleven: A Music Company; Virgin	PAR112	
