= Kisschasy =

Australian rock band

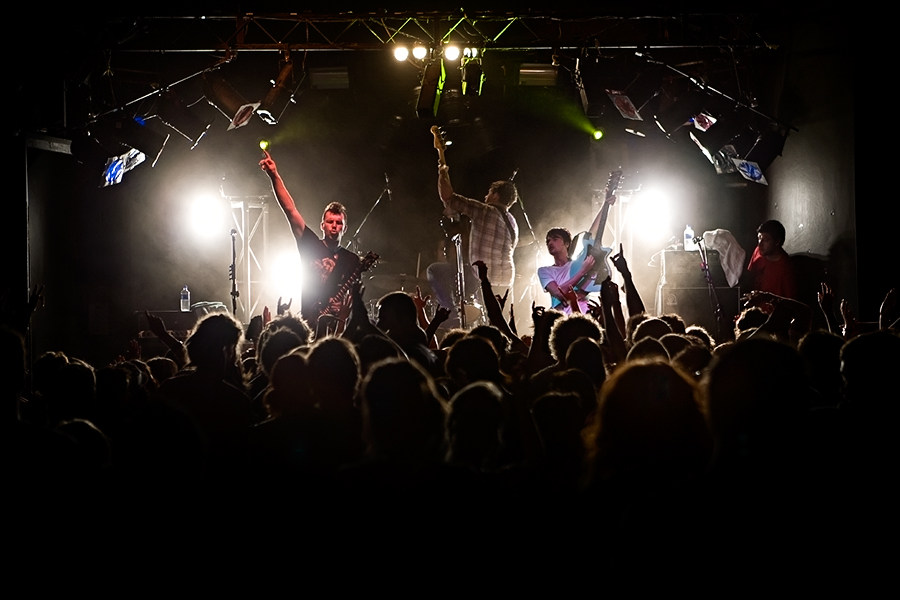
- Kisschasy performing at Great Northern Hotel in Byron Bay, New South Wales on 14 November 2007.

Background information
- Origin: Melbourne, Victoria, Australia
- Genres: Alternative rock, pop rock, emo, pop punk, emo pop
- Years active: 2002–2015, 2022–present
- Labels: Eleven: A Music Company (2005–2015); Below Par (2003–2008)
- Members: Darren Cordeux; Joel Vanderuit; Sean Thomas; Karl Ammitzboll
- Website: Kisschasy.com (Archive)

Kisschasy are an Australian rock band that formed in Melbourne, Victoria in 2002. Their line-up consists of lead vocalist Darren Cordeux, bassist Joel Vanderuit, guitarist Sean Thomas and drummer Karl Ammitzboll. The band released two gold certified studio albums, two extended plays, a documentary DVD and a compilation album in their initial 10-year career, selling in excess of 90,000 records.

== Band history ==
=== Formation and early releases ===
Kisschasy formed in 2002. Three of the four members of the band grew up near the small country town of Balnarring in the Mornington Peninsula of Victoria. Darren Cordeux, the lead singer and guitarist, grew up in Cranbourne, Victoria, a large town north of the Mornington Peninsula, Victoria. Joel Vanderuit, Sean Thomas and Karl Ammitzboll played in a local band called Tenpin, who achieved a little local success. The formation of Kisschasy happened when Tenpin met Cordeux's band at the Arthouse in Melbourne in early 2002. The band name ended up being a "toss-up between Kisschasy and "Other Stuff".

In 2004, Kisschasy released two EPs on indie label Below Par Records, the first titled Darkside / Stay Awake, the second Cara Sposa. The band toured in support of these EP's right up to the point of recording their first album United Paper People.

=== United Paper People (2005) ===
Kisschasy's debut album United Paper People was recorded and produced by Phillip McKellar (Silverchair, Grinspoon) in Sydney during February 2005. The band then flew to Seattle in March of the same year to mix United Paper People with Barrett Jones who had worked with the likes of Nirvana and the Foo Fighters.

The first single from the album was "Do-Do's & Whoa-Oh's", which gained heavy rotation on both commercial and alternative radio. The band received an ARIA Award for Breakthrough Artist - Single at the ARIA Music Awards of 2005 nomination for "Do-Do's & Whoa-Oh's", as well as a Channel V Oz Artist of the Year nomination in 2005. Kisschasy were also nominated for the "Spankin' New Aussie Artist" award at the MTV Australia Video Music Awards 2006.

=== Hymns for the Nonbeliever (2007–2008) ===
In late 2006, Kisschasy went into pre-production for their follow up to United Paper People, titled Hymns for the Nonbeliever. They recruited British producer Chris Sheldon, who had previously worked with acts such as Feeder, Pixies, Biffy Clyro, Therapy?, Anthrax and Foo Fighters, to produce, engineer, and mix. The album was recorded at The Grove Studios in the Central Coast of NSW and Rockinghorse Studios just outside Byron Bay throughout December 2006 and January 2007. The album's first two singles, "Opinions Won't Keep You Warm at Night" and "Spray on Pants", were mixed by Jerry Finn.

Hymns for the Nonbeliever was released on 21 July 2007. Hymns for the Nonbeliever was Kisschasy's second album to be certified gold in Australia. The third single off the album was "Strings and Drums".

In May 2008, EMI released a 16 track Kisschasy compilation album, titled Too B or Not Too B. The album includes acoustic tracks and b-sides, with a bonus DVD of all their music videos from United Paper People and Hymns for the Nonbeliever (excluding "Ugly Birds in a Beautiful Cage" as it was released just after the DVD).

=== Seizures and split (2009–2015) ===
Kisschasy's third studio album, Seizures, was released in August 2009 and recorded in Los Angeles with producer Rob Schnapf (Beck, Powderfinger, The Vines) In June 2009 they launched a new website in conjunction with the album's theme.

The album's first single, "Generation Why", was released to radio airplay and as a digital download on 7 July 2009. The song's music video was released onto YouTube prior to the single on 24 June 2009. It was released as a CD single on 24 July 2009. The song is about "armchair philosophers who love to complain," according to songwriter Darren Cordeux, who also said, "The title kind of came after the song was written so its not exactly specific to 'my generation' but I do spend the most time with people around my own age so I guess it could be taken that way". The album's second single, "Turnaround", was released in September 2009 and the video was shot at the Darlinghurst Community Centre, Sydney. In mid-January 2010 it was announced that the band's third single of the album would be 'Dinosaur'. The music video was created by a university student and featured two animated dinosaurs.

Kisschasy undertook the Seizures tour around Australia in late 2009, and in the same year the band was voted the Channel V Oz Artist of the Year. Kisschasy were part of the first announcement lineup for the 2010 Big Day Out. After their 2009 national tour, they also performed at Southbound, MS Fest, Pushover and Groovin' The Moo.

On 17 July 2015, the band announced on their Facebook page that they were disbanding, following the 10-year anniversary of their debut album. They simultaneously announced a farewell tour, which would see their debut album played in its entirety, alongside other crowd favourites. This tour ran throughout the month of October 2015.

=== Reunion (2022–present) ===
On 15 June 2022, Kisschasy were announced as one of the acts for Good Things Festival, with the band playing United Paper People in full on the tour. Following the completion of the run, the band announced a national Australian tour for May 2023.

In May 2025, they released "Lie to Me"; the first new music in 16 years followed by the release of "Parasite" in August.

== Personnel ==
- Darren Cordeux – lead vocals, rhythm guitar
- Joel Vanderuit – bass, backing vocals
- Sean Thomas – lead guitar, backing vocals
- Karl Ammitzboll – drums, backing vocals

== Discography ==
=== Studio albums ===
- United Paper People (2005)
- Hymns for the Nonbeliever (2007)
- Seizures (2009)
- The Terrors of Comfort (2026)

== Awards and nominations ==
=== ARIA Music Awards ===
The ARIA Music Awards is an annual awards ceremony that recognises excellence, innovation, and achievement across all genres of Australian music. They commenced in 1987. Kisschasy were named for three awards.

Year	Nominee / work	Award	Result	Ref.
2005	"Do-Do's & Whoa-Oh's"	Breakthrough Artist - Single	Nominated	
2005	David Homer & Aaron Hayward, Debaser for Kisschasy United Paper People	Best Cover Art	Nominated	
2007	Kisschasy: The Movie	Best Music DVD	Nominated	

=== Channel V Oz Artist of the Year ===
The Channel V Oz Artist of the Year was an annual award presented by Channel V Australia and is voted by the Australian public. It ran from 1997 to 2014. Kisschasy won one award from four nominations.

Year	Nominee / work	Award	Result
2005	Kisschasy	Channel V Oz Artist of the Year	Nominated
2007	Kisschasy	Channel V Oz Artist of the Year	Nominated
2008	Kisschasy	Channel V Oz Artist of the Year	Nominated
2009	Kisschasy	Channel V Oz Artist of the Year	Won
