= Whack Records discography =

This is the official catalog of Whack Records. The list is ordered by release number. Original release years are within the parentheses.

== Releases ==
Cat. #	Artist	Title	Format	Other information
518653536	Sneaky Sound System	Sneaky Sound System (2009)	CD	LP release.
SNEAK1CD	Sneaky Sound System	Pictures (2008)	CD	Single release.
SNEAK1V1	Sneaky Sound System	Pictures (2008)	7 inch Vinyl	Single release.
SNEAK1V2	Sneaky Sound System	Pictures (2008)	12 inch Vinyl	Single release.
SNEAK2CD1	Sneaky Sound System	UFO (2008)	CD	Single release.
SNEAK2CD2	Sneaky Sound System	UFO (2008)	CD	Single release.
SNEAK2V	Sneaky Sound System	UFO (2008)	12 inch Vinyl	Single release.
WHACK01	Sneaky Sound System	Hip Hip Hooray (2004)	CD	Single release.
WHACK02	Sneaky Sound System	Tease Me (2005)	CD	Single release.
WHACK03	Sneaky Sound System	I Love It (2006)	CD	Single release.
WHACK04	Sneaky Sound System	Sneaky Sound System (2006)	CD	LP release.
WHACK04CE	Sneaky Sound System	Sneaky Sound System (2006)	CD	LP Limited edition release.
WHACK04X	Sneaky Sound System	Sneaky Sound System (2006)	CD	LP Limited edition release.
WHACK05	Sneaky Sound System	Pictures (2006)	CD	Single release.
WHACK06	Sneaky Sound System	UFO (2007)	CD	Single release.
WHACK07	Sneaky Sound System	Goodbye (2007)	CD	Single release.
WHACK08	Sneaky Sound System	Kansas City (2008)	CD	Single release.
WHACK09	Sneaky Sound System	2 (2008)	CD	LP release.
WHACK09BONUS	Sneaky Sound System	Exclusive Limited Edition Bonus Disc (2008)	CD	EP release.
WHACK09USB	Sneaky Sound System	2 (2008)	USB	LP release.
WHACK10	Sneaky Sound System	When We Were Young (2008)	CD	Single release.
WHACK11	Sneaky Sound System	Kansas City (2008)	12 inch Vinyl	Single release.
WHACK12	Sneaky Sound System	When We Were Young (2008)	12 inch Vinyl	Single release.
WHACK13	Sneaky Sound System	16 (2009)	CD	Single release.
WHACK14	Sneaky Sound System	16 (2009)	12 inch Vinyl	Single release.
WHACK15	Sneaky Sound System	It's Not My Problem (2009)	Digital download	Single release.
WHACKV02	Sneaky Sound System	I Love It - Bag Raiders Remix (2006)	12 inch Vinyl	Single release.
WHACKV03	Sneaky Sound System	Pictures (2006)	12 inch Vinyl	Single release.
WHACKV04	Sneaky Sound System	UFO (2007)	12 inch Vinyl	Single release.
WHACKV05	Sneaky Sound System	Goodbye (2007)	12 inch Vinyl	Single release.

== See also ==
- Whack Records
- Sneaky Sound System
- Sneaky Sound System discography
