= Blue MC =

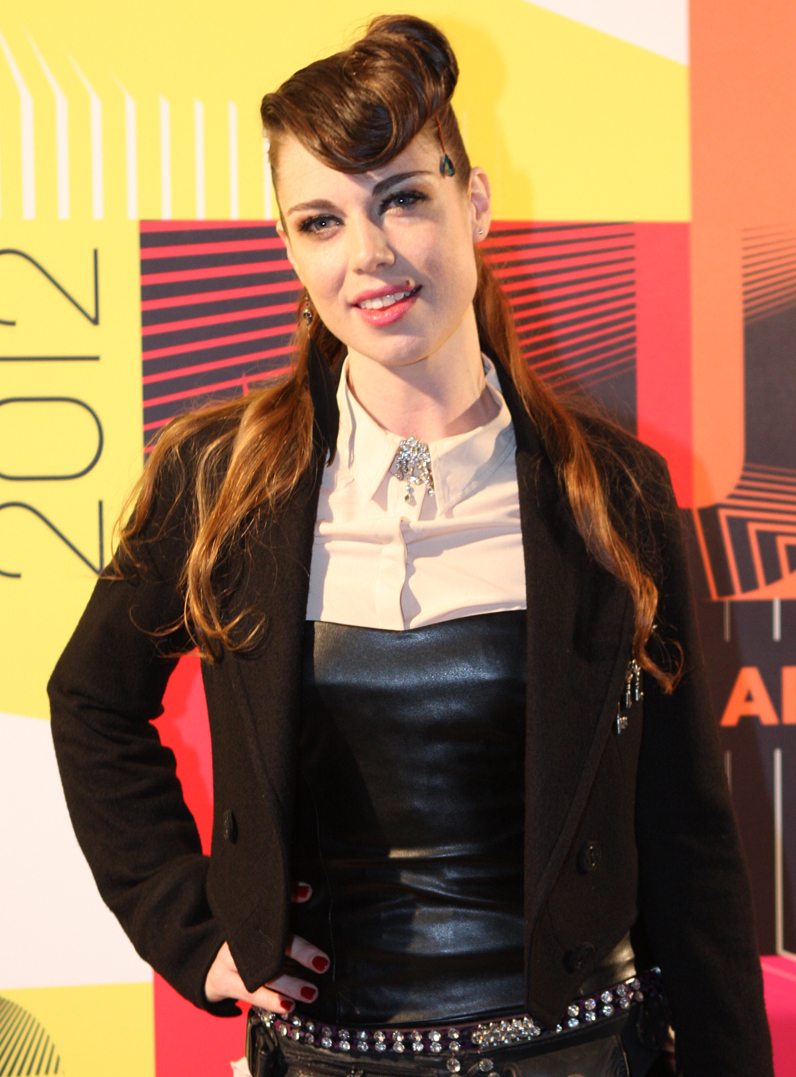
- Blue MC in 2012

Background information
- Born: 1977 or 1978 (age 47–48); Brisbane, Queensland, Australia
- Genres: electro; house; dance
- Occupation: Musician
- Instrument: Vocals
- Years active: 1995–present
- Member of: Kairos Kin
- Formerly of: The Potbelleez
- Website: bluemc.com

Marisa Catherine Lock (1977 or 1978), known professionally as Blue MC, is an Australian rapper and electronic music singer. She was vocalist for Australian electro-house and dance music group the Potbelleez from 2005 to 2012. At the APRA Music Awards of 2012 she won the Dance Work of the Year category for co-writing their song, "From the Music".

== Biography ==
Marisa Catherine Lock was born in 1977 or 1978 in Brisbane. She grew up in suburban Mansfield with her parents Colleen and Wayne and siblings. She attended St Catherine's Catholic Primary School, Wishart. From the mid-1990s she worked as a choreographer, dancer and model.

From 2000-2002 Blue MC was lead vocalist of hip-hop, funk band Chi-Qi with Travers Lee on bass guitar and saxophone, Lisa O'leary on bass guitar and guitar, Ommy on drums and Mr King on turntables. In 2003 she moved to Melbourne, performing her original repertoire alongside various local DJs over hip-hop, break-beat and house music where she began to focus on combining rap with electronic music. She wrote and recorded vocals for Australian producers, Bionik World, Superfluid and Hermitude. In 2004 Blue MC moved to London and worked with MC Xander as a beatbox duo called Streetbox. During time in London she wrote and featured vocals on two songs for United Kingdom electronic duo Hexstatic on their studio album, When Robots Go Bad (2007).

She returned to Sydney in late 2005 and joined the electro-house and dance music group the Potbelleez with Dave Goode on programming and DJing, Jonny Sonic on programming and DJing and iKid (Ilan Kidron) on vocals and guitar. She was recorded on both of their studio albums, The Potbelleez (2008) and Destination Now (2011); and the associated singles "Junkyard" (2007), "Trouble Trouble" (2008), "Hello" (2010), "From the Music" and "Midnight Midnight" (both 2011). At the APRA Music Awards of 2011 she was nominated for Dance Work of the Year for co-writing "Hello". In the following year she won Dance Work of the Year and was nominated for Most Played Australian Work for co-writing "From the Music". In 2012 she left the group to pursue solo projects.

She moved to Berlin in 2013 and competed in The Voice of Germany in 2014. During this time she worked closely with guitarist/composer/inventor Rainer Hirl aka Robin Sukroso. In late 2017 she met producer Marcus Maichel forming a new creative alliance. The duo are currently working on material for their up-coming project Cyborg Creature. Blue MC returned to Brisbane in 2019. As a member of electronic duo, Kairos Kin, alongside Terry Cassels (aka Kazm), she performed at Savannah on the Reef, Great Barrier Reef in May 2024.
