= Titanium (David Guetta song) =

2011 single by David Guetta featuring Sia

Single by David Guetta featuring Sia

from the album Nothing but the Beat
- Released: 9 December 2011
- Recorded: 2010
- Genre: House; dance; pop
- Length: 4:05 (album version); 5:12 (extended edit); 3:30 (radio edit)
- Label: Virgin; EMI
- Songwriters: David Guetta; Sia Furler; Giorgio Tuinfort; Nick van de Wall
- Producers: David Guetta; Giorgio Tuinfort; Afrojack

David Guetta singles chronology
| "Without You" (2011) | "Titanium" (2011) | "Turn Me On" (2011) |

Sia singles chronology
| "I Love It" (2011) | "Titanium" (2011) | "Wild Ones" (2011) |

Music video
- "Titanium" on YouTube

"Titanium" is a song by French DJ David Guetta featuring Australian singer-songwriter Sia from Guetta's fifth studio album, Nothing but the Beat. The song was written by Guetta, Sia, Giorgio Tuinfort, and Afrojack. Production was also handled by Guetta, Tuinfort, and Afrojack. "Titanium" was initially released for digital download on 25 August 2011, as the first of four promotional singles from the album. It was later released as the album's fourth single in 2011. The song originally featured vocals from American singer Mary J. Blige, whose version of the song leaked online in 2011.

"Titanium" is a pop song which draws from the genres of house and urban-dance. The song's lyrics are about inner strength. Critics were positive towards the song and noted it as one of the standout tracks from Nothing but the Beat. Sia's vocals received comparisons to those of Fergie, and the song was also musically compared to Coldplay's work. "Titanium" attained top 10 positions in several major music markets, including Australia, Austria, Canada, Denmark, Finland, France, Germany, Hungary, Ireland, Italy, the Netherlands, New Zealand, Norway, the Philippines, Thailand, Spain, Sweden, Switzerland, and the United States. In the United Kingdom, it peaked at number one, becoming Guetta's fifth number-one single on the chart and Sia's first.

The song's accompanying music video premiered on 20 December 2011 but does not feature appearances by Guetta or Sia, instead focusing on a young boy (played by actor Ryan Lee) with supernatural powers. On 12 August 2012, the music video was reused for a Spanish-language version of the song.

== Background ==
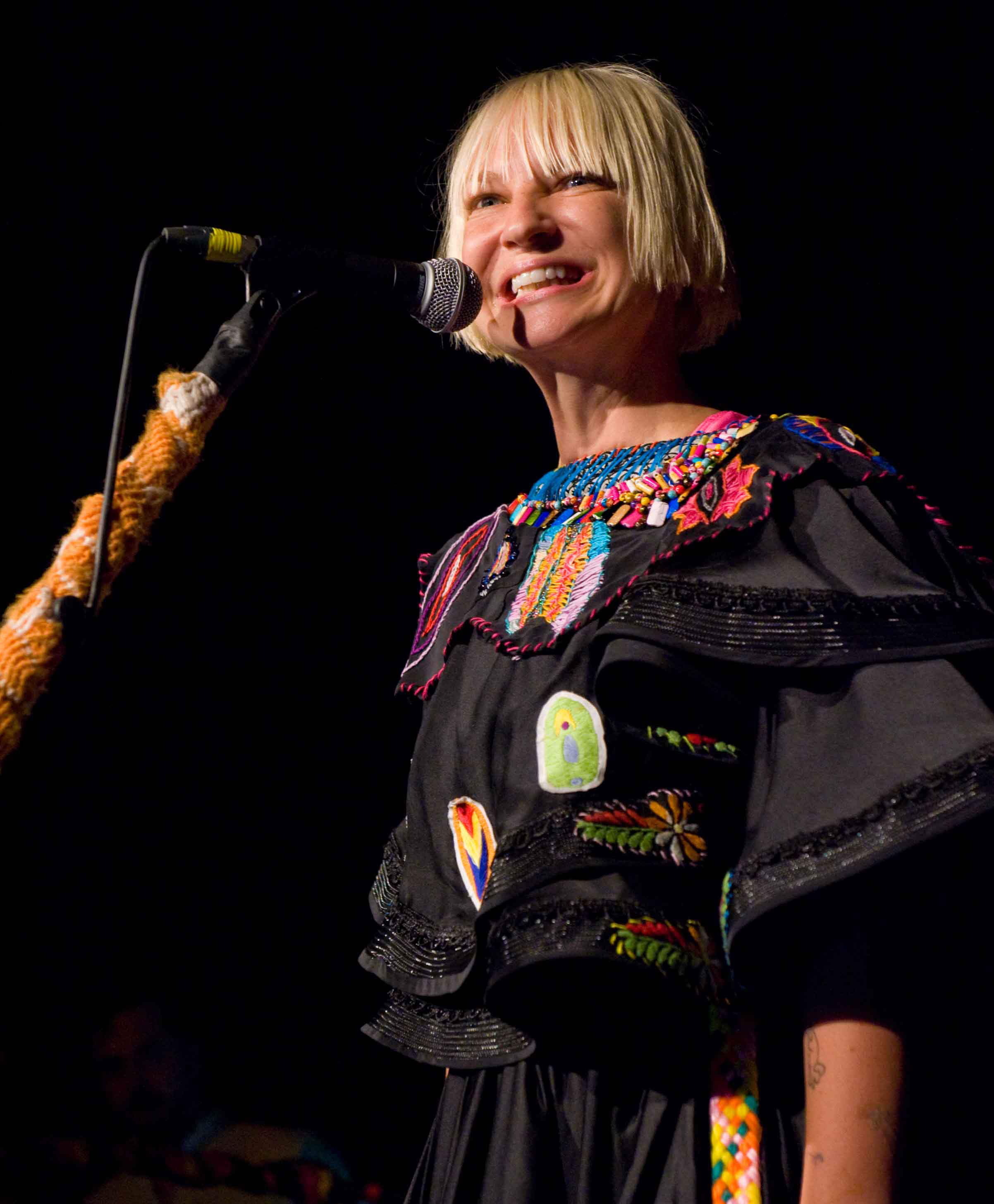
"Titanium" was co-written and performed by Sia (pictured in 2011).

"Titanium" was written by Guetta, Sia, Giorgio Tuinfort, and Afrojack. Production was also handled by Guetta, Tuinfort, and Afrojack. After discovering Sia's music online, Guetta picked her to appear on his fifth studio album, Nothing but the Beat. Guetta told an insider from Los Angeles, "I was totally amazed by Sia ... This has made me more curious to study her music more because I was really impressed. I have the biggest people on the album and she has a different profile, more like an indie kind of artist and it makes her song even more special, it makes it stand out I think."

The song originally featured vocals from American singer Mary J. Blige, whose version of the song leaked online in July 2011. In an interview with News.com.au, Guetta said of the leak, "You shouldn't even know about that ... I'd rather not speak about it." Sia recorded a demo of the song, which was then sent to Blige and other artists. American singer Katy Perry was the first person to be offered the track but turned it down because she felt its message was too similar to that of her song "Firework". An insider told Take 40 Australia, "So that 'Titanium' song, Sia wrote it for Katy, but [Katy] didn't want to do a song with Guetta ... " According to Sia's manager, Jonathan Daniel of Crush Management, Sia wrote the song for American singer-songwriter Alicia Keys. Guetta considered approaching other female singers to record on the song, however Perry advised him to keep Sia on the track. Eventually, Guetta decided to release Sia's version. He explained, "The first time I heard what Sia did ... I fell in love with it ... I didn't even want to give it to anyone else; it was perfect the way it was. It's not only about how big you are in America, it's about the song and the voice." Sia later revealed that Guetta did not tell her that her vocals would be released, saying, "And then he took [Blige's] vocal off it, and put my vocal back on, my demo vocal, without asking and released it. And I never even knew it was gonna happen, and I was really upset. Because I had just retired, I was trying to be a pop songwriter, not an artist."

"Titanium" was released for digital download on 8 August 2011, the first of four promotional singles from the album, as part of the iTunes Store's countdown to the album's release.

In 2021, David Guetta and Morten Breum debuted a future rave remix of "Titanium" to mark the 10th anniversary of the Nothing but the Beat album,

== Composition ==
"Titanium"
A 25-second sample of "Titanium".

"Titanium" is a house and urban-dance song, set in common time with a tempo of 126 beats per minute. It is written in the key of E♭ major, with a chord progression of E♭–B♭–Cm, however the chorus and breakdown are in C minor, with a chord progression of A♭–B♭–Gm–Cm. Sia's vocal range spans from G_{3} to E♭_{5}.

According to Andrew Gregory of The Daily Telegraph, the song's intro features "a hint of 80s flavour". Al Fox of BBC Music wrote that on the song, Sia has "ghostly mandolin-esque vocals". Cameron Adams of Herald Sun called them "square-peg", while Melinda Newman of HitFix compared her vocals to those by Fergie. Genevieve Koski of The A.V. Club wrote that on the song, Sia "manage[s] to keep [her] head above the waves of synths ... by amping up [her] vocals to match the outsized beats." David Jeffries of AllMusic compared the song to the music of Coldplay.

== Critical reception ==
Professional ratings
Review scores
| Source | Rating |
|---|---|
| Entertainment Weekly | B− |
| No Ripcord | 4/10 |

David Byrne and Tony Peregrin of Windy City Times described "Titanium" as "epic" and "energizing", writing, "it is Sia who steals the show" on Nothing but the Beat. Robert Copsey of Digital Spy agreed, calling the song one of "the record's standouts". Tom Ewing of The Guardian wrote, "Sia, on 'Titanium', handles the album's best hook well." Rich Lopez of Dallas Voice wrote that the "collaborative lyrics elevate this song to a higher level than any previous track" from the album, and called it "clever writing" from Sia. David Griffiths off 4Music called it "The most intriguing hook-up" on the album, writing that "'Titanium' sees Guetta giving the Australian songstress some long overdue commercial appeal, while Sia's vocals bring a quirky twist." Kerri Mason of Billboard described the song as "Guetta's quirkiest and most epic track to date (in itself an unusual combination)." Jamie Horne of The Border Mail called it a "strong" track. Joe Copplestone of PopMatters noted that songs on the album such as "Titanium" and "Night of Your Life", "recall the power" of Guetta's previous collaborations with Kelly Rowland on "When Love Takes Over" (2009) and "Commander" (2010). "Titanium" was nominated for Dance Work of the Year at the 2012 APRA Music Awards, but lost to "From the Music" by the Potbelleez.

After the Sandy Hook Elementary School shooting in December 2012, "Titanium" was pulled from radio stations in the United States due to the use of gun-related lyrics in the song. "Titanium" is part of a group of songs that were taken off the air, including Kesha's "Die Young", and "Pumped Up Kicks" by Foster the People.

== Chart performance ==
On the French Singles Chart, "Titanium" debuted at number nine on 13 August 2011. After weeks of ascending and descending the chart, the song peaked at number three on 7 January 2012, giving Guetta his thirteenth top 10 hit in France and Sia's first. In Australia, the song debuted at number 31 on the ARIA Singles Chart on 15 August 2011, and peaked at number five on 5 September 2011. It was certified five times platinum by the Australian Recording Industry Association (ARIA), denoting sales of 350,000 copies. "Titanium" became Sia's second highest-charting single as a solo artist in the country as well as Guetta's ninth top 10 hit there. On the New Zealand Singles Chart, it debuted at number 18 on 15 August 2011. The following week, the song fell to number 39 and eventually fell out of the top 40. Upon its release as a single in December 2011, "Titanium" re-entered the chart at number 12 on 5 December 2011, and peaked at number three on 30 January 2012. It was certified 7× platinum by Recorded Music NZ (RMNZ), denoting 210,000 equivalent units. In Austria, "Titanium" debuted and peaked at number three on 19 August 2011, and remained in the top 10 for ten consecutive weeks. The song was certified platinum by the International Federation of the Phonographic Industry (IFPI), denoting sales of 30,000 copies.

"Titanium" also reached the top 10 in the charts of Belgium, Canada, Denmark, Finland, Germany, Ireland, Italy, The Netherlands, Norway, Spain, Sweden and Switzerland. On the UK Singles Chart, "Titanium" debuted at number 16 on 20 August 2011, and fell to number 31 the following week. The song descended the UK Singles Chart for three consecutive weeks and eventually fell out of the top 100. Upon its release as a single in December 2011, "Titanium" re-entered the UK Singles Chart at number 61 on 14 January 2012, and climbed to number eight the following week. On 11 February 2012, it peaked at number one, and became Guetta's fifth number-one single on the chart and Sia's first. The song also reached number one on the UK Dance Chart. "Titanium" was certified six-times platinum by the British Phonographic Industry (BPI), denoting sales and streams of 3,600,000 units. "Titanium" was the fourth best-selling single of 2012 in the UK, and it has sold over one million copies there as of February 2013.

In the United States, the song debuted on the Billboard Hot 100 at number 66 on the issue dated 27 August 2011. After it was released to US radio in April 2012, "Titanium" reached a new peak of number seven on the issue dated 21 July 2012, and became Guetta's fourth top-ten single on the Hot 100. It also peaked at number three on the Hot Dance Club Songs chart, and number three on the Mainstream Top 40 chart. "Titanium" was certified double platinum by the Recording Industry Association of America (RIAA). As of March 2014, the song has sold 3,852,000 copies in the U.S.

== Music video ==
=== Background and reception ===
The music video for "Titanium" was directed by David Wilson. It was filmed in December 2011 in Sainte-Marthe-sur-le-Lac and at Dorval-Jean-XXIII High School, in the province of Quebec, Canada. A 14-second preview of the video was uploaded to Guetta's official YouTube account on 16 December 2011. The preview showed a young boy (played by actor Ryan Lee) in the smoky woods running away from a SWAT team of men. The video then closes with the caption, "The Music Video Coming Soon". The full video premiered online on 20 December 2011. Neither Guetta nor Sia appear in the video. Jason Lipshutz of Billboard noted that "the supernatural scene and suburban setting" in the video recall the science fiction film Super 8 (2011), in which Lee stars. Becky Bain of Idolator wrote that, "The video is beautifully shot, and is courageous enough not to answer all its mysteries." A writer for Capital FM called it a "very cinematic video".

=== Synopsis ===
In a deserted and destroyed school hallway, Lee's character is shown huddled on the ground. He slowly stands and walks down the hallway. He sees a female teacher in a classroom, who is horrified at the sight of him and closes the door. As the boy makes his way outside the school building, a police car arrives and the teacher rushes outside to tell the policeman about the boy, who rushes home on a bicycle to pack his things. At home, he sees a news report about the incident. Several policemen then appear outside the front door of the boy's house, while he tries to escape through the back door. The boy realizes that the door is locked, so he uses his telekinetic powers to grab the keys from the kitchen bench. The police breach the house to find two teddy bears floating in the air. The boy escapes into the woods, pursued by a SWAT team. An officer catches him and throws him to the ground. Surrounded and held at gunpoint, the boy gathers himself before using his supernatural powers once again to push the men away in a burst of power.

== Usage in media and live performances ==
"Titanium" was used in the Doctor Who episode "The Power of Three" and in the fifth season of the American television series Gossip Girl episode "I Am Number Nine", which aired on 7 November 2011. It also appears on the soundtrack of the 2014 film Wild Tales. Scottish recording artist Emeli Sandé performed "Titanium" with Guetta at the NRJ Music Awards, held in France on 29 January 2012.

On 21 April 2012, Sia made a surprise appearance during Guetta's set for the second weekend of Coachella in Indio, California, where they performed "Titanium". The song also appears in the 2016 dance video game Just Dance 2017. Sia performed the song throughout 2016 as a part of the setlist of her festival tour.

"Titanium" was performed by Anna Kendrick and Brittany Snow in the Pitch Perfect bathroom a cappella scene. It was also covered in 2019 by the cast of the American musical comedy television series Perfect Harmony. Dutch artist Glennis Grace performed the song with Afrojack at the Eurovision Song Contest 2021 in Rotterdam. In 2023, the horror film M3GAN had the titular robotic doll sing it as a lullaby.

Professional darts player Stephen Bunting also uses this song for his walk-on during televised PDC matches. In 2014 a television commercial for Close-Up toothpaste also featured the song.

The song was performed regularly at home games during the 2025 season of the Oklahoma City Thunder.

The MORTEN Future Rave Remix of "Titanium" was played before kickoffs at the 2026 FIFA World Cup, being the last song after "Dai Dai" and "DNA (More Than a Game)".

== Track listing ==
Digital download – EP
| No. | Title | Length |
|---|---|---|
| 1. | "Titanium (featuring Sia)" (Extended) | 5:12 |
| 2. | "Titanium (featuring Sia)" (Alesso Remix) | 6:43 |
| 3. | "Titanium (featuring Sia)" (Nicky Romero Remix) | 5:40 |
| 4. | "Titanium (featuring Sia)" (Arno Cost Remix) | 7:02 |
| 5. | "Titanium (featuring Sia)" (Gregori Klosman Remix) | 6:23 |
| 6. | "Titanium (featuring Sia)" (Cazzette's Ant Seeking Hamster Mix Remix) | 6:37 |

== Credits and personnel ==
Credits are adapted from the liner notes for Nothing but the Beat.

- Afrojack – songwriting, production, mixing
- Sia – songwriting, lead vocals
- David Guetta – songwriting, production, mixing
- Giorgio Tuinfort – songwriting, production

== Charts ==
=== Weekly charts ===
Weekly chart performance for "Titanium"
| Chart (2011–2026) | Peak position |
|---|---|
| Australia (ARIA) | 5 |
| Austria (Ö3 Austria Top 40) | 3 |
| Belgium (Ultratop 50 Flanders) | 10 |
| Belgium (Ultratop 50 Wallonia) | 4 |
| Brazil (Billboard Brasil Hot 100) | 18 |
| Brazil Hot Pop Songs | 4 |
| Canada Hot 100 (Billboard) | 7 |
| Canada AC (Billboard) | 34 |
| Canada CHR/Top 40 (Billboard) | 4 |
| Canada Hot AC (Billboard) | 17 |
| Colombia (National-Report) | 9 |
| Czech Republic Airplay (ČNS IFPI) | 5 |
| Denmark (Tracklisten) | 3 |
| Finland (Suomen virallinen lista) | 4 |
| France (SNEP) | 3 |
| Germany (GfK) | 5 |
| Global 200 (Billboard) | 176 |
| Honduras (Honduras Top 50) | 25 |
| Hungary (Dance Top 40) | 7 |
| Hungary (Rádiós Top 40) | 25 |
| Hungary (Single Top 40) | 40 |
| Ireland (IRMA) | 3 |
| Israel (Media Forest) | 1 |
| Italy (FIMI) | 3 |
| Mexico (Billboard Mexican Airplay) | 10 |
| Mexico Anglo (Monitor Latino) | 4 |
| Moldova Airplay (Media Forest) | 3 |
| Netherlands (Dutch Top 40) | 2 |
| Netherlands (Single Top 100) | 4 |
| New Zealand (Recorded Music NZ) | 3 |
| Norway (VG-lista) | 2 |
| Poland (Polish Airplay Top 100) | 50 |
| Poland (Polish Airplay TV) | 3 |
| Poland Dance (ZPAV) | 5 |
| Romania (Romanian Top 100) | 7 |
| Russia Airplay (TopHit) | 5 |
| Scottish Singles Sales (Official Charts) | 1 |
| Slovakia (Rádio Top 100 Oficiálna) | 13 |
| Slovakia Singles Digital (ČNS IFPI) | 94 |
| South Korea International Singles (Gaon) | 83 |
| Spain (Promusicae) | 5 |
| Sweden (Sverigetopplistan) | 3 |
| Switzerland (Schweizer Hitparade) | 9 |
| UK Singles (Official Charts) | 1 |
| UK Dance (Official Charts) | 1 |
| Ukraine Airplay (TopHit) | 38 |
| US Billboard Hot 100 | 7 |
| US Adult Pop Airplay (Billboard) | 24 |
| US Dance Club Songs (Billboard) | 3 |
| US Dance Airplay (Billboard) | 2 |
| US Pop Airplay (Billboard) | 3 |
| US Rhythmic Airplay (Billboard) | 13 |
| Venezuela Pop Rock General (Record Report) | 19 |

=== Year-end charts ===
Year-end chart performance for "Titanium"
| Chart (2011) | Position |
|---|---|
| Australia (ARIA) | 18 |
| Austria (Ö3 Austria Top 40) | 21 |
| Belgium (Ultratop 40 Wallonia) | 76 |
| Germany (Media Control AG) | 25 |
| Netherlands (Dutch Top 40) | 10 |
| Netherlands (Single Top 100) | 20 |
| Sweden (Sverigetopplistan) | 33 |
| Switzerland (Schweizer Hitparade) | 56 |

| Chart (2012) | Position |
|---|---|
| Belgium (Ultratop 50 Flanders) | 43 |
| Belgium (Ultratop 40 Wallonia) | 21 |
| Brazil (Crowley) | 9 |
| Canada (Canadian Hot 100) | 23 |
| France (SNEP) | 27 |
| Germany (Media Control AG) | 80 |
| Israel (ACUM) | 3 |
| Italy (FIMI) | 8 |
| Netherlands (Download Top 100) | 92 |
| New Zealand (RIANZ) | 11 |
| Russia Airplay (TopHit) | 20 |
| Spain (PROMUSICAE) | 18 |
| Sweden (Sverigetopplistan) | 20 |
| Switzerland (Schweizer Hitparade) | 25 |
| UK Singles (OCC) | 4 |
| US Billboard Hot 100 | 24 |
| US Dance Club Songs (Billboard) | 23 |
| US Dance/Mix Show Airplay (Billboard) | 3 |
| US Mainstream Top 40 (Billboard) | 23 |

| Chart (2013) | Position |
|---|---|
| Australia (ARIA) | 86 |
| Canada (Canadian Hot 100) | 76 |
| France (SNEP) | 140 |
| New Zealand (Recorded Music NZ) | 46 |
| Sweden (Sverigetopplistan) | 98 |
| UK Singles (OCC) | 122 |

| Chart (2015) | Position |
|---|---|
| France (SNEP) | 168 |

=== Decade-end charts ===
Decade-end chart performance for "Titanium"
| Chart (2010–2019) | Position |
|---|---|
| Australia (ARIA) | 18 |
| UK Singles (OCC) | 31 |

=== All-time charts ===
All-time chart performance for "Titanium"
| Chart | Position |
|---|---|
| UK Singles (OCC) | 67 |

== Certifications ==
Certifications and sales for "Titanium"
| Region | Certification | Certified units/sales |
|---|---|---|
| Australia (ARIA) | 5× Platinum | 350,000^{^} |
| Austria (IFPI Austria) | Platinum | 30,000^{*} |
| Belgium (BRMA) | 2× Platinum | 40,000^{‡} |
| Brazil (Pro-Música Brasil) | Platinum | 60,000^{‡} |
| Denmark (IFPI Danmark) | Platinum | 30,000^{^} |
| Finland (Musiikkituottajat) | Gold | 6,534 |
| France (SNEP) | Gold | 150,000^{*} |
| Germany (BVMI) | 2× Platinum | 1,200,000^{‡} |
| Italy (FIMI) | 4× Platinum | 120,000^{*} |
| Mexico (AMPROFON) | 2× Platinum | 120,000^{*} |
| New Zealand (RMNZ) | 8× Platinum | 240,000^{‡} |
| Portugal (AFP) | 3× Platinum | 75,000^{‡} |
| Spain (Promusicae) | 3× Platinum | 180,000^{‡} |
| Switzerland (IFPI Switzerland) | 2× Platinum | 60,000^{^} |
| United Kingdom (BPI) | 6× Platinum | 3,600,000^{‡} |
| United States (RIAA) | 5× Platinum | 5,000,000^{‡} |
Streaming
| Denmark (IFPI Danmark) | 3× Platinum | 2,700,000^{†} |
^{*} Sales figures based on certification alone.^{^} Shipments figures based on certification alone.^{‡} Sales+streaming figures based on certification alone.^{†} Streaming-only figures based on certification alone.

== Release history ==
Release dates and formats for "Titanium"
| Region | Date | Format |
|---|---|---|
| Austria | 9 December 2011 | Digital EP |
| Belgium | 9 December 2011 | Digital EP |
| Finland | 9 December 2011 | Digital EP |
| Germany | 9 December 2011 | Digital EP |
| Italy | 9 December 2011 | Digital EP |
| Netherlands | 9 December 2011 | Digital EP |
| Norway | 9 December 2011 | Digital EP |
| Switzerland | 9 December 2011 | Digital EP |
| France | 12 December 2011 | Digital EP |
| Luxembourg | 12 December 2011 | Digital EP |
| New Zealand | 12 December 2011 | Digital EP |
| Portugal | 12 December 2011 | Digital EP |
| Singapore | 12 December 2011 | Digital EP |
| Sweden | 12 December 2011 | Digital EP |
| Spain | 13 December 2011 | Digital EP |
| Ireland | 16 December 2011 | Digital Remix |
| United Kingdom | 16 December 2011 | Digital Remix |
| United States | 24 April 2012 | Contemporary hit radio |
| United States | 24 April 2012 | Rhythmic contemporary radio |

== Cover versions ==
Madilyn Bailey's version of "Titanium" reached number 13 on the French singles chart in 2015 and spent 34 weeks there. It also appeared on the Belgian French Wallonia Ultratop chart, peaking at number 23.

=== Jahméne Douglas version ===
British pop and soul singer Jahméne Douglas released a cover version of "Titanium" on 22 July 2013 as the lead single from his debut studio album, Love Never Fails (2013). Douglas' version peaked at number 94 on the UK Singles Chart. Talking to Digital Spy, Douglas said: "It's very hard to sing. I was scared to do it because it's a big chart song and I'm quite old school. For me, the song is about strength and the music video is based around domestic violence and how a woman gets out of it. The lyrics are so powerful for that interpretation. Hopefully if someone is in that situation and watches it, they'll think, I can get out." A music video to accompany the release of "Titanium" was first released onto YouTube on 12 June 2013 at a total length of three minutes and fifty-four seconds. The music video shows Douglas next to a piano, while a story of domestic abuse plays out.

== See also ==
- List of number-one hits of 2012 (Scotland)
- List of UK Singles Chart number ones of the 2010s
- List of UK Dance Chart number-one singles of 2012
- List of top 10 singles in 2011 (Australia)
- "Perfect Life" (Levina song), a song which allegedly plagiarizes Titanium.
- She Wolf (Falling to Pieces), another song from Nothing but the Beat featuring Sia
