= Rebillet =

Rebillet is a surname. Notable people with the surname include:

- Marc Rebillet (born 1988), French-American electronic musician and YouTuber
- Samantha Rebillet (1972–2017), Australian actress and screenwriter
