= Come with Me (Ricky Martin song) =

Single by Ricky Martin
- Released: June 14, 2013
- Recorded: 2013
- Studio: Sony Music Entertainment Studios (Sydney, New South Wales, Australia)
- Genre: EDM; dance-pop
- Length: 3:37
- Label: Sony Music Latin
- Songwriters: Anthony Egizii; Ilan Kidron; David Musumeci
- Producers: DNA Songs; IIan Kidron

Ricky Martin singles chronology
"Más y Más" (2013)	"Come with Me" (2013)	"Adrenalina" (2014)

Music video
- "Come with Me" "Come With Me" (Spanglish Version) on YouTube

"Come with Me" is a song recorded by Puerto Rican singer-songwriter Ricky Martin. It was produced by the Australian duo DNA Songs (Anthony Egizii and David Musumeci) and IIan Kidron from The Potbelleez. "Come with Me" premiered on June 13, 2013, during The Kyle and Jackie O Show in Australia and was digitally released worldwide on June 14, 2013. The Spanglish version of the song was released on July 18, 2013, and the 7th Heaven remixes were released on September 16, 2013.

== Release and cover ==
"Come with Me" premiered on Australian radio stations on June 13, 2013. It was digitally released the next day in most countries worldwide including Australia, Canada, France, Germany, Italy, Mexico, New Zealand, Spain, the United Kingdom and the United States. On July 15, a Spanglish version of the song was made available for digital download in the same territories. A four-track digital remix EP done by British remix and production team 7th Heaven was made available for download on September 16. The EP contains Radio and Extended version of both the English and Spanglish version of "Come with Me". The cover art for the single features Martin's half face and is in purple color. Mike Wass of Idolator criticized it, calling it less inspiring and further wrote, "This is one of the best-looking men in the world. Why would you distort his face and use that drab purple color?"

== Composition ==
"Come with Me" was written and produced by Anthony Egizii and David Musumeci better known under their production name DNA Songs in a collaboration with Ilan Kidron, a member of the three piece Irish-Australian electro house music group The Potbelleez. It was conceived during Martin's stay in Australia where was a coach on the second season of the talent show The Voice. The single is an uptempo club, dance-pop and EDM track with "scintillating Latino dance beats" and a length of three minutes and thirty-eight seconds (3:38). "Come with Me" features "a nice wobbly drum-and-bass effect on the chorus that leads into a big Ibiza rave-a-thon chorus." Idolator's Sam Lansky noted that the song has the same musical structure as Jennifer Lopez's 2013 single "Live It Up". Similarly, Brendon Veevers of Renowned for Sound compared the single to the collaboration releases by Lopez and rapper Pitbull and deemed it as an attempt to replicate the success of the works by other Latin artists.

== Reception ==
=== Critical ===
"Come with Me" received generally positive reviews from contemporary music critics. Carlos Quintana of About.com's Latina Sound wrote, "With its intoxicating beats, I am sure 'Come With Me' will be one of the most popular songs in the near future. If you are into mainstream music, you are going to love it." According to The Huffington Post, "Come with Me" is an upbeat club banger which sounds exactly like a fan would expect Martin's big return to sound, with Martin crooning about spending the night with someone over a danceable beat. American host and reviewer Ryan Seacrest wrote that it's a catchy hit which does not disappoint. Lansky wrote that with "Come with Me", Martin is going for the "mainstream radio jugular" describing it as a "big dancefloor banger that’s definitely, well, trend-riding". Despite that, according to him, "it feels like a pastiche of a million other better songs; the end result is just a little pedestrian." On the opposite side, Veevers was more critical towards the song giving it two out of five stars. He praised the decision for Martin to change his music style and go to different direction, however, according to him, the end result sounds foreign and uncomfortable for the singer, "Gone is the raw vocal emotion and instrumental passion – both of which have been replaced by an over the top production which appears to be aimed at a much younger fan-base with this comeback."

=== Commercial ===
In Australia, "Come with Me" debuted at number three. Martin appeared on the Australian Singles Chart for the first time since "I Don't Care" peaked at number twenty-five in 2005. "Come with Me" also became his fifth top ten single in Australia. In the first week of July 2013, the single was certified Gold by the ARIA. On July 1, 2012, Billboard reported that "Come with Me" debuted on the Latin Pop Songs at number thirty and Latin Airplay chart at number forty-nine. So far, the song has reached number five on Latin Pop Songs and number one on Latin Airplay. With 12 No. 1s, Martin passed Gloria Estefan (11) for the second-most toppers in the chart's 19-year history. Enrique Iglesias leads with 24 No. 1s. "Come with Me" also entered two other Billboard charts: Mexico Airplay and Mexico Espanol Airplay peaking at numbers nineteen and five respectively.

== Music videos ==
An official lyric video of the English version of the song was uploaded to Martin's official Vevo YouTube page on June 27, 2013. Martin also filmed two music videos for "Come with Me" on July 19, 2013, one for the English version of the song and one for the Spanglish version. The video for the Spanglish version premiered on August 14, 2013, on Univision. One week later, on August 21, 2013, both the English and Spanglish video were published on Vevo. The video was directed by Carlos Pérez.

== Live performances ==
Martin performed the song on the grand finale of The Voice in Australia on June 17, 2013, where he was one of the coaches. He also performed the Spanglish Version at the 2013 Premios Juventud on July 18, 2013, and on the finale of the La Voz Kids on July 28, 2013. Martin also performed "Come with Me" on The Ellen DeGeneres Show on September 26, 2013, and during the NRL Grand Final on October 6, 2013. He also performed it during his Ricky Martin Live: Australian Tour 2013 in October 2013. He also performed the song on March 30 during the finale of The Voice Arabia. He also performed the song on April 23, 2014, during the Chinese Music Awards. During the performance on The Ellen DeGeneres Show, one of the backing dancers suffered a wardrobe malfunction when the back of her top snapped, leaving her to improvise her way off the set. She eventually came back on to finish the performance.

== Awards ==
Year	Ceremony	Award	Result
2014	ASCAP Latin Awards	Pop Winning Song	Won
2014	International Dance Music Awards	Best Latin Dance Track	Nominated
2014	Premio Lo Nuestro	Video of the Year	Nominated
2014	World Music Awards	World's Best Songs	Nominated
2014	World Music Awards	World's Best Video	Nominated

== Formats and track listing ==
Digital download
No.	Title	Length
1.	"Come with Me"	3:37

Digital download
No.	Title	Length
1.	"Come with Me" (Spanglish version)	3:37

The Remixes
No.	Title	Length
1.	"Come with Me" (7th Heaven Remix) (radio version)	3:38
2.	"Come with Me" (7th Heaven Remix) (extended version)	5:45
3.	"Come with Me" (7th Heaven Spanglish Remix) (radio version)	3:39
4.	"Come with Me" (7th Heaven Spanglish Remix) (extended version)	5:46

== Charts ==
=== Weekly charts ===
Chart (2013)	Peak position
Australia (ARIA)	3
Dominican Republic Pop (Monitor Latino)	17
Italy (FIMI)	92
Mexico (Billboard Mexican Airplay)	19
Mexico Anglo (Monitor Latino)	9
New Zealand (Recorded Music NZ)	38
Russia Airplay (Tophit)	152
South Korea (Gaon Digital Chart)	88
Spain (Promusicae)	9
US Dance Club Songs (Billboard)	4
US Latin Airplay (Billboard)	1
US Latin Pop Airplay (Billboard)	5

=== Year-end charts ===
Chart (2013)	Position
US Latin Pop Songs (Billboard)	24

== Certifications ==
Region	Certification	Certified units/sales
Australia (ARIA)	Gold	35,000^{^}
Mexico (AMPROFON)	Gold	30,000^{*}
^{*} Sales figures based on certification alone.^{^} Shipments figures based on certification alone.

== Release history ==
=== Digital download ===
Country	Date	Format	Label
Australia	June 14, 2013	Digital download	Sony Music Latin
Canada	June 14, 2013	Digital download	Sony Music Latin
France	June 14, 2013	Digital download	Sony Music Latin
Germany	June 14, 2013	Digital download	Sony Music Latin
Italy	June 14, 2013	Digital download	Sony Music Latin
Mexico	June 14, 2013	Digital download	Sony Music Latin
New Zealand	June 14, 2013	Digital download	Sony Music Latin
Spain	June 14, 2013	Digital download	Sony Music Latin
United Kingdom	June 14, 2013	Digital download	Sony Music Latin
United States	June 14, 2013	Digital download	Sony Music Latin
Australia	July 15, 2013	Digital download (Spanglish version)	Sony Music Latin
Canada	July 15, 2013	Digital download (Spanglish version)	Sony Music Latin
France	July 15, 2013	Digital download (Spanglish version)	Sony Music Latin
Germany	July 15, 2013	Digital download (Spanglish version)	Sony Music Latin
Italy	July 15, 2013	Digital download (Spanglish version)	Sony Music Latin
Mexico	July 15, 2013	Digital download (Spanglish version)	Sony Music Latin
New Zealand	July 15, 2013	Digital download (Spanglish version)	Sony Music Latin
Spain	July 15, 2013	Digital download (Spanglish version)	Sony Music Latin
United Kingdom	July 15, 2013	Digital download (Spanglish version)	Sony Music Latin
United States	July 15, 2013	Digital download (Spanglish version)	Sony Music Latin

=== 7th Heaven Remixes ===
Country	Date	Format	Label
Australia	September 16, 2013	Digital remixes EP	Sony Music Latin
Canada	September 16, 2013	Digital remixes EP	Sony Music Latin
France	September 16, 2013	Digital remixes EP	Sony Music Latin
Germany	September 16, 2013	Digital remixes EP	Sony Music Latin
Italy	September 16, 2013	Digital remixes EP	Sony Music Latin
Mexico	September 16, 2013	Digital remixes EP	Sony Music Latin
New Zealand	September 16, 2013	Digital remixes EP	Sony Music Latin
Spain	September 16, 2013	Digital remixes EP	Sony Music Latin
United Kingdom	September 16, 2013	Digital remixes EP	Sony Music Latin
United States	September 16, 2013	Digital remixes EP	Sony Music Latin

== See also ==
- List of Billboard Hot Latin Songs and Latin Airplay number ones of 2013
