= Junkyard =

Junkyard may refer to:

- Wrecking yard, also known as a junkyard, salvage yard or scrap yard
- Junkyard (album), by Australian band The Birthday Party
- Junkyard (band), a hard rock band based in Los Angeles
- Junkyard, a dog from G.I. Joe who is owned by Joe member Mutt
- Junkyard, a Junkion from The Transformers
- "Junkyard", a song by Zac Brown Band
- "Junkyard", a song from In the Junkyard

== See also ==
- Junkyard Dog (disambiguation)
- Junkyard Wars, an engineering game show
