= Don't Hold Back (The Potbelleez song) =

Single by the Potbelleez

from the album The Potbelleez
- Released: 6 September 2007
- Recorded: 2007
- Genre: Dance; electro house
- Length: 3:27
- Label: Vicious
- Songwriters: David Greene; Ilan Kidron; Jonathan Murphy; Sam Littlemore

The Potbelleez singles chronology
"Duurty Dreemz" (2007)	"Don't Hold Back" (2007)	"Are You with Me" (2008)

"Don't Hold Back" is a song by the Irish-Australian band the Potbelleez, released on 6 September 2007 as the second single from their debut album The Potbelleez. The single is their most successful to date and received heavy airplay across Australia. It has gone on to sell over 210,000 copies in Australia alone and won Most Played Dance Work of year at 2009 APRA Awards. It has been featured as the key advertising song for "Jeep – Don't Hold Back" in Australia.

== Track listing ==
Australian CD single / iTunes EP

1. "Don't Hold Back" (Radio Edit) – (David Greene, Ilan Kidron, Jonathan Murphy, Sam Littlemore)
2. "Don't Hold Back" (12" Mix)
3. "Don't Hold Back" (Pot La More ClubDub)
4. "Don't Hold Back" (Drive Remix)
5. "Don't Hold Back" (Malente's Monster Dub)
6. "Don't Hold Back" (Totally Random Remix)

== Charts ==
Don't Hold Back peaked in the Australian ARIA singles chart at number 5. It spent a total of 36 weeks inside the Australian top 50 chart, and 19 in New Zealand

Year	Chart	Peak position	Certification
2007	Australian ARIA Charts	#5	3× Platinum
2008	New Zealand RIANZ Single Charts	#17	Gold

=== End-of-year charts ===
Country	Chart	Ranking
Australia	ARIA End of Year Singles	#15

== Release history ==
Country	Release	Format	Catalogue
Australia	6 October 2007	CD single	VG12063CD

== In popular media ==
- The song is featured in the PlayStation 2 game Singstar: Hottest Hits.
- "Don't Hold Back" featured as theme song for Jeep in Australia, Korea and New Zealand.
