= Trouble Trouble =

Single by the Potbelleez

from the album The Potbelleez
- Released: 2008
- Recorded: 2008
- Genre: Dance
- Length: 3:29 (radio edit); 5:54
- Label: Vicious Vinyl

The Potbelleez singles chronology
"Are You With Me" (2008)	"Trouble Trouble" (2008)	"Hello" (2010)

"Trouble Trouble" is a dance song by the Irish-Australian band the Potbelleez. The song was released as the third and final single from their debut album The Potbelleez.

== Music video ==
The music video starts off with Ilan Kidron waking up after a party. As he strolls through the house, flashbacks occur and the night retraces itself. As he walks into the cellar he finds a woman dressed in a police uniform. The night rewinds and it is revealed Ilan was a police officer checking on the party who was then seduced by the woman. The video closes with Ilan strolling over to his patrol car.

== Track listing ==
Digital download

1. "Trouble Trouble" (radio edit) - 3:29
2. "Trouble Trouble" - 5:54
3. "Trouble Trouble" (Carl Kennedy vocal mix) - 7:37
4. "Trouble Trouble" (Carl Kennedy club mix) - 8:11

== Charts ==
The single debuted on the ARIA Singles Chart at number 77 on 3 November 2008, and reached its peak of 54 on 1 December.

Chart performance for "Trouble Trouble"
Chart (2008)	Peak position
Australia (ARIA)	54
Australia Club (ARIA)	22
Australia Dance (ARIA)	11
Australian Independent Singles (AIR)	s4

The Goodwill remix charted on the ARIA Club Chart.

== Release history ==
Country	Release date	Format	Catalogue
Australia	18 October 2008	Digital EP	
Australia	25 October 2008	CD single	VG12096CD
