= Destination Now =

Studio album by the Potbelleez
- Released: 27 May 2011
- Genre: Pop, dance
- Label: Vicious Records

The Potbelleez chronology
The Potbelleez (2009)	Destination Now (2011)

Singles from Destination Now
- 1. "Hello" Released: 21 July 2010; 2. "Shake It" Released: 8 November 2010; 3. "From the Music" Released: 22 March 2011; 4. "Midnight Midnight" Released: 2 August 2011; 5. "Feed Off Me" Released: 5 December 2011

Destination Now is the 2nd studio album by Australian band the Potbelleez.

At the time of the album's release, the group was composed of DJs David Greene and Jonathon Murphy, rapper Marisa Lock and vocalist Ilan Kidron. (Lock subsequently left the group in 2012 to pursue solo projects.)

All tracks written by the Potbelleez with co-writers indicated below.

== Track listing ==
1. "Feed Off Me" – 3:28 (The Potbelleez / Paul Mac / Justin Shave)
2. "Shake It" – 3:18 (The Potbelleez / Paul Mac)
3. "Twitch" – 4:01 (The Potbelleez / Justin Shave)
4. "Midnight Midnight" – 2:41 (The Potbelleez / Paul Mac / Justin Shave)
5. "From the Music" – 3:12 (The Potbelleez / Justin Shave)
6. "Hello" – 3:28 (The Potbelleez / Justin Shave)
7. "Feels Real Good" – 4:39 (The Potbelleez / K. Hill / C. Luke)
8. "101 Reasons" – 5:34 (The Potbelleez / Paul Mac / G. Masters)
9. "Born Together" – 4:48 (The Potbelleez / Paul Mac / Justin Shave / J. Zwartz)
10. "I'll Show You" – 3:53 (The Potbelleez / Justin Shave)
11. "On My Own" – 4.48 (The Potbelleez)
12. "Standing Alone" – 4:16 (The Potbelleez / Justin Shave)
13. *"Hello (Let's Go)" (acoustic) – 3:24 (The Potbelleez / Justin Shave) *iTunes bonus track not on CD.

(n.b. Track six is titled "Hello" on the CD release, but is titled "Hello (Let's Go)" on iTunes.)

== Charts ==
The album debuted and peaked at No. 17 on the albums chart in Australia, matching the debut and peak of their previous album The Potbelleez. It spent three weeks inside the top 50.

Chart performance for Destination Now
Chart (2011)	Peak position
Australian Albums (ARIA)	17
Australian Dance Albums (ARIA)	4
