= The Voice of Germany season 4 =

The Voice of Germany
- Season 4
- Hosted by: Thore Schölermann; Doris Golpashin (V Reporter)
- Judges: Rea Garvey; Michi & Smudo; Stefanie Kloß; Samu Haber
- Winner: Charley Ann Schmutzler
- Winning coach: Michi & Smudo
- Runner-up: Lina Arndt

Release
- Original network: ProSieben and Sat.1
- Original release: October 9 – December 12, 2014

Season chronology
- ← Previous; Season 3 Next → Season 5

The Voice of Germany (season 4) is a German reality talent show that premiered on 9 October 2014 on ProSieben and Sat.1. Based on the reality singing competition The Voice of Holland, the series was created by Dutch television producer John de Mol. It is part of an international series. Only one judge from season 3, Samu Haber, singer of the Finnish pop-rock band Sunrise Avenue was retained for season 4. The other three judges of season 3, Nena, The BossHoss and Max Herre were replaced. Nena and The BossHoss had served for the program's all three previous seasons and Herre had been a new judge in season 3. They were replaced by the returning judge, the Irish singer-songwriter, guitarist Rea Garvey, a judge for seasons 1 and 2 coming back after a hiatus of a year. Stefanie Kloß lead singer of the band Silbermond resided for the first time in the series. So did the two collaborating judges sitting together, the German artists Michi Beck and Smudo both part of German hip hop group Die Fantastischen Vier. On 12 December 2014, Charley Ann Schmutzler was announced the winner of the season, marking Michi & Smudo's first win as a coach and the second duo coach to win in the show's history. Also, Schmutzler became the first winning artist to have only received one chair turn in the blind auditions.

== Teams ==
- Winner
- Runner-up
- Third place
- Fourth place
- Eliminated in the Semi-final
- Eliminated in the Quarterfinal
- Stolen in the Knockout rounds
- Eliminated in the Knockout rounds
- Stolen in the Battle rounds
- Eliminated in the Battle rounds

Coach	Top 64 Artists					
Stefanie Kloß						
Stefanie Kloß	Marion Campbell	Ben Dettinger	Anna Liza Risse	Bjorn Amadeus Kahl	~~Carlos Jerez~~	Elif Özcelik
Stefanie Kloß	Linda Antonia Heue	Sequola LaDeil	Nick Schäfer	Hafrún Kolbeinsdóttir	Laura Gerhäusser	Sabina Moser
Stefanie Kloß	Johanna & Jonathan Deis	Esther Jung	Jacko Zieverink	Andrea Stjernedal & Sebastian Schwarzbach	Roxanne Henghuber	Vlada Vesna
Samu Haber						
Samu Haber	Andrei Vesa	René Noçon	Katrin Ringling	Daniel Mehrsadeh	~~René Lugonic~~	Jamie Lee Fenner
Samu Haber	Maja Zaloznik	Shady Sheha	Philipp Rodrian	Johannes Holzinger	Michael Borman	Jackie Bredie
Samu Haber	Karoline Peter	Claudia Grabowski	Floriana Imeri	Kirk Smith	Arnold Meijer	Bec Lavelle
Rea Garvey						
Rea Garvey	Lina Arndt	Philipp Leon Altmeyer	Carlos Jerez	Alex Hartung	~~Andrei Vesa~~	Samantha McNair
Rea Garvey	Franziska Harmsen	Rita Movsesian	Camilla Daum	Koko Fitzgeraldo	~~Linda Antonia Heue~~	~~Dominik Oberwallner & Moritz Häußinger~~
Rea Garvey	Johanna Ewald	Jonny Akehurst	Rick Washington	Julia Zander	Lucia Aurich	Ingo Röll
Michi & Smudo						
Michi & Smudo	Charley Ann Schmutzler	Calvin Bynum	Stephanie Kurpisch	René Lugonic	~~Marion Campbell~~	Blue MC
Michi & Smudo	Ryan De Rama	Patrick Jakucs	Florian Boger	Dominik Oberwallner & Moritz Häußinger	~~René Lugonic~~	~~Alex Hartung~~
Michi & Smudo	Hanna Linnéa Mödder	Janina el Arguioui	Cris Rellah	Michael Antony Austin	Kris Madarasz	Erich Stoll
Note: Italicized names are stolen artists (names struck through within former teams).

== The first phase: The Blind Auditions ==
Key	Coach hit his or her "I WANT YOU" button	Contestant eliminated with no coach pressing his or her "I WANT YOU" button	Contestant defaulted to this coach's team	Contestant elected to join this coach's team

=== Episode 1: October 9, 2014 ===
Order	Contestant	Song	Coaches' and Contestants' Choices			
Order	Contestant	Song	Stefanie Kloß	Samu Haber	Rea Garvey	Michi & Smudo
1	Lina Arndt	"Big in Japan"				
2	Jen Dale	"Demons"	—	—	—	—
3	Stephanie Kuprisch	"Fallschirm"				
4	Michael Antony Austin	"I Wanna Dance With Somebody"	—		—	
5	Johanna & Jonathan Deis	"Unedlich"		—	—	—
6	Rick Washington	"Right Here Waiting"				
7	Dany Fernandez Peralta	"The Things We Lost In The Fire"	—	—	—	—
8	Steve vom Wege	"She Moves (Far Away)"	—	—	—	—
9	Sabrina Moser	"Holding on to heaven"			—	
10	Charley Ann Schmutzler	"Addicted to you"	—	—	—	
11	Philipp Rodrian	"Hey Laura"				—
12	Tuija Komi	"Close To You"	—	—	—	—
13	Alex Hartung	"Lose Yourself"				

=== Episode 2: October 10, 2014 ===
Order	Contestant	Song	Coaches' and Contestants' Choices			
Order	Contestant	Song	Stefanie Kloß	Samu Haber	Rea Garvey	Michi & Smudo
1	Flo Pfitzner	"Lifesaver"	—	—	—	—
2	Linda Antonia Heue	"What Is Love"				
3	Cris Rellah	"The Kill (Bury Me)"				
4	Stephanie Müller	"Samson"	—	—	—	—
5	Koko Fitzgeraldo	"Vodoo Woman"	—			
6	Hafrún Kolbeinsdóttir	"Crazy in Love"		—	—	—
7	Michael Bormann	"Warrior"	—		—	—
8	Jamie Lee Fenner	"I`m on fire"			—	—
9	Kokutekeleza Musebeni	"6 Billionen"	—	—	—	—
10	Johanna Ewald	"Halo"	—	—		—
11	Gregor Jonas	"Sing"	—	—	—	—
12	Vlada Vesna	"It`s oh so quiet"		—	—	—
13	Marion Campell	"Waves"	—		—	
14	Björn Amadeus Kahl	"Keine ist wie du"				

=== Episode 3: October 16, 2014 ===
Order	Contestant	Song	Coaches' and Contestants' Choices			
Order	Contestant	Song	Stefanie Kloß	Samu Haber	Rea Garvey	Michi & Smudo
1	Ben Dettinger	"Stay With Me"				
2	Marisa Lock ("Blue MC")	"Groove is in the heart"				
3	Luke Voigtmann	"You & I"	—	—	—	—
4	Dominik Oberwallner & Moritz Häußinger	"Hey there Delilah"	—	—		—
5	Janina el Arguioui	"Applaus, Applaus"	—	—		
6	Jackie Bredie	"Scream (Funk my life up)"				
7	Malte Feldmann	"Teenage Dream"	—	—	—	—
8	Roxanne Henghuber	"Hello, turn the radio on"			—	—
9	Shady Sheha	"Somebody like you"	—			—
10	Janina Vogt	"Afterlife"	—	—	—	—
11	Ryan de Rama	"Dark Horse"		—	—	
12	Oliver Blumentrath	"Watch over you"	—	—	—	—
13	Karoline Peter	"Almost is never enough"			—	

=== Episode 4: October 17, 2014 ===
Order	Contestant	Song	Coaches' and Contestants' Choices			
Order	Contestant	Song	Stefanie Kloß	Samu Haber	Rea Garvey	Michi & Smudo
1	Ingo Röll	"The man who can`t be moved"				
2	Christina Sommer	"Young and Beautiful"	—	—	—	—
3	Katrin Ringling	"That`s not my name"			—	
4	Calvin Bynum	"Lost"	—	—	—	
5	Nick Schäfer	"Und wenn ein Lied"		—	—	—
6	Sofia Andersson	"Rather Be"	—	—	—	—
7	Sequoia LaDeil	"She`s Always A Woman"			—	
8	Samantha McNair	"Team"	—	—		—
9	Dr. Martin Scheer	"Not Over You"	—	—	—	—
10	Hanna Linnéa Mödder	"My Funny Valentine"		—		
11	Serife Cigdem Güney	"River"	—	—	—	—
12	Jacko Zievernik	"Somebody To Love"		—	—	
13	Kirk Smith	"Like A Star"				

=== Episode 5: October 23, 2014 ===
Order	Contestant	Song	Coaches' and Contestants' Choices			
Order	Contestant	Song	Stefanie Kloß	Samu Haber	Rea Garvey	Michi & Smudo
1	Patrick Jakuces	"How He Loves"	—			
2	Sunshine Negyesi	"Happy"	—	—	—	—
3	Ester Jung	"Jolene"		—	—	—
4	Camilla Daum	"Habits (Stay High)"				
5	Randolph Rose	"Zieh die Schuhe aus"	—	—	—	—
6	Andrea Stjernedal & Sebastian Schwarzbach	"Lucky"		—	—	—
7	Floriana Imeri	"Tik Tok"			—	—
8	Carlos Jerez	"The Blowers Daughter"			—	—
9	Johannes Holzinger	"Der Weg"	—		—	
10	Lucia Aurich	"I Don`t Want To Wait"	—			—
11	Luisa Kummerfeld	"Gravity"	—	—	—	—
12	Benet Monteiro	"Am I Wrong"	—	—	—	—
13	Rene Nocon	"Schweigen ist Gold"				

=== Episode 6: October 24, 2014 ===
Order	Contestant	Song	Coaches' and Contestants' Choices			
Order	Contestant	Song	Stefanie Kloß	Samu Haber	Rea Garvey	Michi & Smudo
1	Anna Liza Risse	"The Only Exception"				
2	Bec Lavelle	"Stay (I Missed You)"	—		—	—
3	René Lugonic	"You`re Body Is A Wonderland"		—	—	
4	Sandra Scholler	"Love Runs Out"	—	—	—	—
5	Kris Madarasz	"Auf anderen Wegen"	—	—	—	
6	Maja Zaloznik	"You`re Nobody till somebody loves you"	—		—	—
7	Patrik Papke	"Say You Say Me"	—	—	—	—
8	Elif Özcelik	"Single Ladies (Put A Ring On It)"		—	—	—
9	Fabrice Kuhlmey	"Au Revoir"	—	—	—	—
10	Arnold Meijer	"Sunday Morning"			—	
11	Julia Zander	"Losing Sleep"	—	—		—
12	Matthias Bunk	"How Am I Supposed to Live Without You"	—	—	—	—
13	Jonny Akehurst	"November Rain"				

=== Episode 7: October 30, 2014 ===
Order	Contestant	Song	Coaches' and Contestants' Choices			
Order	Contestant	Song	Stefanie Kloß	Samu Haber	Rea Garvey	Michi & Smudo
1	Florian Boger	"A-N-N-A"		—		
2	Andrei Vesa	"When Doves Cry"		—		—
3	Franziska Harmsen	"Human"				—
4	Kevin Crenshaw	"XO"	—	—	—	—
5	Daniel Mehrsadeh	"Problem"	—		—	—
6	Rita Movsesian	"Galbi"	—	—		—
7	Laura Gerhäusser	"Somewhere Only We Know"		—		—
8	David Geister	"Auf Uns"	Team full	—	—	—
9	Philipp Leon Altmeyer	"Du bist das Licht"	Team full	—		—
10	Eleni Irakleous	"Baby I`m A Fool"	Team full	—	Team full	—
11	Claudia Grabowski	"You Found Me"	Team full		Team full	
12	Erich Stoll	"The Seed"	Team full	Team full	Team full	

== The second phase: The Battle Rounds ==
For this first time, this series will see the Steal Deal where eliminated contestants can be stolen by other coaches.

Key
– Coach hit his/her "I WANT YOU" button
– Artist defaulted to this coaches team
– Artist elected to join this coaches team
– Battle winner
– Battle loser
- Battle loser but was saved by another coach

=== Episode 8: October 31, 2014 ===
Order	Coach	Artist		Song	Coaches and artists choices			
Order	Coach	Artist		Song	Stefanie Kloß	Samu Haber	Rea Garvey	Michi & Smudo
1	Michi & Smudo	Ryan De Rama	Michael Antony Austin	"We Are the People"	—	—	—	—N/a
2	Samu Haber	Katrin Ringler	Jackie Bredie	"Bang Bang"	—	—N/a	—	—
3	Stefanie Kloß	Elif Özcelik	Jacko Zieverink	"Another Way to Die"	—N/a	—	—	—
4	Rea Garvey	Samantha McNair	Linda Antonia Heue	"Bang Bang (My Baby Shot Me Down)"		—	—N/a	
5	Stefanie Kloß	Nick Schäfer	Roxanne Henghuber	"Black Chandelier"	—N/a	—	—	—
6	Samu Haber	Shady Sheha	Kirk Smith	"Love Never Felt So Good"	—N/a	—N/a	—	—
7	Rea Garvey	Lina Arndt	Johanna Ewald	"I Can`t Make You Love Me"	—N/a	—	—N/a	—
8	Michi & Smudo	Blue MC	Alex Hartung	"Thrift Shop"	—N/a	—		—N/a

=== Episode 9: November 6, 2014 ===
Order	Coach	Artist		Song	Coaches and artists choices			
Order	Coach	Artist		Song	Stefanie Kloß	Samu Haber	Rea Garvey	Michi & Smudo
1	Michi & Smudo	Stephanie Kurpisch	Janina el Arguioui	"Irgendwie, Irgendwo, Irgendwann"	—N/a	—	—N/a	—N/a
2	Samu Haber	Johannes Holzinger	Bec Lavelle	"I See Fire"	—N/a	—N/a	—N/a	—
3	Stefanie Kloß	Anna Liza Risse	Sabina Moser	"Time Is Running Out"	—N/a	—	—N/a	—
4	Michi & Smudo	Florian Boger	Erich Stoll	"Traum"	—N/a	—	—N/a	—N/a
5	Samu Haber	Maja Zaloznik	Floriana Imeri	"Maps"	—N/a	—N/a	—N/a	—
6	Rea Garvey	Franziska Harmsen	Jonny Akehurst	"Calm After The Storm"	—N/a	—	—N/a	—
7	Stefanie Kloß	Ben Dettinger	Laura Gerhäusser	"Titanium"	—N/a	—	—N/a	—
8	Rea Garvey	Philipp Leon Altmeyer	Dominik Oberwallner & Moritz Häußinger	"Wolke 7"	—N/a	—	—N/a	

=== Episode 10: November 6, 2014 ===
Order	Coach	Artist		Song	Coaches and artists choices			
Order	Coach	Artist		Song	Stefanie Kloß	Samu Haber	Rea Garvey	Michi & Smudo
1	Rea Garvey	Andrei Vesa	Ingo Röll	"Pompeii"	—N/a	—	—N/a	—
2	Michi & Smudo	Charley Ann Schmutzler	Hanna Linnéa Mödder	"One"	—N/a	—	—N/a	—N/a
3	Samu Haber	Philipp Rodrian	Arnold Meijer	"Superheroes"	—N/a	—N/a	—N/a	—N/a
4	Stefanie Kloß	Sequoia LaDeil	Andrea Stjernedal & Sebastian Schwarzbach	"Drops of Jupiter"	—N/a	—	—N/a	—N/a
5	Michi & Smudo	Patrick Jakucs	Kris Madarasz	"I'm All Over It"	—N/a	—	—N/a	—N/a
6	Rea Garvey	Camilla Daum	Julia Zander	"Maneater"	—N/a	—	—N/a	—N/a
7	Samu Haber	René Noçon	Michael Borman	"Say Something"	—N/a	—N/a	—N/a	—N/a
8	Stefanie Kloß	Carlos Jerez	Esther Jung	"Radioactive"	—N/a	—	—N/a	—N/a

=== Episode 10: November 13, 2014 ===
Order	Coach	Artist		Song	Coaches and artists choices			
Order	Coach	Artist		Song	Stefanie Kloß	Samu Haber	Rea Garvey	Michi & Smudo
1	Michi & Smudo	Marion Campbell	Cris Rellah	"Burn It Down"	—N/a	—	—N/a	—N/a
2	Samu Haber	Daniel Mehrsadeh	Karoline Peter	"The One That Got Away"	—N/a	—N/a	—N/a	—N/a
3	Stefanie Kloß	Hafrún Kolbeinsdóttir	Vlada Vesna	"Blackbird"	—N/a	—	—N/a	—N/a
4	Rea Garvey	Koko Fitzgeraldo	Lucia Aurich	"All About That Bass"	—N/a	—	—N/a	—N/a
5	Samu Haber	Jamie Lee Fenner	Claudia Grabowski	"How Will I Know"	—N/a	—N/a	—N/a	—N/a
6	Stefanie Kloß	Björn Amadeus Kahl	Johanna & Jonathan Deis	"Geh` davon aus"	—N/a	—	—N/a	—N/a
7	Rea Garvey	Rita Movsesian	Rick Washington	"7 Seconds"	—N/a	—	—N/a	—N/a
8	Michi & Smudo	Calvin Bynum	René Lugonic	"Don`t"	—N/a		—N/a	—N/a

== The third phase: The Knockout Round ==
Three contestants sing an individual song and the coach decides which contestant will advance to the Live Shows.

Color key:

Artist won the knockout and advances to the Live shows
Artist lost the knockout and was eliminated
Artist lost the knockout but was stolen by another coach

=== Episode 11: November 13, 2014 ===
Coach	Order	Artist	Song	Artist	Song	Artist	Song	Coaches `Steal`
Stefanie	1	Sequoia LaDeil	"The Book Of Love"	Linda Antonia Heue	"Warwick Avenue"	Anna Liza Risse	"House Of Gold"	—
Samu	2	Maja Zaloznik	"I Just Want Make Love To You"	Shady Sheha	"Standing Outside The Fire"	Katrin Ringling	"Applause"	—
Michi & Smudo	3	Florian Boger	"Morgens immer müde"	Dominik Oberwallner & Moritz Häußinger	"Das kann uns keiner nehmen"	Stephanie Kurpisch	"Du hast den Farbfilm vergessen"	—
Rea	4	Camilla Daum	"Stay The Night"	Koko Fitzgeraldo	"I Can`t Stand The Rain"	Alex Hartung	"Can`t Hold Us"	—
Stefanie	5	Ben Dettinger	"Who You Are"	Elif Özcelik	"Unfaithful"	Carlos Jerez	"If I Ain`t Got You"	Rea Garvey

=== Episode 12: November 20, 2014 ===
Coach	Order	Artist	Song	Artist	Song	Artist	Song	Coaches `Steal`
Michi & Smudo	1	Marion Campbell	"Smells Like Teen Spirit"	Blue MC	"Doo Wop (That Thing) "	Charley Ann Schmutzler	"Reckoning Song"	Stefanie Kloß
Stefanie	2	Nick Schäfer	"Wonderwall"	Hafrún Kolbeinsdóttir	"The A Team"	Björn Amadeus Kahl	"Für immer ab jetzt"	—
Samu	3	Daniel Mehrsadeh	"Mirrors"	Philipp Rodrian	"Don`t Stop The Music"	Johannes Holzinger	"Videos Games"	—
Rea	4	Andrei Vesa	"Breakeven"	Philipp Leon Altmeyer	"Ich lass für dich das Licht an"	Rita Movsesian	"Desert Rose"	Samu
Michi & Smudo	5	Patrick Jakucs	"Ordinary People"	Calvin Bynum	"Brown Sugar"	Ryan De Rama	"All Of The Stars"	—
Rea	6	Samantha McNair	"Speechless"	Franziska Harmsen	"Towers"	Lina Arndt	"Sweater Weather"	—
Samu	7	Jamie Lee Fenner	"Words As Weapons"	René Lugonic	"Free Fallin`"	René Noçon	"Rennen + Stolpern"	Michi & Smudo

== The fourth phase: The Live shows ==
The live shows started on 21 November 2014. All Live shows were broadcast on Sat.1. In the first two live shows the four remaining contestants of every team were split in groups of two. After all the contestants in each group had sung their individual songs, the responsible coach had to award 20, 30 & 50 points to these contestants. After this a televoting had been held, which made up 50% of voting. The contestant with the most points advanced to final.

In the Semifinal and Final the coach didn't vote and only the public decided who will advance and win The Voice of Germany 2014.

=== Episode 14: November 21, 2014 ===
Voting	Coach	Candidat	Song	Songs in the "Clash"	Points		
Voting	Coach	Candidat	Song	Songs in the "Clash"	Coach	Puplic	Total
1	Michi & Smudo	Stephanie Kurpisch	Lass die Musik an	Keine Rosen	50	18,3	68,3
1	Michi & Smudo	Stephanie Kurpisch	Lass die Musik an	Schrei nach Liebe	50	18,3	68,3
1	Michi & Smudo	Charley Ann Schmutzler	Yellow	I Couldn’t Care Less	50	81,7	131,7
1	Michi & Smudo	Charley Ann Schmutzler	Yellow	Only Love Can Hurt Like This	50	81,7	131,7
2	Stefanie; Kloß	Ben Dettinger	Fix You	Feeling Good	58	48,0	106,0
2	Stefanie; Kloß	Ben Dettinger	Fix You	Use Somebody	58	48,0	106,0
2	Stefanie; Kloß	Björn Amadeus Kahl	Amoi seg’ ma uns wieder	Human	42	52,0	94,0
2	Stefanie; Kloß	Björn Amadeus Kahl	Amoi seg’ ma uns wieder	Wie soll ein Mensch das ertragen	42	52,0	94,0
3	Samu; Haber	Katrin Ringling	Running Up That Hill	Boom Clap	50	37,7	87,7
3	Samu; Haber	Katrin Ringling	Running Up That Hill	The Days	50	37,7	87,7
3	Samu; Haber	Andrei Vesa	Secrets	Geronimo	50	62,3	112,3
3	Samu; Haber	Andrei Vesa	Secrets	High Hopes	50	62,3	112,3
4	Rea; Garvey	Alex Hartung	Stronger	Empire State of Mind	50	49,6	99,6
4	Rea; Garvey	Alex Hartung	Stronger	Not Afraid	50	49,6	99,6
4	Rea; Garvey	Philipp Leon Altmeyer	Engel	Wie ich	50	50,4	100,4
4	Rea; Garvey	Philipp Leon Altmeyer	Engel	So Perfekt	50	50,4	100,4

Non-competition performances
Order	Performers	Song
14.1	Rea Garvey	"Oh My Love"
14.2	Kiesza ft. Top 8 Liveshow #1	"Hideaway"
14.3	Sunrise Avenue	"Nothing Is Over"

=== Episode 15: November 28, 2014 ===
Voting	Coach	Candidat	Song	Songs in the "Clash"	Points		
Voting	Coach	Candidat	Song	Songs in the "Clash"	Coach	Puplic	Total
1	Michi & Smudo	Calvin Bynum	Magic	The Man	65	43,0	108,0
1	Michi & Smudo	Calvin Bynum	Magic	Marilyn Monroe	65	43,0	108,0
1	Michi & Smudo	René Lugonic	Rude	I’m Yours	35	57,0	92,0
1	Michi & Smudo	René Lugonic	Rude	Shake It Off	35	57,0	92,0
2	Samu; Haber	Daniel Mehrsadeh	Chandelier	This Love	45	38,2	83,2
2	Samu; Haber	Daniel Mehrsadeh	Chandelier	All of Me	45	38,2	83,2
2	Samu; Haber	René Noçon	Das Gold von morgen	Lass uns gehen	55	61,8	116,8
2	Samu; Haber	René Noçon	Das Gold von morgen	Still	55	61,8	116,8
3	Stefanie; Kloß	Marion Campbell	They Don’t Care About Us	Heroes (We Could Be)	51	53,6	104,6
3	Stefanie; Kloß	Marion Campbell	They Don’t Care About Us	Whole Lotta Love	51	53,6	104,6
3	Stefanie; Kloß	Anna Liza Risse	Survivor	Best of You	49	46,4	95,4
3	Stefanie; Kloß	Anna Liza Risse	Survivor	I Write Sins Not Tragedies	49	46,4	95,4
4	Rea; Garvey	Carlos Jerez	Don’t You Worry Child	Drive By	40	17,9	57,9
4	Rea; Garvey	Carlos Jerez	Don’t You Worry Child	Little Lion Man	40	17,9	57,9
4	Rea; Garvey	Lina Arndt	Take Me to Church	Riptide	60	82,1	142,1
4	Rea; Garvey	Lina Arndt	Take Me to Church	Summertime Sadness	60	82,1	142,1

Non-competition performances
Order	Performers	Song
14.1	Christina Perri	"Human"
14.2	Jessie J ft. Top 4 Liveshow #1	"Masterpiece"
14.3	Silbermond	"Symphonie"
14.4	Christina Perri	"Jar Of Hearts"

=== Episode 16 (Semifinal): December 5, 2014 ===
The semifinal saw the introduction of "The Cross-Battles". Two contestant of different teams sing an individual song. The contestant with the most public votes advances to the final. After the announcement of the finalist, the winning contestant sang his winning song. All songs, also the ones which were not presented live, were released on iTunes. Every download counted as two phone calls from the public in the final voting. With the advancements of Campbell and Vesa to the finale, this is the first instance where a finalist represents a coach that did not originally turn for them in the blind auditions.

Sing- duell	Coach	Candidate	Song	Televote (in %)	Winning Single of Finalist
1.	Rea Garvey	Lina Arndt	"Mad World"	59	"Love in a Cold Room"
1.	Samu Haber	René Noçon	"Kartenhaus"	41	—
2.	Samu Haber	Andrei Vesa	"Hometown Glory"	81,4	"Moving On"
2.	Stefanie Kloß	Ben Dettinger	"Locked Out Of Heaven"	18,6	—
3.	Stefanie Kloß	Marion Campell	"No More I Love You`s"	79,2	"Lifetime"
3.	Michi & Smudo	Calvin Bynum	"Under The Bridge"	20,8	—
4.	Michi & Smudo	Charley Ann Scmutzler	"Cry Me a River"	65,7	"Blue Heart"
4.	Rea Garvey	Philipp Leon Altmeyer	"Meine Soldaten"	34,3	—

Non-competition performances
Order	Performers	Song
15.1	Coldplay	"A Sky Full Of Stars"
15.2	Die Fantastischen 4	"Single"
15.3	Gregory Porter	"Hey Laura"

=== Episode 17 (Final): December 12, 2014 ===
Rang #	Coach	Contestant	Songs		Televoting and Downloads in %
1.	Michi & Smudo	Charley Ann Schmutzler	Winner Single	"Blue Heart"	41,75
1.	Michi & Smudo	Charley Ann Schmutzler	Duet with Coach	"25"	41,75
1.	Michi & Smudo	Charley Ann Schmutzler	Duet with Guest Artist	"Take Me to Church" with Hozier	41,75
2.	Rea Garvey	Lina Arndt	Winner Single	"Love in a Cold Room"	21,92
2.	Rea Garvey	Lina Arndt	Duet with Coach	"Hurt"	21,92
2.	Rea Garvey	Lina Arndt	Duet with Guest Artist	"Thinking Out Loud" with Ed Sheeran	21,92
3.	Samu Haber	Andrei Vesa	Winner Single	"Moving On"	19,28
3.	Samu Haber	Andrei Vesa	Duet with Coach	"More Than Words"	19,28
3.	Samu Haber	Andrei Vesa	Duet with Guest Artist	"Ghost" with Ella Henderson	19,28
4	Stefanie Kloß	Marion Campbell	Winner Single	"Lifetime"	17,05
4	Stefanie Kloß	Marion Campbell	Duet with Coach	"Roxanne"	17,05
4	Stefanie Kloß	Marion Campbell	Duet with Guest Artist	"Wrapped Up" with Olly Murs	17,05
