= Samantha Rebillet =

Australian actress, and screenwriter

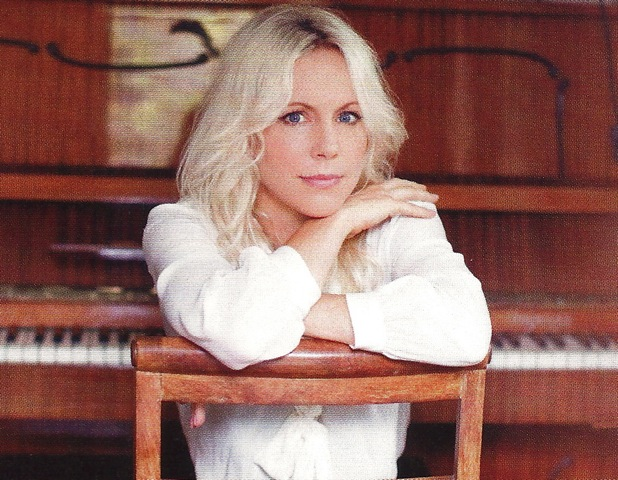
- Samantha Rebillet
- Born: Samantha Rebillet; 8 January 1972; Paris, France
- Died: 27 November 2017 (aged 45); Sydney, New South Wales, Australia
- Education: University of Technology Sydney, Australian Film, Television and Radio School
- Occupations: Film director, actress, screenwriter, producer, singer, songwriter
- Years active: 1982–2017
- Spouse: Ilan Kidron
- Children: 2

Samantha Rebillet (8 January 1972 – 27 November 2017) was a French-born Australian film director, actress, screenwriter, producer, singer and songwriter. She had guest roles in various Australian television series and roles in several films. Rebillet wrote, directed and produced several films and documentaries including the 2004 documentary Butterfly Man which won a Silver Cub Award at the International Documentary Film Festival in Amsterdam.

== Early life and education ==
Rebillet was born in Paris, France, but moved to Australia with her family at an early age. She was fluent in French, Spanish and English.

Rebillet attended SCEGGS Darlinghurst, an independent high school in Sydney. She grew up in the movie making world, accompanying her father, Chris Maudson and adopted father Richard Brennan around film sets. She completed a Bachelor of Drama at the University of New South Wales in 1998 and did further studies, obtaining two master's degrees - a masters in Media Arts and Production at the University of Technology, Sydney (UTS) in 2002, and a masters in Directing Drama at the Australian Film Television and Radio School in 2006. She was on her way to obtaining a Doctorate of Creative Arts at the UTS

== Career ==
Rebillet first appeared on screen in the seminal Australian film Newsfront, and in Going Down in 1983.

Rebillet went on to gain credits in several other features including Heatwave, Così and I Can't Get Started, and was cast in international commercials with Sega, AT&T and Kraft. Other early guest roles included appearances in several Australian television series Water Rats, Murder Call and All Saints.

Despite years as an actor, Rebillet always wanted to be a director and eventually, in her twenties, got behind the camera by working as a director's assistant to Mark Joffe (The Man Who Sued God) and Alex Proyas (Garage Days and iRobot). Since graduating from the Australian Film Television and Radio School in 2006, Rebillet has written and directed prize winning short films and documentaries, alongside TV commercials, corporate videos and music clips. Her documentary 'Butterfly Man' (2004) has picked up major awards both in Australia and abroad, including the Silver Cub Award at the International Documentary Film Festival Amsterdam(IDFA), while her short 'All Shook Up' was a finalist in the 2003 Tropfest Short Film Festival. Her drama films have featured some Australian actors such as Mia Wasikowska and Maeve Dermody. Rebillet was chosen as the Australian representative at the Artist Residency 5Sur5 in Belgium, and her work has screened regularly on television in Australia, International Broadcast and Qantas Inflight.

Rebillet has taught film studies at Macquarie University, COFA/UNSW, Metro Screen and NIDA and is currently a part-time lecturer and Doctorate candidate at the University of Technology, Sydney. Rebillet is currently developing the Kickstarter-funded feature-length film, The Last Goodbye as a part of her study.

She also formed part of the electronic jazz pop outfit The Freaks in Love with her husband Ilan Kidron of the Potbelleez.

== Style and process ==
Rebillets's approach to filmmaking is influenced by the handheld and improvisational approach preferred by filmmakers such as Darren Aronofsky, Alejandro González Iñárritu and Gus Van Sant. According to an interview with Filmink in February 2014, this is still a 'developing style'. Using this improvisational approach for her film The Last Goodbye, Rebillet wrote the script in 'broad brushstrokes', allowing for the finer details to be further developed during filming itself.

== Personal life ==
Rebillet was married to Ilan Kidron from the Australian electro-house and dance music group, Potbelleez. She has two children, Remi (born 1993) and Gabe (born 2002). In 2010 she suffered from a life-threatening brain tumor, but recovered. Rebillet was an active supporter for the Cure Brain Cancer Foundation in Australia and helped to organize the Wayside Chapel's Art To Heart charity fundraiser.

== Death ==
Rebillet took her own life on 27 November 2017 aged 45.

== Filmography ==
=== Actress ===
Year	Production	Role
1982	Heatwave	Younger Houseman Child
1983	Going Down	Disgruntled Blonde Child
1983	Molly	Contemptuous Student
1985	I Can't Get Started (TV series)	Albert's Child
1996	Così	Student Actor
1997	Water Rats (TV series)	Young Woman
1997	Murder Call (TV series)	Claire Halligan
1998	All Saints (TV series)	Cathy Bell
2010	Miscast	TVC Mum
2012	The Last Goodbye	Bianca

=== Director ===
Date	Production	Type	Notes
2002	The Birthday	Short Film	
2003	All Shook Up	Short Film	Also credited as writer
2003	I Can't Wait	Music Video	Artist: Brooke
2004	Butterfly Man	Short Documentary	Also credited as writer. Won Silver Cub award at IDFA
2004	The Suitor	Short Film	
2005	The Round Ball	SBS Interstitual	Also credited as writer
2005	Damage	TV series	One hour pilot
2006	Kiss Kiss	Short Documentary	Also credited as writer
2006	Cosette	Short Film	Also credited as writer
2007	Outside In	Short Film	Also credited as writer
2008	Flickerfest 2009 Trailer	Trailer	
2008	Outside Over There	Documentary	Documentary funded for development (Screen Australia)
2009	Love Bites	Short Film	Educational film for screening in high schools in Australia
2011	Geography of the Hapless Heart (Sydney Segment)	Short Film	International feature consisting of five short films
2012	The Last Goodbye	Feature Film	Franco-Australian feature film currently in post production
