= Junkyard Dog (disambiguation) =

Junkyard Dog (born Sylvester Ritter, 1953–1998) was an American professional wrestler.

Junkyard Dog, or its initials JYD may refer to:

== People ==
- Norvell Austin, American professional wrestler, who was using the name years before Ritter.
- Jerome Williams (basketball) (born 1973), former professional basketball player in the NBA
- Dean Laidley (born 1967), Australian rules football player and coach
- Jared Dudley (born 1985), former college basketball player for Boston College where he was originally recognized by that nickname
- DeMarre Carroll (born 1986), American professional basketball player in the NBA
- Stewart Mills III, wealthy businessman and politician, Republican candidate for Minnesota's 8th Congressional district

== Other ==
- Junkyard Dog, a 2010 American film
- Junkyard Dog (film), a 2023 French film
- The Junkyard Dog, a novel by Robert Wright Campbell

== See also ==
- "Bad, Bad Leroy Brown", which prominently mentions the phrase "junkyard dog" in its chorus
- Junkyard (disambiguation)
- Scrapheap Challenge or Junkyard Wars
