= Are You with Me (The Potbelleez song) =

Single by the Potbelleez

from the album The Potbelleez
- Released: 2008
- Recorded: 2008
- Genre: House
- Length: 3:42 (radio edit)
- Label: Vicious Vinyl
- Songwriters: J. Sonic; D. Goode; I. Kidron; S. Littlemore

The Potbelleez singles chronology
"Don't Hold Back" (2007)	"Are You with Me" (2008)	"Trouble Trouble" (2008)

"Are You with Me" is a song by the Irish-Australian band the Potbelleez, released in 2008 as the second single from their debut album The Potbelleez.

The band's vocalist Ilan Kidron was asked about the piano melody's similarity to that of "Clocks" by Coldplay, and said: "We didn't do it consciously at all. We went into a studio and were stuck. We came across that melody and decided to go with it. But having something to do with Coldplay isn't so bad at all."

== Track listing ==
Australian CD single

1. Are You with Me (Radio Mix)
2. Are You with Me (Original Mix)
3. Are You with Me (Hook N Sling Mix)
4. Are You with Me (Original Acid Mix)
5. Are You with Me (Mind Electric Mix)

== Chart performance ==
"Are You with Me" was a Gold-selling single in Australia and has yet to be released outside of Australia and New Zealand.

== Charts ==
=== Weekly charts ===
Chart (2008)	Peak position
Australia (ARIA)	15
Australian ARIA Physical Singles Chart	#14
Australian ARIA Australian Singles	#3
Australian ARIA Digital Chart	#17
Australian ARIA Dance Chart	#2
Australian ARIA Club Chart (A)	#2
Australian Airplay Chart	#17
Australian Independent Records Singles Chart	#1

(A) means that the Original Mix/Hook N Sling Mix/Original Acid Mix/Mind Electric Mix/mrTimothy Mix charted.

=== Year-end charts ===
Country	Chart	Ranking
Australia	ARIA End of Year Singles	77

== Release history ==
Country	Release date	Format	Catalogue
Australia	7 June 2008	CD single	VG12088CD
