= Jahméne =

British singer, songwriter, activist, and poet

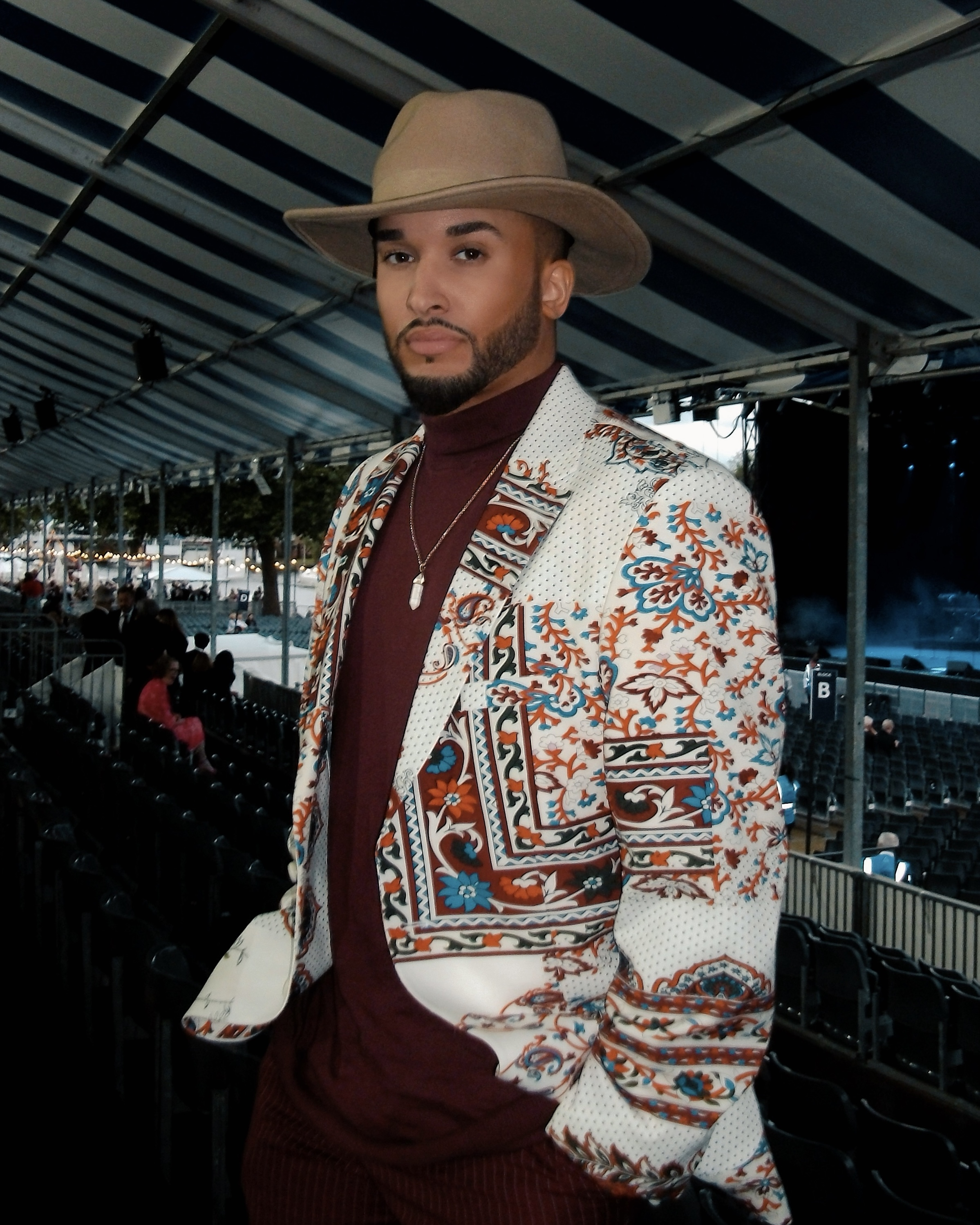
- Jahméne Douglas at Henley Festival, 10th July 2024.

Background information
- Born: Jahméne Douglas; 26 February 1991 (age 35); Birmingham, England
- Genres: R&B, soul, gospel
- Occupations: Singer, Songwriter, Poet, Activist, Graphic Designer & Photographer
- Instrument: Vocals
- Years active: 2012–present
- Labels: RCA (2012–2014); Moonshot Music (2014–2017); Independent Artist (2018-Present)
- Website: https://www.instagram.com/jahmeneofficial/

Jahméne Douglas (born 26 February 1991) is a British soul/gospel singer who records under the mononym Jahméne. (Pronounced: Jah-main.) He finished in second place on the ninth series of The X Factor in 2012.

In December 2012, he signed a record deal with Sony Music. In July 2013, he released his debut studio album, Love Never Fails, which peaked at number one on the UK Albums Chart and included appearances from Nicole Scherzinger, in a duet of "The Greatest Love of All", and Stevie Wonder, who lent his harmonica skills on "Give Us This Day".

In September 2014, Jahméne signed his second deal with Independent Label Moonshot Music and released his second album, Unfathomable Phantasmagoria, in September 2016.

== Personal life ==
Jahméne Douglas was born in Birmingham to Mandy Thomas and Eustace Douglas. He is of mixed heritage which includes St. Kitts (Caribbean), Welsh and English. He was the first youth ambassador of the UK charity Women's Aid, for children and young people.

Jahméne, along with his mother Mandy Thomas, were subjected to prolonged and severe physical, emotional, and psychological abuse by his father. In 2008, Jahméne’s eldest brother, Daniel, tragically died by suicide following the early release of their father from prison.

In 2012, Jahméne Douglas emerged as a voice in the fight against domestic violence, using his public platform to advocate for survivors and challenge the stigma surrounding abuse. Alongside his mother, Mandy Thomas, he has worked to bring the often-silenced issue into mainstream conversation, helping to shift public attitudes through television appearances, interviews, and campaigns. Jahméne has been the Ambassador and advocate for important causes such as: Women’s Aid, Childline, Peace One Day and NSPCC.

Jahméne is a Christian and speaks openly about how his faith has pulled him through many dark places. His debut album's title, Love Never Fails, is taken from the scripture 1 Corinthians 13, one of his favourite passages in the Bible. The idea of the album was to have spiritual twists on the chosen covers. Jahméne has been seen exercising his faith in public. He refused to sing "Last Friday Night (T.G.I.F.)" by Katy Perry, for an X Factor group ensemble performance, because of its graphic/unsuitable lyrical content. He opined that Ella Henderson, 16 at the time, should not be made to sing the song and that lyrically it was not suitable for the family show.

=== Mandy Thomas B.E.M. ===
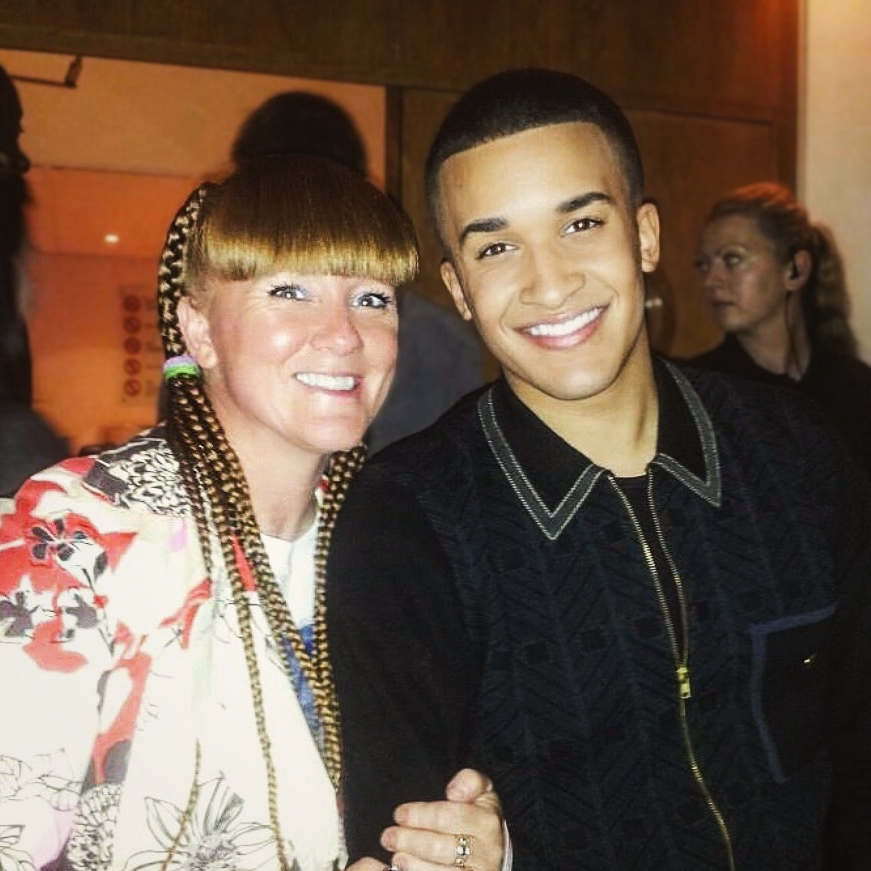
Jahméne Douglas with his mother, Mandy, in 2012.

On 8 October 2015, Mandy published her first book, You Can’t Run, through Ebury, an imprint of Penguin Random House. The publication offers a detailed and deeply personal account of her relationship with Jahméne’s father. The foreword was contributed by esteemed author and campaigner Katie Piper.

Mandy is an author, poet, and artist, as well as a photographer. In addition to her creative work, she is a dedicated justice advocate and a recognised media commentator on issues relating to domestic abuse. Her efforts are focused on raising public awareness, influencing policy, and securing support for victims of domestic violence.

In October 2020, Mandy was awarded the British Empire Medal (B.E.M.) in recognition of her outstanding contribution to campaigning against domestic abuse.

== Television ==
=== 2012: The X Factor ===
On 30 May 2012, Douglas auditioned in London for the ninth series of The X Factor. He sang Etta James' "At Last" with a powerful voice in what Louis had stated as a "revelation" and received a yes from each of the judges Louis Walsh, Tulisa, Gary Barlow and Nicole Scherzinger. Douglas managed to advance to judges' houses, where he impressed mentor Nicole Scherzinger with his rendition of David Guetta's "Titanium", thereby making it to the live shows.

On 8 December, he was the first act to make it safely through to the second night of the live finals, along with Arthur.

He finished the competition in second place.

In August 2013, Douglas performed in Indonesia for RCTI's 24th anniversary television special, X Factor Around the World.

== Debut Album Love Never Fails ==
On 19 December 2012, it was announced that Douglas had signed a record deal with Sony Music. On 25 January 2013, it was confirmed that he had signed with RCA Records and would be releasing his debut album in May.

It was announced by RCA Records that Douglas' first album would be called Love Never Fails and would be released on 22 July. It debuted at number one in the UK. Douglas also donated all of his profits from the single "Titanium" to the domestic abuse campaigns of the charity Women's Aid. The album features appearances from his X Factor mentor Scherzinger and Stevie Wonder. He released a single from the album, a cover of David Guetta's "Titanium", onto his Vevo account on 12 June 2013.

When it became clear that a cover album was being strongly encouraged by the label, Jahméne proposed a concept that aligned with his artistic vision and spiritual values. His intention was to reinterpret classic songs through a spiritual lens, collaborating with renowned Gospel artists he deeply admired. The goal was to help bridge the gap between the UK and US Gospel scenes, and to further elevate the profile of Christian music within the UK. The label initially agreed to this creative direction, and Jahméne proceeded to sign the deal.

At the time, Jahméne had already secured high-profile collaborations with Stevie Wonder and Nicole Scherzinger, reinforcing the strength and reach of his concept.

Jahméne had also received positive responses from Gospel icon Kim Burrell and Missy Elliott, and had planned to approach other influential artists including Kirk Franklin, Yolanda Adams, CeCe Winans, LaShun Pace, and The Clark Sisters.

However, nearing the end of Jahméne completing recording his contributions to the album, the label abandoned the original concept—likely to expedite the album’s release. This shift was a significant disappointment. In subsequent interviews, Jahméne has expressed that it became increasingly evident the label lacked belief in his artistry from the outset. Despite backing from the legendary Stevie Wonder and him waiving his fee in support of the project — the focus appeared to be more on commercial return than on artistic integrity.

In August 2013, Douglas performed in Indonesia for RCTI's 24th anniversary television special, X Factor Around the World, along with Samantha Jade, The Collective, Melanie Amaro, Novita Dewi and Fatin Shidqia. "Titanium" subsequently hit number 1 the following day in Indonesia.

== Sophomore Album Unfathomable Phantasmagoria ==
The album, Unfathomable Phantasmagoria, was released on 23 September 2016. This album features 16 tracks with Jahméne also writing several tracks. Samuel L. Jackson lent his voice to the project. Jahméne met Jackson in 2012 when he invited Jahméne to sing at a charity ball he was hosting. He lends his voice to the intro of the album opening the record with the Bible verse 1 Corinthians 13:4–8. Jackson then goes on to read from, Galatians 5:22–23 as an interlude on the album, which also features in the lead single's video, "Is This the Time?" Jahméne then went on to release "I Wish" from the album as the anthem for the charity Peace One Day. The song was written by Diane Warren.

The album consists of his signature sound, including soul, R&B and gospel. Notable writers other than Diane Warren include Andrea Martin, Stanley Brown (Shirley Caesar, Hezekiah Walker, Karen Clark Sheard), Sacha Skarbek, Electric (Little Mix, Rihanna, The Wanted) and Jim Beanz (Timbaland, Chris Brown, Dru Hill).

Jahméne stated that he had more control over the process of making the album in comparison to his first, from the sound, to his songwriting, down to the artwork and title. The sleeve inside the physical copy even includes one of Jahméne's poems entitled "Shadow Serpent".

=== Artwork ===
The album cover design, conceptualised by Jahméne, features a backdrop of an arrangement of peacock feathers symbolising a Seraph / Seraphim, encompassing Jahméne within a triangle, the strongest geometric shape, representing the powerful combination of the Father God, the Son Jesus, and the Holy Spirit.

“And their whole body, with their back, their hands, their wings, and the wheels that the four had, were full of eyes all around.” - Ezekiel 10:12 (NKJV)

The photo was taken by Edward Cooke.

=== Poetry ===
On the 6th July in 2017, Jahméne released a book containing a collection of 75 poems entitled, Unfathomable Phantasmagoria.

=== Track listing: Unfathomable Phantasmagoria ===
| No. | Track title | Writer(s) | Producer(s) | Length |
|---|---|---|---|---|
| 1 | "1 Corinthians 13:4–8" (featuring Samuel L. Jackson) | Bible verse; Andrea Martin | Damian Montagu | 1:00 |
| 2 | "Never Too Far Away" | Andrea Martin, Jenay Daniels | Stanley Brown | 3:33 |
| 3 | "Love" | Jim Beanz, Raghav Mathur, Donnell Shawn Butler | Charlie J Perry, SOS, Harmony Samuels | 3:18 |
| 4 | "Catch the Rhythm" | Jahméne, Sacha Skarbek | Damian Montagu, Charlie J Perry | 3:48 |
| 5 | "Tornado" | Jahméne, Tim Kellett, Christian 'Crada' Kalla | Crada | 3:11 |
| 6 | "Down for Love" | Jahméne, Davinché, Tim Kellett | Davinché | 3:50 |
| 7 | "Get It Right" | Jahméne, Mo Brandis, Tim Kellett | Charlie J Perry, Damian Montagu | 3:00 |
| 8 | "Galatians 5:22–23" (featuring Samuel L. Jackson) | Bible verse; Jahméne, Max Marshall, Electric | Charlie J Perry, Damian Montagu | 0:59 |
| 9 | "Is This the Time?" | Jahméne, Max Marshall, Electric | Charlie J Perry | 3:27 |
| 10 | "Look Up" | Jahméne, Stanley Brown, Courtney Rumble | Stanley Brown | 4:23 |
| 11 | "When I See Ya" | Andrea Martin, Bruce Robinson | Stanley Brown, Charlie J Perry | 4:08 |
| 12 | "My Faith" | Phil Taylor, Said Hussain | Phil Taylor | 3:44 |
| 13 | "I Wish" | Diane Warren | Damian Montagu | 4:08 |
| 14 | "Forever & Eternity" | Jahméne, Charlie J Perry | Charlie J Perry, Damian Montagu | 3:43 |
| 15 | "Reach You" | Laura Leanne Critchley, Joseph Spenser Mott | Damian Montagu | 4:36 |
| 16 | "If You Just" | Jahméne, Arden Hart | Damian Montagu | 4:04 |
| 17 | "Right Away" (hidden track) | Jahméne, Arden Hart | Arden Hart | - |

== Photography ==
=== Gabrielle ===
Jahméne first joined Gabrielle on her “Under My Skin” album launch tour in 2018, returning in 2019 to support her once again.

Following this collaboration, Jahméne took on the responsibility of designing Gabrielle’s tour programmes and merchandise for subsequent tours.

Gabrielle’s manager, Lisa Bennington, arranged a photoshoot with Jahméne to capture promotional images for an upcoming Gabrielle tour. Gabrielle selected one of the images to feature as the cover art for her next album, “A Place In Your Heart.”

As a tribute to Gabrielle, Jahméne recorded a version of her song Rise, honouring her artistry and influence.

== Awards ==
Jahmene Douglas was nominated for Best Newcomer at the MOBO Awards in 2013 and performed "Next to Me". Douglas also received a nomination and subsequently won Best Male Newcomer at the Urban Music Awards.

== Discography ==
=== Albums ===
| Title | Album details | Peak chart positions | | | | Certifications |
| Title | Album details | UK | UK R&B | IRE | SCO | Certifications |
|---|---|---|---|---|---|---|
| Love Never Fails | Released: 22 July 2013; Label: RCA Records, Sony Music; Formats: CD, digital download | 1 | — | 30 | 1 | UK: Silver |
| Unfathomable Phantasmagoria | Released: 23 September 2016; Label: Moonshot Music; Formats: CD, digital download | — | 21 | — | — | |

=== EPs - Extended plays ===
| Title | Details |
|---|---|
| Orb | Released: 31 January 2020; Label: Self-released; Formats: Digital download |
| Incomplete | Released: 2 October 2020; Label: Self-released; Formats: Digital download |
| The First Noël | Released: 11 December 2020; Label: Self-released; Formats: Digital download |

=== Singles ===
| Year | Single | Peak chart positions | Album |
| Year | Single | UK | Album |
|---|---|---|---|
| 2013 | "Titanium" | 94 | Love Never Fails |
| 2013 | "Forever Young" | — | Love Never Fails |
| 2015 | "Down for Love" | — | Unfathomable Phantasmagoria |
| 2016 | "Is This the Time?" | — | Unfathomable Phantasmagoria |
| 2016 | "I Wish" | — | Unfathomable Phantasmagoria |
