= Love Never Fails (Jahméne Douglas album) =

Studio album by Jahméne Douglas
- Released: 19 July 2013
- Recorded: 2013
- Genre: Soul, gospel
- Length: 38:51
- Label: Sony, RCA, Syco
- Producer: Graham Stack, Matt Furmidge

Jahméne Douglas chronology
Love Never Fails (2013)	Unfathomable Phantasmagoria (2016)

Singles from Love Never Fails
- 1. "Titanium" Released: 22 July 2013; 2. "Forever Young" Released: 4 November 2013

Love Never Fails is the debut studio album by English singer Jahméne Douglas. It was released in the United Kingdom through RCA Records on 22 July 2013. The album consists entirely of cover versions. The lead single, "Titanium" (originally by David Guetta and Sia), reached number 94 on the UK Singles Chart. The album sold 18,904 copies in its first week and debuted at number one on the UK Albums Chart.

== Background and Recording ==
After finishing as the runner-up of the ninth series of The X Factor on 9 December 2012, there was speculation as to which label Douglas would be signed to. On 19 December, it was announced that he had signed a record deal with Sony Music. On 25 January 2013, it was confirmed that he had signed with RCA Records and would be releasing his debut album in May.

In an interview with Digital Spy, Douglas explained the early meetings with record companies: "The first meeting was about doing a covers album for Mother's Day. I said, 'No thanks, I'd rather walk away now'. There's cheese and then there's cheesy cheese. Hopefully this album is a bit more serious, because of the meaning behind each song.". The album was originally slated for release on 27 May, but was delayed due to Douglas' commitments on the X Factor tour. It ended up being recorded in May in just seven days. Douglas said that "It was originally meant to be released on May 27 – the delay was basically due to me needing to make the album. I think the label forgot that I was on the X Factor tour, so I ended up making it in about week."

On 30 May, Douglas revealed the details of his debut album. He announced that it would be called Love Never Fails and would comprise ten songs – all cover versions. He also revealed that the album would be released in the UK on 22 July 2013 and the lead single would be a cover of David Guetta and Sia's "Titanium". One of the tracks, "The Greatest Love of All", features Douglas's X Factor mentor Nicole Scherzinger. Of the collaboration, Douglas said "Nicole knew this would be one of my favourite songs. And when she sang it with me on the final it was like singing with my big sister. She's so incredibly talented. This song and Nicole ooze class." Douglas also confirmed on 18 June that he had teamed up with Stevie Wonder for his version of Whitney Houston's "Give Us This Day".

== Original Concept ==
When it became clear that a cover album was being strongly encouraged by the label, Jahméne proposed a concept that aligned with his artistic vision and spiritual values. His intention was to reinterpret classic songs through a spiritual lens, collaborating with renowned Gospel artists he deeply admired. The goal was to help bridge the gap between the UK and US Gospel scenes, and to further elevate the profile of Christian music within the UK. The label initially agreed to this creative direction, and Jahméne proceeded to sign the deal.

At the time, Jahméne had already secured high-profile collaborations with Stevie Wonder and Nicole Scherzinger, reinforcing the strength and reach of his concept. Jahméne had also received positive responses from Gospel icon Kim Burrell and Missy Elliott, and had planned to approach other influential artists including Kirk Franklin, Yolanda Adams, CeCe Winans, LaShun Pace, and The Clark Sisters.

However, nearing the end of Jahméne completing recording his contributions to the album, the label abandoned the original concept—likely to expedite the album’s release. This shift was a significant disappointment. In subsequent interviews, Jahméne has expressed that it became increasingly evident the label lacked belief in his artistry from the outset. Despite backing from the legendary Stevie Wonder and him waiving his fee in support of the project — the focus appeared to be more on commercial return than on artistic integrity.

== Promotion ==
Members of the London Community Gospel Choir, along with a five-piece band, joined him on stage, where he performed the majority of his album.

== Chart performance ==
On 25 July 2013, Love Never Fails entered the Irish Albums Chart at number 30. On 28 July, it entered the UK Albums Chart at number one, selling 18,904 copies in its first week. The album was also number one on the Scottish Albums Chart.

== Track listing ==
All music produced by Graham Stack and Matt Furmidge.

Love Never Fails track listing
No.	Title	Writer(s)	Original artist covered	Length
1.	"Fix You"	Chris Martin; Jonny Buckland; Guy Berryman; Will Champion	Coldplay	3:46
2.	"The Greatest Love of All" (featuring Nicole Scherzinger)	Michael Masser; Linda Creed	Whitney Houston	4:47
3.	"His Eye Is on the Sparrow"	Civilla D. Martin; Charles H. Gabriel	Whitney Houston	3:55
4.	"Halo"	Ryan Tedder; Evan Bogart; Beyoncé Knowles	Beyoncé	3:33
5.	"Forever Young"	Bob Dylan	Bob Dylan	3:49
6.	"Give Us This Day" (featuring Stevie Wonder)	Anthony James Vincent Isaacs; Ward Lamar Swingle	Whitney Houston	3:18
7.	"Angel"	Sarah McLachlan	Sarah McLachlan	3:52
8.	"Titanium"	Sia Furler; David Guetta; Giorgio Tuinfort; Nick van de Wall	David Guetta featuring Sia	3:52
9.	"I Look to You"	Robert Kelly	Whitney Houston	4:12
10.	"Next to Me"	Emeli Sandé; Hugo Chegwin; Harry Craze; Anup Paul	Emeli Sandé	3:21

== Charts and certifications ==
=== Weekly charts ===
Chart (2013)	Peak position
Irish Albums (IRMA)	30
Scottish Albums (OCC)	1
UK Albums (OCC)	1

=== Year-end charts ===
Chart (2013)	Position
UK Albums Chart	142

=== Certifications ===
Region	Certification	Certified units/sales
United Kingdom (BPI)	Silver	61,826

== Release history ==
Region	Format	Date	Label
Australia	Digital download	19 July 2013	Sony Music
Austria	Digital download	19 July 2013	Sony Music
France	Digital download	19 July 2013	Sony Music
Germany	CD, digital download	19 July 2013	Sony Music
Ireland	Digital download	19 July 2013	Sony Music
New Zealand	Digital download	19 July 2013	Sony Music
United Kingdom	CD, digital download	19 July 2013	Sony Music
