= Ilan Kidron =

Sydney-based singer and musician (born 1976)

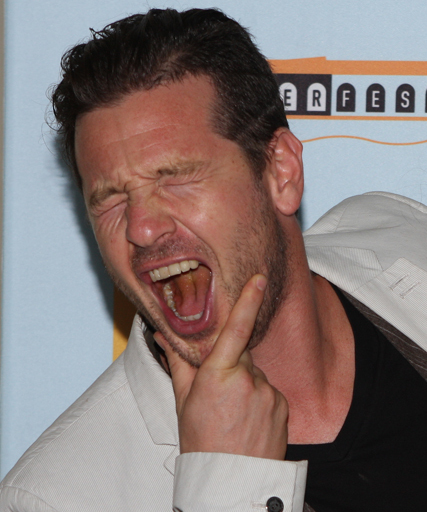
- Kidron in 2013

Background information
- Born: 22 April 1976 (age 50); London, England
- Occupations: Singer, songwriter, musician, producer
- Instruments: Guitar, piano, flute, vocals
- Years active: 2006–present
- Member of: The Potbelleez
- Website: thepotbelleez.com

Ilan Kidron (born 22 April 1976), also known as iKid, is a Sydney-based singer songwriter with over one billion combined streams, best known as the lead singer for Australia's multi-platinum selling dance music act The Potbelleez. As a writer he is a double ASCAP, double APRA award winner and has two Billboard Latin #1s.. Kidron co-wrote The Potbelleez breakthrough single, "Don't Hold Back", which peaked at No. 5 on the ARIA Singles Chart and was certified 3× Platinum by ARIA. Kidron has worked with artists such as Kygo, Rita Ora, Ricky Martin, Chance The Rapper, Hayden James, Chris Brown, Tommy Trash, B.o.B, Sesame Street Paul Mac and Sam La More and publishing/production companies Universal Music Publishing and Norway's Dsign Music.

== Early life and influences ==
Ilan Kidron was born on 22 April 1976 in London, England. During his school life he learned to speak fluently in several languages and, as a classical graduate from the Sydney Conservatorium of Music, Australia, is an accomplished guitarist, flautist and pianist. Kidron studied screen composition at the Australian Film, Television and Radio School and also spent time studying at the International Music Centre Ashram in Varanasi, India.

Kidron plays a wide array of music. Though he comes from a background in "rock, folk, jazz, klezmer and a crooner" music, Kidron moved into dance music when he joined The Potbelleez. When describing his transition to dance, Kidron stated, "You got to find new ways to dig deep and dance music's a really good way of doing that because it's built around tension and release. The song-writing takes on a bigger form with dance music, and it's accentuated by this amazing soundscape."

== Career ==
=== Early career ===
Early in his career, Kidron was part bands Dr Smooth and the Medicine Groove and Dopamine. As part of Dopamine, he won the University of New South Wales Band Competition in 1993. He then moved on to join the band Glass, and did hundreds of performances around Australia.

Kidron spent a few years as multi-instrumentalist for the band, Universe with Steve Balbi. As part of Universe, he released the single Be My Gun in October 1998.

=== The Potbelleez ===
As part of The Potbelleez, Ilan Kidron has released over six Top 50 Hits and two Top 20 Albums. Kidron has received two APRA Song Writing Awards for "Best Dance Work of the Year" for the songs Don't Hold Back and From the Music in 2009 and 2012 respectively.

=== Other works ===
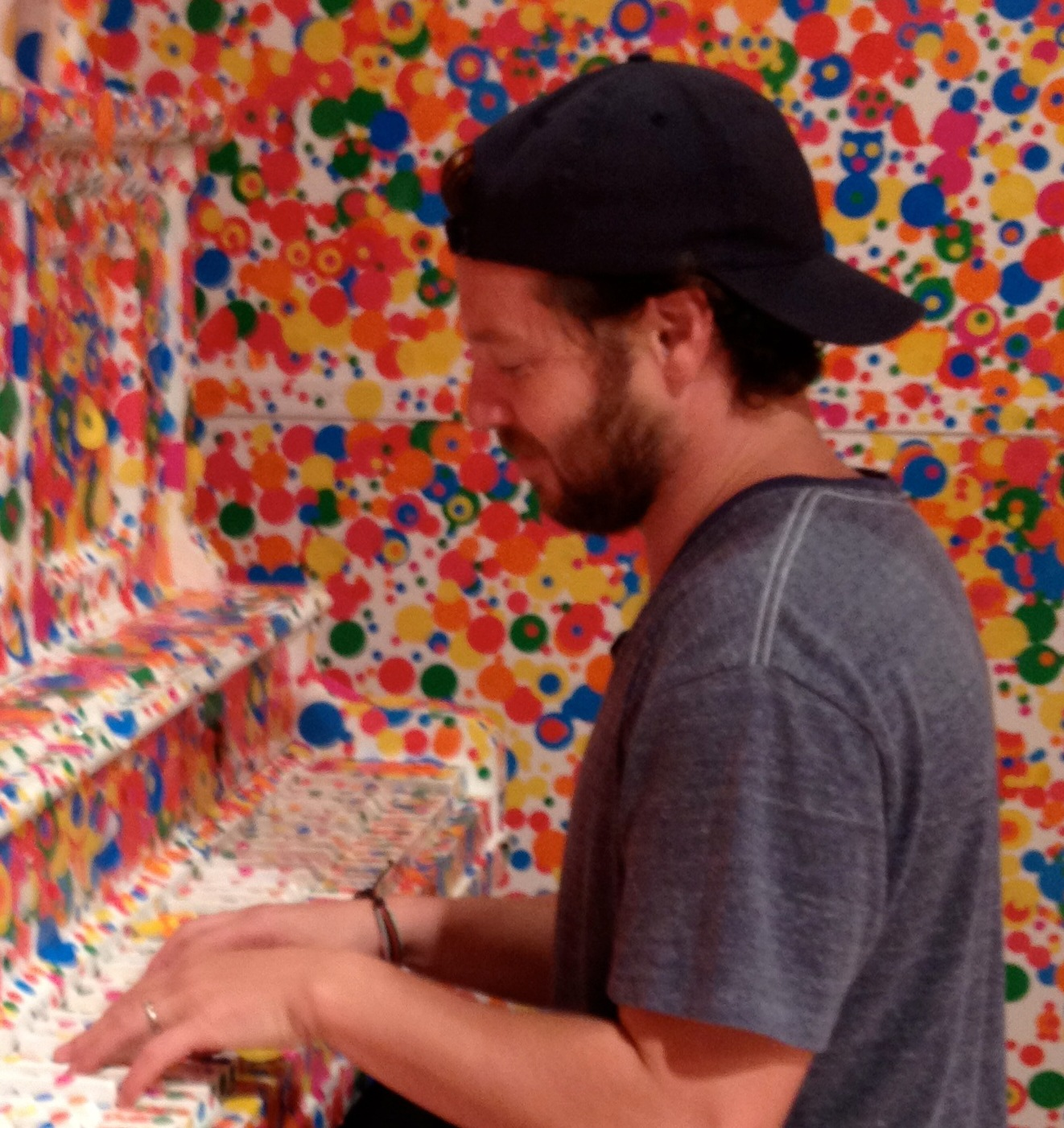
Kidron sitting at a piano

In January 2012, Kidron formed a songwriting and production team, named "The SchooKids", with Dutch producer Louis Schoorl. The team co-wrote and produced the lead single "Gotcha" for the Australian film The Sapphires. The song was performed by Australian singer Jessica Mauboy. The team currently writes for various Australian artists such as Mauboy and Reece Mastin.

Kidron's works include Ricky Martin's "Come with Me", which debuted at No. 3 on the Australian Charts and charted in 17 countries and won an award an award at the ASCAP Latin Music Awards for 'Top Pop Song', Finnish Pop singer Isac Elliot's "New Way Home" which peaked at number one on the Official Finnish Singles Chart. and Australian dance producer Tommy Trash's ARIA nominated hit "Need Me To Stay" which charted at number one on the ARIA Club Hits chart. Kidron also co-wrote Jack Vidgen's "Finding You", Tina Arena's "Love You Less", Vandalism's "Coming Alive", Emma Pask's "Season of My Heart", as well as a few tracks from Ricki Lee's fourth studio album.

In 2014, Kidron formed the side project Go Comet! (stylised as GO COMET!) and released the song "Worlds Apart", which was used to soundtrack Seven News stories. The song reached number 68 on the ARIA Singles Chart in August 2014.

Kidron has also produced sound tracks for films such the Academy Award Nominated Short Film, Inja. 3

== Personal life ==
Kidron was married to the late Samantha Rebillet and has a son, Gabe.

Kidron is an ambassador for the SMILE Foundation Charity as well as an ambassador for the Australasian Performing Right Association. He also supports the Cure Brain Cancer Foundation.

== Discography ==
Composer/Lyricist

2008

- Are You with Me (The Potbelleez)
- Don't Hold Back (The Potbelleez) 2008

2010

- Hello (The Potbelleez)

2011

- From The Music (The Potbelleez)

2012

- Gotcha (Jessica Mauboy)
- Finding You (Jack Vidgen)

2013

- Saved in a Bottle (The Potbelleez)
- Magic Number (The Potbelleez featuring B.o.B)
- Come With Me (Ricky Martin)
- Love You Less (Tina Arena)
- Coming Alive (Vandalism & iKid)
- New Way Home (Isac Elliot)
- Season of My Heart (Emma Pask)

2014

- All We Need Is Love (Ricki-Lee)

2016

- Fire Bird (Miyavi)

2022

- My Satisfaction (Ive)

== Awards and nominations ==
=== APRA Awards ===
The APRA Awards are presented annually from 1982 by the Australasian Performing Right Association (APRA), "honouring composers and songwriters". Kidron has won two awards from six nominations, both for Dance Work of the Year.

Year	Nominee / work	Award	Result
2009	"Don't Hold Back" (David Greene, Ilan Kidron, Jonathan Murphy, Sam Littlemore)	Most Played Australian Work	Nominated
2009	"Don't Hold Back" (David Greene, Ilan Kidron, Jonathan Murphy, Sam Littlemore)	Dance Work of the Year	Won
2009	"Are You With Me" (David Greene, Ilan Kidron, Jonathan Murphy, Sam Littlemore)	Dance Work of the Year	Nominated
2011	"Hello" (Ilan Kidron, Jonathan Murphy, David Greene, Justin Shave, Marisa Lock)	Dance Work of the Year	Nominated
2012	"From the Music" (David Greene, Ilan Kidron, Marisa Lock, Jonathan Murphy, Justin Shave)	Dance Work of the Year	Won
2012	"From the Music" (David Greene, Ilan Kidron, Marisa Lock, Jonathan Murphy, Justin Shave)	Most Played Australian Work	Nominated
2013	"Feed Off Me" (David Greene, Ilan Kidron, Marisa Lock, Paul Mac, Jonathan Murphy, Justin Shave)	Dance Work of the Year	Nominated
2013	"Coming Alive" (Ilan Kidron, Andrew Van, Dorsselaer, Cassandra Van)	Dance Work of the Year	Nominated

=== ARIA Awards ===
The ARIA Music Awards are presented annually from 1987 by the Australian Recording Industry Association (ARIA). Kidron, as part of the Potbelleez, has received four nominations.

Year	Nominee / work	Award	Result
2008	"Don't Hold Back"	Breakthrough Artist – Single	Nominated
2008	"Don't Hold Back"	Best Dance Single	Nominated
2008	"Don't Hold Back"	Highest Selling Single	Nominated
2011	"From the Music"	Best Dance Release	Nominated

=== ASCAP Latin Music Awards ===
Universal Music Publishing announced that Ilan Kidron has won 'Top Pop Song' at the 22nd ASCAP Latin Music Awards in New York City for his work on Ricky Martin's "Come With Me.

Year	Recipient	Award	Result
2014	Come With Me	Top Pop Song	Won
