= From the Music =

Single by the Potbelleez

from the album Destination Now
- Released: 22 March 2011
- Genre: Dance
- Length: 3:10
- Label: Vicious
- Songwriters: David Greene; Ilan Kidron; Marisa Lock; Jonathan Murphy; Justin Shave

The Potbelleez singles chronology
"Shake It" (2010)	"From the Music" (2011)	"Midnight Midnight" (2011)

"From the Music" is a song by the Irish-Australian band the Potbelleez, released on 22 March 2011 as the third single from their second album Destination Now. It was the highest-charting single from the album, peaking at number 16 in Australia and number 35 in New Zealand.

== Track listing ==
iTunes EP

1. "From the Music" (Radio edit) – 3:10
2. "From the Music" (Original Mix) – 6:03
3. "From the Music" (Static Revenger Remix) – 5:32
4. "From the Music" (Sgt Slick Remix) – 6:17
5. "From the Music" (Ryan Riback Remix) – 6:02
6. "From the Music" (Hoxton Whores Remix) – 7:18

== Charts ==
"From the Music" debuted at number 35 on April 24, 2011, before peaking at number 16 on May 15, 2011.

Chart	Peak position
Australian Singles Chart	16
French Singles Chart	66
New Zealand Singles Chart	35

=== Year-end charts ===
Chart (2011)	Position
Australian Singles Chart	95
Australian Artist Singles Chart	9

== Certifications ==
Country	Certification	Sales/units shipped
Australia	Platinum	70,000

== Awards ==
=== ARIA Awards ===
The ARIA Awards are presented annually from 1987 by the Australian Recording Industry Association (ARIA). "From the Music" was nominated for one award.

Year	Nominee / work	Award	Result
2011	"From the Music"	Best Dance Release	Nominated

=== APRA Awards ===
The Australasian Performing Right Association have presented the APRA Awards annually from 1982. "From the Music" was nominated for two awards.

Year	Nominee / work	Award	Result
2011	"From The Music"	Dance Work of the Year	Won
2011	"From the Music"	Most Played Australian Work	Nominated
