= The Potbelleez (album) =

Studio album by The Potbelleez
- Released: 25 October 2008
- Recorded: 2007–2008
- Genre: Dance
- Label: Vicious Vinyl

The Potbelleez chronology
In the Junkyard (2007)	The Potbelleez (2008)	Destination Now (2011)

Singles from The Potbelleez
- 1. "Don't Hold Back" Released: 25 September 2007; 2. "Are You with Me" Released: 7 June 2008; 3. "Trouble Trouble" Released: 18 October 2008; 4. "Duuurty Dreemz" Released: 7 February 2009

The Potbelleez is the self-titled debut album by Australian band the Potbelleez. The first two singles from The Potbelleez, "Don't Hold Back", and "Are You with Me", were both hits. Other singles released include "Trouble Trouble" and "Duuurty Dreemz".

== Track listing ==
Australian version

1. "Trouble Trouble"
2. "Ours to Rock"
3. "Don't Hold Back"
4. "Are You with Me"
5. "Showbiz"
6. "Bad Boy Tune"
7. "Everything"
8. "Hold On"
9. "Crystalize"
10. "Pog Ma Thon"
11. "Junkyard"
12. "Duuurty Dreemz"
13. "Summertime"

Exclusive remix CD

1. "Trouble Trouble" (Carl Kennedy Remix)
2. "Are You with Me" (Mr Timothy Remix)
3. "Don't Hold Back" (Markus Gardweg Remix)
4. "Junkyard" (Vandalism Remix)
5. "Duuurty Dreemz" (Mind Electric Remix)

== Singles ==
- "Don't Hold Back" was released as the first single in late 2007, peaking at No. 5 on the Australian ARIA Singles Chart. It was certified 3 x platinum, and has sold more than 210,000 copies in Australia.
- "Are You with Me" peaked at No. 15 on the Australian Singles Chart.
- "Trouble Trouble" was released to radio in September 2008, and debuted at No. 72 on the Australian Singles Chart, eventually peaking at #54.

== Charts ==
Chart performance for The Potbelleez
Chart (2008)	Peak position
Australian Albums (ARIA)	17
Australian Independent Albums	4

== Release history ==
Country	Release date	Format	Catalogue
Australia	1 November 2008	CD Album	VGLP005CD
