= In the Junkyard =

EP by the Potbelleez
- Released: 28 April 2007 (Australia)
- Genre: Dance
- Label: VV/SHK
- Producer: The Potbelleez

The Potbelleez chronology
In the Junkyard (2007)	The Potbelleez (2008)

Singles from In the Junkyard
- 1. "Junkyard" Released: 2007; 2. "Duurty Dreemz" Released: 2007

In the Junkyard is the debut EP from the Potbelleez. It featured the singles "Junkyard" and "Duurty Dreemz".

== Track listing ==
Australia CD EP

1. "Junkyard" (Radio Edit) – 3:00
2. "Duurty Dreemz" (Radio Edit) – 2:57
3. "Duurty Girl" (12" Mix) – 8:05
4. "Duurty Dreemz" (Electro Funk Lovers Mix) – 6:19
5. "Junkyard" (Vandalism Mix) – 6:37
6. "Duurty Dreemz" (Mind Electric's Not So Duurty Mix) – 8:10

== Chart history ==
In the Junkyard first appeared on the ARIA Club Chart on 27 November 2006. Making its debut at No. 22 and eventually peaking at No. 2. It debuted at No. 23 on the ARIA dance chart before peaking later at No. 18. This was due to a performance on the finale of Big Brother Australia 2007. In the Junkyard also peaked at No. 62 and No. 12 on the ARIA Physical Singles Chart and Australian Artists Charts respectively. "Duurty Dreemz" peaked at No. 20 for two weeks on the ARIA Club Chart. "Junkyard" was featured in commercials for the Kia Soul.

Chart (2007)	Peak position
Australian ARIA Club Chart	2
Australian Artists ARIA Singles	12
Australian ARIA Dance Singles	18
Australian ARIA Physical Singles Chart	62
Australian ARIA Hitseekers Chart	5
