= Hello (The Potbelleez song) =

Single by the Potbelleez

from the album Destination Now
- Released: 21 July 2010
- Genre: Dance
- Length: 3:27
- Label: Vicious
- Songwriter(s): The Potbelleez; Justin Shave

The Potbelleez singles chronology
"Trouble Trouble" (2008)	"Hello" (2010)	"Shake It" (2010)

"Hello" is a song by Australian band the Potbelleez, released on 21 July 2010 as the lead single from their second album Destination Now.

== Appearances in other media ==
- The song was performed live on the 2010 revival of Hey Hey It's Saturday.
- The song was used in an advertising campaign for GO!'s 2011 programming with the slogan Let's GO! 2011.

== Track listing ==
iTunes EP

1. Hello (Radio edit)
2. Hello (Bass Kleph remix)
3. Hello (Angger Dimas Remix)
4. Hello (Sneaker Fox Remix)

== Charts ==
Chart	Peak Position
ARIA Singles Chart	19
ARIA Australian Singles	3
ARIA Digital Singles Chart	21
ARIA Club Chart	9
ARIA Dance Chart	2

=== Certifications ===
Country	Certifications	Sales
Australia	Gold	35,000+
