= The Presets discography =

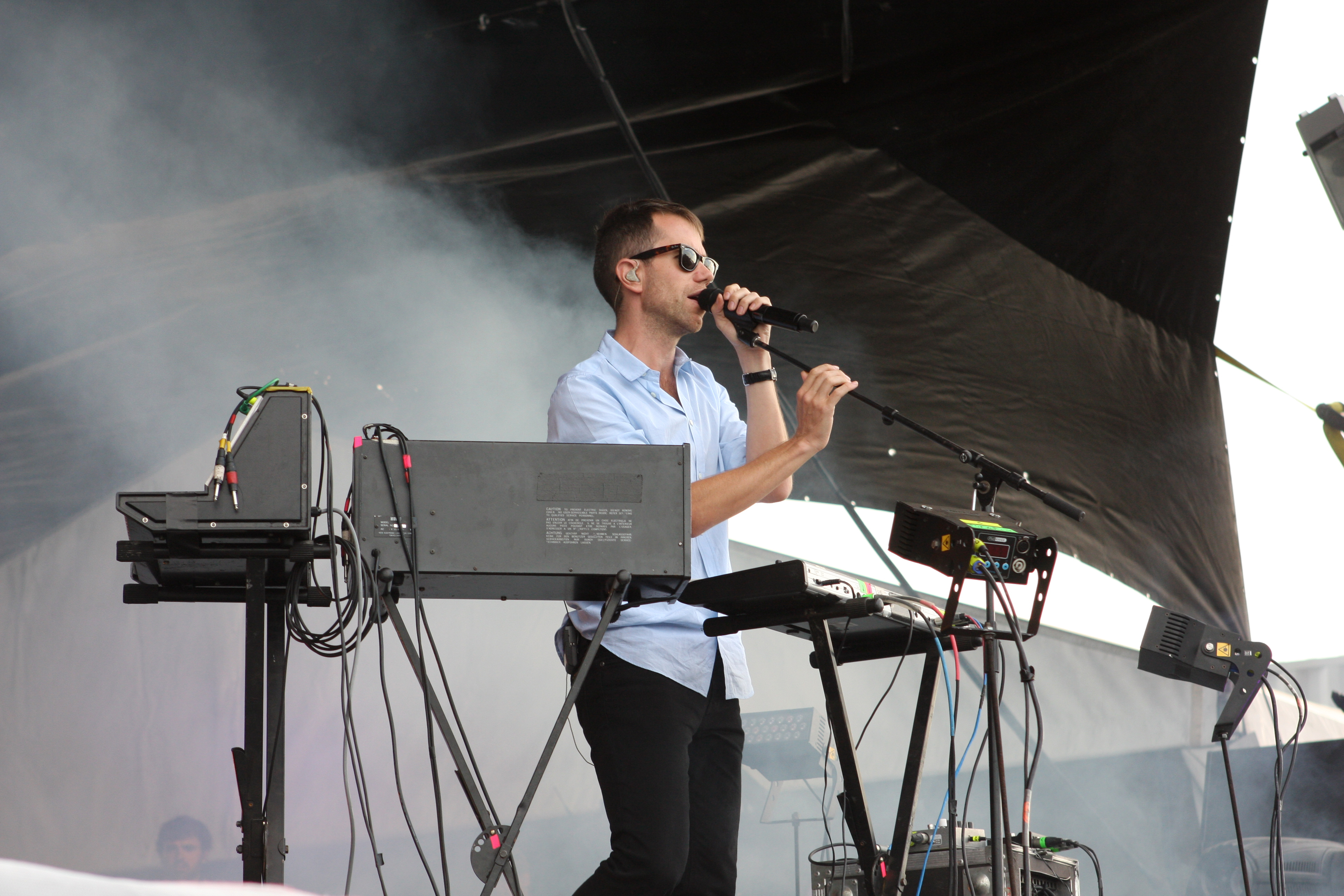
- The Presets and The Future Music Festival 2011
- Studio albums: 4
- EPs: 5
- Singles: 30

The discography of Australian electronic music duo, consists of four studio albums, five extended plays and thirty singles (including six promotional releases).

== Albums ==
=== Studio albums ===
List of studio albums, with selected chart positions and certifications
Title	Album details	Peak chart positions				Certifications
Title	Album details	AUS	NZ	US Heat.	US Dance	Certifications
Beams	Released: 12 September 2005; Label: Modular Recordings; Formats: CD, LP, digital download	55	—	—	—	ARIA: Gold
Apocalypso	Released: 12 April 2008; Label: Modular Recordings; Formats: CD, LP, digital download	1	—	—	—	ARIA: 3× Platinum
Pacifica	Released: 7 September 2012; Label: Modular Recordings; Formats: CD, LP, digital download	3	40	20	11	ARIA: Gold
Hi Viz	Released: 1 June 2018; Label: Modular Recordings; Formats: CD, LP, digital download	5	—	—	—	
"—" denotes a recording that did not chart or was not released in that territory.

== Extended plays ==
List of EPs, with selected chart positions
Title	Album details	Peak chart positions
Title	Album details	AUS
Blow Up	Released: 17 November 2003; Label: Modular Records; Format: CD, LP	—
Girl and the Sea	Released: 1 November 2004; Label: Modular Records; Format: CD	146
iTunes Live from Sydney	Released: 2 December 2008; Label: Modular Records; Format: Digital download	161
No Viz	Released: 16 Aug 2019; Label: Modular Records, EMI; Format: Digital download, streaming	—
Raka (with Golden Features)	Released: 15 November 2019; Label: Modular Records, EMI; Format: Digital download, streaming	—

== Singles ==
List of singles, with selected chart positions and certifications
Title	Year	Peak chart positions				Certifications	Album
Title	Year	AUS	UK physical	US Dance	Triple J Hottest 100	Certifications	Album
"Beat On / Beat Off"	2003	promo	—	—	—		Blow Up
"Girl and the Sea"	2004	promo	—	—	—		Girl and the Sea
"Are You the One?"	2005	68	—	—	—	ARIA: Gold	Beams
"Down Down Down"	2006	promo	71	—	—		Beams
"Steamworks"	2006	promo	—	—	—		Beams
"I Go Hard, I Go Home"	2006	promo	promo	—	—		Beams
"My People"	2007	14	—	—	18	ARIA: 5× Platinum	Apocalypso
"This Boy's in Love"	2008	23	47	25	8	ARIA: 2× Platinum	Apocalypso
"Talk Like That"	2008	19	—	—	6	ARIA: 2× Platinum	Apocalypso
"Yippiyo-Ay"	2008	72	—	—	56	ARIA: Gold	Apocalypso
"If I Know You"	2009	57	—	17	—	ARIA: Gold	Apocalypso
"Kicking and Screaming"	2009	131	—	—	—		Apocalypso
"Youth in Trouble"	2012	—	—	—	—		Pacifica
"Ghosts"	2012	75	—	—	52	ARIA: Gold	Pacifica
"Promises"	2012	120	—	—	70	ARIA: Gold	Pacifica
"Fall"	2013	—	—	—	—		Pacifica
"Push"	2013	promo	—	—	—		Pacifica
"Goodbye Future"	2014	58	—	—	—		—N/a
"No Fun"	2014	108	—	—	—	ARIA: Gold	—N/a
"Remember" (with Steve Angello)	2015	—	—	—	—		Wild Youth
"Do What You Want"	2017	—	—	—	93	ARIA: Gold	Hi Viz
"14U+14ME"	2018	—	—	—	—		Hi Viz
"Downtown Shutdown"	2018	—	—	—	—		Hi Viz
"Martini"	2018	—	—	—	57	ARIA: Platinum	Hi Viz
"Are You Here?" (featuring DMA's)	2018	—	—	—	—		Hi Viz
"Paradise" (with Golden Features)	2019	—	—	—	—	ARIA: Gold	Raka
"Raka" (with Golden Features)	2019	—	—	—	—		Raka
"You Belong"	2022	—	—	—	—		—N/a
"World's Collapsing" (with Willaris. K)	2024	—	—	—	—		Everything Is As It Should Be
"—" denotes a recording that did not chart or was not released in that territory.

=== As featured artist ===
Title	Year	Album
"We Are Impossible" _{(Dillon Francis featuring The Presets)}	2014	Money Sucks, Friends Rule
"Remember" (Steve Angello featuring The Presets)	2016	Wild Youth
"Our People" (3% featuring The Presets)	2023	Kill the Dead

== Remixes ==
- The Dissociatives – "We're Much Preferred Customers" (2004)
- Midnight Juggernauts – "Devil Within" (2005)
- Paul Mac – "It's Not Me, It's You" (2005)
- Caged Baby – "Hello There" (2006)
- Lenny Kravitz – "Breathe" (2006)
- Howling Bells – "Low Happening" (2007)
- Silverchair – "Straight Lines" (2007)
- Architecture in Helsinki – "Heart It Races" (2007)
- Sam Sparro – "Pocket" (2008)
- Sarah Blasko – "Hold on My Heart" (2010)
- Kings of Leon – "Closer" (2010)
- Kylie Minogue – "I Was Gonna Cancel" (2014)
- Rüfüs – "Unforgiven" (2014)
- Röyksopp – "I Had This Thing" (2015)
- Tove Lo – "Sadder Badder Cooler" (2020)
