= Triple J's Hottest 100 of 2008 =

16th edition of annual Australian music poll

2008 Triple J Hottest 100

Countdown details
- Date of countdown: 26 January 2009

Countdown highlights
- Winning song: Kings of Leon "Sex on Fire"
- Most entries: Kings of Leon; Nick Littlemore; Vampire Weekend (4 tracks)

Chronology
← Previous; 2007	Next → 2009 (Of All Time)

The 2008 Triple J Hottest 100 was announced on January 26, 2009. It was the sixteenth countdown of the most popular songs of the year, as chosen by the listeners of Australian radio station, Triple J.

2008 was also the first year of the countdown where Triple J made public the full list of songs that did not make the list proper. Coined as the "Hottest 200", the list was released online the day after the main countdown.

Voting commenced on Boxing Day, 26 December 2008, and closed on 18 January 2009. The second half of the countdown was broadcast live from Parramatta Park in New South Wales, with live crosses to the Big Day Out, held at Flemington Racecourse in Melbourne, Victoria.

Over 800,000 votes were received, a record number at the time.

== Full list ==
Note: Australian artists

#	Song	Artist	Country of origin
1	Sex on Fire	Kings of Leon	United States
2	Electric Feel	MGMT	United States
3	Use Somebody	Kings of Leon	United States
4	Walking on a Dream	Empire of the Sun	Australia
5	Kids	MGMT	United States
6	Talk Like That	The Presets	Australia
7	The Festival Song	Pez featuring 360 and Hailey Cramer	Australia
8	This Boy's in Love	The Presets	Australia
9	That's Not My Name	The Ting Tings	United Kingdom
10	Jimmy Recard	Drapht	Australia
11	My Delirium	Ladyhawke	New Zealand
12	Embrace	Pnau featuring Ladyhawke	Australia/New Zealand
13	The King Is Dead	The Herd	Australia
14	No Sex for Ben	The Rapture	United States
15	Lights & Music	Cut Copy	Australia
16	You Don't Know Me	Ben Folds featuring Regina Spektor	United States
17	Dance wiv Me	Dizzee Rascal featuring Calvin Harris and Chrome	United Kingdom
18	Time to Pretend	MGMT	United States
19	Business Time	Flight of the Conchords	New Zealand
20	Broken Bones	Birds of Tokyo	Australia
21	Skinny Love	Bon Iver	United States
22	Silhouettic	Birds of Tokyo	Australia
23	White Noise	The Living End	Australia
24	Closer	Kings of Leon	United States
25	Never Miss a Beat	Kaiser Chiefs	United Kingdom
26	Paris Is Burning	Ladyhawke	New Zealand
27	The Lighthouse Song	Josh Pyke	Australia
28	That Beep	Architecture in Helsinki	Australia
29	Make You Happy	Josh Pyke	Australia
30	Oxford Comma	Vampire Weekend	United States
31	Bird of Feather	Cog	Australia
32	A-Punk	Vampire Weekend	United States
33	Always Where I Need to Be	The Kooks	United Kingdom
34	Burn Bridges	The Grates	Australia
35	Dig, Lazarus, Dig!!!	Nick Cave & the Bad Seeds	Australia
36	I Will Possess Your Heart	Death Cab for Cutie	United States
37	I Said I'm Sorry	British India	Australia
38	Something Is Not Right with Me	Cold War Kids	United States
39	I Like You So Much Better When You're Naked	Ida Maria	Norway
40	Eye of the Storm	Bliss n Eso	Australia
41	I Will Never Love You More	Soko	France
42	Jungle Drum	Emilíana Torrini	Iceland
43	Ghosts	Laura Marling	United Kingdom
44	Flippers	Art vs. Science	Australia
45	Ice Cream (Triple J live acoustic version)	Muscles	Australia
46	The Fear	Lily Allen	United Kingdom
47	Coca-Cola	Little Red	Australia
48	Stay with Me Bright Eyes	Something with Numbers	Australia
49	Young Love	Mystery Jets featuring Laura Marling	United Kingdom
50	Breakout	Ash Grunwald	Australia
51	Wild Eyed Boy	Birds of Tokyo	Australia
52	Human	The Killers	United States
53	Window and the Watcher	The Butterfly Effect	Australia
54	Baby	Pnau	Australia
55	Your Party	Ween	United States
56	Yippiyo-Ay	The Presets	Australia
57	L.E.S. Artistes	Santogold	United States
58	Cape Cod Kwassa Kwassa	Vampire Weekend	United States
59	Where the City Meets the Sea	The Getaway Plan	Australia
60	The Most Beautiful Girl (In the Room)	Flight of the Conchords	New Zealand
61	The Sea is Rising	Bliss n Eso	Australia
62	Sleepwalking	Faker	Australia
63	2020	The Herd	Australia
64	Dawn of the Dead	Does It Offend You, Yeah?	United Kingdom
65	White Winter Hymnal	Fleet Foxes	United States
66	Farewell Rocketship	Children Collide	Australia
67	Hiphopopotamus vs. Rhymenoceros	Flight of the Conchords	New Zealand
68	We Are the People	Empire of the Sun	Australia
69	Ready for the Floor	Hot Chip	United Kingdom
70	Crawl	Kings of Leon	United States
71	One (Blake's Got a New Face)	Vampire Weekend	United States
72	No One's Gonna Love You	Band of Horses	United States
73	Spaceman	The Killers	United States
74	I'm Not Gonna Teach Your Boyfriend How to Dance with You	Black Kids	United States
75	Half Full Glass of Wine	Tame Impala	Australia
76	Polka	Yves Klein Blue	Australia
77	Falling	Drapht	Australia
78	Shut Up and Let Me Go	The Ting Tings	United Kingdom
79	Jealousy	Sparkadia	Australia
80	Aw Yeah	The Grates	Australia
81	Pork and Beans	Weezer	United States
82	Ulysses	Franz Ferdinand	United Kingdom
83	Carve Your Name	The Grates	Australia
84	Re-Education (Through Labor)	Rise Against	United States
85	1981	Gyroscope	Australia
86	Beautiful Ugly	Muph & Plutonic featuring Jess Harlen	Australia/New Zealand
87	Another Way to Die	Jack White and Alicia Keys	United States
88	The Day That Never Comes	Metallica	United States
89	Love Lockdown	Kanye West	United States
90	Fuck You	Lily Allen	United Kingdom
91	Neopolitan Dreams	Lisa Mitchell	Australia
92	Propane Nightmares	Pendulum	Australia
93	Gobbledigook	Sigur Rós	Iceland
94	Woodstock 2008	Bliss n Eso	Australia
95	Wearing My Rolex	Wiley	United Kingdom
96	Flex (Dave Spoon Reflex)	Dizzee Rascal	United Kingdom
97	Are You Interested?	Cog	Australia
98	I Like It, I Love It	Lyrics Born	United States
99	Don't Worry About Nothin'	Muph & Plutonic featuring Jess Harlen	Australia/New Zealand
100	It's A War	Dukes of Windsor	Australia

=== #101–#200 List ===
For the first time since the 1991 countdown, on 27 January 2009, Richard Kingsmill published the #101–#200 list on his blog.

#	Song	Artist	Country of origin
101	All Alone	Jackson Jackson	Australia
102	Sweet Disposition	The Temper Trap	Australia
103	Everyone's At It	Lily Allen	United Kingdom
104	Social Currency	Children Collide	Australia
105	Inner City Pressure	Flight of the Conchords	New Zealand
106	Wannabe in L.A.	Eagles of Death Metal	United States
107	Computer Love	TZU	Australia
108	Pennywhistle	Augie March	Australia
109	Changes	Van She	Australia
110	Mercury	Bloc Party	United Kingdom
111	Too Much To Do	Sparkadia	Australia
112	Halo	Bloc Party	United Kingdom
113	Weekend Wars	MGMT	United States
114	More News From Nowhere	Nick Cave & the Bad Seeds	Australia
115	Rainbow Kraut	The John Steel Singers	Australia
116	Revelry	Kings of Leon	United States
117	Great DJ	The Ting Tings	United Kingdom
118	Nine in the Afternoon	Panic! at the Disco	United States
119	Det snurrar i min skalle	Familjen	Sweden
120	Leeds United	Amanda Palmer	United States
121	Dusk Till Dawn	Ladyhawke	New Zealand
122	Next in Line	Dead Letter Circus	Australia
123	Happiness	Goldfrapp	United Kingdom
124	Gamma Ray	Beck	United States
125	Discipline	Nine Inch Nails	United States
126	Invaders Must Die	The Prodigy	United Kingdom
127	Talons	Bloc Party	United Kingdom
128	Night Reconnaissance	The Dresden Dolls	United States
129	We Walk	The Ting Tings	United Kingdom
130	Golden Age	TV on the Radio	United States
131	Lost in the Post	The Wombats	United Kingdom
132	Pumpkin Soup	Kate Nash	United Kingdom
133	Let Me See You	Girl Talk	United States
134	Daddy's Gone	Glasvegas	United Kingdom
135	Smash the Piñata	Mammal	Australia
136	Happy In My Hoody	Bliss n Eso featuring Hyjak and Phrase	Australia
137	Skeleton Dance	Children Collide	Australia
138	Kicking and Screaming	The Presets	Australia
139	Backfire at the Disco	The Wombats	United Kingdom
140	Reaction	Dead Letter Circus	Australia
141	Cult Romance	Tom Ugly	Australia
142	Big Jumps	Emilíana Torrini	Iceland
143	Desire Be, Desire Go	Tame Impala	Australia
144	Black Sally	Funkoars featuring Maurice Greer	Australia
145	If I Know You	The Presets	Australia
146	Little Bit	Lykke Li	Sweden
147	M79	Vampire Weekend	United States
148	Your Call	Hermitude featuring Urthboy and Elana Stone	Australia
149	Out There on the Ice	Cut Copy	Australia
150	Clockwork	Phrase	Australia
151	Final Conversation	The Butterfly Effect	Australia
152	Far Away	Cut Copy	Australia
153	Hiroshima (B B B Benny Hit His Head)	Ben Folds	United States
154	How Do We Know	The Living End	Australia
155	White Witch	Birds of Tokyo	Australia
156	Manhattan	Kings of Leon	United States
157	Dark Shades of Blue	Xavier Rudd	Australia
158	Two Doors Down	Mystery Jets	United Kingdom
159	The Youth	MGMT	United States
160	The Devil Called Me A Liar	Ash Grunwald	Australia
161	Kids (Like a Version)	The Kooks	United Kingdom
162	Many Shades of Black	The Saboteurs	United States
163	Say Your Last Goodbye	Cog	Australia
164	He Doesn't Know Why	Fleet Foxes	United States
165	Violet Hill	Coldplay	United Kingdom
166	Which Way to Go	Eddy Current Suppression Ring	Australia
167	Lucid Dreams	Franz Ferdinand	United Kingdom
168	Colour Day Tours	Trial Kennedy	Australia
169	He's a Rocker	The Vines	Australia
170	This Dance is Loaded	British India	Australia
171	5 Years Time	Noah & the Whale	United Kingdom
172	Bowie	Flight of the Conchords	New Zealand
173	Mouthwash	Kate Nash	United Kingdom
174	Milk Eyes	The Grates	Australia
175	Shadows	The Getaway Plan	Australia
176	The Love Me or Die	C. W. Stoneking	Australia
177	You Will Die and I Will Take Over	British India	Australia
178	Got to Do	TZU	Australia
179	Strange Times	The Black Keys	United States
180	Ode to LRC	Band of Horses	United States
181	I Want You	Kings of Leon	United States
182	Turbo Love	Bag Raiders	Australia
183	Strangers	Van She	Australia
184	Fussy	End of Fashion	Australia
185	It's Alright	Little Red	Australia
186	Polite Dance Song	The Bird and the Bee	United States
187	Zug Zug	The Herd	Australia
188	I'm Good, I'm Gone	Lykke Li	Sweden
189	In Step	Girl Talk	United States
190	Half Mast	Empire of the Sun	Australia
191	Geraldine	Glasvegas	United Kingdom
192	Lights Out	Santigold	United States
193	Moment of Truth	Blue King Brown	Australia
194	Something Good 08 (Van She Tech Mix)	Utah Saints	United Kingdom/Australia
195	Mistress Mabel	The Fratellis	United Kingdom
196	All in One	Gyroscope	Australia
197	Strength in Numbers	The Music	United Kingdom
198	In These Hands	The Butterfly Effect	Australia
199	Ladies of the World	Flight of the Conchords	New Zealand
200	Awkward Orchid Orchard	The Boat People	Australia

== Statistics ==
=== Artists with multiple entries ===
#	Artist	Tracks
4	Kings of Leon	1, 3, 24, 70
4	Nick Littlemore (Note: Twice with Empire of the Sun (4, 68) and twice with Pnau (12, 54).)	4, 12, 54, 68
4	Vampire Weekend	30, 32, 58, 71
3	MGMT	2, 5, 18
3	The Presets	6, 8, 56
3	Ladyhawke (Note: Twice solo (11, 26) and once with Pnau (12))	11, 12, 26
3	Flight of the Conchords	19, 60, 67
3	Birds of Tokyo	20, 22, 51
3	Lily Allen (Note: Twice solo (46, 90) and once with the Kaiser Chiefs (25))	25, 46, 90
3	The Grates	34, 80, 83
3	Bliss n Eso	40, 61, 94
2	Empire of the Sun	4, 68
2	The Ting Tings	9, 78
2	Drapht	10, 77
2	Pnau	12, 54
2	Dizzie Rascal	17, 96
2	The Herd	13, 63
2	Cog	31, 97
2	Josh Pyke	27, 29
2	Laura Marling (Note: Once solo (43) and once with Mystery Jets (49))	43, 49
2	The Killers	52, 73
2	Muph and Plutonic	86, 99

=== Countries represented ===
Country	#
Australia	48
United States	29
United kingdom	14
New Zealand	6
Iceland	2
France	1
Norway	1

=== Records ===
- Muscles' song "Ice Cream" charted in the countdown for the second year in a row, with a 'live acoustic' version featuring at No. 45.
- Bliss n Eso's song "Eye of the Storm" (No. 40) samples Angus and Julia Stone's "Paper Aeroplane", which was featured at No. 43 in 2006.
- New Zealand contributed a record 6 entries to the 2008 Hottest 100.
- "Another Way to Die" by Jack White and Alicia Keys is the first James Bond theme song to feature in a Triple J Hottest 100 playlist.
- At the time of the countdown, "Fuck You" by Lily Allen was yet to be officially released, and was only available on Allen's MySpace page, where it was titled "Guess Who Batman". During the countdown, announcers referred to the song as "Guess Who Batman".
- The Butterfly Effect and Jack White, made their sixth consecutive appearance in the Hottest 100, with both artists having featured in every annual countdown since 2003.

== 2008 Triple J Album Poll ==
Bold indicates winner of the Hottest 100. The Presets won the J Award for Apocalypso.

#	Artist	Album	Country of origin	Tracks in the Hottest 100
**1**	**Kings of Leon**	**Only by the Night**	**United States**	1, 3, 24, 70
2	The Presets	Apocalypso	Australia	6, 8, 56 (18 in 2007)
3	MGMT	Oracular Spectacular	United States	2, 5, 18
4	Vampire Weekend	Vampire Weekend	United States	30, 32, 58, 71
5	Birds of Tokyo	Universes	Australia	20, 22, 51
6	Cut Copy	In Ghost Colours	Australia	15 (39 in 2007)
7	Bloc Party	Intimacy	United Kingdom	DNC (110, 112, 127 in Hottest 200)
8	The Grates	Teeth Lost, Hearts Won	Australia	34, 80, 83
9	Empire of the Sun	Walking on a Dream	Australia	4, 68
10	Josh Pyke	Chimney's Afire	Australia	27, 29

== CD release ==
Triple J's Hottest 100 Volume 16 is the compilation featuring the best of the Top 100 voted tracks on two CDs. It went on sale on 6 March 2009.

**CD 1**
1. Kings of Leon – "Sex On Fire" (#1)
2. MGMT – "Kids" (#5)
3. Empire of the Sun – "Walking On A Dream" (#4)
4. The Presets – "Talk Like That" (#6)
5. The Living End – "White Noise" (#23)
6. Kaiser Chiefs – "Never Miss A Beat" (#25)
7. Emiliana Torrini – "Jungle Drum" (#42)
8. Drapht – "Jimmy Recard" (#10)
9. Cut Copy – Lights & Music (#15)
10. Bon Iver – "Skinny Love" (#21)
11. Mystery Jets feat. Laura Marling – "Young Love" (#49)
12. Ladyhawke – "My Delirium" (#11)
13. Dizzee Rascal feat. Calvin Harris and Chrome – "Dance Wiv Me" (#17)
14. Cold War Kids – "Something Is Not Right With Me" (#38)
15. Ida Maria – "I Like You So Much Better When You're Naked" (#39)
16. Art vs. Science – "Flippers" (#44)
17. Little Red – "Coca-Cola" (#47)
18. Bliss n Eso – "Eye of the Storm" (#40)
19. Sigur Rós – "Gobbledigook" (#93)
20. Soko – "I Will Never Love You More" (#41)
21. Santigold – "L.E.S. Artistes" (#57)
22. Children Collide – "Farewell Rocketship" (#66)
23. Cog – "Bird of Feather" (#31)
**CD 2**
1. The Ting Tings – "That's Not My Name" (#9)
2. Nick Cave & The Bad Seeds – "Dig, Lazarus, Dig!!!" (#35)
3. Birds of Tokyo – "Broken Bones" (#20)
4. Architecture In Helsinki – "That Beep" (#28)
5. Vampire Weekend – "Oxford Comma" (#30)
6. Death Cab forCutie – "I Will Possess Your Heart" (#36)
7. Pnau feat. Ladyhawke – "Embrace" (#12)
8. Does It Offend You, Yeah – "Dawn of the Dead" (#64)
9. The Getaway Plan – "Where the City Meets the Sea" (#59)
10. The Grates – "Burn Bridges" (#34)
11. Josh Pyke – "The Lighthouse Song" (#27)
12. Pez feat. 360 & Hailey Cramer – "The Festival Song" (#7)
13. Tame Impala – "Half Full Glass of Wine" (#75)
14. British India – "I Said I'm Sorry" (#37)
15. Lily Allen – "The Fear" (#46)
16. Pendulum – "Propane Nightmares" (#92)
17. Ash Grunwald – "Breakout" (#50)
18. The Herd – "The King Is Dead" (#13)
19. Laura Marling – "Ghosts" (#43)
20. The Butterfly Effect – "Window and the Watcher" (#53)
21. Something With Numbers – "Stay With Me Bright Eyes" (#48)

== DVD Release ==
The 2008 Hottest 100 DVD compilation was released on 10 April 2009.

1. Kings of Leon – "Sex On Fire" (#1)
2. MGMT – "Electric Feel" (#2)
3. Empire of the Sun – "Walking On A Dream" (#4)
4. The Presets – "Talk Like That" (#6)
5. The Ting Tings – "That's Not My Name" (#9)
6. Kaiser Chiefs – "Never Miss A Beat" (#25)
7. Birds of Tokyo – "Broken Bones" (#20)
8. Drapht – "Jimmy Recard" (#10)
9. Ladyhawke – "My Delirium" (#11)
10. Cut Copy – "Lights & Music" (#15)
11. The Herd – "The King Is Dead" (#13)
12. Dizzee Rascal feat. Calvin Harris and Chrome – "Dance Wiv Me" (#17)
13. Nick Cave & The Bad Seeds – "Dig, Lazarus, Dig!!!" (#35)
14. The Living End – "White Noise" (#23)
15. Josh Pyke – "The Lighthouse Song" (#27)
16. Lily Allen – "The Fear" (#46)
17. Architecture In Helsinki – "That Beep" (#28)
18. Vampire Weekend – "Oxford Comma" (#30)
19. The Kooks – "Always Where I Need to Be" (#33)
20. Cog – "Bird of Feather" (#31)
21. The Grates – "Burn Bridges" (#34)
22. PNAU feat. Ladyhawke – "Embrace" (#12)
23. Does It Offend You, Yeah – "Dawn of the Dead" (#64)
24. British India – "I Said I'm Sorry" (#37)
25. Cold War Kids – "Something Is Not Right With Me" (#38)
26. Ida Maria – "I Like You So Much Better When You're Naked" (#39)
27. Emiliana Torrini – "Jungle Drum" (#42)
28. Little Red – "Coca-Cola" (#47)
29. Something With Numbers – "Stay With Me Bright Eyes" (#48)
30. Laura Marling – "Ghosts" (#43)
31. Pez feat. 360 & Hailey Cramer – "The Festival Song" (#7)
32. Mystery Jets feat. Laura Marling – "Young Love" (#49)
33. Ash Grunwald – "Breakout" (#50)
34. The Butterfly Effect – "Window and the Watcher" (#53)
35. The Getaway Plan – "Where the City Meets the Sea" (#59)
36. Santigold – "L.E.S. Artistes" (#57)
37. Bliss n Eso – "The Sea is Rising" (#61)
38. Hot Chip – Ready for the Floor (#69)
39. Death Cab forCutie – "I Will Possess Your Heart" (#36)
40. Faker – "Sleepwalking" (#62)
41. Black Kids – "I'm Not Gonna Teach Your Boyfriend How to Dance with You" (#74)
42. Tame Impala – "Half Full Glass of Wine" (#75)
