= Ghosts (The Presets song) =

- remixes cover

Single by The Presets

from the album Pacifica
- Released: June 2012
- Length: 3:29 / 3:07 (radio edit)
- Label: Modular Recordings
- Songwriters: Julian Hamilton, Kim Moyes

The Presets singles chronology
"Youth in Trouble" (2012)	"Ghosts" (2012)	"Promises" (2012)

"Ghosts" is a song by Australian duo The Presets, released in August 2012 as the second single from their third studio album Pacifica.

The song was voted number 52 in the Triple J Hottest 100, 2012.

At the 2013 Rolling Stone Australia Awards, the song won single of the year.

== Reception ==
Kiel Egging from Music Feeds said "'Whooooooah-ah-oh-ahs' are destined to become ingrained in your head and spark massive singalongs every time it is played live" but added "some people might not dig it as much as others. The lyrics about being a young man and turning into an old one and the deep voices at the end of the verses may get on some people's nerves. And if they were hoping this was going to be a commercial radio hit, well, it doesnt have anywhere near as much shine as 'My People' or 'Talk Like That'."

== Track listings ==
CD single
No.	Title	Length
1.	"Ghosts" (radio edit)	3:07
2.	"Ghosts" (album version)	3:29

remixes
No.	Title	Length
1.	"Ghosts" (radio edit)	3:07
2.	"Ghosts" (album version)	3:29
3.	"Ghosts" (Adrian Lux Is Lost... remix)	6:17
4.	"Ghosts" (Fort Romeau's remix)	5:24
5.	"Ghosts" (Fort Romeau's Burly mix)	5:23
6.	"Ghosts" (Hermitude Trapped in Heaven)	3:12
7.	"Ghosts" (Spinnteklife remix)	3:14
8.	"Ghosts" (Sr. Coconut remix)	4:11

== Charts ==
Chart performance for "Ghosts"
Chart (2012)	Peak position
Australia (ARIA)	75

== Certifications ==
Region	Certification	Certified units/sales
Australia (ARIA)	Gold	35,000^{‡}
^{‡} Sales+streaming figures based on certification alone.
