= If I Know You =

Single by The Presets

from the album Apocalypso
- Released: 23 March 2009
- Recorded: 2007
- Genre: Electro house; synthpop
- Length: 4:28
- Label: Modular
- Songwriter(s): Julian Hamilton; Kim Moyes
- Producer(s): The Presets

The Presets singles chronology
"Yippiyo-Ay" (2008)	"If I Know You" (2009)	"Kicking and Screaming" (2009)

"If I Know You" is a single by The Presets and the fifth taken from their second studio album Apocalypso. It was originally the proposed third single but was replaced by "Talk Like That".

== Content ==
"If I Know You" is a break-up song with a Morrissey-like sexual ambiguity, with a vocal hook reminiscent of the 1980 Split Enz hit "I Hope I Never".

Discussing the lyrics, singer Julian Hamilton told Rolling Stone Australia: "It's a break up song but I didn't want it to be a guy pissed off at a girl because that always sounds so wimpy. I thought it'd be cool to write it from a girl's perspective. The lyrics came out a bit weird and we thought maybe we could flog this off to a girl singer, but then I thought no, this song needs to be sung with balls!"

== Music video ==
The video clip was directed by Eva Husson. The video was awarded Best Dance Video at the 2009 UK Music Video Awards.

== Track listings ==
CD single
No.	Title	Length
1.	"If I Know You" (original)	4:28
2.	"If I Know You" (alternate version)	4:40
3.	"If I Know You" (Vince Clarke Remix)	5:53
4.	"If I Know You" (music video)	3:59

iTunes EP 1
No.	Title	Length
1.	"If I Know You"	4:29
2.	"If I Know You" (alternate version)	4:40
3.	"If I Know You" (Tom Middleton Remix)	5:35
4.	"If I Know You" (Vince Clarke Remix)	5:51
5.	"If I Know You" (Heartbreak Remix)	6:46
6.	"If I Know You" (Tania & Jori Version)	4:55

iTunes EP 2
No.	Title	Length
1.	"If I Know You"	4:29
2.	"If I Know You" (alternate version)	4:40
3.	"If I Know You" (Tom Middleton Remix)	5:34
4.	"If I Know You" (Tom Middleton Instrumental)	7:07
5.	"If I Know You" (Heartbreak Remix)	6:46
6.	"If I Know You" (Vince Clarke Remix)	5:51
7.	"If I Know You" (Chaim Remix)	7:29

== Charts ==
Chart (2009)	Peak position
Australia (ARIA)	57
US Billboard Hot Dance Club Play	17

== Certifications ==
Region	Certification	Certified units/sales
Australia (ARIA)	Gold	35,000^{‡}
^{‡} Sales+streaming figures based on certification alone.

== Release history ==
Region	Date	Label	Format	Catalogue
Australia	23 March 2009	Modular	Digital download	—
Australia	20 April 2009	Modular	CD	MODCDS066
