= Martini (song) =

Single by The Presets

from the album Hi Viz
- Released: 10 August 2018
- Length: 4:00
- Label: Modular Recordings
- Songwriters: Julian Hamilton, Kim Moyes

The Presets singles chronology
"Downtown Shutdown" (2018)	"Martini" (2018)	"Are You Here?" (2018)

"Martini" is a song by Australian duo The Presets, released on 10 August 2018 as the fourth single from their fourth studio album Hi Viz.

Julian Hamilton told Pedestrian TV "'Martini' was a dancer I used to know. She was everything I wasn’t – cool, clear, strong, and with a razor sharp edge I found impossible to resist. In the end, she left me completely undone; a crumbled wreck of a man. “But was it worth it?” I hear you ask...every second."

The song was voted number 57 in the Triple J Hottest 100, 2018.

At the 2019 FBi SMAC Awards, the song was nominated for best song.

== Reception ==
In a live review of the group in June 2018, Chris Button from The AU Review called the song "one of the absolute highlights of the latest record. Particularly during the song's euphoric closing moments, when Hamilton's dreamy falsetto and piano reverb around the room, and each soul within it."

== Certifications ==
Region	Certification	Certified units/sales
Australia (ARIA)	Platinum	70,000^{‡}
^{‡} Sales+streaming figures based on certification alone.
