= Are You the One? (The Presets song) =

Single by The Presets

from the album Beams
- B-side: "Truth and Lies"; "Midnight Boundary"
- Released: 23 October 2005
- Length: 3:26
- Label: Modular (AUS); Universal Island (UK)
- Songwriter(s): Julian Hamilton; Kim Moyes

The Presets singles chronology
"Girl and the Sea" (2004)	"Are You the One?" (2005)	"Down Down Down" (2006)

"Are You the One?" is the lead single by Australian electronic dance music duo The Presets, from their debut studio album Beams. The single backed with non-album tracks "Truth and Lies" and "Midnight Boundary", as well a remix of "Girl and the Sea" by Cut Copy was released on 24 October 2005. The song peaked at No. 68 on the ARIA singles charts.

The UK version of the single (which appeared in early 2006) featured remixes by Simian Mobile Disco and Van She. A remix of the song by French DJ, Lifelike, was commissioned in 2008 to feature in a BMW 1 Series commercial in Australia.

== Reviews ==
A review on Sputnik Music describes the song as "absolutely fanstastic, the best on the album, and the catchiest." Dan Raper at Popmatters states "the beat is a semitone-rumble of distorted fuzz, the vocals, thrown off with the yelp of Green Velvet in “La La Land”, and the chorus is anthemic, defiant, addictive." Marc Hogan at Pitchfork Media however states that it is tuneless and "all hoovering bass and forgettable lyrics".

In 2015, the song was listed at number 41 in In the Mix's 100 Greatest Australian Dance Tracks of All Time with Nick Jarvis calling it "[an] aggressive dance-punk track custom made for sweaty basements" and said "[its] perfectly capturing the keen anticipation and anxiety of a loose night spent getting to know a potential new bedmate."

== Music video ==
The music video, which was directed by Moyes, was nominated for Best Video at the 2006 ARIA Music Awards.

== Track listing ==
All tracks are written by Julian Hamilton and Kim Moyes, except "Girl and the Sea" written by Julian Hamilton, Kim Moyes and Samuel Dixon.

CD single
No.	Title	Length
1.	"Are You the One?"	3:26
2.	"Girl and the Sea" (Cut Copy Remix)	6:40
3.	"Truth and Lies"	4:04
4.	"Midnight Boundary"	3:22

12" vinyl
No.	Title	Length
1.	"Are You the One?" (Club Edit)
2.	"Are You the One?" (Original Edit)
3.	"Are You the One?" (Simian Mobile Disco Remix)
4.	"Are You the One?" (Van She Tech NYC Rush Mix)

== Charts ==
Chart performance for "Are You the One?"
Chart (2005)	Peak position
Australia (ARIA)	68

== Certifications ==
Region	Certification	Certified units/sales
Australia (ARIA)	Gold	35,000^{‡}
^{‡} Sales+streaming figures based on certification alone.

== Release history ==
Region	Date	Label	Format	Catalogue
Australia	23 October 2005	Modular	Digital download	—
Australia	24 October 2005	Modular	CD	MODCDS024
Various	2006	Modular	7" Vinyl, 12" Vinyl	MODVL021
Germany	2006	International Deejay Gigolo Records	7" Vinyl, 12" Vinyl	GIGOLO 198
