= Do What You Want (The Presets song) =

Single by The Presets

from the album Hi Viz
- Released: 3 November 2017
- Length: 3:01
- Label: Modular Recordings
- Songwriters: Julian Hamilton, Kim Moyes

The Presets singles chronology
"Remember" (2015)	"Do What You Want" (2017)	"14U+14ME" (2018)

"Do What You Want" is a song by Australian duo The Presets, released in November 2017 as the lead single from their fourth studio album Hi Viz.

Upon release, the duo said "We struggled with this track for a couple of years do get it right - there's 60 other versions. We wanted to make a techno version of an Aussie pub rock song, like the Angels or something", though, they admit "we've always been doing that."

The music video was directed by Kris Moyes and released on 6 December 2017. At the 2018 ARIA Music Awards, it was nominated for Best Video.

== Reception ==
Dom Alessio from Triple J's Home & Hosed said "It's dumb fun but it's cleverly constructed. The tones, the beat, the chugging guitars, the vocal that you think will be annoyingly repetitive but damn it if it isn't already stuck in your head: it works."

Gen Fricker from Triple J's Drive said "I think it's the driving crank of the guitars with an unrelenting beat that makes 'DWYW' a dark, menacing thumper you can dance to."

Zane Rowe from Triple's J's said "While I haven’t fallen head over heels for this at first listen... I just know this is gonna worm it's [sic] way in and live deep under my skin in no time."

Emma Jones from The Music described the song as "A guttural, thumping rave that strangely pays homage to Australian pub rock while being one of the most exciting dance songs to be released this year."

== Track listing ==
digital single
No.	Title	Length
1.	"Do What You Want"	3:01

digital single (remixes)
No.	Title	Length
1.	"Do What You Want" (Dense & Pika remix)	6:28
2.	"Do What You Want" (Dense & Pika dub)	6:28
3.	"Do What You Want" (Skylar Spence remix)	4:37
4.	"Do What You Want" (Skylar Spence dub)	4:37

== Certifications ==
Region	Certification	Certified units/sales
Australia (ARIA)	Gold	35,000^{‡}
^{‡} Sales+streaming figures based on certification alone.
