= Youth in Trouble =

Single by The Presets

from the album Pacifica
- A-side: "Youth in Trouble"
- Released: 29 June 2012
- Genre: EDM; Electropop
- Length: 6:20
- Label: Modular (AUS); Universal Island (Europe)
- Songwriters: Julian Hamilton, Kim Moyes

The Presets singles chronology
"Kicking and Screaming" (2009)	"Youth in Trouble" (2012)	"Ghosts" (2012)

"Youth in Trouble" is the first single released by Australian duo The Presets, from their third studio album Pacifica. The single backed with a number of remixes, including a version by US producer Curtis Jones (aka Green Velvet) and British DJ Alex Metric. It was released as a digital download on 29 June 2012. The song peaked at No. 13 on the ARIA Club Tracks chart.

== Reviews ==
Andrew Nock in the digital music and lifestyle magazine, Music Feeds, describes the song as being "dark and brooding" yet drawing "similarity to techno legends Underworld". He goes onto praise it for "its disregard of stereotypical dance music conventions" and that it "deceiving the listner in that it never reaches the peak that it promises to delive, but rather drives the song to a monstrous climax."

David Young in Sputnik Music states that it "is a cauldron-bubble of inner-city paranoia, whirring synthesizer and a pulsing beat that grows more claustrophobic and agitated until roughly the last ninety seconds or so, in which the track more or less explodes into technicolour."

Mess+Noise's Andrew Fletcher considers the song as brooding and undulating with an impeccable "sense of timing and structure". Whilst Craig Mathieson in FasterLouder states "Hamilton's stentorian voice is present from the opening jangled nerves excursion into minimalist techno, but the more variety he brings to his vocal delivery the greater the contrast with the tracks where he’s still barking out every exclamation.

== Music video ==
The six-minute music video was directed by New York-based visual artist Yoshi Sodeoka. The video is straight pixelated chaos, with images of riots, fights and cheerleading competitions seen through the lens of a broken first-generation PlayStation.

== Track listing ==
All music is composed by The Presets

Youth in Trouble – iTunes single
No.	Title	Length
1.	"Youth in Trouble"	6:20

Youth in Trouble (Remixes) – iTunes single
No.	Title	Length
1.	"Youth in Trouble" (Green Velvet Remix)	8:10
2.	"Youth in Trouble" (The Finger Prince and Light Year Remix)	6:29
4.	"Youth in Trouble" (Alex Metric Remix)	5:44

No.	Title	Length
1.	"Youth in Trouble"	6:20
2.	"Youth in Trouble" (Green Velvet Remix)	8:10
3.	"Youth in Trouble" (The Finger Prince and Light Year Remix)	6:29
4.	"Youth in Trouble" (Alex Metric Remix)	5:44

== Release history ==
Region	Date	Label	Format	Catalogue
Australia	29 June 2012	Modular	Digital	MRTPYIT001B
