= Down Down Down (The Preset song) =

Single by The Presets

from the album Beams
- Released: 8 May 2006
- Length: 3:19
- Label: Modular Recordings / Island Records
- Songwriter(s): Julian Hamilton, Kim Moyes

The Presets singles chronology
"Are You the One?" (2005)	"Down Down Down" (2006)	"Steamworks" (2006)

"Down Down Down" is a song by Australian duo The Presets. It was released as a promotional single in Australia in 2005 and as a commercial single in the United Kingdom on 8 May 2006, as the second single from their debut studio album Beams.

== Track listing ==
CD single (Modular Recordings – 9878595, Island Records – CID 932)
No.	Title	Length
1.	"Down Down Down"	3:19
2.	"Down Down Down" (Digitalism remix)	7:12
3.	"Cookie"	2:57

7" single (Modular Recordings – 9878594, Island Records – IS 932)
No.	Title	Length
1.	"Down Down Down"	3:19
2.	"Down Down Down" (Bumblebeez remix)

== Charts ==
Chart performance for "Down Down Down"
Chart (2006)	Peak position
UK Physical Singles (OCC)	71
UK Singles (OCC)	158
