= Blow Up (EP) =

EP by The Presets
- Released: 17 November 2003
- Genre: Dance
- Length: 27:25
- Label: Modular
- Producer: Julian Hamilton; Kim Moyes

The Presets chronology
Blow Up (2003)	Girl and the Sea (2004)

Singles from Blow Up
- 1. "Beat On / Beat Off" Released: 2003 (radio-only)

Blow Up is an EP and the debut release by Australian electronic dance music duo The Presets, released in November 2003 by record label Modular. "Beat On / Beat Off" was released to radio as a single and received airplay on Triple J.

In December 2019, a limited edition vinyl was released.

== Production and content ==
Blow Up was written, recorded, produced, mixed and engineered by Presets members Julian Hamilton and Kim Moyes. It is considered a demo recording. Silverchair's vocalist and lead guitarist Daniel Johns guests on three tracks and co-wrote the song "Cookie" with the duo.

== Reception ==
Australian Music Online described the release as "a dirty dark soundtrack to sweaty clubs that reeked of sex and sweat and [...] was electro pop delivered with rock'n'roll aggression." Jose Solis of PopMatters wrote that the EP "announced the arrival of an act that was unafraid to get down and dirty when it came to mixing rock beats with pulsating electronic tempo, something that has become the norm as EDM and electronica become the most popular music genres around".

== Track listing ==
All tracks are written by The Presets (Julian Hamilton and Kim Moyes), except as noted.

No.	Title	Lyrics	Length
1.	"Let's Go"		3:43
2.	"Get the Fuck Outta Here"		3:03
3.	"Cookie"	Hamilton, Daniel Johns, Moyes	2:58
4.	"Waiting for You"		4:53
5.	"At a Loss"		4:34
6.	"Beat On / Beat Off"		3:47
7.	"Pretty Little Eyes"		4:32
Total length:			27:25

== Release history ==
Region	Date	Label	Format	Catalogue
Australia	17 November 2003	Modular	CD	MODEP008
Australia	December 2019	Modular	12" LP	7759395
