= Modular Presents: Leave Them All Behind 2 =

Compilation album by Various artists
- Released: 17 February 2007
- Label: Modular

Leave Them All Behind chronology
Modular Presents: Leave Them All Behind (2006)	Modular Presents: Leave Them All Behind 2 (2007)

Modular Presents: Leave Them All Behind 2 is the 2007 double-disc follow-up to Modular Recordings' 2005 dance-rock compilation Modular Presents: Leave Them All Behind. Similar to that compilation, Disc 1 is mixed while Disc 2 is unmixed.

== Track listing ==
Disc 1

1. "Let's Make Love And Listen To Death From Above" by Cansei de Ser Sexy – 2:15
2. "Standing In The Way Of Control" by The Gossip – 2:53
3. "Sister Self Doubt" by The Shakes – 2:06
4. "The Boy Who Ran Away (Riton Re-Rub)" by Mystery Jets – 3:02
5. "Skip To The End (Digitalism Re-Rub)" by The Futureheads – 4:36
6. "Gravity's Rainbow (Van She Remix)" by Klaxons – 2:39
7. "Woman (MSTRKRFT Remix)" by Wolfmother – 3:27
8. "Are You The One? (Club Mix)" by The Presets – 3:12
9. "Street Justice" by MSTRKRFT – 3:15
10. "Let My Shoes Lead Me Forward (The Knife Remix)" by Jenny Wilson – 2:57
11. "Cheated Hearts (Peaches Remix)" by Yeah Yeah Yeahs – 1:32
12. "Waters Of Nazareth" by Justice – 4:08
13. "Going Nowhere (Sebastian Remix)" by Cut Copy – 1:25
14. "K-Hole" by Ali Love – 3:11
15. "The Chills" by Peter Bjorn and John – 2:23
16. "Gold Lion" by Yeah Yeah Yeahs – 3:04
17. "Talk Talk Talk Talk" by Love Is All – 1:54
18. "Change Channel" by Lo-Fi-Fnk – 2:54
19. "Binary Love (Loving Hand Remix)" by The Rakes – 4:12
20. "Boy From School (Erol Alkan's Extended Re-Work)" by Hot Chip – 4:48

Disc 2

1. "Ice Cream" by New Young Pony Club – 3:09
2. "Girlkillsbear (Lo-Fi-Fnk Remix)" by Softlightes – 4:37
3. "Let My Shoes Lead Me Forward" by Jenny Wilson – 2:57
4. "Loneliness Shines" by Malcolm Middleton – 4:16
5. "Ladyflash (Simian Mobile Disco Remix)" by The Go! Team – 6:04
6. "Let's Make Love And Listen To Death From Above" by CSS – 3:32
7. "Sister Self Doubt" by The Shakes – 4:22
8. "Bossy (Alan Braxe & Fred Falke Remix)" by Kelis – 5:41
9. "Get Myself Into It" by The Rapture – 4:40
10. "The Boy Who Ran Away (Riton Re-Rub)" by Mystery Jets – 3:58
11. "Outsiders (JD Twitch & The Truffle Club's Optimo Refreak)" by Franz Ferdinand – 5:47
12. "Love Train (Chicken Lips Remix)" by Wolfmother – 5:46
13. "Binary Love (Loving Hand Remix)" by The Rakes – 7:54
14. "I Don't Feel Like Dancin' (Erol Alkan's Carnival Of Light Rework)" by Scissor Sisters – 8:13
