= Modular Presents: Leave Them All Behind =

Compilation album by Various artists
- Released: 10 January 2006
- Label: Modular

Leave Them All Behind chronology
Modular Presents: Leave Them All Behind (2006)	Modular Presents: Leave Them All Behind 2 (2007)

Modular Presents: Leave Them All Behind is a double disc sampling of some of the big names in 2005 in dance-rock, indie-rock, dance-punk, post-punk and the like. Put together by the Australian label Modular Recordings, the compilation has 32 original and remix versions of tracks by artists such as Bloc Party ("Banquet"), Death From Above 1979 ("Romantic Rights"), The Killers ("Mr. Brightside") and Cut Copy ("Bright Neon Payphone"). Disc 1 is continuously mixed by the Modular DJs, while Disc 2 is unmixed.

== Track listing ==
Disc 1

1. "Retreat" by The Rakes
2. "Bright Neon Payphone" by Cut Copy
3. "Romantic Rights (Erol Alkan Remix)" by Death From Above 1979
4. "Giddy Stratospheres" by The Long Blondes
5. "Poor Innocent Boys" by Cazals
6. "Transpiralo" by Panico
7. "Banquet (Phones Disco Edit)" by Bloc Party
8. "I See You" by Rubicks
9. "Single Again" by Fiery Furnaces
10. "I Ain't Saying Goodbye" by Tom Vek
11. "Leave Them All Behind" by Whitey
12. "45 & Rising (Cut Copy Remix)" by Midnight Juggernauts
13. "Me & My Man (Whitey Remix)" by Chromeo
14. "Shake Off" by Kiki & Silversurfer (featuring Captain Comatose)
15. "You Take My Breath Away (Mylo Remix)" by The Knife
16. "Girl & The Sea (Cut Copy Remix)" by The Presets
17. "Good Ones (Jagz Kooner Remix)" by The Kills
18. "Mr Brightside" by The Killers

Disc 2

1. "Banquet (Phones Remix)" by Bloc Party
2. "Leave Them All Behind" by Whitey
3. "Giddy Stratosphere" by Long Blondes
4. "Shake Off" by Kiki & Silversurfer
5. "The Retreat (Phones Mix)" by The Rakes
6. "Poor Innocent Boys" by The Cazals
7. "Transpiralo" by Panico
8. "Night On Fire (Cut Copy Remix)" by VHS or Beta
9. "Summer Of Love" by Presets
10. "Needy Girl (Paper Faces Remix)" by Chromeo
11. "E Talkin (Tiga remix)" by Soulwax
12. "Single Again" by Fiery Furnaces
13. "Dance Me In (Optimo Mix)" by Sons and Daughters
14. "Romantic Rights (Erol Alkan Remix)" by Death From Above 1979
