= My People (song) =

2007 single by the Presets

Single by the Presets

from the album Apocalypso
- Released: 4 December 2007
- Genre: Electropop; dance-punk
- Length: 4:31 (album version); 3:49 (radio edit)
- Label: Modular
- Songwriters: Julian Hamilton; Kim Moyes
- Producer: The Presets

The Presets singles chronology
"I Go Hard, I Go Home" (2006)	"My People" (2007)	"This Boy's in Love" (2008)

"My People" is the first single from Australian electronic music duo the Presets' second album Apocalypso. The song was nominated for two ARIA Awards, Single of the Year and Best Video (Kris Moyes). It won the latter.

On 26 October 2008—a week after their multiple ARIA Awards wins—"My People" jumped up 38 spots from number 52 to 14 on the Australian ARIA Singles Chart, surpassing its previous peak of 19. The song spent 27 weeks in the ARIA Top 50. Channel [V] Australia named the song as the second biggest hit of 2008, behind only "Low" by Flo Rida. On 26/27 October 2008, "My People" made its return to the Australian ARIA Singles Chart, peaking higher at number 14. This chart rebound was partly due to the Presets' appearance at the 2008 ARIA Awards a week earlier.

== Background ==
The song was written by Julian Hamilton about asylum seekers in Australian detention centres. "I wanted to write a song about [...] this horrible phenomenon where people come out here in search of a better life and we lock them up. I felt so horrible about the way we treat these destitute people that I wanted to write a desperate-sounding song – the line 'let me hear you scream if you're with me' could be understood to come from the perspective of someone who is locked up, needing to hear that there are people outside who are behind him and supporting him."

Kim Moyes said "In a lot of ways [the song is] a 'mega-mix' of three or four Presets ideas and it's a really glued-together, solid Presets [song]. It's very informed by the touring process and crowd reactions." The song is written in the key of F minor and is in the Phrygian mode, and follows the chord progression of Fm–Gb–Ebm–Fm. The song was mixed by John Fields at Wishbone Studio of North Hollywood, CA.

== Legacy ==
Despite its eventual success, the group initially had doubts if radio would play it due to the track's heaviness. Kim Moyes told Rolling Stone Australia: "I remember when we played it to our record company and they were like 'we love it but how the heck are we going to get this on the radio?' There were even doubts about how much Triple J would get behind it, let alone any commercial stations."

will.i.am from American hip hop group The Black Eyed Peas, in an interview with Billboard magazine about their album The E.N.D, remarked that "the album had been inspired by a trip to Australia, specifically the sound of The Presets' 'My People'. [...] The energy on the Presets' small little stage was crazy energy. That song 'My People' [he sings the chorus] - that [...] is wild. That's the reason why this record sounds the way it does - my three months in Australia."

In 2015, the song was listed at number 2 in In the Mix's '100 Greatest Australian Dance Tracks of All Time' with Nick Jarvis saying "The Presets took Australian indie-dance from the distant corners of the internet and street press magazines, and blasted it onto prime time radio and television, and from the main stages at mainstream festivals. And this was the song that did it."

In 2025, the song placed 55 on the Triple J Hottest 100 of Australian Songs.

== Track listings ==
1. "My People"
2. "My People" (Kris Menace Remix)
3. "My People" (D.I.M. Remix)

Australian CD single

1. "My People"
2. "My People" (Kris Menace Remix)
3. "My People" (D.I.M. Remix)
4. "My People" (Mouse on Mars Acid Pretzels Remix)
5. "My People" (Music video)

Note: In Australia, radio stations were issued with a 'radio edit' (3:49) promo CD single.

== Charts ==
=== Weekly charts ===
Chart (2007–08)	Peak position
Australia (ARIA)	14
Australian Physical Singles (ARIA)	22
Australian Digital Track Chart (ARIA)	15
Australian Club Chart (ARIA)	1
Australian Artist Singles (ARIA)	2
Australian Independent Records Singles (AIR)	2

=== Year-end charts ===
Chart (2008)	Position
Australia (ARIA)	41

== Certifications ==
Region	Certification	Certified units/sales
Australia (ARIA)	5× Platinum	350,000^{‡}
^{‡} Sales+streaming figures based on certification alone.

== Usage and covers ==
This song's popularity has resulted in it being played frequently across the media.

- The song was frequently used during Channel Seven's coverage of the 2008 Beijing Olympics.
- It was used to promote the 2008/09 Hyundai A-League season.
- It was also used to promote the 2008 ARIA Awards, which was broadcast on Network Ten.
- "My People" can also be heard during Brisbane Broncos home matches, Sydney Swans home and finals matches, as well as at some NRL, AFL and BBL games.
- In 2009, "My People" was sampled by Australian hip hop artist Phrase in his song "Phrase Meets The Presets". A music video was also created by DJ Flagrant to accompany it.
- It featured at the end of the Formula One broadcasts on Network Ten along with Daryl Beattie Shannon's commercials.
- It was used at halftime of the Hawthorn vs St Kilda preliminary final broadcast on Network Ten.
- It was repeated frequently during the 2008 Rugby League World Cup.
- Used in the pre-game promo of the Hawthorn vs Geelong match in round 1, 2009. Effects from the video clip were also used in this promo.
- It was used in a Superheroes advertisement for Channel V.
- The song has been played every year from its release during Brisbane RiverFire as the F-111 fighter jets approached and flew overhead, commencing their dump-and-burn.
- Used on an episode of Top Gear when Richard Hammond reviewed the Vauxhall VXR8 Bathurst and the Holden HSV Maloo Ute.
- In October 2023, 3%'s debut single "Our People", sampling "My People", was released. It won Song of the Year at the National Indigenous Music Awards 2024.
