= Pacifica (The Presets album) =

Studio album by The Presets
- Released: 7 September 2012
- Genres: Electronic; electropop; house; synth-pop; EDM
- Length: 48:40
- Label: Modular
- Producer: The Presets

The Presets chronology
Apocalypso (2008)	Pacifica (2012)	Hi Viz (2018)

Singles from Pacifica
- 1. "Youth in Trouble" Released: 29 June 2012; 2. "Ghosts" Released: 4 August 2012; 3. "Promises" Released: 28 September 2012; 4. "Fall" Released: 10 May 2013; 5. "Push" Released: 3 June 2013 (promo)

Pacifica is the third studio album by Australian electronic duo The Presets. The album was released in Australia by Modular Recordings on 7 September 2012. The album features the singles "Youth in Trouble", "Ghosts", "Promises", "Fall" and "Push". The album was Triple J's Feature Album.

At the J Awards of 2012, the album was nominated for Australian Album of the Year.

== Background and release ==
The Presets recorded the album in Sydney and Los Angeles. The bulk of the album was recorded at the home studios of Julian Hamilton and Kim Moyes, with additional drum sessions taking place in Los Angeles with Joe Baressi and Sean Beavan. The Presets returned to Los Angeles to mix the album with Tony Hoffer.

Writing sessions for the album began as early as 2009. The band worked on as many as 30 songs towards the album. However it was towards the end of 2011 that the bulk of sessions came together.

Pacifica was released in Australia on 7 September 2012. In Australia the album was released on compact disc (the first pressing with a lenticular sleeve), gatefold vinyl album, deluxe box set (featuring, CD, vinyl album, lithograph and expanded artwork), and digital download.

== Critical reception ==
Professional ratings
Aggregate scores
Source	Rating
Metacritic	61/100
Review scores
Source	Rating
AllMusic	3.5/5 stars
The AU Review	9/10 stars
The Australian	4/5 stars
Consequence of Sound	4/5 stars
Herald Sun	4.5/5 stars
The Sydney Morning Herald	4/5 stars

== Track listing ==
All tracks are written by The Presets.

No.	Title	Length
1.	"Youth in Trouble"	6:20
2.	"Ghosts"	3:29
3.	"Promises"	4:58
4.	"Push"	4:02
5.	"Fall"	3:57
6.	"It's Cool"	3:58
7.	"A.O."	6:13
8.	"Surrender"	4:16
9.	"Fast Seconds"	5:14
10.	"Fail Epic"	5:57

Pacifica – Japan bonus track
No.	Title	Length
11.	"So Far So Good"	3:45

Pacifica – iTunes deluxe
No.	Title	Length
11.	"So Far So Good"	3:45
12.	"Youth in Trouble" (Green Velvet Remix)	8:10
13.	"Ghosts" (Fort Romeau Burly Man Remix)	5:23
14.	"Promises" (Lifelike Remix)	7:53
15.	"Fall" (SymbolOne Remix)	5:03
16.	"It's Cool" (Andrew Bayer & James Grant Remix)	7:15
17.	"Heart of the Heart"	4:26
18.	"Youth in Trouble" (Alex Metric Remix)	5:44
19.	"Ghosts" (Senor Coconut Remix)	4:10
20.	"Promises" (Plastic Plates Remix)	5:28
21.	"Fall" (Hook n Sling Remix)	5:58
22.	"Promises" (Nils Frahm Version)	4:10

Pacifica Remixes – UK disc 2
No.	Title	Length
1.	"Youth in Trouble" (Green Velvet Remix)
2.	"Ghosts" (Fort Romeau's Burly Remix)
3.	"Promises" (Lifelike Remix)
4.	"Fall" (SymbolOne Remix)
5.	"Youth in Trouble" (Alex Metric Remix)
6.	"Ghosts" (Senor Coconut Remix)
7.	"Promises" (Plastic Plates Remix)
8.	"Fall" (Hook n Sling Remix)
9.	"Promises" (Nils Frahm Rework)

== Album credits ==
- Joe Barresi – engineer
- Sean Beavan – engineer
- Chris Claypool – assistant
- Dave Cooley – mastering
- Glen Goetze – A&R
- Julian Hamilton – engineer, producer
- Tony Hoffer – additional production, mixing
- Analiese Ifould – stylist
- Wade Keighran – engineer
- Will Larnach-Jones – management
- Kim Moyes – engineer, producer
- Jun Murakawa – assistant
- Jon Nicholson – drum technician
- Jonathan Zawada – art direction, design

== Charts ==
=== Weekly charts ===
Chart (2012)	Position
Australian Albums (ARIA)	3
New Zealand Albums (RMNZ)	40

=== Year-end charts ===
Chart (2012)	Position
Australian Albums (ARIA)	96

== Release history ==
Region	Date	Label	Format	Catalogue
Australia	7 September 2012	Modular	CD, vinyl, digital download, Deluxe Box Set	MODCD158
US	11 September 2012	Casablanca	CD, LP, digital download	B0017366-02
UK	17 September 2012	Modular	CD, digital download	MODVL158DLX
Japan	12 September 2012	Pachinko Records	CD, digital download	
