= APRA Music Awards of 2009 =

Annual Australian music awards

- Date: 23 June 2009
- Location: The Peninsula; Melbourne, Australia

The Australasian Performing Right Association Awards of 2009 (generally known as APRA Awards) are a series of awards which include the APRA Music Awards, Classical Music Awards, and Screen Music Awards. The APRA Music Awards ceremony occurred on 23 June at the Peninsula in Melbourne, they were presented by APRA and the Australasian Mechanical Copyright Owners Society (AMCOS). The Classical Music Awards were distributed on 21 September at the Playhouse Theatre of the Sydney Opera House and are sponsored by APRA and the Australian Music Centre (AMC). The Screen Music Awards were issued on 2 November by APRA and Australian Guild of Screen Composers (AGSC) at the City Recital Hall, Sydney.

== Awards ==
Nominees and winners with results indicated on the right.

=== APRA Music Awards ===
Song of the Year
Title	Artist	Writer	Result
"Can't Shake It"	Kate Miller-Heidke	Kate Miller-Heidke, Keir Nuttall	Nominated
"Dig, Lazarus, Dig!!!"	Nick Cave and the Bad Seeds	Nick Cave	Nominated
"Rattlin Bones"	Kasey Chambers & Shane Nicholson	Kasey Chambers, Shane Nicholson	Nominated
"Walking on a Dream"	Empire of the Sun	Jonathon Sloan, Luke Steele, Nick Littlemore	Nominated
"White Noise"	The Living End	Chris Cheney	Won
Songwriters of the Year
Writer		Artist	Result
Kim Moyes, Julian Hamilton		The Presets	Won
Breakthrough Songwriter Award
Writer		Artist	Result
Geoffrey Gurrumul Yunupingu		Geoffrey Gurrumul Yunupingu	Won
Ted Albert Award For Outstanding Services to Australian Music
Name			Result
~~Denis Handlin~~			revoked
Most Played Australian Work
Title	Artist	Writer	Result
"Don't Hold Back"	The Potbelleez	David Greene, Ilan Kidron, Jonathan Murphy, Sam Littlemore	Nominated
"I Don't Do Surprises"	Axle Whitehead	Robert Conley, Axle Whitehead	Nominated
"Perfect"	Vanessa Amorosi	Vanessa Amorosi, David Franciosa	Nominated
"This Heart Attack"	Faker	Nathan Hudson	Won
"Untouched"	The Veronicas	Jessica Origliasso, Lisa Origliasso, Tobias Gad	Nominated
Most Played Australian Work Overseas
Title	Artist	Writer	Result
"Highway to Hell"	AC/DC	Bon Scott, Angus Young, Malcolm Young	Won
Most Played Foreign Work
Title	Artist	Writer	Result
"All Your Reasons"	Matchbox Twenty	Kyle Cook, Rob Thomas, Paul Doucette, Brian Yale	Won
"Bleeding Love"	Leona Lewis	Jesse McCartney, Ryan Tedder	Nominated
"Dream Catch Me"	Newton Faulkner	Newton Faulkner, Crispin Hunt, Gordon Mills	Nominated
"Pictures of You"	The Last Goodnight	Jeffrey Blue, Kurtis Henneberry, Michael Nadeau	Nominated
"Stop and Stare"	OneRepublic	Andrew Brown, Zachary Filkins, Eddie Fisher, Timothy Myers, Ryan Tedder	Nominated
Blues & Roots Work of the Year
Title	Artist	Writer	Result
"Cowboy Movie"	8 Ball Aitken	8 Ball Aitken	Nominated
"Heal Me"	Lior	Lior Attar, François Tétaz	Nominated
"Stay"	The Waifs	Josh Cunningham, Donna Simpson, Vikki Thorn, Brett Canning	Nominated
"Sun Dirt Water"	The Waifs	Josh Cunningham, Donna Simpson, Vikki Thorn	Nominated
"Sunshine"	Old Man River	Ohad Rein, Edo Kahn, Nadav Kahn	Won
Country Work of the Year
Title	Artist	Writer	Result
"Comin' From" / "Khe Sanh"	Adam Brand	Adam Brand, Sam Hawksley / Don Walker	Nominated
"Good Girls"	Amber Lawrence	Amber Lawrence	Nominated
"I'm Doin' Alright"	Adam Harvey	Adam Harvey, Phillip Buckle	Nominated
"Long Live the Girls"	Sara Storer	Sara Storer, Boh Runga	Nominated
"Rattlin Bones"	Kasey Chambers & Shane Nicholson	Kasey Chambers, Shane Nicholson	Won
Dance Work of the Year
Title	Artist	Writer	Result
"Are You With Me"	The Potbelleez	David Greene, Ilan Kidron, Jonathan Murphy, Sam Littlemore	Nominated
"Don't Hold Back"	The Potbelleez	David Greene, Ilan Kidron, Jonathan Murphy, Sam Littlemore	Won
"Don't You Wanna Feel"	Rogue Traders	Jamie Appleby, Steven Davis, Natalie Bassingthwaighte, Dougal Drummond	Nominated
"Kansas City"	Sneaky Sound System	Angus McDonald, Connie Mitchell	Nominated
"This Boy's in Love"	The Presets	Julian Hamilton, Kim Moyes	Nominated
Jazz Work of the Year
Title	Artist	Writer	Result
"Beyond Both Worlds"	Shannon-Goodrich Ensemble	Elissa Goodrich	Nominated
"Moments and Eternities"	Joe Chindamo	Joe Chindamo	Nominated
"Something Will Come to Light"	Joe Chindamo	Joe Chindamo	Won
"Raindrop"	Paul Grabowsky	Paul Grabowsky	Nominated
"Sailing Day"	Shannon-Goodrich Ensemble	Clare Shannon	Nominated
Urban Work of the Year
Title	Artist	Writer	Result
"City of Dreams"	Joel Turner featuring C4 & KNO	Joel Turner, Shaunn Diamond, Chris Heiner, Kitchener Wesche	Nominated
"In the Basement"	Jade MacRae	Jade MacRae, Arnthor Birgisson	Nominated
"Running Back"	Jessica Mauboy featuring Flo Rida	Jessica Mauboy, Audius Mtawarira, Sean Ray	Won
"The Sea Is Rising"	Bliss n Eso	Max MacKinnon, Jonathan Notley, Noam Dishon	Nominated
"Woodstock 2008"	Bliss N Eso	Max MacKinnon, Jonathan Notley, Noam Dishon	Nominated
=== Classical Music Awards ===
Best Composition by an Australian Composer
Title		Composer	Result
Black Dogs		Iain Grandage	Nominated
jeu fabriqué		Daniel Blinkhorn	Nominated
Monh		Georges Lentz	Won
The Red Tree		Michael Yezerski, Richard Tognetti	Nominated
Best Performance of an Australian Composition
Title	Composer	Performer	Result
Learning to Howl	Andrew Ford	Arcko Symphonic Project	Nominated
String Quartet No. 3	Richard Mills	Jerusalem Quartet	Nominated
Symphony No. 7 Scenes from Daily Life	Carl Vine	West Australian Symphony Orchestra	Won
Instrumental Work of the Year
Title	Composer	Performer	Result
Blue Rags	Ian Munro	Ian Munro	Nominated
Kashmir Remembered	Tony Gould	Tony Gould (piano), David Jones (percussion), Imogen Manins (cello)	Nominated
Rivera Mountain	John Sangster	Tony Gould (piano), David Jones (percussion), Imogen Manins (cello)	Nominated
The River Meets the Sea	Tony Gould, David Jones, Imogen Manins	Tony Gould (piano), David Jones (percussion), Imogen Manins (cello)	Won
Long-Term Contribution to the Advancement of Australian Music
Artist or Organisation			Result
Gwen Bennett			Won
Jon Rose			Nominated
Sydney Symphony's Education Program, Meet the Music Series			Nominated
Orchestral Work of the Year
Title	Composer	Performer	Result
Kalkadungu	Matthew Hindson, William Barton	Sydney Symphony, William Barton (didgeridoo), Richard Gill (conductor)	Nominated
Noumen	Robert Dahm	Melbourne Symphony Orchestra, Reinbert de Leeuw (conductor)	Nominated
Palm Court Suite	Graeme Koehne	Tasmanian Symphony Orchestra, Richard Mills (conductor)	Nominated
Tivoli Dances	Graeme Koehne	Tasmanian Symphony Orchestra, Richard Mills (conductor)	Won
Outstanding Contribution by an Individual
Individual		Work	Result
Riley Lee		2008 World Shakuhachi Festival	Won
Outstanding Contribution by an Organisation
Organisation		Work	Result
Canberra International Music Festival Committee		Canberra International Music Festival 2008	Nominated
MLC School		MLC School (Sydney) Music Department	Nominated
Performing Australian Music Competition Committee		Performing Australian Music Competition (PAMC)	Nominated
Topology		2008 Brisbane Powerhouse Series	Won
Outstanding Contribution to Australian Music in Education
Organisation		Work	Result
Music Viva in Schools		Music Generator Project	Nominated
Sibelius and Ensemble Offspring		Sibelius Composer Awards 2008	Nominated
Southern Cross Soloists		Sunwater and Stanwell Winter Music School	Won
Tasmanian Symphony Orchestra (TSO)		TSO Australian Composers' School	Nominated
Outstanding Contribution to Australian Music in a Regional Area
Organisation		Work	Result
Publications by Wirripang		2008 Activities	Nominated
Southern Cross Soloists		Bangalow Music Festival	Nominated
TaikOz		The Gathering Tour	Nominated
Tura New Music and the Australian Art Orchestra		Crossing Roper Bar Tour	Won
Vocal or Choral Work of the Year
Title		Composer	Result
A Flock of Stars		Lyn Williams	Won
=== Screen Music Awards ===
Best Feature Film Score
Title		Composer	Result
Australia		David Hirschfelder	Nominated
Balibo		Lisa Gerrard	Won
Disgrace		Graeme Koehne, Antony Partos	Nominated
Two Fists, One Heart		David Bridie	Nominated
Best Music for an Advertisement
Title		Composer	Result
Earth Hour Candle "Everybody's Singing This Song"		Elliott Wheeler	Nominated
H & R Block "Paper Man"		Scott Langley	Nominated
Wedgewood "Timeless"		Basil Hogios	Nominated
Optus "Whale Song"		Bruce Heald	Won
Best Music for Children's Television
Title		Composer	Result
Dex Hamilton: Alien Entomologist		Guy Gross	Nominated
Figaro Pho		Michael Darren, Luke Jurevicius	Nominated
Master Raindrop		Russell Thornton	Nominated
The Adventures of Charlotte and Henry		Sean Peter	Won
Best Music for a Documentary
Title		Composer	Result
Contact		Antony Partos	Nominated
Death of the Megabeasts		Ash Gibson Greig	Nominated
Rainforest, the Secret of Life		Yantra de Vilder	Nominated
Sidney Nolan: Mask and Memory		Amanda Brown	Won
Best Music for a Mini-Series or Telemovie
Title		Composer	Result
False Witness		Burkhard Dallwitz	Nominated
Saved		Antony Partos	Nominated
The Informant		Eric Chapus	Nominated
The Last Confession of Alexander Pearce		Roger Mason	Won
Best Music for a Short Film
Title		Composer	Result
Dear Diary		Alan Harding	Nominated
Liebermans in the Sky		Pete E Neville	Nominated
Lucy Wants to Kill Herself		Brett Aplin	Won
The Cat Piano		Benjamin Speed	Nominated
Best Music for a Television Series or Serial
Series or Serial	Episode title	Composer	Result
Bogan Pride	"Episode 6 – The Dance Battle"	Michael Lira	Nominated
McLeod's Daughters	"Episode 224 – The Long Paddock"	Alastair Ford	Won
Rush	"Episode 11"	Stephen Rae	Nominated
Underbelly: A Tale of Two Cities	"Episode 9 – Judas Kiss"	Burkhard Dallwitz	Nominated
Best Original Song Composed for the Screen
Song title	Work	Composer	Result
"Balibo"	Balibo	Ego Lemos	Won
"By the Boab Tree"	Australia	Angela Little, Baz Luhrmann, Felix Meagher, Anton Monsted, Schuyler Weis	Nominated
"Mother's Lament"	Essence of the Game	Jamie Saxe	Nominated
"This Isn't Easy"	Chandon Pictures	Cameron Bruce	Nominated
Best Soundtrack Album
Title		Composer	Result
Australia		various	Nominated
Balibo		various	Nominated
Death Defying Acts		Cezary Skubiszewski	Won
Restraint		Elliott Wheeler	Nominated
Best Television Theme
Title		Composer	Result
Carla Cametti PD		Cezary Skubiszewski, Jan Skubiszewski	Nominated
"Gonna Be on Top" (Australia's Next Top Model)		Travis Conneeley, Martin Eden	Nominated
Satisfaction		Cameron Giles-Webb, Colin Simkins	Won
The Stamp of Australia		Nerida Tyson-Chew	Nominated
International Achievement Award
Artist			Result
Guy Gross			Won
Most Performed Screen Composer – Australia
Composer			Result
Nick Perjanik			Nominated
Jay Stewart			Won
Neil Sutherland			Nominated
Brenton White			Nominated
Most Performed Screen Composer – Overseas
Composer			Result
Alastair Ford			Nominated
Ric Formosa, Danny Beckerman			Nominated
Guy Gross			Nominated
Neil Sutherland			Won

== See also ==
- Music of Australia
