= Girl and the Sea =

EP by The Presets
- Released: 1 November 2004
- Recorded: 2004
- Genre: Electronica
- Length: 4:46
- Label: Modular

The Presets chronology
Blow Up (2003)	Girl and the Sea (2004)	Beams (2005)

Singles from Girl and the Sea
- 1. "Girl and the Sea" Released: 2004 (radio-only)

Girl and the Sea is the second EP by Australian electronic dance music duo The Presets released on Modular Records on 1 November 2004.

The vocals for the song were sung by Julian Hamilton and recorded by The Presets in Kim Moyes' small apartment bathroom. The title track was included on the duo's debut studio album Beams, and was also featured in the TV series The O.C.

== Reception ==
Australian Music Online described the release as being "like a night in October, that perfect combination of hot and cold, light and dark, the nenish tart of EP's"..."Veering from the filthy impending dooms night atmosphere and blippy electronics of "Kitty in the Middle" to the title track "Girl and the Sea"'s wandering bass and pristine, travelling Euro feel, the storming, ecstatic "Summer O' Love" and the gorgeous, heavenly melancholy of "Mia's Mouse".

== Track listing ==
MODEP011
No.	Title	Writer(s)	Length
1.	"Girl and the Sea"	Samuel Dixon, Julian Hamilton, Kim Moyes	4:17
2.	"Kitty in the Middle"	Hamilton, Moyes	2:42
3.	"Summer of Love"	Hamilton, Moyes	5:04
4.	"Mia's Mouse"	Hamilton, Moyes	3:15
5.	"Cutters"	Hamilton, Moyes	3:52
Total length:			19:10

== Charts ==
Chart (2004)	Peak Position
Australian Albums (ARIA)	146

== Release history ==
Region	Date	Label	Format	Catalogue
Australia	1 November 2004	Modular	CD	MODEP011
Australia	1 November 2004	Modular	12" Vinyl	MODVL016
United Kingdom	2005	Modular	CD, 12" Vinyl	MODUK006
