= ITunes Live from Sydney =

iTunes Live from Sydney may refer to:

- iTunes Live from Sydney (The Presets EP), 2008
- iTunes Live from Sydney (Diesel EP), 2009
- iTunes Live from Sydney (Wolfmother EP), 2010
