= Hi Viz (album) =

Studio album by The Presets
- Released: 1 June 2018
- Genre: Electronic
- Length: 52:24
- Label: EMI
- Producer: The Presets

The Presets chronology
Pacifica (2012)	Hi Viz (2018)

Singles from Hi Viz
- 1. "Do What You Want"; 2. "14U+14Me" Released: 9 Feb 2018; 3. "Downtown Shutdown" Released: 11 May 2018; 4. "Martini" Released: 10 August 2018; 5. "Are You Here?" Released: 18 November 2018

Hi Viz (typeset as HI VIZ) is the fourth studio album by Australian electronic duo The Presets. The album was released in Australia by Modular Recordings on 1 June 2018.

Upon release, the band said "We're always trying to do something different, at least within what we feel is The Presets. We were really just trying to get back to fun. The whole message of the record is inclusiveness, and it's a party, with an open invitation."

In April 2018, The Presets announced a national tour commencing in June 2018.

At the ARIA Music Awards of 2018, the album was nominated for Best Cover Art.

== Critical reception ==
Professional ratings
Review scores
Source	Rating
The AU Review	4/5 stars
The Music	4.5/5 stars

Sosefina Fuamoli from The AU Review gave the album 4 out of 5, writing: "If you've been a long time fan of The Presets, Hi Viz won't be treading unfamiliar territory, though it's exciting to comprehend what this album will mean for new fans, or those music listeners who may have just been casual listeners before." Fuamoli also called the album "a defining point for The Presets; they've made their return in a climate flushed with young producers climbing their way to the top but make no mistake, they've dropped a great "How To Do It Right" record with this". MJ O'Neill from The Music Au gave the album 4.5 out of 5 saying, "The tripping half-step beats, jazz scales and random bursts of 8-bit noise on opener "Knuckles" are probably the weirdest thing The Presets have ever done." adding "Hi Viz drops all pretences and simply detonates the dancefloor. It's bloody brilliant. Creative? Expressive? Surprisingly contemporary, even? Yep. All those things. But, above all, it's just awesome."

Andrew Drever from The Sydney Morning Herald opined that "The Presets have never made an album like Hi Viz – full throttle from go to whoa. It's their best, and strangest album. Many of the tracks seem constructed like club music, with Hamilton's voice (often processed, like a phone call down a bad line) left to find its place or dutifully serve the sleek, electronic set pieces as another instrument." Triple J called the album "a colourful blend of "rave nuggets, cyber croons and pub techno" for what they're referring to as their 'party album'." Cyclone Wehner from Music Feeds said: "Hi Viz is contemporary party music that pays homage to the past, and anticipates a brighter future, while shedding the pretension." aaa Backstage said: "Hi Viz is The Presets' incongruous, opus piece. Throughout the album, the duo's club textures stretch and spasm to strange dynamics. Artificial and dispersed in ungainly bursts, it is garish and gorgeous all at once." Stack magazine stated: "Hi Viz is the soundtrack to a crazy night out, where you wake up the following day, discombobulated, wondering, "What have I done? Where have I been?" All you know for sure is you had fun."

== Track listing ==
No.	Title	Writer(s)	Length
1.	"Knuckles"	Julian Hamilton; Kim Moyes	3:29
2.	"Do What You Want"	Hamilton; Moyes	3:01
3.	"Martini"	Hamilton; Moyes	4:00
4.	"Beethoven"	Hamilton; Moyes	4:12
5.	"Downtown Shutdown"	Hamilton; Moyes	5:16
6.	"Out of Your Mind" (featuring Alison Wonderland)	Warren "Oak" Felder; Hamilton; Moyes; Taylor Parks	3:04
7.	"Tools Down" (featuring uncredited vocals by Jake Shears)	Hamilton; Moyes; Fritz Helder; Jason Sellards	4:33
8.	"Feel Alone"	Hamilton; Moyes	5:41
9.	"Brains"	Hamilton; Moyes	1:57
10.	"Are You Here?" (featuring DMA's)	Hamilton; Moyes; Matt Mason; Tommy O'Dell; Johnny Took	5:23
11.	"14U+14Me"	Hamilton; Moyes	4:54
12.	"Until the Dark"	Mike Callander; Hamilton; Moyes	6:58
Total length:			52:24

== Charts ==
Chart (2018)	Peak position
Australian Albums (ARIA)	5
New Zealand Heatseeker Albums (RMNZ)	8

== Release history ==
Region	Date	Label	Format	Catalogue
Australia	1 June 2018	Modular, EMI Music	CD, vinyl, digital download	6735010
