= Beams (The Presets album) =

Studio album by The Presets
- Released: 12 September 2005
- Genre: Dance
- Length: 43:18
- Label: Modular

The Presets chronology
Girl and the Sea (2004)	Beams (2005)	Apocalypso (2008)

Singles from Beams
- 1. "Are You the One?" Released: 24 October 2005; 2. "Down Down Down" Released: 8 May 2006 (UK); 3. "Steamworks" Released: 2006 (promo); 4. "I Go Hard, I Go Home" Released: 6 November 2006 (US)

Beams is the debut studio album by Australian electronic dance music duo The Presets, released on 12 September 2005 by record label Modular. The album reached No. 55 on the Australian Charts, and was certified gold in Australia.

The album cover was inspired by the one used for Fleetwood Mac's Rumors (1977) album.

== Background ==
The track, 'Steamworks', is named after a gay bathhouse in the San Francisco Bay Area. The track is still one of the duo's favourite songs. Julian Hamilton said "The song is just 'oo's and 'ah's, but it has a strong character -- that's hard to do."

The album includes a few instrumental interludes which Kim Moyes says "I think those little interludes [on Beams] are so cool," however interlude would only feature on this album due to the band wanting to be "as vocal and up-for-it as possible" when making their second album, Apocalypso (2008).

In a retrospective interview with the band, Moyes says "I re-listened recently when we had to approve all the masters for its vinyl reissue,"..."And it's fucking awesome!" he recalled, "In the early days of Modular, there was always talk of, 'Which producer do you want to work with?',"..."But we only wanted to do whatever weird thing we do, warts and all. For better or worse, we don't really sound like anyone else." "That's the best thing about Beams," Hamilton agrees. "It sounds like The Presets."

== Reception ==
Professional ratings
Review scores
Source	Rating
AllMusic	4/5 stars
Pitchfork	3.7/10
PopMatters	7/10
Rolling Stone	3.5/5 stars

The album received mixed to positive reviews. AllMusic called the album an "uneasy yet unforgettable combination of '80s gaudy pop flair and dark, propulsive rave beats". Pitchfork, on the other hand, gave it a low 3.7/10 rating, writing "the most frustrating thing about Beams is that Moyes and Hamilton both know better".

The Guardian gave a three star review and observed, "The Australian duo begin by apeing Michael Jackson's Billie Jean, with singer Julian Hamilton out-grunting Jacko, and conclude with the title track, which features a synthesized banjo. In between, introspective synth-pop shares space with gothic disco and a gnarly rave monster, Hamilton apparently tapping out the beats on his larynx as he sings," concluding, "There is much to enjoy here, but Beams sags under the weight of too many ideas. Perhaps next time we'll get to see behind their masks."

== Track listing ==
All tracks are written by Julian Hamilton and Kim Moyes, unless otherwise noted.

No.	Title	Writer(s)	Length
1.	"Steamworks"		4:36
2.	"Are You the One?"		3:24
3.	"Down Down Down"		3:17
4.	"Girl and the Sea"	Samuel Dixon, Hamilton, Moyes	4:46
5.	"Black Background"		1:39
6.	"Worms"		4:00
7.	"Kitty in the Middle"		2:42
8.	"Hill Stuck"		1:47
9.	"Girl (You Chew My Mind Up)"		3:52
10.	"I Go Hard, I Go Home"		5:04
11.	"Bad Up Your Betterness"	Hamilton, Daniel Johns, Moyes	4:11
12.	"Beams"	Hamilton, Daniel Johns, Moyes	3:42

Beams – iTunes release
No.	Title	Length
13.	"Kitty in the Middle (Kitty Said)"	5:43
14.	"I Go Hard, I Go Home" (DJ Hell Remix)	9:11

Beams – 2 × 12" 45 RPM Vinyl release Side A
No.	Title	Length
1.	"I Go Hard, I Go Home"	5:04
2.	"Kitty in the Middle" (Trombone – Phil Stucky)	2:42

Side B
No.	Title	Length
1.	"Are You the One?"	3:24
2.	"Down Down Down"	3:17

Side C
No.	Title	Writer(s)	Length
1.	"Girl and the Sea" (Bass, Guitar – Samuel Dixon, Vocals – Kendal Cuneo)	Samuel Dixon, Hamilton, Moyes	4:46
2.	"Black Background"		1:39

Side D
No.	Title	Writer(s)	Length
1.	"Steamworks"		4:36
2.	"Bad Up Your Betterness"	Hamilton, Daniel Johns, Moyes	4:11

== Personnel ==
The Presets

- Julian Hamilton – vocals, keyboards, mixing
- Kim Moyes – drums, keyboards, mixing

Additional musicians

- Felix Bloxsom – drums (tracks 1, 2, 4, 11)
- Phil Stucky – Trombone (tracks 2, 8, 12)
- Sam Dixon – bass and guitar (track 4)
- Kendal Cuneo – girl vocals (track 4)
- Veronique Serret – violin (track 12)
- Matthew Watson – violin (track 12)
- Zoe White – viola (track 12)
- Leah Zweck – viola (track 12)
- Rachael Maio – cello (track 12)
- Daniel Johns – acoustic guitar (track 12)
- Warwick Payne – guitar (track 12)

Technical

- ¥ Benjamin ~ DePriest
- Scott Horscroft – mixing
- Emerson Todd – mixing
- Mike Marsh – mastering
- Lyn Balzer – photography
- Anthony Perkins – photography
- Jonathan Zawada – art direction

== Charts ==
Chart performance for Beams
Chart (2005–2008)	Peak position
Australian Albums (ARIA)	55

== Certifications ==
Region	Certification	Certified units/sales
Australia (ARIA)	Gold	35,000^{^}
^{^} Shipments figures based on certification alone.

== Release history ==
Region	Date	Label	Format	Catalogue
Australia	12 September 2005	Modular	CD, digital download	MODCD034
Australia	2006	Modular	2×CD, digital download	MODCD034 (with Resets)
North America	April 2006	Modular	2×CD, digital download	MODCD039
Europe	2006	Island Records	CD, LP	2600039
Australia	April 2019	Modular Recordings	LP	6788640
