= Yippiyo-Ay =

Single by The Presets

from the album Apocalypso
- Released: 2008
- Recorded: 2007
- Genre: Dance-punk; electroclash
- Length: 4:34
- Label: Modular

The Presets singles chronology
"Talk Like That" (2008)	"Yippiyo-Ay" (2008)	"If I Know You" (2009)

"Yippiyo-Ay" is a single by The Presets and the fourth taken from their second studio album Apocalypso. "Yippiyo-Ay" debuted on the Australian ARIA Singles Chart on 24 November 2008 at number 95 and later peaked at 72. No music video was made for the song. It was featured on the Australian version of the Ministry of Sound Clubbers Guide to 2009 three-disc set. The Presets have indicated that the song is essentially about handjobs.

This song was used during the Seven Network's coverage of the 2009 Australian Open, and on one episode of The World's Strictest Parents. The PSP version of the video game Gran Turismo included an instrumental version of the song.

== Track listings ==
All tracks are written by The Presets.

No.	Title	Length
1.	"Yippiyo-Ay"	4:34

== Charts ==
Chart (2008–09)	Peak position
Australia (ARIA)	72
Australian Dance Singles (ARIA)	12
Australian Artist Singles (ARIA)	14
Australian Airplay Chart (AMR)	53
Australian Independent Singles (AIR)	4

== Certifications ==
Region	Certification	Certified units/sales
Australia (ARIA)	Gold	35,000^{‡}
^{‡} Sales+streaming figures based on certification alone.

== Release history ==
Region	Date	Label	Format
Australia	2008	Modular	Airplay
