= Talk Like That =

2008 single by the Presets

Single by the Presets

from the album Apocalypso
- Released: 27 September 2008
- Recorded: 2007
- Genre: Dance-punk; electroclash
- Length: 3:44
- Songwriters: Julian Hamilton, Kim Moyes

The Presets singles chronology
"This Boy's in Love" (2008)	"Talk Like That" (2008)	"Yippiyo-Ay" (2008)

"Talk Like That" is a song by Australian electronic music duo the Presets, released as the third from their second studio album, Apocalypso (2008). The song was written by duo members Julian Hamilton and Kim Moyes and released in September 2008. Moyes has described the track as "a calypso house track with these weird cathedral organs, techno tom toms and a ballsy bassline."

Upon the song's release, the song debuted at number 49 on the Australian Singles Chart and peaked at number 19 in November 2008. The music video for "Talk Like That" was shot by French directorial duo Jonas & François.

== Track listing ==
1. "Talk Like That" (original) – 3:44
2. "Talk Like That" (Dave Spoon Televised remix) – 7:44
3. "Talk Like That" (Jence remix) – 5:30
4. "Talk Like That" (music video) – 3:42

== Charts ==
=== Weekly charts ===
Chart (2008)	Peak position
Australia (ARIA)	19
Australian Artist Singles (ARIA)	3
Australian Club Chart (ARIA)	5
Australian Independent Singles (AIR)	1

=== Year-end chart ===
Chart (2008)	Position
Australia (ARIA)	80

== Certifications ==
Region	Certification	Certified units/sales
Australia (ARIA)	2× Platinum	140,000^{‡}
^{‡} Sales+streaming figures based on certification alone.

== Media usage ==
- This song was used on the Seven Network show The World's Strictest Parents.
- This song was used in the 2009 Rock Eisteddfod Challenge.
