= Apocalypso (The Presets album) =

Studio album by The Presets
- Released: 12 April 2008
- Recorded: 2007
- Genre: Dance
- Length: 50:57
- Label: Modular
- Producer: The Presets

The Presets chronology
Beams (2005)	Apocalypso (2008)	iTunes Live from Sydney (2008)

Singles from Apocalypso
- 1. "My People" Released: 7 December 2007; 2. "This Boy's in Love" Released: April 2008; 3. "Talk Like That" Released: 27 September 2008; 4. "Yippiyo-Ay" Released: 24 November 2008; 5. "If I Know You" Released: 23 March 2009; 6. "Kicking and Screaming" Released: May 2009 (promo)

Apocalypso is the second studio album by Australian electronic dance music duo The Presets. The album was released by record label Modular on 12 April 2008 in Australia, on 13 May in the United States, and 2 June in the United Kingdom. The album features the singles "My People", "This Boy's in Love", "Talk Like That", "Yippiyo-Ay", "If I Know You" and "Kicking and Screaming".

At the J Awards of 2008, the album won Australian Album of the Year.

== Production ==
After two years of non-stop touring, The Presets began production of Apocalypso in early 2007 by going to a farm in Byron Bay for two weeks. The duo had no songs written or any idea what the album would sound like before hitting the farm. Basing themselves in Berlin, the band continued work on the album while touring in Europe. The majority of the album was recorded by the band themselves at their own individual home studios. The songs were finished at a friend's studio and the album was mixed at BJB Studios in Sydney and at Seedy Underbelly in Los Angeles. The album was mastered at The Exchange in London.

Kim Moyes, describing the album, said "There is a few songs on Apocalypso that have been informed by our live shows in terms of their energy, after two-and-a-bit years of touring we really found out what we liked playing and what works well live, but the album as a whole however is not all bangers, there are some very delicate moments too." The group also wanted Apocalypso to be far more song-focused. Moyes told Rolling Stone Australia: "With [previous album] Beams, we didn't think too much about it. The more fucked up it was, the better. But now the vision’s been refined and instead of instrumentals, now we're like 'fuck, let’s just have killer songs.'"

In an interview with Australian national radio station Triple J, the band members discussed how they came up with the album's title, stating that it evolved from "Apocalypse Wow", a suggestion by Hamilton. "Y'know the idea of the apocalypse and a calypso together. Something very dark, very intense, you can't get much worse than an apocalypse. And then a calypso which is just super fun, like mojitos, steel drums."

== Reception ==
Professional ratings
Review scores
Source	Rating
AllMusic	3/5 stars
The Guardian	4/5 stars
Pitchfork	5.8/10

Apocalypso was the album that brought the Presets to mainstream audiences. The album debuted at number one on the ARIA charts, and achieved gold certification within two weeks. The album has since gone platinum. In October 2008, the album won the 2008 ARIA Awards for Best Dance Release and Album of the Year. By winning the ARIA for Album of the Year, Apocalypso became the first dance album to win the award. It also won the Artisan Awards for Best Cover Art (Jonathan Zawada) and Producer of the Year (The Presets), missing out on the award for Engineer of the Year (Scott Horscroft). It was also nominated for the Highest Selling Album in 2009. In December, the album won the J Award. In October 2010, it was listed in the book 100 Best Australian Albums. Betty Clarke of The Guardian awarded the album four stars out of five, noting that "the Presets have taken a giant leap forward". Clarke observed 1980s influences including Yazoo, Blancmange, OMD, and Prince (on "Yippiyo-Ay").

== Track listing ==
No.	Title	Length
1.	"Kicking & Screaming"	5:45
2.	"My People"	4:31
3.	"A New Sky"	4:36
4.	"This Boy's in Love"	4:12
5.	"Yippiyo-Ay"	4:34
6.	"Talk Like That"	3:44
7.	"Eucalyptus"	3:29
8.	"If I Know You"	4:28
9.	"Together"	5:53
10.	"Aeons"	3:28
11.	"Anywhere"	6:17

Apocalypso – UK bonus track
No.	Title	Length
12.	"Buzz Factory"	5:22
Total length:		56:19

Apocalypso – iTunes deluxe version
No.	Title	Length
12.	"Buzz Factory"	5:19
13.	"My People" (Mouse on Mars Terror Pretz Bounce Remix)	3:47

Apocalypso – Japan bonus tracks
No.	Title	Length
12.	"My People" (DIM Remix)
13.	"This Boy's in Love" (Lifelike Remix)
14.	"Talk Like That" (Jence Happy House Remix)

Apocalypso – collector's edition bonus disc
No.	Title	Length
1.	"My People" (D.I.M. Remix)	6:36
2.	"This Boy's in Love" (Lifelike Remix)	6:51
3.	"Talk Like That" (Jence Remix)	5:30
4.	"Are You the One?" (Lifelike Remix)	6:09
5.	"Anywhere" (Still Going! Remix)	7:42
6.	"My People" (Mouse on Mars Acid Pretzels Mix)	5:55
7.	"Talk Like That" (An Optimo |Espacio| Remix)	7:22
8.	"Anywhere" (Compuphonic and Kolombo Remix)	7:13
9.	"This Boy's in Love" (Jori Hulkkonen Remix)	10:00
Total length:		63:05

Apocalypso – tour edition bonus disc
No.	Title	Length
1.	"This Boy's in Love" (Zombie Nation Remix)	8:07
2.	"Kicking & Screaming" (Bang Gang's E Is for Edit)	6:55
3.	"If I Know You" (Tom Middleton Remix)	5:34
4.	"This Boy's in Love" (Kevin Saunderson Remix)	6:46
5.	"Talk Like That" (Dave Spoon Televized Mix)	7:45
6.	"My People" (Mouse on Mars Terror Pretzels Remix)	3:46
7.	"If I Know You" (Heartbreak Remix)	6:46
8.	"I Go Hard I Go Home" (DJ Hell Remix)	9:08
9.	"Talk Like That" (CFCF Remix)	5:42
10.	"If I Know You" (Tania & Jori Version)	4:56
Total length:		65:18

== Charts ==
=== Weekly charts ===
Chart (2008)	Peak position
Australian Albums (ARIA)	1

=== Year-end charts ===
Chart (2008)	Position
Australian Albums (ARIA)	5
Chart (2009)	Position
Australian Albums (ARIA)	48

== Certifications ==
Region	Certification	Certified units/sales
Australia (ARIA)	3× Platinum	210,000^{^}
^{^} Shipments figures based on certification alone.

== Personnel ==
- Julian Hamilton – vocals, keyboards
- Kim Moyes – drums, keyboards
- Scott Horscroft – mixing
- John Fields – mixing
- Nilesh Patel – mastering
- Lyn Balzer – photography
- Anthony Perkins – photography
- Jonathan Zawada – art direction

== Release history ==
Region	Date	Label	Format	Catalogue
Australia	April 2008	Modular	CD, digital download	MODCD084
United States	May 2008	Modular	CD, digital download	MODCD067
Europe	June 2008	Modular	CD, LP, digital download	MODCD088
Australia	2009	Modular	2×CD, digital download	MODCD108
Australia	April 2019	Modular	2×LP, digital download	6788641
