= This Boy's in Love =

Single by The Presets

from the album Apocalypso
- Released: April 2008
- Genre: Electropop; synthpop; electro house
- Length: 4:11
- Label: Modular
- Songwriter(s): Julian Hamilton, Kim Moyes
- Producer(s): The Presets

The Presets singles chronology
"My People" (2007)	"This Boy's in Love" (2008)	"Talk Like That" (2008)

"This Boy's in Love" is a song by Australian electronic duo The Presets. It is the second single from their 2008 album Apocalypso.

== Music video ==
The music video for "This Boy's in Love" was directed by Danish photographer Casper Balslev. The video filming took over two days. It depicts the band singing and playing in dust and dirty air, and two semi-naked fighters wrestling in milk.

== Track listings ==
=== CD single ===
1. "This Boy's in Love"
2. "This Boy's in Love" (Lifelike Remix)
3. "This Boy's in Love" (Jori Hulkkonen Remix)

=== iTunes EP ===
1. "This Boy's in Love"
2. "This Boy's in Love" (Zombie Nation Remix)
3. "This Boy's in Love" (K.I.M Edit)
4. "Are You the One?" (Lifelike's 1 Serious Remix)

=== iTunes EP ===
1. "This Boy's in Love"
2. "This Boy's in Love" (Lifelike Remix)
3. "This Boy's in Love" (Jori Hulkkonen Remix)

=== 12" vinyl ===
1. "This Boy's in Love"
2. "This Boy's in Love" (K.I.M. Edit)
3. "This Boy's in Love" (Lifelike Remix)

=== 12" vinyl ===
1. "This Boy's in Love" (Jori Hulkkonen Remix)
2. "This Boy's in Love" (Zombie Nation Remix)
3. "This Boy's in Love" (Kevin Saunderson Remix)

=== 7" vinyl ===
1. "This Boy's in Love"
2. "Buzz Factory"

== Charts ==
=== Weekly charts ===
Chart (2008)	Peak position
Australia (ARIA)	23
UK Physical Singles Chart (OCC)	47
UK Dance Singles Chart (OCC)	4
US Dance Club Songs (Billboard)	25

=== Year-end charts ===
Chart (2008)	Position
Australia (ARIA)	67

== Certifications ==
Region	Certification	Certified units/sales
Australia (ARIA)	2× Platinum	140,000^{‡}
^{‡} Sales+streaming figures based on certification alone.
