= Australian Music Online =

Australian music website

- Website type: Australian music index
- Available in: English
- Owner: Reamont Pty Ltd
- Creator: Reamont Pty Ltd
- Website: Offline
- Commercial: No
- Launched: March 2003
- Current status: Inactive, archived

Australian Music Online is a website that indexes information related to Australian music. Launched in March 2003 as an Australian Federal Government initiative, and originally proposed in 1998, the website was updated until 31 March 2007, at which point its role transferred to that of an archive. It has been noted that there are plans to restructure the website. As of late 2009 the website is still offline.

Australian Music Online has an Alexa traffic rating of 430,350, with a rank of 19,854 for Australian internet users.

On 10 March 2005, MusicAustralia, a National Library of Australia project, was announced, rendering much of Australian Music Online redundant.

There has been some controversy around the allocation of public funding to this project as there was no competitive tender process. This culminated in the publication of a crikey.com article in 2007.
