= The Presets =

Australian electronic music duo

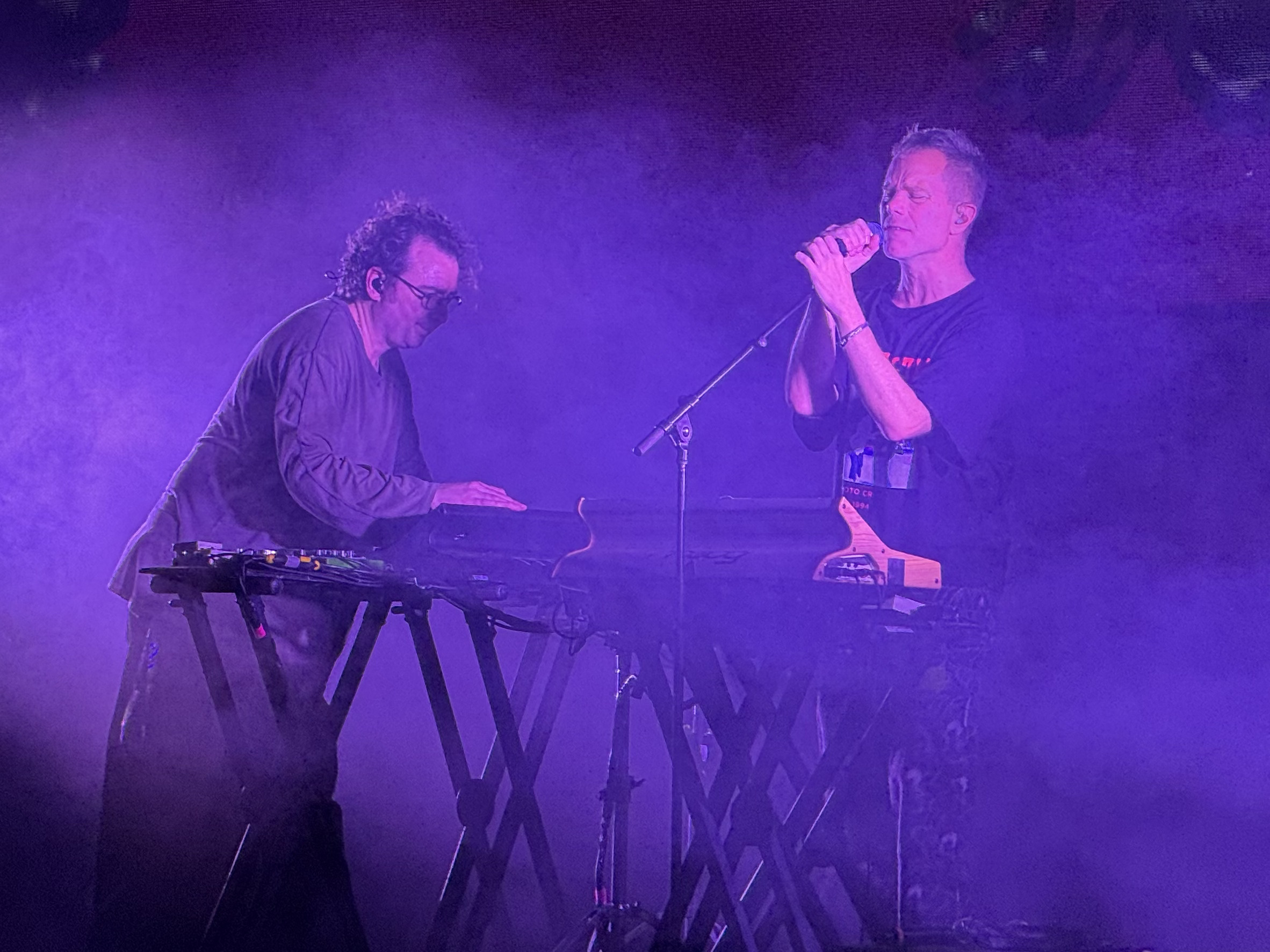
- The Presets performing at AO Live in 2026

Background information
- Origin: Sydney, New South Wales, Australia
- Genres: Electropop; electro house; dance-punk; electroclash; synthpop; dance
- Years active: 2003–present
- Labels: Modular; EMI
- Spinoff of: Prop
- Members: Julian Hamilton; Kim Moyes
- Website: thepresets.com

The Presets are an Australian electronic music duo of Julian Hamilton (vocals, keyboards) and Kim Moyes (drums, keyboards). Formed in 2003 and signed to Modular Records, The Presets released two EPs (Blow Up, Girl and the Sea) in advance of their debut album, Beams, released in 2005 to positive critical response. After two years of touring, including as the Australian support for Daft Punk, the band's 2008 release, Apocalypso, debuted at number one on the ARIA Albums Chart, and went on to win six awards at ARIA Awards 2008, including Album of the Year.

In 2009, Hamilton and Moyes won an APRA Award for Songwriters of the Year and another ARIA Award, this time for Best Dance Release for "Talk Like That". They released their third album, Pacifica, in Australia in September 2012. It reached No. 3 on the ARIA Albums Chart. Their fourth album, Hi Viz, was released in June 2018. The Presets are known for their dynamic live shows.

Aside from the Presets' extensive performance work, the duo has remixed tracks for several other artists including Kings of Leon, Silverchair and Lenny Kravitz. The Presets are recognised as key players in the dance music explosion in Australia in the late 2000s.

== History ==
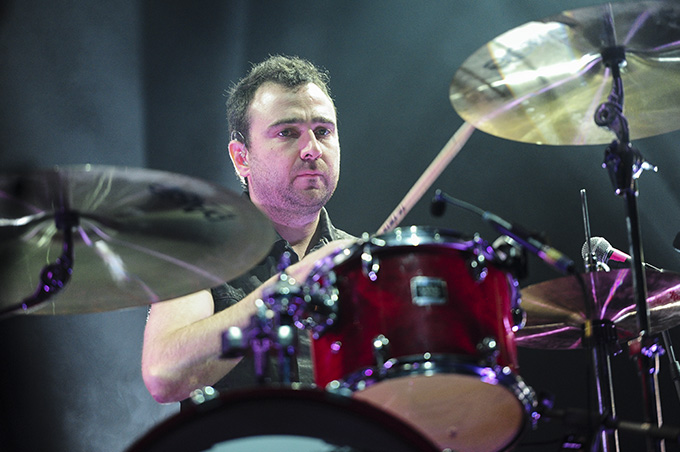
Kim Moyes

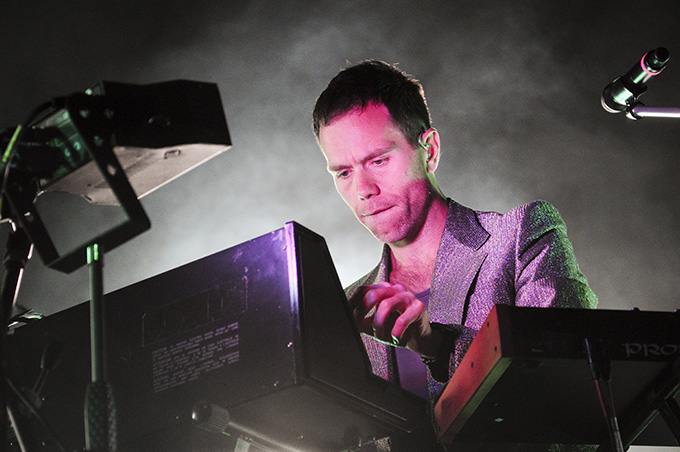
Julian Hamilton

The Presets' founders, Julian Hamilton and Kim Moyes met in 1995 at the Sydney Conservatorium of Music where they were both studying classical music. They shared an interest in 1980s pop music and became members of the Sydney-based electronic group, Prop, with Jeremy Barnett on marimbas, Hamilton on keyboards, Moyes on vibraphone, David Symes on bass guitar and Jared Underwood on drums. This group released two albums, Small Craft, Rough Sea in 2001 and Cook Cut Damage Destroy in 2003. Hamilton and Moyes broke off from Prop when they remixed a track, "Magnetic Highway", with "harder electronic edges" under the name The Presets.

=== 2003–2004: Early EPs ===
The Presets formed in Sydney in 2003 with Hamilton on vocals, keyboards and production and Moyes on drums, keyboards, production and programming. The band recorded a demo which drew the attention of Modular Records. They signed with the label and released a seven-track extended play, Blow Up, in November. Daniel Johns (Silverchair) provided guitar work and co-wrote the track, "Cookie" with the duo. The EP was favourably compared to work by Depeche Mode, Soft Cell and Cabaret Voltaire. The Presets supported the EP with gigs in Sydney, Melbourne and Brisbane; and issued a 10" single, "Beat On / Beat Off", on Rex Records. In November 2004, as a follow-up, a second EP was issued, the five-track Girl and the Sea. Its title track was eventually featured on The O.C. – the United States teen drama TV series in March 2006. Tim Colman of The Sydney Morning Herald described them as having "successfully fused pop, techno, electro and rock. They've even stripped the live rig down to drums, keyboards, microphones and an iPod." In the same month the duo ventured out on their first interstate shows, performing as part of a Modular Records night which also featured Cut Copy, Colder, and BRAINS (The Avalanches in DJ Mode).

=== 2005–2006: Beams ===
The Presets released their debut album, Beams in Australia on 12 September 2005. The first commercially released single from the album was "Are You the One?", backed with non-album tracks "Truth and Lies" and "Midnight Boundary", as well a remix of "Girl and the Sea" by Cut Copy. The UK version of the single (which appeared in early 2006) featured remixes by Simian Mobile Disco and Van She. A remix of the song by French DJ, Lifelike, was commissioned in 2008 to feature in a BMW 1 Series commercial in Australia. The Presets played their first shows in the United Kingdom and Europe, opening as special guests for fellow Australian band The Dissociatives as well as two shows of their own in London.

Throughout the second half of 2005, the duo toured Australia nationally several times, playing shows with Little Birdy, Paul Mac and Regurgitator, and their own headline tour in October. 2005 also saw the band make their first Australian festival appearances, DJing at Splendour in the Grass, Byron Bay and Come Together Festival in Sydney, as well as closing off the year playing at Falls Festival in Lorne, Australia.

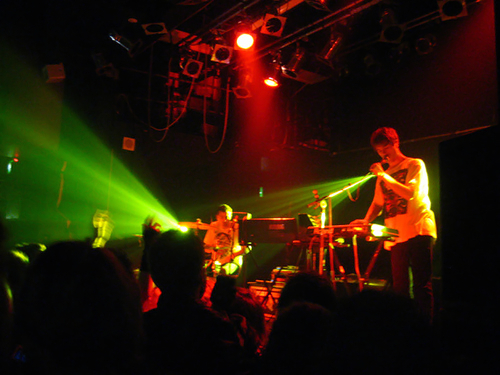
The Presets performing live in London, 2006.

The Presets kicked off 2006 with their first-ever national Australian festival run, playing in the Boiler Room for the Big Day Out. The first half 2006 saw The Presets begin to promote their music more heavily in the UK, Europe and the US. They opened for Australian band Wolfmother on several UK dates in February 2006. They then travelled over to the US in March to play their first New York shows before a handful of showcases at SXSW, Austin, Texas and on to Miami for Winter Music Conference. It was in New York that DJ Hell saw the band play and subsequently licensed Beams to his label International Deejay Gigolo Records for a European release mid-2006. The duo returned to the UK and Ireland as special guest of Soulwax on several dates, before heading back over to the US to open for Ladytron on an extensive national tour. "Down Down Down" received an official release in the UK with remixes by Digitalism, Bumblebeez and Midnight Juggernauts (the song has previously been a promo only single in Australia in 2005).

The next single released for the band was "I Go Hard, I Go Home", again released in the UK only with remixes by DJ Hell, The Juan Maclean and Ascii Disko. As many of the mixes of "Are You the One?", "Down Down Down" and "I Go Hard, I Go Home" had not been readily available in the US, Modular Records released Resets, a bonus disc available only with Beams in limited quantities. It was subsequently released physically and digitally in Australia at the end of the year.

The band returned to Australia mid-year for Infinity 2006, presented by Modular Records featuring The Presets and special guests Digitalism. The tour sold out everywhere and was met with ecstatic reviews. The tour was followed by a triumphant set at Splendour in the Grass, with PopMatters describing the audience's reaction: "It's been a long time since I've seen a crowd go as wild as this."

The touring schedule continued with a run of club dates across the US summer, including playing Folsom Street Fair in San Francisco, then hopping over to Europe for more club dates. The latter half of the year saw the band tour extensively with The Rapture in the UK and the US, including an appearance in New York at Webster Hall as part of CMJ Music Marathon.

=== 2007–2008: Apocalypso ===
A major turning point for The Presets was their 2007 Big Day Out Shows. Playing the penultimate slot in the Boiler Room saw the band play to their biggest audiences to date. inthemix described their set as "Pure class! The Presets well and truly earned their promotion up the timetable from last years early afternoon scorcher. The Aussie duo have only improved from a further 12 months of relentless touring and performed with the charisma of seasoned pros." March saw a quick visit to North America with a handful of club dates and appearances at SXSW Music Festival and Miami Winter Music Festival.

In April 2007, the Presets released another single only distributed in the UK, "Truth & Lies", which featured two songs and originally appeared as a B-side to "Are You The One?" in Australia. Around the same time the band spent a few weeks at a farm just outside Bryon Bay, where they began work on what would become their second album. In the middle of the year the band relocated to Berlin for several months. During this time they played across Europe on the festival circuit, including Benicàssim in Spain and Global Gathering in the UK. On the way home they performed at Modular Stage at Summer Sonic in Japan. Back in Sydney they continued to work in earnest on the album. By November the bulk of the album was completed.

In December, The Presets performed as the main support act for Daft Punk during their NeverEverLand tour around Australia. The tour proved highly successful with almost 35,000 people attending the Sydney show alone. Coinciding with the NeverEverLand Tour, The Presets released "My People", the lead single from their second album Apocalypso. Paired with a groundbreaking video by Kris Moyes and several remixes, the song was added instantly to the Triple j network, and saw commercial radio networks in Australia give the band their first airplay. Overseas, "My People" kickstarted a renewed interest in the band, becoming The Guardian's Pick of the Week, who likened the song to "the brutality of Aussie rules football [...] in a good way, obviously."

Apocalypso was issued on 12 April 2008, which debuted at number-one on the ARIA Albums Chart and remained in the top 50 for 63 weeks. It achieved the iTunes number-one spot for several weeks. By 2009 it was certified triple platinum (shipment of 210,000 units) in Australia. The Guardian described the album as "a giant leap forward [...] Julian Hamilton and Kim Moyes have sharpened their pop-poisoned claws and dug them deep into their dark-hued techno." The publication drew comparisons to Yazoo, Blancmange and OMD.

Throughout 2008 the band performed at several festivals throughout Europe and the US including 5 Days Off in The Netherlands, Creamfields in the UK, Electric Picnic in Ireland, Exit Festival in Serbia, Famufest in the Czech Republic, Festival Pantiero in France, Get Loaded in the UK, Glastonbury in the UK, Detour Festival in the US, Folsom Street Fair in the US, Les Ardentes in Belgium, Lovebox Weekender in the UK, Monolith Festival in the US, Øyafestivalen in Norway, T in the Park in the UK and V Festival in the UK.

In May 2008, the Presets released "This Boy's in Love", with the song of the same name still being played on the radio before its release. In October, the band won six ARIA Awards at the 2008 ceremony: Producer of the Year, Best Artwork (artwork by Jonathan Zawada), Best Video ("My People", directed by Kris Moyes), Best Dance Release, Best Group and Album of the Year. They became the first electronic music group to receive the award for Album of the Year. In December, Apocalypso was awarded the J Award for Australian Album of the Year. The Presets appeared in Triple J's Hottest 100 for 2008 three times, with "Yippiyo-Ay" at number 56, "This Boy's in Love" at number 8, and "Talk Like That" at number 6.

=== 2009–2011 ===
The Presets played at the festival Good Vibrations Festival, which made its way around Australia in February 2009. In the following month, The Presets performed for Sound Relief at the Sydney Cricket Ground. Sound Relief, which took place on 14 March 2009 was a benefit concert for victims of the Victorian bushfire crisis and the Queensland floods. The concert welcomed 80,000 punters into the Sydney Cricket Ground. The AU Review described the Presets' performance as "the moment that will define Sound Relief". The Presets "tore through favourites such as "My People", "Yippiyo-ay" and "This Boy's in Love" providing a moment of pure euphoria". Their performance was enhanced by the thunderstorm overhead showering down over the 80,000 person crowd.

In April, the Presets performed at Coachella Valley Music and Arts Festival and in May the duo embarked on their national tour of Australia. Along with their support act Architecture in Helsinki, the band performed for around 70,000 people across Australia. At the 2009 APRA Awards in June, Kim Moyes and Julian Hamilton won Songwriter of the Year, "Talk Like That" won the 2009 ARIA Award for Best Dance Release and "If I Know You" won the UK Music Video Award for Best Dance Video (directed by Eva Husson.) On New Years Day 2010, the Presets played at the Sydney dance music festival, Field Day, and on 3 January the duo headlined the Summadayze Festival in Perth.

In May, the Presets released a remix of Sarah Blasko's song "Hold on My Heart". The band also remixed "Closer", the opening track for Kings of Leon's fourth album Only by the Night. The Presets' remix of the song "Closer" went on to feature as a bonus track on Kings of Leon's fifth album Come Around Sundown, which was released in October 2010.

In February 2011, the Presets headlined the MS Festival at Inveresk (Launceston) and in March they performed at Future Music Festival, which took place in five separate sights around Australia. They also played at Coachella Valley Music and Arts Festival in April for the second time since 2009. During the same month, the Presets performed as one of the headlining acts at Festival Estereo Picnic in Bogota, Colombia.

The Presets have publicly expressed dismay that journalists often rely on the band's Wikipedia page for research purposes. Hamilton stated in a Rolling Stone Australia interview: "We always get the same six questions. We should put on our Wiki page 'we [really] hate it when journalists check this page to ask us questions.'"

=== 2012: Pacifica ===
In June 2012 the band released the single "Youth in Trouble" and in August 2012 "Ghosts" in advance of their album Pacifica. "Ghosts" featured on the official soundtrack of EA Sports' FIFA 13.

Pacifica was released on 7 September 2012. The album received domestic and international acclaim. Pacifica was the ARIA Charts Album of the Week following its release in September 2012. ARIA described the album's stand out tracks: "'Fall'-- Julian Hamilton's vocals at their haunting best, 'Fast Seconds' will be mind-blowing live and 'Promises' a summer anthem with New Order flavours."

Australian publications The Sydney Morning Herald, The Australian, and the Herald Sun also labelled Pacifica Album of the Week. In an article review on Pacifica, the Sydney Morning Herald stated "it's fair to say that on Pacifica, Moyes and Hamilton have stepped up and out, unafraid and keen to test their boundaries."

Pacifica was nominated for the 2012 J Award for Australian Album of the Year. Triple J described Pacifica as "an album that constantly surprises- while still proving the Presets know how to rip up a dance floor."

In October 2012, the Presets performed at the CMJ Music Marathon in New York. The CMJ Music Marathon is a music event, which spans over 5 days in 80 different nightclubs across New York City. The Presets performed at the same festival 6 years prior in 2006. They performed at the Treasure Island Music Festival in San Francisco in the same month and headlined the dance festival Parklife, which took place in five cities across Australia in September and October. The Presets were featured in the Hottest 100 of 2012 twice. The single "Promises" was voted in at number 70 while "Ghosts" appeared at number 52. The Presets won Best Live Act in the inthemix Awards for 2012 and the single "Ghosts" was awarded Single of the Year (readers vote) in the Rolling Stone Australia Awards.

=== 2013–present ===
In celebration of Australia Day 2013, the Presets performed at the Australia Day Live Concert on the lawns of Parliament House on 25 January. In February, the band embarked on their national tour of Australia to promote Pacifica.

In March the duo played at the Snowball Festival in Colorado, as well as the Sasquatch Music Festival at The Gorge Amphitheatre in Washington in May. The Presets also performed at Dark Mofo in Hobart, SXSW Music Festival in the US, Splendour in the Grass in Byron Bay, Australia, and they headlined the Mardi Gras Festival in Sydney, Australia.

The Presets were nominated for Best Live Act in the inthemix Awards for 2013 and in the Triple J Hottest 100 of the last 20 years "My People" was voted in at number 77. The countdown, hosted by radio station Triple J, had 940,000 voters from Australia and around the world. The countdown was a means of narrowing down the top songs released between 1993 and 2012. The Presets were one of 29 Australian artists, which were recognised in the countdown.

Two days before Bali Nine ringleaders Andrew Chan and Myuran Sukumaran were executed in Indonesia for drug trafficking, Kim Moyes condemned the death penalty via Facebook and called for their fans to "stop listening to [our] music" if they supported the then-impending executions of the Bali Nine pair. He went on to reiterate that their 2007 single "My People" was inspired by the plight of asylum seekers during the John Howard era. The duo later apologised for "getting personal" and posted a tribute after Chan and Sukumaran were executed along with six other prisoners on 29 April 2015.

In October 2023, The Presets featured on 3%'s debut single "Our People", which samples "My People".

== Members ==
- Julian Hamilton – vocals, keyboards
- Kim Moyes – drums, keyboards

== Discography ==
- Beams (2005)
- Apocalypso (2008)
- Pacifica (2012)
- Hi Viz (2018)

== Awards and nominations ==
=== ARIA Awards ===
The Australian Recording Industry Association Music Awards (commonly known as ARIA Music Awards or ARIA Awards) is an annual series of awards nights celebrating the Australian music industry, presented by the Australian Recording Industry Association (ARIA). The Presets have received seventeen nominations between 2006 and 2018, of which they have won seven.

Year	Nominee / work	Award	Result
2006	Beams	Best Dance Release	Nominated
2006	"Are You the One?"	Best Video (Directed by Kris Moyes)	Nominated
2008	Apocalypso	Album of the Year	Won
2008	Apocalypso	Best Dance Release	Won
2008	Apocalypso	Best Group	Won
2008	Apocalypso	Producer of the Year (Julian Hamilton, Kim Moyes)	Won
2008	Apocalypso	Best Cover Art (Jonathan Zawada)	Won
2008	"My People"	Best Video (directed by Kris Moyes)	Won
2008	"My People"	Single of the Year	Nominated
2008	Apocalypso	Engineer of the Year (Scott Horscroft)	Nominated
2009	"Talk Like That"	Best Dance Release	Won
2009	Apocalypso	Highest Selling Album	Nominated
2013	Pacifica	Best Dance Release	Nominated
2014	"No Fun"	Best Dance Release	Nominated
2014	The National Tour	Best Australian Live Act	Nominated
2018	"Do What You Want"	Best Video (directed by Kris Moyes)	Nominated
2018	Hi Viz	Best Cover Art (Jonathan Zawada)	Nominated

=== APRA Awards ===
The APRA Music Awards are several award ceremonies run in Australia by Australasian Performing Right Association to recognise songwriting skills, sales and airplay performance by its members annually. Songwriter of the Year is voted by APRA's Board of Writer and Publisher Directors rewarding the songwriter who has recorded the most impressive body of work in the previous year.

Year	Nominee / work	Award	Result	Ref.
2009	Kim Moyes and Julian Hamilton	Songwriters of the Year	Won	
2009	"This Boy's in Love" (Julian Hamilton and Kim Moyes)	Dance Work of the Year	Nominated	
2010	"If I Know You" (Julian Hamilton and Kim Moyes)	Dance Work of the Year	Nominated	
2010	"Talk Like That" (Julian Hamilton and Kim Moyes)	Dance Work of the Year	Nominated	
2013	"Youth in Trouble" (Julian Hamilton and Kim Moyes)	Song of the Year	Shortlisted	
2014	"Promises" (Julian Hamilton and Kim Moyes)	Dance Work of the Year	Nominated	

=== The Australian Music Prize ===
The Australian Music Prize (The AMP) is an annual award of $30,000 given to an Australian band or solo artist in recognition of the merit of an album released during the year of award.

Year	Nominee / work	Award	Result
2008	Apocalypso	Australian Album of the Year	Nominated
2013	Pacifica	Australian Album of the Year	Nominated
2018	Hi Viz	Australian Album of the Year	Nominated

=== J Awards ===
The J Award is an award given by Australian youth radio station Triple J to Australian Album of the Year.

Year	Nominee / work	Award	Result
2008	Apocalypso	Australian Album of the Year	Won
2008	"My People"	Australian Music Video of the Year	Nominated
2012	Pacifica	Australian Album of the Year	Nominated
2023	"Our People" (with 3%)	Australian Video of the Year	Nominated

=== Helpmann Awards ===
The Helpmann Awards is an awards show, celebrating live entertainment and performing arts in Australia, presented by industry group Live Performance Australia since 2001. Note: 2020 and 2021 were cancelled due to the COVID-19 pandemic.

Year	Nominee / work	Award	Result	Ref.
2014	Australian Chamber Orchestra featuring The Presets	Best Australian Contemporary Concert	Nominated	

=== FBi SMAC Awards ===
The FBi SMAC Awards are public-voted awards recognising contributors to Sydney's creative culture, including in music, theatre, visual art, film, or food.

Year	Nominee / work	Award	Result
2008	Apocalypso	Record of the Year	Won
2019	"Martini"	Song of the Year	Nominated

=== National Live Music Awards ===
The National Live Music Awards (NLMAs) are a broad recognition of Australia's diverse live industry, celebrating the success of the Australian live scene. The awards commenced in 2016.

Year	Nominee / work	Award	Result
2018	The Presets	Live Electronic Act (or DJ) of the Year	Nominated

=== Rolling Stone Australia Awards ===
The Rolling Stone Australia Awards are awarded annually in January or February by the Australian edition of Rolling Stone magazine for outstanding contributions to popular culture in the previous year.

Year	Nominee / work	Award	Result
2012	"Ghosts"	Single of the Year (Readers' Vote)	Won

=== UK Music Video Awards ===
The UK Music Video Awards is an annual celebration of creativity, technical excellence and innovation in music video and moving image for music.

Year	Nominee / work	Award	Result
2009	"If I Know You"	Best Dance Music Video	Won

=== In the Mix Awards ===
Year	Nominee / work	Award	Result
2006	"Are You the One?"	Best Video (Kris Moyes)	Won
2012	The Presets	Best Live Act	Won
2013	The Presets	Best Live Act	Nominated

=== Faster Louder Festival Awards ===
Year	Nominee / work	Award	Result
2008	The Presets	Best Local Festival Act	Won

=== GQ Australia Men of the Year Awards ===
Year	Nominee / work	Award	Result
2008	The Presets	Band of the Year	Won
