= Kim Moyes =

Australian musician

Kimberley Isaac Moyes is an Australian musician, producer, mix engineer, composer, songwriter, DJ and one half of the Sydney-based electronica duo, the Presets. Moyes provides synthesizers and drums, as well as engineering, production and songwriting. The Presets have released two EPs and four full-length albums (Beams, Apocalypso, Pacifica and Hi Viz). Moyes also records and performs as a solo artist under the alias K.I.M. In 2018, Moyes launched his own vinyl and digital record label called Here to Hell.

== Early life and education ==
Born on 15 September 1976 in Sydney, New South Wales, Moyes attended the Conservatorium High School for his final school years 11 and 12, before going on to a Bachelor of Music at the Sydney Conservatorium of Music (majoring in classical percussion).

== Career ==
During his studies at university, Moyes formed the instrumental band, Prop. They released one full-length album, a remix compilation and limited edition Japanese-only 7". Prop enjoyed a cult following and toured as main support for '90s heavyweight bands such as Sonic Youth, Stereolab and Tortoise. They were invited to curate a performance at the Sydney Opera House entitled "Prop & Friends".

As a member of the Presets, Moyes enjoyed considerable success: 12 ARIA nominations (of which they have won 7), APRA's Songwriters of the Year 2012, as well as other awards for Best Live Band, Band of the Year and Album of the Year.

Outside of the Presets, Moyes has released many recordings of his own. Through Cutters Records he released "System Breakdown" in 2005, followed by the 12-inch single "B.T.T.T.T.R.Y" through Bang Gang in 2006. In 2007 and 2008, he released a consecutive series of 12-inch records through Modular Recordings: "Wet'N'Wild", "Party Machini" and "Fistogram". Many of these tracks are featured on Selected Jerks 2001–2009, a double-disc album of original recordings and remixes throughout 8 years. Selected Jerks was preceded by a Japanese-only mini-album, System Breakdown, released in 2006 via Rallye Records.

Throughout his time in the Presets, Moyes remixed for many artists, both as the Presets and under his K.I.M. or (KIM) moniker, including acts such as Kings of Leon, Sarah Blasko and Architecture in Helsinki. He has also worked extensively as a session musician and as a producer. His production credits include albums for Shady Nasty, Kirin J Callinan, Jack Ladder and DMA's.

== Awards and nominations ==
=== Melbourne WebFest ===
- 2022 Best Original Score - Phenomena

=== APRA Award ===
- 2009 Songwriters of the Year (shared with Julian Hamilton)

== Discography ==
=== Albums ===
==== Live albums ====
List of albums
Title	Details
Live In The Tank	Released: 28 Nov 2023 (AUS); Label: Here to Hell (HTHLP004); Format: DD

==== Score albums ====
List of albums
Title	Details
Phenomena	Released: 12 May 2021 (AUS); Label: Here to Hell (HTHLP003); Format: DD

==== Compilation albums ====
List of compilation albums
Title	Details
Selected Jerks 2001–2009	Released: 30 October 2009 (AUS); Label: Modular (MODCD117); Format: CD, DD

==== Mini-albums ====
List of mini-albums
Title	Details
System Breakdown	Released: 14 October 2006 (Japan only); Label: Rallye / Klee (KLCD007); Format: CD

==== EPs ====
List of extended plays
Title	Details
Kloser	Released: 8 August 2014 (AUS); Label: Motorik! (MTK015); Format: DD

=== Singles ===
List of singles
Title	Year	Album
"System Breakdown"	2005	System Breakdown
"B.T.T.T.T.R.Y."	2006	System Breakdown
"Wet 'n Wiild"	2007	System Breakdown
"Fist O Gram"	2008	Selected Jerks 2001–2009
"Party Machini"	2008	Selected Jerks 2001–2009
"Shake Your Brains"	2019	Non-album singles
"Ghost Town" (featuring Connie Mitchell)	2021	Non-album singles

=== Remixes ===
List of remixes, showing year released and original artists
Title	Year	Original artist(s)
"Flamingo" (KIM Remix)	2007	Tomboy
"Rock Number One" (K I M Remix)	2007	Cassius
"This Boy's in Love" (K.I.M Edit)	2008	The Presets
"Music More Than a Passion, a Drug" (KIM Remix)	2009	Dinamics
"Turbo Love" (K.I.M. Remix)	2009	Bag Raiders
"What You Need" (KIM Remix)	2010	Tiga
"Someone Out There..." (KIM Remix)	2010	AKA JK
"Fields" (KIM Remix)	2010	Via Tania
"Vital Signs" (KIM Remix)	2010	Midnight Juggernauts
"Body Heat" (KIM Remix)	2011	Toni Toni Lee
"Run" (KIM Presets Club Remix)	2011	Charge Group
"The Edge" (Kim Remix)	2012	Yuksek
"Techno Music 2013" (KIM Remix)	2013	Australia
"Midnight Man" (K.I.M Remix)	2017	Flash and the Pan
"Boredom" (K.I.M Remix)	2018	The Drones
"I'm Hot" (K.I.M Remix)	2018	Ajax
"Trust in Me" (K.I.M Remix)	2020	Rinse
"The Island" (K.I.M Remix)	2021	The Lazy Eyes
"Devotion" (K.I.M Remix)	2022	Horror My Friend
"Rasta" (K.I.M Remix)	2022	Kinder (feat. Gold Fang)
"Motorcycle" (K.I.M Remix)	2022	Lady Jane Beach
"Alice Magic" (K.I.M Remix)	2025	Jacqui Hunt

== Production, mixing, writing and musician credits ==
- Silvas - MOG IN THE CITY (2026) [co-writer/additional production/mixer/mastering]
- Sex Mask - EP [producer/mixer/mastering]
- Genesis Owusu - Human Again (2026) [co-writer]
- Genesis Owusu - Life Keeps Going (2026) [co-writer]
- Shady Nasty - TREK (2025) [producer/mixer/engineer]
- Shady Nasty - SCREWDRIVA (2025) [producer/mixer/engineer]
- Shady Nasty - CAREDBRAH (2024) [producer/mixer/engineer]
- Itch-E & Scratch-E - Itch-E Kitch-E Koo [30th Anniversary Remastered] [vocal production/mastering pre-production]
- Véronique Serret - Migrating Bird (2024) [producer/mixer]
- Mazy - So Excited (2024) [mixer]
- Véronique Serret - Topsy Turvy World (2024) [producer/mixer]
- Sachi - My Tempo (2024) [co-writer]
- Véronique Serret & William Barton - Carbon Footprint (2024) [producer/mixer]
- Jack Ladder - Tall Pop Syndrome (2023) [co-producer/mixer]
- Shady Nasty - G-SHOCK (2023) [producer/mixer]
- Aleesha Dibbs - Comin For Me Now (2023) [mixer]
- Jack Ladder - Game Over (2023) [co-producer/mixer]
- Jack Ladder - Home Alone (2023) [co-producer/mixer]
- Aleesha Dibbs - Conjured You Up (2023) [mixer]
- Aleesha Dibbs - Battalion (2023) [mixer]
- Lady Jane Beach - Motorcycle (2022) [co-producer]
- Aleesha Dibbs - Battalion (2022) [mixer]
- Shady Nasty - CHEST HEIGHT (2022) [producer/mixer]
- Kinder - Rasta (feat. Gold Fang) (2022) [co-writer/co-producer/programming]
- Keli Holiday - KELI (2022) [co-writer/producer]
- Mazy - Interstella (2022) [mixer]
- Keli Holiday - Off My Mind (2022) [co-writer/producer]
- The Presets - You Belong (2022) [co-producer/co-writer/mixer]
- The Presets - NYE 2021 Midnight Fireworks Soundtrack (2022) [co-producer/co-writer/mixer]
- Art vs. Science - Sweat (2021) [producer/mixer]
- Lady Jane Beach - Outback (2021) [co-producer]
- Moody Beach - Assembly Of The Wild EP (2021) [producer/mixer/drums/synths/co-writer]
- Keli Holiday - December (2021) [producer]
- Mazy - Flowers (2021) [mixer]
- Moody Beach - Plastic Love (2021) [producer/mixer/drums/synths]
- Keli Holiday - Song Goes On (2021) [producer]
- Holy Holy - Aftergone (feat. CLEWS) (2021) [co-producer/co-writer]
- DZ Deathrays - Kerosene (2021) [co-writer]
- Moody Beach - The Other (2021) [producer/mixer/drums]
- Keli Holiday - Where You Feel (2021) [producer]
- Mazy - You Got Me (2021) [mixer]
- Moody Beach - Why Not (2021) [producer/mixer/drums/synths]
- Perfect Moment - Perfect Moment EP (2020) [producer/co-writer]
- Northeast Party House - Shelf Life Album (2019) [co-producer]
- DZ Deathrays - Still No Change (2019) [co-writer]
- Kult Kyss - Rituals (2019) [co-producer]
- The Presets & Golden Features - RAKA EP (2019) [co-producer/co-writer]
- Slum Sociable - Afterthought (2018) [co-writer]
- Golden Features - Falling Out (2018) [co-producer/co-writer]
- The Presets - Hi Viz (2018) [co-producer/co-writer]
- Zero Percent - Volumes (2018) [co-producer/co-writer]
- DMA's - For Now (2018) [producer/co-writer]
- Jack Ladder and The Dreamlanders "Playmates" (2014) [producer/co-writer]
- Beni – Protect/I Can't Hide EP (2014) [writer/producer]
- Beni – Love on the Run/Summer's Gone EP (2013) [writer/producer]
- Kirin J Callinan – Embracism (2013) [producer/co-writer]
- Forces – Overland (In My Mind) (2012) [mixing]
- The Presets - Pacifica (2012) [co-producer/co-writer]
- Beni – House of Beni (2011) [co-producer/co-writer]
- Beni – Maximus (2009) [producer]
- The Presets – Apocalypso (2008) [co-producer/co-writer]
- Digitalism – Pogo (2007) [co-writer]
- Lost Valentinos – Miles from Nowhere EP (2007) [producer tracks A1/A2]
- Riot in Belgium – La Musique (2007) [co-writer/mixing/additional production]
- PNAU – No More Violence (2007) [co-writer]
- Riot in Belgium – The Acid Never Lies (2006) [co-writer, mixing and additional production]
- Love Tattoo – Tuff Love (2005) [producer/writer]
- The Presets – Beams (2005) [co-producer/co-writer]
- The Valentinos/Lost Valentinos – The Valentinos EP (2005) [producer]
- Natalie Imbruglia - Satisfied (2005) [drums/glockenspiel]
- Decoder Ring – Somersault (OST) (2004) [vibraphone]
- Siena – Sway (2004) [producer/co-writer]
- The Presets – Girl and the Sea EP (2004) [co-producer]
- The Dissociatives - The Dissociatives (2004) [additional production/drums/vibraphone/percussion]
- PNAU – Lovers (2003) [co-writer]
- The Presets – Blow Up EP (2003) [co-producer]
- Coda – There Is a Way to Fly (2003) [vibraphone/percussion/writer]
- Prop – Small Craft, Rough Sea (2001) [co-producer/co-writer/vibraphone/percussion]
- Powderfinger – The Metre (2001) [marimba]

== Touring ==
- 'Selected Jerks 2001–2009' National Launch Tour (October–November 2009)
- National Winter DJ Tour (June–July 2013)

== Other appearances ==
- A Bag Raiders Remix of "B.T.T.T.T.R.Y." was featured in the video game Grand Theft Auto IV.
