= Julian Hamilton =

Australian musician

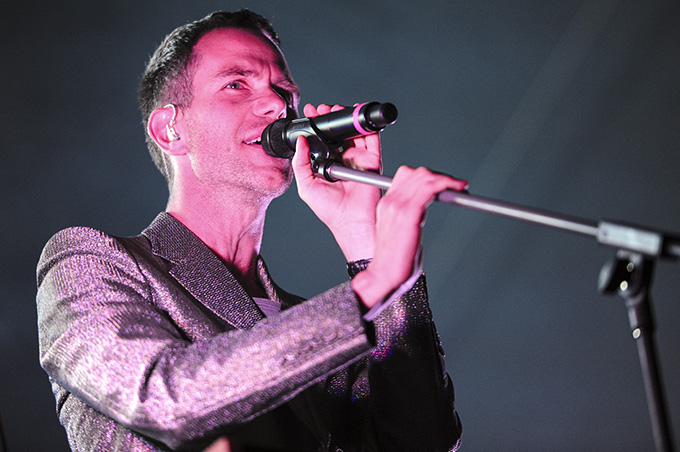
- Hamilton of The Presets, Parklife Festival, Wellington Square, Perth in October 2012

Background information
- Born: Julian Thomas Hamilton; September 1976 (age 50); Sydney, New South Wales, Australia
- Genre: Electro
- Occupation: Musician
- Instruments: Vocals, keyboards
- Years active: 2001–present

Julian Thomas Hamilton (born September 1976) is an Australian singer-songwriter and keyboardist, who, with bandmate Kim Moyes, formed the electronica duo, The Presets in 2003. They have issued four studio albums, Beams (September 2005), Apocalypso (April 2008), Pacifica (September 2012), and Hi Viz (June 2018). Both were previously members of another electronic group, Prop, which released two albums, Small Craft Rough Sea (2001) and Cook Cut Damage Destroy (early 2003). Hamilton has also worked as a session and touring member of Silverchair (2001–2003) and The Dissociatives (2004). At the APRA Music Awards of 2008 Hamilton and Daniel Johns (of Silverchair) won Song of the Year and Most Played Australian Work for Silverchair's single, "Straight Lines". In 2009 Hamilton and Moyes won Songwriters of the Year for their work on Apocalypso for The Presets.

== Biography ==
Hamilton was born in September 1976 and grew up in Sydney. He attended St Andrew's Cathedral School, where he sang in the associated Cathedral Choir. He completed his Higher School Certificate in 1994.

In the following year, Hamilton was studying piano at the Sydney Conservatorium of Music, where he met Kim Moyes (studying classical percussion). Hamilton on keyboards and Moyes on vibraphone joined an electronic band Prop, with Jeremy Barnett on marimbas, David Symes on bass guitar and Jared Underwood on drums. Prop released their debut album, Small Craft Rough Sea, in 2001 on Undercover Music/Silent Recordings label. In October that year, Radio National's Brent Clough aired some of their tracks on his programme, Otherworlds, and described their sound as "fusing jazz, classical, minimalist, funk and techno elements into a seamless whole" and noted their "remarkably diverse influences – with selections from Olivier Messiaen and Philip Glass to Sci-Fi soundtracks, Squarepusher and Al Green".

Small Craft Rough Sea's tracks were remixed by various artists and appeared as Cook Cut Damage Destroy, in early 2003. The remix artists included Stereolab, Pnau, paulmac, Decoder Ring, Mice Parade, Telemetry Orchestra, Mako, Pivot and Burnt Friedman. Chris Johnston of The Age reviewed the remix album in March 2010, and felt its sound was "cerebral and faintly ridiculous jazz-fusion" which resulted in an album "where in wordless, warbly ... songs such as 'Low' they attempted to abridge the history of Western thought and Eastern composition into one mid-length instrumental".

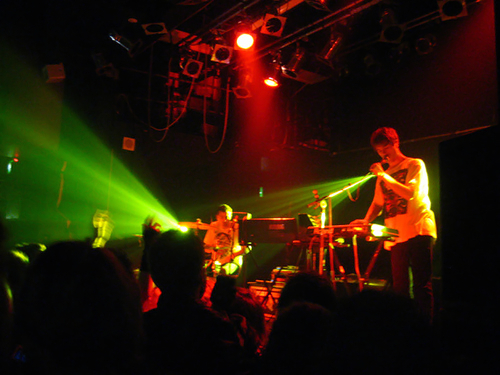
Hamilton (right) and Kim Moyes (centre) of The Presets. Performing in London, United Kingdom, October 2006.

Hamilton and Moyes formed The Presets in 2003, to provide their own remix of one of Prop's track, "Magnetic Highway", as "Blood Bubbles" for Cook Cut Damage Destroy. Tammy La Gorce of AllMusic noted their version showed "harder electronic edges". Moyes later recalled "Julian and I used to muck around after Prop rehearsals and play the stupidest music we could... This new style that we were experimenting with, we got computers eventually and started recording them and put a little demo together".

As a member of The Presets, Hamilton has provided lead vocals, songwriting, keyboards, mixing, and producing for their releases including three studio albums, Beams (September 2005), Apocalypso (April 2008), and Pacifica (September 2012). Hamilton has worked as a session and touring musician, and co-songwriter, for Silverchair (2001–2003); and, with Moyes, as touring and session musicians for The Dissociatives (2004). Hamilton worked with The Sleepy Jackson to record their 2006 album, Personality - One Was a Spider, One Was a Bird. He is credited for orchestral arrangements and additional production, and also played keyboard and synth on many of the songs. Hamilton co-wrote four tracks with Daniel Johns on the 2007 Silverchair album, Young Modern, including the singles "Straight Lines" and "Mind Reader". Hamilton also co-wrote the song "On My Own" for Bluejuice's 2011 album Company.

In 2013 he released the Single "Higher Love" taken from the Vocal Collaboration Album "Features" by Kris Menace.

=== Personal life ===
In the early 2000s, Julian Hamilton met Janice Petersen at a record store where they both worked. They became a domestic couple and live in Sydney, where Petersen, since 2008, is the co-anchor of the Special Broadcasting Service (SBS) TV evening news. Hamilton and Petersen have two children.

== Awards and nominations ==
=== APRA Award ===
- 2008 Song of the Year and Most Played Australian Work for "Straight Lines" – wins shared with Daniel Johns.
- 2009 Songwriters of the Year – win shared with Kim Moyes.
