= Modular Recordings =

Australian record label

- Parent company: Universal Music Australia
- Founded: 1998; 28 years ago
- Founder: Steve Pavlovic
- Distributors: Universal Music Australia; Interscope Records (US); Island/Polydor Records (UK)
- Genre: Rock; electronica; electropop; neo-psychedelia; psychedelic rock
- Country of origin: Australia
- Location: Sydney

Modular Recordings (known simply as Modular) is an Australian record label founded in 1998 by Steve Pavlovic that by 2015 was owned by Universal Music Australia. It has released music from local artists such as Eskimo Joe, Ben Lee, The Avalanches, Wolfmother, Cut Copy, The Bumblebeez, Bag Raiders, Van She, Rocket Science, Ghostwood, The Presets, Pond, and Tame Impala, and local releases of international artists including Dom, Yeah Yeah Yeahs, Chromeo, Colder, Klaxons, Ladyhawke, NYPC, MSTRKRFT, and Softlightes.

After its establishment, the label was first recognised by the successful releases of The Living End's eponymous debut album and Ben Lee's Breathing Tornados, with the former becoming the highest-selling rock debut, and the latter being nominated for the ARIA Award for Album of the Year. It then grew during the early 2000s, defining itself through its assortment of parties, artists, and the "electronic, rock-leaning dance music" that became known as the "Modular sound". However, in 2015, a lawsuit filed by BMG Rights Management pitted the label against UMA, with UMA originally winning in July against owner Pavlovic, but the courts overturned the decision in October towards Pavlovic's favor. Thereafter, Pavlovic resigned in March 2016, leaving the label under renovations.

== History ==
Modular Recordings was founded in 1998 by Steve Pavlovic, first recognised with The Living End's eponymous debut album and Ben Lee's Breathing Tornados. Both were successful, The Living End became the second highest-selling debut rock album in Australian music history at the time; Breathing Tornados was nominated for the "Album of the Year" ARIA Award. The Avalanches's Since I Left You (2000) was also another critical success, earning the group nine ARIA Award nominations.

In 2004, with the emergence of Cut Copy, The Presets and The Bumblebeez and the development of regular Modular parties and tours, the label began to grow, defining its 'electronic, rock-leaning dance music' the "Modular sound". Dan Whitford of Cut Copy described it as 'discovering dance music played live with a more musical aesthetic, rather than just a DJ on stage'. In 2004, an office was established in New York, followed by London in 2005. Van She, a new wave electropop four piece from Sydney were signed in August 2005, as well as NYPC in mid-2006. An office in Los Angeles opened in 2007, along with the signing of Ghostwood, Plug-In City and The Whitest Boy Alive.

In June 2015, Modular and Universal Music Australia were sued by BMG Rights Management for failing to honour an agreement made over $1 million worth in royalties from Tame Impala recordings, including Innerspeaker and Lonerism and the group's self-titled EP. Frontman Kevin Parker himself claimed in a Reddit AMA (Ask Me Anything) that 'Someone high up spent the money', and that he 'may never get that money'. UMA claimed that on 24 December 2014 Pavlovic agreed to sign a separation deal, giving half of Modular to UMA, together with music, trademarks, websites and other assets, but refused to and claimed the deal wasn't binding and is owed $32,500 in holiday pay. UMA initially won the lawsuit against Pavlovic in June at the New South Wales Court of Appeal, but the court overturned the decision in favor of Pavlovic in October, stating that Pavlovic did comply and recognised the deal, which was technically non-official since it wasn't signed. However, he resigned from Modular on 11 March and most of the roster of musicians have since been signed within Universal label group.

== Artists ==
- Architecture in Helsinki
- The Avalanches
- Azari & III
- Bag Raiders
- Beni
- Ceo
- Cut Copy
- Grace Woodroofe
- Jonathan Boulet
- Kindness
- Ladyhawke
- Movement
- NYPC
- Pond
- The Presets
- The Rapture
- Rocket Science
- Sneaky Sound System
- Tame Impala
- The Tough Alliance
- Van She
- Wolfmother

== Compilations ==
- Modular Presents: Leave Them All Behind (2005)
- Modular Presents: Leave Them All Behind 2 (2007)
- Modular Presents: Leave Them All Behind 3 (2009)

== See also ==
- List of record labels
