= Cut Copy discography =

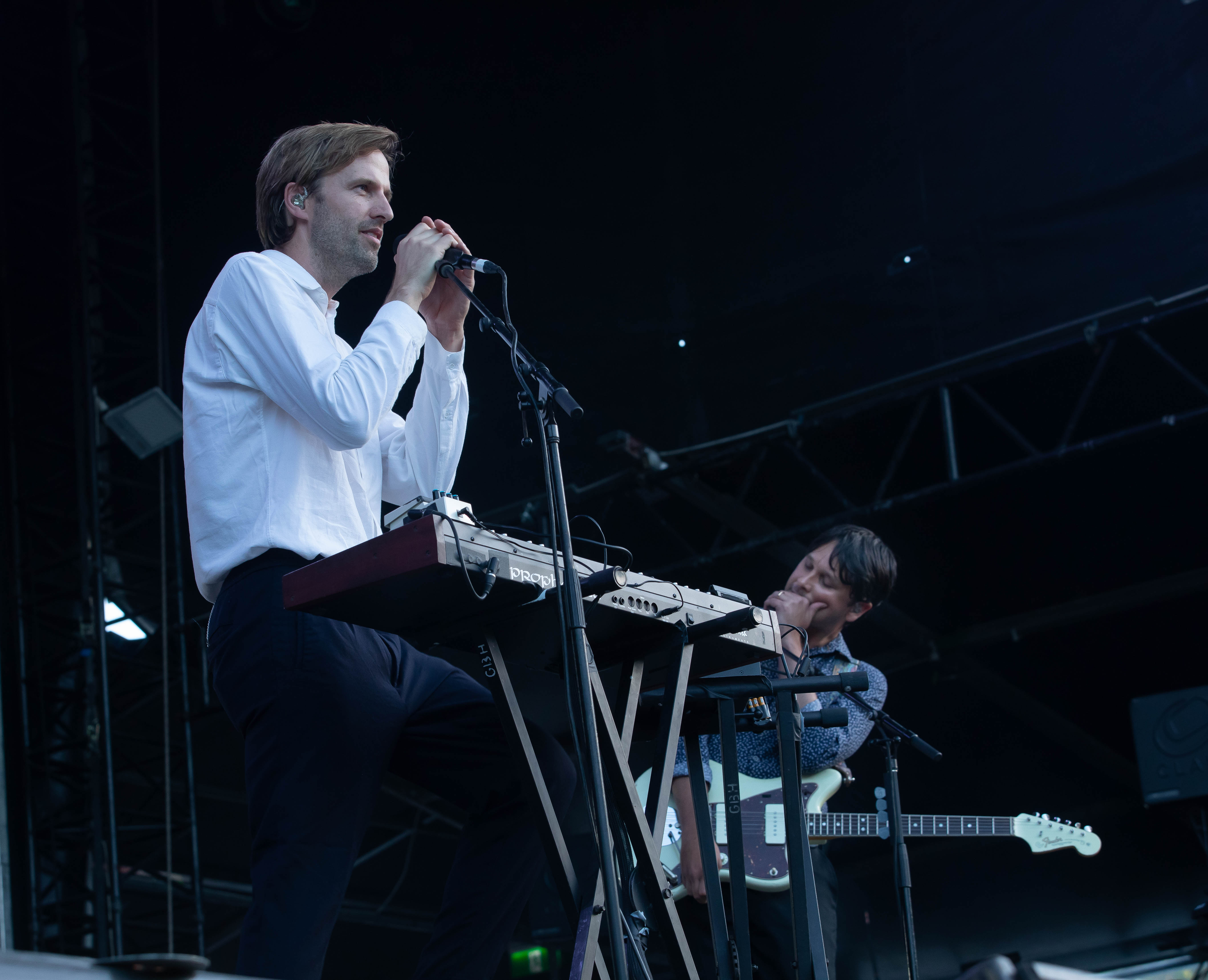
- Cut Copy performing at Falls Festival in Byron Bay, 2018
- Studio albums: 7
- EPs: 5
- Singles: 28
- Music videos: 14
- DJ mix albums: 4
- Promotional singles: 4

Australian electronic music band Cut Copy have released seven studio albums, four mix albums, five extended plays, twenty-eight singles, four promotional singles and fourteen music videos.

Cut Copy debuted with the EP I Thought of Numbers in September 2001. Their debut studio album, Bright Like Neon Love, was released in April 2004, but failed to chart. The band achieved biggest commercial and critical success with their second studio album, In Ghost Colours, released in March 2008, which reached number one in their home country and gathered positive reviews. The album spawned the band's two highest-charting singles in Australia, "Lights & Music" and "Hearts on Fire".

The group's third studio album, Zonoscope, was released in February 2011, reaching number three in Australia and attaining modest success internationally. Free Your Mind, their fourth studio album, was released in November 2013 to minor commercial success, but 2017's Haiku from Zero failed to match the performance of its predecessors.

== Albums ==
=== Studio albums ===
List of studio albums, with selected chart positions and certifications
Title	Details	Peak chart positions										Certifications
Title	Details	AUS	AUS Dance	CAN	FIN	IRE	SWE	UK	UK Dance	US	US Dance	Certifications
Bright Like Neon Love	Released: 5 April 2004; Label: Modular; Formats: CD, LP, digital download	— (Note: Bright Like Neon Love did not enter the Australian ARIA Albums Chart but peaked at number 19 on the ARIA Hitseekers Chart.)	10	—	—	—	—	—	14	—	—	
In Ghost Colours	Released: 22 March 2008; Label: Modular; Formats: CD, LP, digital download	1	1	—	32	—	—	118	—	167	6	ARIA: Gold
Zonoscope	Released: 4 February 2011; Label: Modular; Formats: CD, LP, digital download	3	2	33	—	65	48	82	—	46	2	
Free Your Mind	Released: 1 November 2013; Label: Modular; Formats: CD, LP, digital download	19	2	—	—	—	—	146	12	98	6	
Haiku from Zero	Released: 22 September 2017; Label: Cutters, Astralwerks; Formats: CD, LP, cassette, digital download, streaming	59	7	—	—	—	—	—	—	— (Note: Haiku from Zero reached number 93 on Billboard's United States Top Current Albums chart, which only ranks the best-selling recently-released albums in the nation. It did not enter the magazine's general US album chart, the Billboard 200, which includes catalog releases in addition to current albums.)	11	
Freeze, Melt	Released: 21 August 2020; Label: Cutters, The Orchard; Formats: CD, digital download, streaming	53	—	—	—	—	—	— (Note: Freeze, Melt did not enter the UK Albums Chart, but peaked at number 69 on the UK Album Downloads Chart.)	5	—	—	
Moments	Released: 5 September 2025; Label: Cutters, Formats: CD, digital download, streaming	—	—	—	—	—	—	—	—	—	—	
"—" denotes a recording that did not chart or was not released in that territory.

=== DJ mix albums ===
List of DJ mix albums, with release date and label shown
Title	Details
FabricLive.29	Released: 14 August 2006; Label: Fabric; Formats: CD, digital download
So Cosmic	Released: 6 February 2008; Label: Modular; Formats: CD, digital download
Cut Copy Presents: Oceans Apart	Released: 7 November 2014; Label: Cutters; Format: Digital download, streaming
Forest Through the Trees	Released: 5 June 2015; Label: Cutters; Format: Digital download

== Extended plays ==
List of extended plays, with release date and label shown
Title	Details
I Thought of Numbers	Released: 10 September 2001; Label: Modular; Formats: CD, 12", download
A Tale of Two Journeys (Note: A Tale of Two Journeys was made available as a bonus EP with copies of Zonoscope sold via Urban Outfitters.)	Released: 2011; Label: None; Format: CD
January Tape	Released: 30 September 2016; Label: Cutters; Formats: Cassette, download, streaming
Haiku from Zero (Remixes)	Released: 9 November 2018; Label: Astralwerks; Formats: 12", download, streaming
Freeze, Melt (Remixes)	Released: 6 November 2020; Label: Cutters; Formats: download, streaming

== Singles ==
List of singles, with year released selected chart positions, and album name shown
Title	Year	Peak chart positions										Certifications	Album
Title	Year	AUS	AUS Dance	BEL (FL) Tip	BEL (WA) Tip	IRE	SCO	SWI	UK	UK Dance	US Dance	Certifications	Album
"1981" (UK vinyl only)	2001	—	—	—	—	—	—	—	—	—	—		Non-album single
"Rendezvous" (UK vinyl only)	2001	—	—	—	—	—	—	—	—	—	—		I Thought of Numbers
"Glittering Clouds" (vinyl only)	2001	—	—	—	—	—	—	—	—	—	—		I Thought of Numbers
"Future"	2003	—	—	—	—	—	81	—	137	31	—		Bright Like Neon Love
"Saturdays"	2004	—	—	—	—	—	—	—	—	40	—		Bright Like Neon Love
"Going Nowhere" (UK only)	2005	—	—	—	—	48	55	—	90	10	—		Bright Like Neon Love
"Hearts on Fire"	2007	98	9	20	—	—	75	—	— (Note: "Hearts on Fire" did not enter the UK Singles Chart, but peaked at number 65 on the UK Physical Singles Chart Top 100.)	3	—	ARIA: Gold	In Ghost Colours
"Lights & Music"	2008	64	8	22	—	—	54	98	— (Note: "Lights & Music" did not enter the UK Singles Chart, but peaked at number 37 on the UK Physical Singles Chart Top 100.)	—	—	ARIA: Platinum	In Ghost Colours
"Far Away"	2008	—	—	—	—	—	—	—	—	—	—		In Ghost Colours
"Take Me Over"	2010	— (Note: "Take Me Over" did not enter the Australian ARIA Singles Chart but peaked at number 10 on the ARIA Hitseekers Chart.)	—	—	36	—	—	—	— (Note: "Take Me Over" did not enter the UK Singles Chart, but peaked at number 55 on the UK Physical Singles Chart Top 100.)	—	44		Zonoscope
"Need You Now"	2011	—	—	—	—	—	—	—	— (Note: "Need You Now" did not enter the UK Singles Chart, but peaked at number 54 on the UK Physical Singles Chart Top 100.)	—	—		Zonoscope
"Blink and You'll Miss a Revolution"	2011	—	—	—	—	—	—	—	—	—	—		Zonoscope
"Sun God"	2012	—	—	—	—	—	—	—	— (Note: "Sun God" did not enter the UK Singles Chart, but peaked at number 53 on the UK Physical Singles Chart Top 100.)	—	—		Zonoscope
"Let Me Show You Love"	2013	—	—	—	—	—	—	—	—	—	—		Free Your Mind
"Free Your Mind"	2013	—	—	—	—	—	—	—	—	—	—		Free Your Mind
"In These Arms of Love" (Note: "In These Arms of Love" was released as a limited-edition 10" vinyl for Record Store Day 2014. It was then included in the expanded edition of Free Your Mind.)	2014	—	—	—	—	—	—	—	—	—	—		Free Your Mind
"Meet Me in a House of Love"	2014	—	—	—	—	—	—	—	—	—	—		Free Your Mind
"Airborne"	2017	—	—	—	—	—	—	—	—	—	—		Haiku from Zero
"Standing in the Middle of the Field"	2017	—	—	—	—	—	—	—	—	—	—		Haiku from Zero
"Black Rainbows"	2017	—	—	—	—	—	—	—	—	—	—		Haiku from Zero
"Ocean Blue"	2018	—	—	—	—	—	—	—	—	—	—		Non-album single
"Love Is All We Share"	2020	—	—	—	—	—	—	—	—	—	—		Freeze, Melt
"Cold Water"	2020	—	—	—	—	—	—	—	—	—	—		Freeze, Melt
"Like Breaking Glass"	2020	—	—	—	—	—	—	—	—	—	—		Freeze, Melt
"Solid"	2025	—	—	—	—	—	—	—	—	—	—		Moments
"When This Is Over"	2025	—	—	—	—	—	—	—	—	—	—		Moments
"Still See Love"	2025	—	—	—	—	—	—	—	—	—	—		Moments
"Belong to You" (featuring Kate Bollinger)	2025	—	—	—	—	—	—	—	—	—	—		Moments
"—" denotes a recording that did not chart or was not released in that territory.

=== Promotional singles ===
List of promotional singles, showing year released and album name
Title	Year	Album
"Drop the Bomb"	2001	I Thought of Numbers
"So Haunted"	2007	In Ghost Colours
"Where I'm Going"	2010	
"We Are Explorers"	2013	Free Your Mind

== Guest appearances ==
List of non-single guest appearances, showing year released and album name
Title	Year	Album
"Hunder Twasser"	2001	More Fish Out of Water
"Fantastic Voyages"	2012	Music Is... Awesome! Volume 4

== Remixes ==
List of remixes by Cut Copy for other artists
Title	Year	Artist
"The Light Brigade"	2003	Noonday Underground
"Night on Fire"	2004	VHS or Beta
"45 and Rising"	2005	Midnight Juggernauts
"No Way Out"	2005	Love of Diagrams
"Girl and the Sea"	2006	The Presets
"Kelly"	2006	Van She
"Dystopia"	2007	Midnight Juggernauts
"This Love"	2008	Maroon 5
"Move"	2008	CSS
"Kept Low"	2008	Mercy Arms
"Never Forget"	2008	Fleetwood Mac
"Never Miss a Beat"	2008	Kaiser Chiefs
"Paris Is Burning"	2008	Ladyhawke
"You Never See Me Back Down"	2009	Munk
"Happy House"	2009	The Juan MacLean
"Doors Unlocked and Open"	2011	Death Cab for Cutie
"Sail Away"	2012	The Rapture
"Uncertainty"	2014	Jagwar Ma
"Memories"	2019	Maroon 5
"Baby Blue"	2023	Luke Hemmings
"Under the Light"	2023	San Cisco

== Music videos ==
List of music videos, showing year released and directors
Title	Year	Director(s)
"Future"	2003	Jaron Albertin
"Going Nowhere"	2005	Kris Moyes
"Hearts on Fire"	2008	Nagi Noda
"Lights & Music"	2008	KROZM
"Need You Now"	2011	Keith Schofield
"Blink and You'll Miss a Revolution"	2011	Emile Sornin
"Take Me Over"	2012	Ryan Patrick
"Free Your Mind"	2013	Christopher Hill
"We Are Explorers"	2014	Masa Kawamura, Aramique and Qanta Shimuzu
"Meet Me in a House of Love"	2014	Trouble Hands
"Airborne"	2017	Gerson Aguerri
"Standing in the Middle of the Field"	2017	Vincenzi
"Black Rainbows"	2018	Annapurna Kumar
"Love Is All We Share"	2020	Takeshi Murata and Christopher Rutledge
