= Take Me Over =

Take Me Over may refer to:

- "Take Me Over" (Cut Copy song), 2010
- "Take Me Over" (Peking Duk song), 2014
