= Moments (Cut Copy album) =

Studio album by Cut Copy
- Released: 5 September 2025
- Studio: Music Farm Studio (Byron Bay)
- Genre: Alternative dance
- Length: 46:43
- Label: Cutters; The Orchard
- Producer: Dan Whitford

Cut Copy chronology
Freeze, Melt (2020)	Moments (2025)

Singles from Moments
- 1. "Solid" Released: 23 April 2025; 2. "When This Is Over" Released: 24 June 2025; 3. "Still See Love" Released: 6 August 2025; 4. "Belong to You" Released: 3 September 2025

Moments is the seventh album by Australian alternative dance band Cut Copy. It was released on 5 September 2025 via Cutters Records.

== Background ==
Moments was released five years after the band's previous studio effort, Freeze, Melt. Band's leader Dan Whitford said: "In that time I had a child, people around me fell in and out of relationships, the world went through a global pandemic and there has been a myriad of social and political upheaval. So I guess there's been a fair bit on my mind, and for me making this album has been a way of processing it all." The band had accumulated over 300 demos for the project. The material was recorded at Music Farm Studio near Byron Bay, Australia.

Moments features appearances from singer Kate Bollinger, musician Graham Lee and a children's choir from Candlebark School in Romsey, Australia. The album's artwork was created by Bráulio Amado.

== Release and promotion ==
In April 2025, Cut Copy released the first single from the album, "Solid", with a non-album B-side track "A Decade Long Sunset". It was followed up by "When This Is Over" in June, when the band simultaneously announced the title and release date of Moments. The third single was "Still See Love" in August, and the fourth and final one – "Belong to You" in September 2025. In November, a music video for the latter single was released.

To support the album, Cut Copy toured Australia, the US and Mexico in autumn 2025.

== Critical response ==
Professional ratings
Aggregate scores
Source	Rating
Album of the Year	65/100
Review scores
Source	Rating
AllMusic	3.5/5 stars
Ondarock	6/10
PopMatters	5/10
Spectrum Culture	69/100
Under the Radar	7/10 stars

The album was received moderately well by critics. Album of the Year, with four critic scores, rates it at a 65 out of 100.

Jimi Arundell of Under the Radar gave the album a 7/10, saying it contains "precise synth-pop perfectionism". Holly Hazelwood of Spectrum Culture called the band "downtempo wizards" giving the album a 69% rating. Other reviewers were more critical, such as Andrea Campana of Ondarock, stating the album is one of their "weaker, less engaging outputs". Matt Mahler of Pop Matters described it as a "half-hearted attempt" at an evolution.

Australian radio station Double J named Moments the 35th best album of 2025.

== Track listing ==
No.	Title	Length
1.	"Solid"	4:14
2.	"Belong to You" (featuring Kate Bollinger)	4:30
3.	"Still See Love"	3:54
4.	"When This Is Over"	4:24
5.	"Children of Fairlight"	5:06
6.	"Moments"	7:47
7.	"Gravity"	7:12
8.	"More Alive"	4:44
9.	"Find a Place Among the Stars"	4:48
Total length:		46:43

== Personnel ==
Cut Copy

- Dan Whitford – performance, production
- Tim Hoey – performance
- Mitchell Scott – performance
- Ben Browning – performance

Additional personnel

- Kate Bollinger – vocals (2)
- Graham Lee – steel guitar (2)
- Children's Choir from Candlebark School, Romsey, Australia – vocals (4)
- Georgia Brooks – conductor (4)

== Charts ==
Chart performance of Moments
Chart (2025)	Peak position
Australian Dance Albums (ARIA)	1
