= FabricLive.29 =

Compilation album by Cut Copy
- Released: August 2006
- Genre: Indie-rock, house, electronic music
- Label: Fabric

Cut Copy chronology
| Bright Like Neon Love (2004) | FabricLive.29 (2006) | In Ghost Colours (2008) |

FabricLive chronology
| FabricLive.28 (2006) | FabricLive.29 (2006) | FabricLive.30 (2006) |

FabricLive.29 is a DJ mix compilation album by Cut Copy released as part of the FabricLive Mix Series.

== Track listing ==
1. Joakim - I Wish You Were Gone - Versatile
2. Cut Copy - Future Unlimited - Modular
3. Munk - Disco Clown - Gomma
4. 2 tracks mixed:
  1. WhoMadeWho - Hello Empty Room - Gomma
  2. Cut Copy - Future Unlimited - Modular
5. New Young Pony Club - Get Dancey - alt< Recordings
6. In Flagranti - Bang Bang - Codek
7. Goldfrapp - Slide in (DFA Remix) - Mute
8. Severed Heads - Dead Eyes Opened (Extended Mix) - SevCom
9. WhoMadeWho - Out The Door (Super Discount Remix) - Gomma
10. Daft Punk - Face To Face - Virgin
11. The Presets - Truth and Lies - Modular
12. MSTRKRFT - Work On You - Last Gang
13. Casco Presents BWH - Stop - Radius
14. The Faint - Your Retro Career Melted (Ursula 1000 Urgent / Nervous Remix) - Saddle Creek
15. Soulwax - E Talking" (Tiga's Disco Drama Remix) - PIAS
16. Ciccone Youth - Into The Groovey - Ciccone Youth
17. Justice - Waters of Nazareth (Erol's Dur Dur Durrr Re-Edit) - Ed Banger
18. Grauzone - Eisbär - Welt
19. Riot In Belgium - The Acid Never Lies - Relish
20. Midnight Juggernauts - Shadows - Cutters
21. Fred Falke - Omega Man - Work It Baby
22. Daniel Diamond - Champu - City Rockers
23. Roxy Music - Angel Eyes - EMI
24. Cut Copy - Going Nowhere (Whitey Remix) - Modular
25. Cut Copy - Dream Sequence - Modular
