= Tsunehisa Kimura =

Japanese artist

- Born: 1928
- Died: 2008 (aged 79–80)
- Notable work: Visual Scandals
- Style: Photomontage, Surrealism, Pop Art

Tsunehisa Kimura (木村恒久, Kimura Tsunehisa; 1928–2008) was a Japanese artist influential in graphic design.

== Style ==
Kimura's photomontage imagine a surreal world of ongoing apocalypse and often showcase the encroachment of nature and natural phenomenon on man-made structures and the urban built environment.

His most famous ‘Visual Scandals’ series was published in book form by Parco, Tokyo in 1979.

== In popular culture ==
Kimura provided the cover artwork to Midnight Oil's 1984 album Red Sails in the Sunset. Additionally, altered versions of his work Toshi Wa Sawayakana Asa Wo Mukaeru were used for the cover art of Climax Blues Band's 1980 album Flying the Flag, Cut Copy's 2011 album Zonoscope, and Blu's 2013 album York. Cut Copy would eventually go on to win the Artisan Award for Best Cover Art at the ARIA Music Awards of 2011.

Design commentators have drawn attention to similarities between Kimura's work and the CGI envisioning of the Tom Cruise film Oblivion, particularly in the design of promotional material.
