= Drugdealer (musician) =

American musician (born 1977)

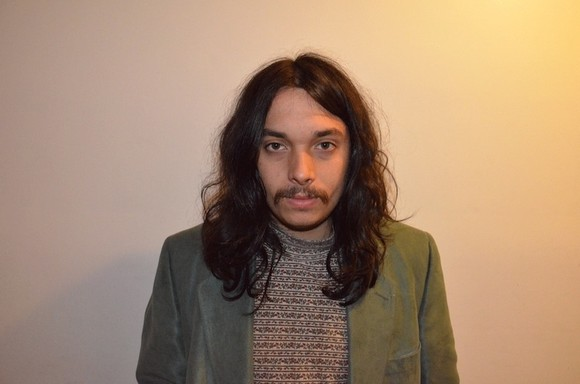
- Drugdealer in 2016

Background information
- Also known as: Salvia Plath; Run DMT
- Born: 1987 or 1988 (age 38–39); Boston, USA
- Genre: Psychedelic rock
- Years active: 2012–present
- Labels: Domino; Weird World; Mexican Summer
- Website: drugdealermusic.com

Michael Collins, known as Drugdealer, is an American psychedelic rock musician. He has previously released music under the monikers Salvia Plath and Run DMT.

== Early life and education ==
Collins was born in Boston in 1987 or 1988. He grew up in a farmhouse in Long Island. He describes having felt it difficult to connect to his community, as they were "very WASPy [WASP being American slang for super privileged, rich East Coasters, desived from White Anglo-Saxon Protestant]".

Collins moved to Baltimore when he was 18 to attend art school.

Collins has said that he does not really know how to play musical instruments, but learnt to make music by "just making one good sound and then reflecting on it for a while".

== Career ==
=== Run DMT ===
Collins began releasing music under the moniker Run DMT. However, in 2012, he changed, with NME reporting that this was due to an "aggressive dubstep group" (i.e. Run-DMC) threatening him with legal action, although Collins described this as a "silly rumour". Collins has described both of these names as being chosen to "monetise drug culture".

Loud and Quiet described the sound of Run DMT as having "a minimal heartbeat inspired by cinematic repetition and warm, experimental sound."

=== One Hitter Wonders ===
Collins asked the general public to write songs or poems for him in a project called One Hitter Wonders. The project caught the attention of Weird World, an imprint of Domino.

=== Salvia Plath ===
In 2013, Collins released The Bardo Story as Salvia Plath on Weird World. The record was described by NME as sounding like a "collection of rediscovered ’60s and ’70s gems uploaded to YouTube"; and Loud and Quiet as "the prettiest of psych pop that jangles with a sparkly lustre"

=== Drugdealer ===
In 2016, Collins released The End of Comedy, his first album under the name Drugdealer. The record featured Ariel Pink, Weyes Blood, and members of Mac DeMarco's band. It was received well by critics; Pitchfork described the album as his "most focused effort yet", while The Guardian called it a "delicious surprise".

In 2019, Collins released his second album as Drugdealer, Raw Honey, which again featured Weyes Blood on vocals as well as engineering by Mac DeMarco.

In 2022, Collins released his third album as Drugdealer, Hiding in Plain Sight through Mexican Summer. Multiple songs featured guest vocals from other solo artists including Tim Presley and Kate Bollinger.

=== Other activity ===
In early 2025, Collins featured on Late Night with Jimmy Fallon as a viewer has sent in a note that the two look alike.

Collins collaborated again with Weyes Blood on the 2025 single "Real Thing".

== Discography ==
=== As Drugdealer ===
==== Albums ====
- The End of Comedy (Weird World, 2016)
- Raw Honey (Mexican Summer, 2019)
- Hiding in Plain Sight (Mexican Summer, 2022)

==== Singles/EPs ====
- Suddenly with Weyes Blood (Weird World, 2016)
- Fools (Mexican Summer, 2019)
- Real Thing with Weyes Blood (Mexican Summer, 2025)

=== As Salvia Plath ===
- The Bardo Story (Weird World, 2013)

== Personal life ==
Collins has previously lived in New York, and is currently based in Los Angeles.
