= Babe Rainbow =

Babe Rainbow may refer to:

- Babe Rainbow (album), by British alternative rock band The House of Love
- Babe Rainbow (band), Australian psychedelic rock band
- Babe Rainbow (musician), Canadian EDM musician
- Babe Rainbow, a painting by Peter Blake
