= Dystopia (Midnight Juggernauts album) =

Studio album by Midnight Juggernauts
- Released: 4 August 2007 (Australia)
- Length: 50:13
- Label: Siberia

Midnight Juggernauts chronology
| Secrets of the Universe (2006) | Dystopia (2007) | The Crystal Axis (2010) |

Dystopia is the debut album by Australian electronic band Midnight Juggernauts, released in August 2007 by record label Siberia.

Recorded By, Engineer, Mixed By – Finn Keane

At the J Awards of 2007, the album was nominated for Australian Album of the Year.

== Release ==
Dystopia was released on 4 August 2007. It debuted and peaked at number 21 on the ARIA Albums Chart. A limited edition two-disc version with remixes and songs from previous releases was also released.

== Reception ==
Professional ratings
Aggregate scores
| Source | Rating |
|---|---|
| Metacritic | 71/100 |
Review scores
| Source | Rating |
| AllMusic | 4/5 stars |
| Pitchfork | 5.1/10 |

AllMusic wrote "few bands sound so confident with their sound and clear in their intentions even after several albums, and very few are capable of making a record this good."

== Track listing ==
| No. | Title | Length |
|---|---|---|
| 1. | "Intro" | 0:57 |
| 2. | "Ending of an Era" | 4:51 |
| 3. | "Into the Galaxy" | 4:54 |
| 4. | "Shadows" | 4:17 |
| 5. | "Worlds Converged" | 2:03 |
| 6. | "Dystopia" | 2:55 |
| 7. | "Road to Recovery" | 6:21 |
| 8. | "Scorpius" | 1:18 |
| 9. | "Twenty Thousand Leagues" | 4:26 |
| 10. | "Tombstone" | 4:04 |
| 11. | "Nine Lives" | 4:36 |
| 12. | "So Many Frequencies" | 3:41 |
| 13. | "Aurora" | 5:52 |

iTunes Australia exclusive track
| No. | Title | Length |
|---|---|---|
| 14. | "Out to the Storm" | 3:44 |

Digital download edition bonus track
| No. | Title | Length |
|---|---|---|
| 14. | "Hearts on Fire (Midnight Juggernauts Remix)" |

Limited edition bonus disc
| No. | Title | Length |
|---|---|---|
| 1. | "45 & Rising" (from Secrets of the Universe EP) | 3:18 |
| 2. | "Raised by Wolves" (from Midnight Juggernauts EP) | 3:56 |
| 3. | "Jump the Gun" (from Vice Sampler #1) | 3:09 |
| 4. | "Shadows (Ajax Remix)" (from "Shadows" 12") | 5:32 |
| 5. | "Tombstone (Comets Remix)" (from Shadows 12") | 6:58 |
| 6. | "45 & Rising (Live) (Unreleased)" | 4:44 |
