= In Ghost Colours =

Studio album by Cut Copy
- Released: 22 March 2008
- Recorded: 2007
- Studio: DFA (New York City); CCHQ (Melbourne)
- Genre: Electropop; alternative dance; dance-punk
- Length: 50:35
- Label: Modular
- Producer: Cut Copy; Tim Goldsworthy

Cut Copy chronology
Bright Like Neon Love (2004)	In Ghost Colours (2008)	Zonoscope (2011)

Singles from In Ghost Colours
- 1. "Hearts on Fire" Released: 26 May 2007; 2. "Lights & Music" Released: 19 February 2008; 3. "Far Away" Released: 2008

In Ghost Colours is the second studio album by Australian electronic music band Cut Copy, released on 22 March 2008 by Modular Recordings. It comprises 15 tracks, including a re-recorded version of the single "Hearts on Fire". The album was originally planned as an Australian release for 2007, but was delayed until 2008 to accommodate a simultaneous international release of the recording.

At the J Awards of 2008, the album was nominated for Australian Album of the Year.

The album was produced in New York by Tim Goldsworthy, although the band's US label Interscope initially suggested they work with Timbaland. As of June 2008, the album had sold 24,000 copies in the United States, according to Nielsen SoundScan.

== Structure and style ==
The album's sound has been mostly noticed for its positive, uptempo melodies, and its juxtaposition of numerous styles. The Australian website FasterLouder called In Ghost Colours "an album that draws together the sweaty live energy of an indie rock gig with the synths and bleeps of house and electronica, along with the ever-present 80s influence and now, even a dash of 60s psychedelia thrown in for good measure." The lead vocalist, Dan Whitford, said that the sound of In Ghost Colours is the closest the band has come to the sound they are after:

The album is a lot more realised than the first one. I think all of us, when we think of the first one, we agree we sort of got half way there. But on the new one we got a lot closer to the sort of sounds we're after. There are some different aspects to it – more layered, more dynamic, as well as some more loud, dance-y sections to it. And with the guitar there were many-layered sections as well. It got the real highs and lows, the real floaty bits, which I think is sort of a secret to our sound, with a lot of segues so that it just sort of flows together. And I think it's a lot more, kind of... complete.

Pitchfork's review said, "If the pastichey Bright Like Neon Love felt more like an opportunistic patchwork quilt of other people's sounds and ideas, the hugely enjoyable In Ghost Colours feels light, confident, and unencumbered by the dictates of fashion."

== Release and reception ==
Professional ratings
Aggregate scores
Source	Rating
Metacritic	79/100
Review scores
Source	Rating
AllMusic	4.5/5 stars
Alternative Press	4/5 stars
Consequence of Sound	4.5/5 stars
Entertainment Weekly	B−
The Irish Times	4/5 stars
Pitchfork	8.8/10
Q	3/5 stars
Spin	3.5/5 stars
The Sunday Times	5/5 stars
URB	4/5 stars

In Ghost Colours was released in Australia on 22 March 2008, in the United Kingdom on 5 May 2008 and in the United States on 8 April 2008. It was the band's first entry into the Australian ARIA Albums Chart, reaching number one on 30 March 2008, and the band's first entry on the Billboard 200, where it debuted at number 167.

In Ghost Colours received generally positive reviews from music critics. At Metacritic, which assigns a normalised rating out of 100 to reviews from mainstream critics, the album has received an average score of 79, based on 17 reviews. K. Ross Hoffman at AllMusic praised the album, writing, "To be sure, In Ghost Colours is a triumph of craftsmanship rather than vision – a synthesis and refinement of existing sounds rather than anything dramatically new and original – but it is an unalloyed triumph nonetheless, and one of the finest albums of its kind." Mark Pytlik of Pitchfork found In Ghost Colours enjoyable and praised the album's cheerfulness, calling it "a hard record not to love" and assigning it a "Best New Music" designation. Pitchfork later named it the fourth best record of 2008.

Robert Christgau gave In Ghost Colours a two-star honourable mention rating, indicating a "likable effort consumers attuned to its overriding aesthetic or individual vision may well enjoy", and cited "Out There on the Ice" and "Hearts on Fire" as highlights. In a less positive review, Dave Hughes of Slant Magazine criticised the album for being unfocused. Youyoung Lee of Entertainment Weekly called the album "uneven", writing that "for every pump-your-fist gem like 'Hearts on Fire,' there's a lifeless cut like the clanky 'Silver Thoughts,' which feels like a sonic hangover."

=== Accolades ===
Accolades for In Ghost Colours
Publication	Country	Accolade	Year	Rank	Ref.
Drowned in Sound	UK	50 Best Albums of the Year	2008	3	
Montreal Mirror	Canada	50 Best Albums of the Year	2008	—	
Pitchfork	US	50 Best Albums of the Year	2008	4	
Pitchfork	US	The Top 200 Albums of the 2000s	2009	61	
The Sunday Times	UK	100 Best Albums of the Year	2008	2	

== Track listing ==
All tracks are written by Cut Copy.

No.	Title	Length
1.	"Feel the Love"	4:28
2.	"Out There on the Ice"	4:58
3.	"Lights and Music"	4:37
4.	"We Fight for Diamonds"	1:02
5.	"Unforgettable Season"	3:13
6.	"Midnight Runner"	2:32
7.	"So Haunted"	4:27
8.	"Voices in Quartz"	1:21
9.	"Hearts on Fire"	4:53
10.	"Far Away"	4:56
11.	"Silver Thoughts"	0:29
12.	"Strangers in the Wind"	4:44
13.	"Visions"	1:09
14.	"Nobody Lost, Nobody Found"	4:39
15.	"Eternity One Night Only"	3:06
Total length:		50:34

UK edition bonus track
No.	Title	Length
16.	"Cold Youth"	4:58
Total length:		55:32

Japanese edition bonus tracks
No.	Title	Length
16.	"Hearts on Fire" (Midnight Juggernauts remix)	4:31
17.	"Hearts on Fire" (Calvin Harris remix)	5:40
18.	"Lights and Music" (Boys Noize remix)	5:21
19.	"Lights and Music" (Moulinex remix)	5:17
Total length:		71:23

== Personnel ==
Credits adapted from the liner notes of In Ghost Colours.

- Cut Copy – production
- Tim Goldsworthy – production, mixing
- Eric Broucek – production assistance
- John Fields – production assistance, mixing (tracks 1–3, 7)
- Atom – mixing assistance (tracks 1–3, 7)
- Dan Whitford – additional mixing
- Tim Hoey – additional mixing
- Warwick Baker – cover concept, art direction, layout

== Charts ==
=== Weekly charts ===
Chart (2008)	Peak position
Australian Albums (ARIA)	1
Australian Dance Albums (ARIA)	1
Finnish Albums (Suomen virallinen lista)	32
UK Albums (OCC)	118
US Billboard 200	167
US Independent Albums (Billboard)	21
US Top Dance Albums (Billboard)	6

=== Year-end charts ===
Chart (2008)	Position
Australian Dance Albums (ARIA)	13

== Certifications ==
Region	Certification	Certified units/sales
Australia (ARIA)	Gold	35,000^{^}
^{^} Shipments figures based on certification alone.
