= Hearts on Fire (Cut Copy song) =

Single by Cut Copy

from the album In Ghost Colours
- Released: 26 May 2007
- Recorded: 2007
- Genre: Synth-pop; house
- Length: 5:36 (original version); 4:53 (album version)
- Label: Modular
- Songwriter: Cut Copy
- Producer: Cut Copy

Cut Copy singles chronology
"Going Nowhere" (2005)	"Hearts on Fire" (2007)	"Lights & Music" (2008)

"Hearts on Fire" is a song by Australian electronic music band Cut Copy, released in 2007 as the lead single from their second studio album, In Ghost Colours (2008). The song's chorus contains a small vocal sample from Jennifer Lopez's "Waiting for Tonight". A re-edited version of the song, produced by Tim Goldsworthy, was released on 5 July 2008 and served as the album version. Pitchfork Media named "Hearts on Fire" the seventh best track of 2008.

== Music video ==
The music video, directed by Nagi Noda and shot on location in Japan, portrays a lovelorn frontman, Dan Whitford, suffering from a breakup. He is constantly followed by a rainy cloud hanging over his head, which represents his sadness. After time goes by (demonstrated by the growth of his dog), he finally lets go of the pain and continues his life without the rain following him, until the very end of the video, during which he runs into his ex-girlfriend, causing the rain to resume.

== Track listings ==
- Australian iTunes EP (2007)
1. "Hearts on Fire" – 5:36
2. "Hearts on Fire" (Joakim Remix) – 8:54
- Australian 12" single

A. "Hearts on Fire" – 5:32
B. "Hearts on Fire" (Joakim Remix) – 8:51

- Australian and UK CD single
1. "Hearts on Fire" (Radio Edit) – 3:40
2. "Hearts on Fire" (Calvin Harris Remix) – 5:39
3. "Hearts on Fire" (Midnight Juggernauts Remix) – 4:30
4. "Hearts on Fire" (Knightlife Remix) – 4:24
5. "Hearts on Fire" (video)
- Australian iTunes EP (2008)
1. "Hearts on Fire" – 4:52
2. "Hearts on Fire" (Calvin Harris Remix) – 5:39
3. "Hearts on Fire" (Midnight Juggernauts Remix) – 4:30
4. "Hearts on Fire" (Knightlife Remix) – 4:24
5. "Hearts on Fire" (J.P. Shilo Version) – 5:39
- UK iTunes EP
1. "Hearts on Fire" – 4:54
2. "Hearts on Fire" (Radio Edit) – 3:38
3. "Hearts on Fire" (Calvin Harris Remix) – 5:39
4. "Hearts on Fire" (Midnight Juggernauts Remix) – 4:30
5. "Hearts on Fire" (Knightlife Remix) – 4:24
6. "Hearts on Fire" (Holy Ghost! Remix) – 8:34
7. "Hearts on Fire" (JP Shilo Version) – 5:37
- UK 12" single

A1. "Hearts on Fire" (Full Length) – 4:52
A2. "Hearts on Fire" (Calvin Harris Remix) – 5:39
B1. "Hearts on Fire" (Midnight Juggernauts) – 4:30
B2. "Hearts on Fire" (Holy Ghost! Remix) – 8:34

== Personnel ==
Credits adapted from CD single liner notes.

- Cut Copy – production
- Alter – artwork, layout
- John Fields - mixing (album version)
- Tim Goldsworthy – production
- Nilesh Patel – mastering

== Charts ==
Chart (2008)	Peak position
Australian Singles Chart	98
Australian Dance Singles Chart	9
Belgian Tip Chart (Flanders)	20

== Certifications ==
Certifications for "Hearts on Fire"
Region	Certification	Certified units/sales
Australia (ARIA)	Gold	35,000^{‡}
^{‡} Sales+streaming figures based on certification alone.

== Release history ==
Region	Date	Label	Format(s)
Australia	26 May 2007	Modular	12" single
Australia	9 June 2007	Modular	Digital single
Australia	23 June 2007	Modular	Digital EP
Australia	5 July 2008	Modular	CD single; digital EP
United Kingdom	7 September 2008	Modular; Island	Digital EP
United Kingdom	8 September 2008	Modular; Island	CD single; 12" single
