= The Crystal Axis =

Studio album by Midnight Juggernauts
- Released: 28 May 2010 (Australia)
- Genres: Alternative dance, synthpop, electronica
- Length: 50:46
- Label: Siberia/Inertia

Midnight Juggernauts chronology
Dystopia (2007)	The Crystal Axis (2010)	Uncanny Valley (2013)

Singles from The Crystal Axis
- 1. "This New Technology" Released: 21 October 2009; 2. "Vital Signs" Released: 2 April 2010; 3. "Lifeblood Flow" Released: 30 July 2010; 4. "Lara Versus the Savage Pack" Released: October 2010

Professional ratings
Aggregate scores
Source	Rating
AnyDecentMusic?	6.8/10
Review scores
Source	Rating
AllMusic	3.5/5 stars
The New Zealand Herald	4/5
The Guardian	3/5 stars

The Crystal Axis is the second album from Australian electronic band Midnight Juggernauts. It was released on 28 May 2010. The album was the feature album on Triple J for the week of 24 to 30 May.

Some editions of The Crystal Axis feature a bonus second disc, titled the Surplus Maximus EP featuring remixes, covers and other songs from the album sessions.

At the AIR Awards of 2010, the album won Best Independent Dance/Electronic Album.

== Track listing ==
All tracks written by Midnight Juggernauts (Andrew Szekeres, Vincent Vendetta and Daniel Stricker).

No.	Title	Length
1.	"Induco"	1:59
2.	"Vital Signs"	5:23
3.	"Lifeblood Flow"	4:35
4.	"This New Technology"	4:17
5.	"Lara Versus the Savage Pack"	4:53
6.	"The Great Beyond"	5:48
7.	"Cannibal Freeway"	4:54
8.	"Virago"	3:29
9.	"Winds of Fortune"	3:08
10.	"Dynasty"	4:57
11.	"Lemuria"	1:15
12.	"Fade to Red"	6:11

iTunes Australia exclusive track
No.	Title	Length
13.	"Michael's Deadline"	4:14

CD bonus disc: The Surplus Maximus EP
No.	Title	Length
1.	"Fantastic Valleys"	2:04
2.	"Battlescars"	5:28
3.	"Virago Reprise (Windy Night)"	0:15
4.	"Get Connected"	5:13
5.	"Lara Versus the Savage Pack (Demo)"	5:12
6.	"Vital Signs (Tame Impala Cover)"	5:18
7.	"This New Technology (Emperor Machine Remix)"	8:43
