= Haiku from Zero =

Studio album by Cut Copy
- Released: 22 September 2017
- Recorded: 2016
- Studio: Maze Studios (Atlanta, Georgia)
- Genre: Indietronica; synth-pop; dance-rock
- Length: 42:08
- Label: Cutters; Astralwerks
- Producer: Dan Whitford; Ben H. Allen

Cut Copy chronology
Free Your Mind (2013)	Haiku from Zero (2017)	Freeze, Melt (2020)

Singles from Haiku From Zero
- 1. "Airborne" Released: 6 July 2017; 2. "Standing in the Middle of the Field" Released: 10 August 2017; 3. "Black Rainbows" Released: 15 September 2017

Haiku from Zero is the fifth studio album by Australian electronic music band Cut Copy. It was released on 22 September 2017 by Cutters Records and Astralwerks. The album was produced by Dan Whitford and Ben H. Allen. It spawned three singles: "Airborne", "Standing in the Middle of the Field" and "Black Rainbows".

== Background ==
Cut Copy worked on the album between 2014 and 2016, mostly remotely, using online file sharing to exchange ideas, due to the band members' dispersion to distant locations (Dan in Europe, Tim and Ben in the United States, and Mitchell in Australia). They would eventually get together in 2015 to record the new material in a studio in Atlanta, Georgia. The band was joined by Ben H. Allen with whom they had already worked on Zonoscope and who would end up as the producer of the album this time around. Dan Whitford said: "This is the first time we've gone into a recording studio and followed a traditional recording process in making an album".

In January 2016, the band took a break from working on the album, and instead recorded an instrumental ambient material in about 10 days. It was released as January Tape in September 2016 as a limited cassette run of 400 copies. In October, Dan Whitford revealed that the new album was about three quarters complete.

As opposed to every previous Cut Copy album, interludes between songs are absent on Haiku from Zero.

== Release and promotion ==
"Airborne" was released as the lead single from the album on 6 July 2017, followed by its music video on 20 July. The album's title and release date was announced on 10 August 2017, alongside the release of the next single "Standing in the Middle of the Field".

On 14 September, the album was made available for streaming on NPR's website, before being officially released worldwide on 22 September. "Black Rainbows" subsequently served as the third single from the album. Music video for "Standing in the Middle of the Field" premiered in October.

The band embarked on a tour across North America and Australia to support the album.

== Reception ==
Professional ratings
Aggregate scores
Source	Rating
AnyDecentMusic?	6.7/10
Metacritic	62/100
Review scores
Source	Rating
AllMusic	3.5/5 stars
Exclaim!	8/10
Pitchfork	6.3/10
PopMatters	6/10 stars
Record Collector	3/5 stars
Rolling Stone Australia	3.5/5 stars
Slant Magazine	3.5/5 stars
Sputnikmusic	3.3/5
Under the Radar	5/10 stars

Haiku from Zero received mixed to favourable reviews from professional music critics upon its initial release. At Metacritic, which assigns a normalised rating out of 100 to reviews from mainstream publications, the album received an average score of 62, based on 14 reviews, indicating "generally positive reviews". At AnyDecentMusic?, it scored 6.7 out of 10 points, based on 12 reviews.

In his review for AllMusic, Tim Sendra described Haiku from Zero as the band's "most straightforward, easy-to-swallow album yet", but also reflected that it is missing "inspiration or invention, which also means it is their least successful record yet as well."

Reviewer Rudy K. of Sputnikmusic described the album's energy as "impressive; the craft, even more so", but complained that it does not have "any sense of vision", summing it up as "a bunch of great songs and little else".

In a review for Exclaim!, Cam Lindsay praised the album as "another strong effort by a band that continue to celebrate the power of dance music".

== Track listing ==
Haiku from Zero track listing
No.	Title	Writer(s)	Length
1.	"Standing in the Middle of the Field"	Dan Whitford; Tim Hoey	5:30
2.	"Counting Down"	Whitford; Hoey; Mitchell Scott; Ben Browning	3:50
3.	"Black Rainbows"	Whitford; Hoey	4:08
4.	"Stars Last Me a Lifetime"	Whitford; Hoey	3:45
5.	"Airborne"	Whitford; Hoey; Browning	5:18
6.	"No Fixed Destination"	Whitford	4:13
7.	"Memories We Share"	Whitford; Hoey	5:02
8.	"Living Upside Down"	Whitford; Hoey	5:48
9.	"Tied to the Weather"	Whitford; Hoey	4:32
Total length:			42:08

== Personnel ==
Credits adapted from the liner notes of Haiku from Zero.

- Will Alexander – studio assistance
- Ben H. Allen – mixing, production
- Andrew Belanger – studio assistance
- Jordan Bridges – studio assistance
- Ben Etter – engineering, mixing assistance
- Jason Kingsland – engineering, vocal production
- Kegan Krogh – studio assistance
- Joe LaPorta – mastering
- Anthony Prince – studio assistance
- Dennis Schröder – studio assistance
- Tom Teters – photography
- Tommy Urbie – studio assistance
- Dan Whitford – artwork, production, vocals

== Charts ==
Chart (2017)	Peak position
Australian Albums (ARIA)	59
Australian Dance Albums (ARIA)	7
US Top Current Albums (Billboard)	93
US Top Alternative Album Sales (Billboard)	23
US Top Dance/Electronic Albums (Billboard)	11
US Top Rock Album Sales (Billboard)	37

== Release history ==
Region	Date	Format	Label	Ref.
Australia	22 September 2017	CD; digital download	Cutters; Astralwerks	
Europe	22 September 2017	CD; LP; digital download	Cutters; Astralwerks	
United States	22 September 2017	CD; LP; cassette; digital download	Cutters; Astralwerks	
