= Lights & Music =

Single by Cut Copy

from the album In Ghost Colours
- Released: 19 February 2008
- Recorded: 2007
- Genre: Synthpop, dance-punk
- Length: 4:37
- Label: Modular
- Songwriter(s): Cut Copy
- Producer(s): Cut Copy, Tim Goldsworthy

Cut Copy singles chronology
"Hearts on Fire" (2007)	"Lights & Music" (2008)	"Far Away" (2008)

"Lights & Music" is a song by Australian electronic music band Cut Copy, released as the second single from their second studio album, In Ghost Colours (2008). It is the band's most successful single to date, peaking at number 64 on the Australian Singles Chart. It was included in the video games FIFA 09 and Forza Horizon 3.

== Track listings ==
- Australian CD single
1. "Lights & Music" (Album Version) – 4:37
2. "Lights & Music" (Boys Noize Happy Birthday Remix) – 5:17
3. "Lights & Music" (Superdiscount Remix) – 7:03
4. "Lights & Music" (video)
- Australian and UK iTunes EP
1. "Lights & Music" (Single Version) – 4:59
2. "Lights & Music" (Boys Noize Remix) – 5:17
3. "Lights & Music" (Superdiscount Remix) – 7:03
- Australian limited edition 12" single

A. "Lights & Music" (Boys Noize Remix) – 5:16
B. "Lights & Music" (Superdiscount Remix) – 7:04

- UK CD single
1. "Lights & Music" (Single Version) – 4:59
2. "Lights & Music" (Boys Noize Happy Birthday Remix) – 5:17
3. "Lights & Music" (Superdiscount Remix) – 7:03
4. "Lights & Music" (video)
- UK 7" single

A. "Lights & Music"

- UK 12" single

A1. "Lights & Music" (Original)
A2. "Lights & Music" (Superdiscount Remix) – 7:03
B1. "Lights & Music" (Boys Noize Happy Birthday Remix) – 5:17

- UK iTunes single
1. "Lights & Music" (Radio Edit) – 3:38

== Personnel ==
Credits adapted from CD single liner notes.

- Cut Copy – production
- Alter – artwork, layout
- Eric Broucek – engineering
- John Fields – mixing (original version)
- Tim Goldsworthy – additional programming, production
- Nilesh Patel – mastering

== Charts ==
=== Weekly charts ===
Chart (2008)	Peak position
Australian Singles Chart	64
Australian Dance Singles Chart	8
Belgian Tip Chart (Flanders)	22

=== Year-end charts ===
Chart (2008)	Position
Australian Dance Singles Chart	32

== Certifications ==
Certifications for "Lights & Music"
Region	Certification	Certified units/sales
Australia (ARIA)	Platinum	70,000^{‡}
^{‡} Sales+streaming figures based on certification alone.

== Release history ==
Region	Date	Label	Format(s)
Australia	19 February 2008	Modular Recordings	Digital EP
Australia	1 March 2008	Modular Recordings	CD single, 12" single, digital single
United Kingdom	2 May 2008	Modular Recordings, Island Records	Digital single, digital EP
United Kingdom	5 May 2008	Modular Recordings, Island Records	CD single, 7" single, 12" single
