= Secrets of the Universe =

Midnight Juggernauts

EP by Midnight Juggernauts
- Released: 27 May 2006 (Australia)
- Genre: Electronica
- Length: 22:55
- Label: Siberia/Inertia
- Producer: Midnight Juggernauts

Midnight Juggernauts chronology
Midnight Juggernauts (2006)	Dystopia (2007)

Professional ratings
Review scores
Source	Rating
Faster Louder	positive
In the Mix	positive

Secrets of the Universe is the second mini-album from Australian indie-synth band Midnight Juggernauts. It is the first release on the band's own label, Siberia.

The EP also includes a music video for "45 And Rising" by Chris Hill and Ewan McLeod.

== Track listing ==
1. "Shadows" – 4:15
2. "Devil Within" – 3:53
3. "Tombstone" – 3:59
4. "From The Deep" – 1:45
5. "45 And Rising" – 3:16
6. "Devil Within" (Presets Remix) – 5:47
