= Uncanny Valley (Midnight Juggernauts album) =

Studio album by Midnight Juggernauts
- Released: 14 June 2013 (Australia)
- Length: 43:35
- Label: Siberia
- Producer: Midnight Juggernauts

Midnight Juggernauts chronology
The Crystal Axis (2010)	Uncanny Valley (2013)	Aerials EP (2014)

Singles from Uncanny Valley
- 1. "Ballad of the War Machine" Released: 5 March 2013; 2. "Memorium" Released: 30 May 2013; 3. "Systematic" Released: 25 November 2013

Professional ratings
Review scores
Source	Rating
Rolling Stone Australia	4/5 stars

Uncanny Valley is the third and final album from Australian electronic band Midnight Juggernauts. It was released on 14 June 2013 in Australia, and on later dates in June/July 2013 in other countries.

After their previous tour, the band took a few years break where they returned to focus on various experimental audio-visual projects. Eventually they started writing/recording sessions in a converted church in the French Loire Valley. They next released a music video anonymously, hidden under the guise of a Soviet pop band from the early 1980s. This Russian shot video unattributed to Midnight Juggernauts remained under this secret pretense for many weeks. When it was eventually recognised as a new Midnight Juggernauts track, it was then announced as Ballad of the War Machine on YouTube, and their album Uncanny Valley was released soon after in mid-2013.

Their hybrid video for Memorium was also notable for its imaginative approach. Premiered on The Creators Project it revealed the pioneer history of CGI, and gained much attention amongst the Computer Graphic/Technology communities.

The band toured behind the release with Tame Impala before starting their own album launch tours across the globe.

== Track listing ==
All tracks written by Midnight Juggernauts (Andrew Szekeres, Vincent Vendetta and Daniel Stricker).

No.	Title	Length
1.	"HCL"	4:54
2.	"Ballad of the War Machine"	4:00
3.	"Memorium"	4:51
4.	"Streets of Babylon"	4:24
5.	"Sugar and Bullets"	4:52
6.	"Master of Gold"	2:28
7.	"Systematic"	3:55
8.	"Deep Blue Lines"	3:36
9.	"Another Land"	5:14
10.	"Melodiya"	5:21

iTunes Australia exclusive track
No.	Title	Length
11.	"Mystery Unwinds"	4:07
