= Babe Rainbow (musician) =

Canadian musician and record producer

- Origin: Vancouver, British Columbia, Canada
- Genres: Indie electronic Hip hop Electronic; Ambient; Experimental; Instrumental; Downtempo; Dubstep
- Years active: 2008–present
- Labels: Warp Records, Slow Release, Ghostly International, INgrooves, 1080p Collection

Babe Rainbow is the moniker of Canadian musician Cameron Reed. Reed first came to prominence following the release of two records as Babe Rainbow on the UK-based Warp Records, Shaved EP in 2010 and Endless Path EP in 2011. Mixing the genres of Dubstep, ambient, hip-hop, and Noise music, Babe Rainbow's early Post-dubstep material was described as "creating "overcast, suffocating sonic landscapes" that evoke a sound "like living in a haunted house".

In addition to providing official remixes for artists such as Grimes, Midnight Juggernauts, and Jokers of the Scene, Reed has provided production to up-and-coming rappers and occasionally releases free EPs of demos and works-in-progress.

In 2012, Reed briefly joined the backing band for Domino Records-signed R&B artist How To Dress Well before going on to release an EP of minimalist piano compositions titled Minnesota Winter EP, and Falling Apart EP which Pitchfork Media called "a momentous, sometime triumphant gloom that recalls a range of other electronic experimentalists".

== Studio releases ==
Year	Release details
2010	Shaved EP: Released: February 8, 2010; Label: Warp Records
2011	Endless Path EP: Released: June 11, 2011; Label: Warp Records
2014	Minnesota Winter EP: Released: September 26, 2014; Label: Slow Release
2014	Falling Apart EP: Released: July 14, 2014; Label: Slow Release
2018	Neglected Ambient Works Vol. 1 (as Cameron Reed): Released: Nov. 16, 2018; Label: Slow Release

== Remixes and singles ==
Year	Release details
2010	Babe Rainbow I Can Try To Run (Stuck): Label: Tri Angle (record label)
2010	Midnight Juggernauts This New Technology (Babe Rainbow Remix): Label: Acephalé
2010	You Say Party Dark Days (Babe Rainbow Remix): Label: Paper Bag Records
2011	Porcelain Raft Talk To Me (Babe Rainbow Remix): Label: Acephalé
2011	Grimes Crystal Ball (Babe Rainbow Remix): Label: Not On Label
2011	Main Attrakionz Who Am I (Prod. by Babe Rainbow): Label: Not On Label
2011	Babe Rainbow Give You Time (feat. Ashley Webber): Label: Ghostly International / Adult Swim
2012	Jokers of the Scene Killing Jokes (Babe Rainbow Remix): Label: Fool's Gold Records
2012	Babe Rainbow & 5kinAndBone5 Did You Knock: Label: Unknown To The Unknown
2015	Babe Rainbow Don't Tell Me I'm Wrong: Label: Ghostly International / Adult Swim
