= Free Your Mind (Cut Copy album) =

Studio album by Cut Copy
- Released: 1 November 2013
- Recorded: Adelphia Studios (Fitzroy, Victoria); Sing Sing Studios (Cremorne, Victoria)
- Genres: Synth-pop; indietronica; house; dance-punk
- Length: 50:32
- Label: Modular
- Producers: Dave Fridmann; Dan Whitford

Cut Copy chronology
Zonoscope (2011)	Free Your Mind (2013)	Haiku from Zero (2017)

Singles from Free Your Mind
- 1. "Let Me Show You Love" Released: 6 September 2013; 2. "Free Your Mind" Released: 11 October 2013; 3. "Meet Me in a House of Love" Released: 1 September 2014

Free Your Mind is the fourth studio album by Australian electronic music band Cut Copy, released on 1 November 2013 by Modular Recordings. The album was produced by frontman Dan Whitford, with mixing and additional production by Dave Fridmann. It spawned the singles "Let Me Show You Love", "Free Your Mind" and "Meet Me in a House of Love".

== Background ==
Produced by frontman Dan Whitford, Free Your Mind was recorded in Cut Copy's hometown of Melbourne and later mixed by Dave Fridmann in Upstate New York. According to its press release, the album was inspired by the two different Summers of Love (San Francisco's in 1967 and Britain's in 1988 and 1989). "The concept of freedom is one that's universally positive and timeless, and whatever each person's version of that freedom is, it's a good thing to be reminding people or even just ourselves to be 'free'", Whitford stated.

Whitford said that Free Your Mind contains "hints of everything from ELO and OMD to the Orb and Primal Scream".

== Release and promotion ==
Cut Copy revealed the single "Let Me Show You" (eventually retitled "Let Me Show You Love") at the CHIRP Record Fair at the Pitchfork Music Festival in Chicago over the weekend of 19–21 July 2013, where 120 copies of the 12-inch vinyl were lathe-cut on-site and sold to fans. "Let Me Show You Love" was officially streamed on 29 July through the band's SoundCloud page, and was released as a digital single on 6 September.

In early September 2013, the title track was unveiled via six billboards that read "Free Your Mind", each placed at specific locations worldwide—Mexico City; Santiago, Chile; Moora, Australia; Blaina, Wales; Detroit, Michigan and the California desert. In order to hear the song, fans were instructed to visit one of the billboards and open the band's website on their iPhone or Android.

"Free Your Mind" made its official debut online on 9 September, while a digital bundle containing remixes by Spiritualized and Fort Romeau was released on 11 October. The accompanying music video, directed by Christopher Hill, premiered on 10 October and stars Swedish actor Alexander Skarsgård as a cult leader.

On 10 September 2013, the band announced a world tour in support of the album, which kicked off in Salt Lake City, Utah on 30 October, and ended in Copenhagen, Denmark on 13 December. The entire album was made available for streaming on 24 October.

In October 2013, Cut Copy shared the tracks "We Are Explorers" and "Take Me Higher" via SoundCloud; the band had previously debuted the former at a show in Charlottesville, Virginia on 6 June 2013, under the title "Explorers". The group also performed "We Are Explorers" on Late Night with Jimmy Fallon on 19 November 2013.

The video for "We Are Explorers", directed by Aramique Krauthamer and Masa Kawamura, premiered on 21 February 2014 and was created with special characters made using a 3D printer. A bundle containing the files for the 3D prints was released via BitTorrent to allow fans to print and create their own videos. "Meet Me in a House of Love" was released on 1 September 2014 as the album's third and final single.

== Reception ==
Professional ratings
Aggregate scores
Source	Rating
AnyDecentMusic?	6.4/10
Metacritic	68/100
Review scores
Source	Rating
AllMusic	4/5 stars
The A.V. Club	B−
Consequence of Sound	4/5 stars
Exclaim!	9/10
The Guardian	2/5 stars
Mojo	3/5 stars
NME	7/10
Pitchfork	6.4/10
Spin	4/10
Uncut	7/10

Free Your Mind was mostly well received by professional music critics upon its initial release. At Metacritic, which assigns a normalised rating out of 100 to reviews from mainstream publications, the album received an average score of 68, based on 26 reviews, indicating "generally positive reviews".

Amongst the more positive reviews for the album was the article written by Tim Sendra for AllMusic. In the 4 out of five star review, Sendra felt that compared to the band's previous albums it was "even bigger sounding and warmer. Taking tons of inspiration from the late-'80s and early-'90s club scene in the U.K. and touching on everything from the Hacienda-ready acid house to the thumping piano house of groups like Black Box, the album is a danceable love letter to the era. Almost every move the group makes is instantly familiar to anyone with any interest in that time period, but the band add more than enough of their own personality, as well as advanced skill at mixing and matching moods and feels, to keep it from being an empty exercise in nostalgia. Call it a full exercise instead." Philip Cosores graded the album a 'B grade in the review for Consequence of Sound, claiming "Music doesn’t need these kind of icky subtexts, especially music as open-hearted, brutally unhip, and purely enjoyable as Cut Copy has become. Dance tent, main stage, club, arena: The songs will connect anywhere, and when they tour the shit out of this album in 2014, only a fool would bet against this set of songs connecting everywhere."

While the album was well received in some publications, others were less positive in their assessment. Reviewing the album for PopMatters, Taylor Coe wrote "The major misstep on Free Your Mind is eschewing those decent lyrical impulses in favor of rather limp and unaccomplished (and repeated!) inanities such as "free your mind" and "shine on," phrases that should be confined, respectively, to the lexicons of aging hippies and Roger Waters." Kevin Liedel was also critical of the album in a 2.5 out of 5 star review for Slant Magazine, writing that "When not trudging through overly long tracks like "Let Me Show You Love" or clumsily paced ballads like "Walking in the Sky", the group attempts some M83-like vignettes in the form of moody, sample-filled tracks, which are numerous (five in all), but entirely inconsequential. Cut Copy plows forward on Free Your Mind's latter tracks, especially "Take Me Higher", but the neon-slicked dynamism that defined their songwriting for three straight albums is absent, leaving their once-sleek, libertine melodies unwieldy and limp." Similarly, writer Paul MacInnes stated in a review for The Guardian that "There's something insistently clear-eyed about this album and it somewhat ruins the magic in the process. Without the trippy grit you're left in a happy hippy wonderland, conscious that the melodies are thin, the lyrics trite ... and the composite elements dully familiar."

== Track listing ==
No.	Title	Writer(s)	Length
1.	"(intro)"	Dan Whitford	0:20
2.	"Free Your Mind"	Whitford; Tim Hoey; Mitchell Scott; Ben Browning	4:57
3.	"We Are Explorers"	Whitford; Hoey; Scott	4:18
4.	"Let Me Show You Love"	Whitford; Hoey; Scott; Andy Williams; Carl Thomas; Russ Morgan; Paul Roberts; Jon Kingsley Hall; George Stewart; Nicholas Whitecross	5:56
5.	"(into the desert)"	Whitford	1:28
6.	"Footsteps"	Whitford	4:42
7.	"In Memory Capsule"	Whitford; Hoey; Scott; Browning	4:40
8.	"(above the city)"	Whitford	0:32
9.	"Dark Corners & Mountain Tops"	Whitford; Hoey; Scott; Browning	5:07
10.	"Meet Me in a House of Love"	Whitford; Hoey; Scott; Browning	6:09
11.	"Take Me Higher"	Whitford; Hoey; Scott; Browning	5:52
12.	"(the waves)"	Whitford	0:45
13.	"Walking in the Sky"	Whitford; Hoey; Scott; Browning	3:31
14.	"Mantra"	Whitford	2:15
Total length:			50:32

Digital deluxe edition bonus tracks
No.	Title	Writer(s)	Length
15.	"Believers"	Whitford; Hoey; Scott; Browning; Julian Hamilton	4:34
16.	"Like Any Other Day"	Whitford; Scott	5:16
17.	"Lights Shine On"	Whitford; Hoey; Scott; Browning	4:09
18.	"I Wish the Sun Would Grow Today"	Whitford; Hoey; Scott; Browning	3:34
19.	"In These Arms of Love"	Whitford; Hoey	4:22
Total length:			72:42

== Personnel ==
Credits adapted from the liner notes of Free Your Mind.

- Dan Whitford – vocals, artwork, design, production
- Vika Bull – additional vocals (tracks 2, 4, 7, 10, 11)
- Andrew Everding – mixing assistance
- Dave Fridmann – additional production, mixing
- Michael Fridmann – mixing assistance
- Julian Hamilton – additional arrangement (tracks 2, 3, 7, 10)
- Benny Harwood – extra pedals, gear (tracks 2, 3, 7, 9, 10, 13, 14)
- Anna Laverty – additional recording (tracks 2, 4, 7, 10, 11, 13)
- Mike Marsh – mastering
- Matt Neighbor – additional assistant recording (tracks 2, 4, 7, 10, 11, 13)
- Rene Vaile – additional sleeve photography
- Mirko Vogel – recording (tracks 2, 3, 7, 9, 10, 13, 14)
- Wizard – assistant recording

== Charts ==
Chart (2013)	Peak position
Australian Albums Chart	19
Australian Dance Albums Chart	2
UK Albums Chart	146
UK Dance Albums Chart	12
UK Independent Albums Chart	25
US Billboard 200	98
US Alternative Albums	17
US Dance/Electronic Albums	6

== Release history ==
Region	Date	Format	Edition	Label	Ref.
Australia	1 November 2013	CD; LP; digital download	Standard	Modular	
France	4 November 2013	Digital download	Standard	Modular	
Germany	4 November 2013	Digital download	Standard	Modular	
Netherlands	4 November 2013	CD; digital download	Standard	Modular	
Sweden	4 November 2013	CD; LP; digital download	Standard	Modular	
United Kingdom	4 November 2013	CD; LP; digital download	Standard	Modular	
United States	5 November 2013	CD; digital download	Standard	Loma Vista; Republic	
Germany	8 November 2013	CD	Standard	Modular	
Germany	15 November 2013	LP	Standard	Modular	
France	18 November 2013	LP	Standard	Barclay	
United States	19 November 2013	LP	Standard	Loma Vista; Republic	
France	25 November 2013	CD	Standard	Barclay	
Australia	18 July 2014	Digital download	Deluxe	Modular	
France	21 July 2014	Digital download	Deluxe	Modular	
United Kingdom	21 July 2014	Digital download	Deluxe	Modular	
United States	22 July 2014	Digital download	Deluxe	Loma Vista; Republic	
Germany	23 July 2014	Digital download	Deluxe	Modular	
