= Freeze, Melt =

Studio album by Cut Copy
- Released: 21 August 2020
- Studio: CCHQ (Melbourne); Park Orchards (Melbourne)
- Genre: Synth-pop; ambient
- Length: 40:48
- Label: Cutters; The Orchard
- Producer: Dan Whitford

Cut Copy chronology
Haiku from Zero (2017)	Freeze, Melt (2020)	Moments (2025)

Singles from Freeze, Melt
- 1. "Love Is All We Share" Released: 8 May 2020; 2. "Cold Water" Released: 26 June 2020; 3. "Like Breaking Glass" Released: 5 August 2020

Freeze, Melt is the sixth studio album by Australian electronic music band Cut Copy. It was released on 21 August 2020 by Cutters Records and The Orchard. The album was produced by the band leader, Dan Whitford. Freeze, Melt spawned three singles: "Love Is All We Share", "Cold Water" and "Like Breaking Glass".

== Background ==
The album was written over three years, after Dan Whitford had relocated to Copenhagen, Denmark, and recorded in nine days in Park Orchards, Victoria, just outside Melbourne. Whitford said that before going into the studio, the band "only had two or three fully formed songs, and the rest were 30-minute sketch ideas that were pretty open ended. So, (...) we just worked on a lot of those ideas without really knowing where they were going to head. But it made the studio process a lot more fun." The first song created for the album was "Cold Water".

Musically, the material is a departure from Cut Copy's previous, more dance-oriented style and turns towards atmospheric, minimal ambient music. The more introspective nature of the album is a result of Whitford's life in a Scandinavia, where he was affected by the sense of isolaton upon entering a new country, and extreme winters with periods of no sunlight and sub-zero temperatures. Thematically, the material references climate change and environmental concerns, emotional states and human relationships. Shortly before the release of Freeze, Melt, Whitford noted that "the themes addressed throughout the album really suit the current times, where a lot of people are feeling physically isolated", referencing COVID-19 lockdowns.

== Release and promotion ==
On 8 May 2020, Cut Copy released the single "Love Is All We Share". It was followed by the second single, "Cold Water", on 26 June 2020, along with the announcement of the album release. The third single preceding the album, "Like Breaking Glass", was released on 5 August 2020. The singles were later remixed by Jacques Lu Cont, Kaitlyn Aurelia Smith, Octo Octa and Luke Abbott, among others. No music videos were made for the album, but all songs were accompanied by visualisers created by Takeshi Murata and Christopher Rutledge.

In August, the band announced a tour in Europe for spring 2021, however, these concerts did not take place due to the ongoing COVID-19 pandemic. Cut Copy toured North America in April and May 2022, Europe in October and November, and Australia between November 2022 and January 2023.

== Reception ==
Professional ratings
Aggregate scores
Source	Rating
AnyDecentMusic?	6.4/10
Metacritic	69/100
Review scores
Source	Rating
AllMusic	4/5 stars
Beats Per Minute	62%
Clash	8/10
Pitchfork	6.5/10
PopMatters	7/10
Slant Magazine	2.5/5 stars

Freeze, Melt received mixed to favourable reviews from professional music critics upon its initial release. At Metacritic, which assigns a normalised rating out of 100 to reviews from mainstream publications, the album received an average score of 69, based on 8 reviews, indicating "generally favorable reviews". At AnyDecentMusic?, it scored 6.4 out of 10 points.

In a positive review for AllMusic, Tim Sendra acclaimed Freeze, Melt as Cut Copy's "most inward looking and sparsely constructed work to date" and "a daring move for the band". Writing for Clash magazine, Josh Crowe concluded that it is "as meticulous as it is melancholy, which is what makes it so profoundly personal and universal at the same time". In a more critical review in the Slant Magazine, the album was described as "intriguingly knotty but a bit self-defeating".

== Track listing ==
Freeze, Melt track listing
No.	Title	Writer(s)	Length
1.	"Cold Water"	Dan Whitford; Ben Browning; Tim Hoey	5:11
2.	"Like Breaking Glass"	Whitford; Browning	4:51
3.	"Love Is All We Share"	Whitford	6:00
4.	"Stop, Horizon"	Whitford; Browning; Mitchell Scott; Hoey	5:28
5.	"Running in the Grass"	Whitford; Hoey	6:00
6.	"A Perfect Day"	Whitford	4:08
7.	"Rain"	Whitford; Scott	5:00
8.	"In Transit"	Whitford; Browning; Hoey	4:10
Total length:			40:48

== Personnel ==
Credits adapted from the album's liner notes.

=== Cut Copy ===
- Ben Browning – performance
- Tim Hoey – performance
- Mitchell Scott – performance
- Dan Whitford – performance, production, artwork

=== Additional contributors ===
- Haima Marriott – engineering, additional production, horn on "Love Is All We Share"
- Evan Lorden – session assistance
- Gillian Rivers – string arrangement on "Rain"
- Christoffer Berg – mixing
- Frida Claeson Johansson – mixing assistance
- Heba Kadry – mastering
- Rick Milovanovic – artwork
- Asako Narahashi – photography

== Charts ==
Chart performance of Freeze, Melt
Chart (2020)	Peak position
Australian Albums (ARIA)	53
UK Album Downloads (OCC)	69
UK Dance Albums (OCC)	5
