= Take Me Over (Cut Copy song) =

Single by Cut Copy

from the album Zonoscope
- Released: 23 November 2010
- Recorded: 2010
- Genre: Synthpop
- Length: 5:50 (album version); 3:55 (radio edit)
- Label: Modular
- Songwriter(s): Cut Copy
- Producer(s): Cut Copy

Cut Copy singles chronology
"Far Away" (2008)	"Take Me Over" (2010)	"Need You Now" (2011)

"Take Me Over" is a song by Australian electronic music band Cut Copy, released as the lead single from their third studio album, Zonoscope (2011). The song has become one of the band's most recognisable tunes. It was also met with positive critical reception, with critics noting the song's references to Fleetwood Mac's "Everywhere" and Men at Work's "Down Under".

== Music video ==
The music video for "Take Me Over" was filmed by Australian director Kris Moyes in Sydney in November 2010, featuring jungle scenes, an Indiana Jones-style wardrobe and nude models. The clip, however, was never released due to production delays. In May 2012, a fan made music video for the song premiered online, directed by Ryan Patrick, and was subsequently adopted as the official video.

== Track listings ==
- UK digital single
1. "Take Me Over" – 5:08
2. "Take Me Over" (The Loving Hand Remix) – 10:23
3. "Take Me Over" (Azari & III Remix) – 6:03
4. "Take Me Over" (Mylo Remix) – 6:56
5. "Take Me Over" (Flight Facilities Remix) – 6:54
- UK 12-inch single
1. "Take Me Over" – 5:08
2. "Take Me Over" (Azari & III Remix) – 6:03
3. "Take Me Over" (Thee Loving Hand Remix) – 10:24

== Charts ==
Chart performance for "Take Me Over"
Chart (2011)	Peak position
Australia Hitseekers (ARIA)	10
Belgium – Dance Singles (Ultratop Wallonia)	49
UK Physical Singles Chart (Official Charts Company)	55
US Dance/Electronic Digital Songs (Billboard)	44

== Release history ==
Release dates and formats for "Take Me Over"
Region	Date	Label	Format(s)
Australia	23 November 2010	Modular	Digital download
United Kingdom	16 January 2011	Modular	Digital download
United Kingdom	24 January 2011	Modular	12"
