= Zonoscope =

2011 studio album by Cut Copy

Studio album by Cut Copy
- Released: 4 February 2011
- Recorded: 2010
- Studios: CCHQ and Christmas St (Melbourne, Victoria); Southern Tracks (Atlanta, Georgia)
- Genres: Synth-pop; indietronica; dance-rock
- Length: 61:25
- Label: Modular
- Producer: Dan Whitford

Cut Copy chronology
In Ghost Colours (2008)	Zonoscope (2011)	Free Your Mind (2013)

Singles from Zonoscope
- 1. "Take Me Over" Released: 26 November 2010; 2. "Need You Now" Released: 25 February 2011; 3. "Blink and You'll Miss a Revolution" Released: 7 August 2011; 4. "Sun God" Released: 24 January 2012

Zonoscope is the third studio album by Australian electronic music band Cut Copy, released on 4 February 2011 by Modular Recordings. Recorded in Melbourne in 2010, the album received generally positive reviews from music critics. Zonoscope reached number three on the ARIA Albums Chart, becoming the band's second highest-peaking album after In Ghost Colours, which topped the chart in 2008.

At the 2011 ARIA Music Awards, Zonoscope won the ARIA Award for Best Dance Release and the Artisan Award for Best Cover Art, and was nominated for Album of the Year. It was also nominated for Best Dance/Electronica Album at the 54th Annual Grammy Awards in 2012.

== Background and recording ==
The album's title and release date were announced exclusively through Spin magazine on 2 November 2010. In an interview with musicOMH, Cut Copy guitarist Tim Hoey said, "I guess we finished touring In Ghost Colours, and we wanted to strip away what we'd done before and re-imagine sonically with different synths and guitars. We also wanted percussion to become more of a feature, because we had this idea of creating a rhythmic, hypnotic record where time becomes irrelevant." He explained that the album's title, Zonoscope, means "a variety of things", adding, "It was an instrument for us, but it's also the lens you would use to view this kind of world. We wanted Zonoscope to represent this record."

Zonoscope was recorded over a six-month period in a warehouse space in Fairfield, Melbourne, littered with discarded vintage recording gear and instruments. "There was no Internet in there, barely any heat, nothing, just fucking industrial Melbourne", Hoey said. "We just knew we could kind of go into there and not feel pressured. We were just kind of locked in there by ourselves, and we couldn't have had it sounding how it sounds without us going in there." In an interview with Pitchfork, Dan Whitford described the album's recording as "a much more open-ended process where we just sort of went off on these more jammy tangents where we'd just sit there and play stuff for 10 minutes and see what happened—we might end up putting out a 10-disc box set of all the weird extended jams we did on this record. There's more of a repetitive, hypnotic, rhythmic aspect to a lot of the tracks."

The band had the idea of using a vocal ensemble while listening to David Bowie's Young Americans (1975) and Primal Scream's Screamadelica (1991). Hoey stated, "[W]hen we started talking to Ben Allen about mixing the record we mentioned that to him and he knew a vocal ensemble in Atlanta that he'd be able to get for us [...] They were amazingly talented singers and they just helped heighten the epic moments on the record which is something we really wanted to try. They also seemed to complement Dan [Whitford]'s voice really well. We didn't necessarily want them to be the focus, just to work in harmony with what Dan was doing and it was amazing to see it work out so well." Regarding the album's influences, Whitford stated, "I was obsessed with Fleetwood Mac's Tusk while working on this record—a lot of the Lindsey Buckingham tracks have a proto-80s African feel. Also Talking Heads, Slave to the Rhythm by Grace Jones, and Malcolm McLaren's Duck Rock album. And a lot of acid house era, post-rave indie music like Happy Mondays and Primal Scream."

The album's artwork uses an image by the late Japanese photomontage artist Tsunehisa Kimura titled Toshi Wa Sawayakana Asa Wo Mukaeru (meaning The City Welcomes a Fresh Morning), which depicts New York City being engulfed in a waterfall. "We saw this representing what the album is about, a tussle between synthetic and organic instruments. It isn't a destruction of the old world, more a creation of the new—it looks archaic, but at the same time it's timeless, referencing music from the past", Hoey said of the artwork.

== Singles ==
"Take Me Over" was released as the lead single from Zonoscope on 26 November 2010. Described by Hoey as "certainly one of the more pop moments from the album", the song reached number 10 on the ARIA Hitseekers chart. A music video for the single was filmed by Kris Moyes in Sydney in November 2010, featuring jungle scenes, an Indiana Jones-style wardrobe and nude models, but it was never released due to production delays. "Need You Now" was released as the album's second single on 25 February 2011, and its accompanying video was directed by Keith Schofield. "Blink and You'll Miss a Revolution" followed as the third single on 7 August 2011. The album's fourth and final single, "Sun God", was released in the United States on 24 January 2012 and in the United Kingdom on 12 February, featuring two remixes by Andrew Weatherall.

=== Promotional singles ===
"Where I'm Going" served as the first taste of the album. Peter Gaston of Spin opined that the song "veer[s] into a more conventional-sounding, guitar-bass-drums combination and seemed to indicate a departure from the sleek, electronic-laced sound of In Ghost Colours." Hoey said of the song, "I knew it might throw people a little bit, but at the end of the day it still sounded like a Cut Copy song [...] It's got a pop music element, which runs throughout every Cut Copy song or album. I thought it was actually great to put out first from the record." The track premiered on Triple J's Tom and Alex breakfast show on 16 July 2010 and was offered as a free download from the band's official website. It was released digitally and as a limited-edition 7-inch vinyl on 20 August 2010. A different version of "Where I'm Going" made the final cut for the album, which Hoey said was "more like the original vision we had for that song: more chant-y, kind of tribal, and probably less pop than the version that came out a couple of months ago."

== Critical reception ==
Professional ratings
Aggregate scores
Source	Rating
AnyDecentMusic?	7.2/10
Metacritic	71/100
Review scores
Source	Rating
AllMusic	4/5 stars
The A.V. Club	A−
Consequence of Sound	4.5/5 stars
The Guardian	3/5 stars
Los Angeles Times	3/4 stars
NME	5/10
Pitchfork	8.6/10
Q	3/5 stars
Rolling Stone	3/5 stars
Spin	8/10

Zonoscope received generally positive reviews from music critics. At Metacritic, which assigns a normalised rating out of 100 to reviews from mainstream publications, the album received an average score of 71, based on 31 reviews. Spencer Kornhaber of The A.V. Club wrote that "Cut Copy's music successfully achieves synesthesia on its own throughout [the album]" and that "each arpeggiator pattern, glow-worm guitar line, and percussive thump on Zonoscope bobs in the mix as a luxuriously distinct spot of sound." Mikael Wood of Spin noted that the album "catches Cut Copy in a pop-attuned mode they've only hinted at in the past" and that it "works best at its most focused and extroverted, as on the disco-glammy 'Where I'm Going' and 'Need You Now'". AllMusic's Tim Sendra stated, "There isn't a single weak track to be found, and though could have easily done so with no side effects, the group didn't just remake Ghost, they made some subtle alterations here and there to their approach." Pitchfork's Tom Breihan commented that throughout the album, "Cut Copy build a long-form piece of work that moves between genres and ideas and moods without ever sacrificing its dancefloor momentum", adding that the band "have the architecture of dance music down perfectly and the confidence to execute the genre's moves with absolute precision." Matthew Cole of Slant Magazine viewed that "Zonoscope shows every sign of being a transitional record, and as such, the most significant test of its merits won't be its ability to generate singles as exhilarating as 'Hearts on Fire,' but rather the possibilities it opens up for the band's future", while stating that the album's music "often sounds self-consciously mature in comparison to the band's previous work".

Margaret Wappler of the Los Angeles Times found that "[t]here aren't too many new stones in the pop garden that Cut Copy overturns, but what it roots out is expertly arranged, creating pastiches that raise ghosts from the past while capturing a spirit that's utterly now." PopMatters reviewer Timothy Gabriele described Zonoscope as "an album that is, in parts, loose and jammy" and called it "a deviation with mostly good ideas, some great ones, and enough sparkling synth ambrosia and sing-along chorus hooks to get you through." The Guardian's Dave Simpson felt that the album is "almost like a mix tape, taking snatches of recognisable songs and blending them together into their own tracks with the aim of creating a greater whole [...] This approach won't win the Aussie electro pranksters awards for originality, but they do it with enough sleight of hand to stay ahead of the lawyers, and it's a lot of fun." Rolling Stone's Jody Rosen observed the influence of bands such as Depeche Mode, OMD and New Order on the album, dubbing it "impressive ventriloquism, and the songs are catchy. But the lovelorn sentiments are generic, and singer Dan Whitford's baritone drone adds little to the proceedings." Rob Webb of NME expressed, "After the ubiquitous presence of '80s-indebted music last year, a follow-up [to In Ghost Colours] with little stylistic deviation isn't a thrilling proposition".

Pitchfork placed the album at number 28 on its list of "The Top 50 Albums of 2011" and concluded, "Above all, Cut Copy showed that they know how to weave new songs from familiar touch-points and that they have the songwriting chops to make the patchwork feel of a piece."

== Commercial performance ==
Zonoscope debuted at number three on the ARIA Albums Chart, becoming the band's second highest-peaking album after In Ghost Colours, which topped the chart in 2008. In the United States, the album debuted at number 46 on the Billboard 200 with 13,000 copies sold in first week.

== Track listing ==
All tracks are written by Cut Copy.

No.	Title	Length
1.	"Need You Now"	6:09
2.	"Take Me Over"	5:50
3.	"Where I'm Going"	3:34
4.	"Pharaohs & Pyramids"	5:28
5.	"Blink and You'll Miss a Revolution"	4:17
6.	"Strange Nostalgia for the Future"	2:06
7.	"This Is All We've Got"	4:43
8.	"Alisa"	4:07
9.	"Hanging Onto Every Heartbeat"	4:37
10.	"Corner of the Sky"	5:29
11.	"Sun God"	15:05

Deluxe edition bonus disc / iTunes Store bonus video
No.	Title	Length
1.	"Artificial Interpreter (The Making of Zonoscope)"	21:07

== Personnel ==
Credits adapted from the liner notes of Zonoscope.

=== Cut Copy ===
- Dan Whitford
- Tim Hoey
- Mitchell Scott
- Ben Browning

=== Additional musicians ===
- Tony Hightower – backing vocals (tracks 1, 2, 5, 9)
- Tanya Smith – backing vocals (tracks 1, 2, 5, 9)
- Natasha Evans – backing vocals (tracks 1, 2, 5, 9)
- Paris Lewis – backing vocals (tracks 1, 2, 5, 9)
- Artia E. Lockett – backing vocals (tracks 1, 2, 5, 9)

=== Technical ===
- Dan Whitford – production
- Mirko Vogel – recording engineering
- Ben Allen – mixing
- Steve Morrison – mix assistance, additional editing, additional engineering
- Rob Gardiner – additional editing, additional engineering
- TJ Elias – second assistant
- CJ Ridings – second assistant
- Juno – studio vibe regulator

=== Artwork ===
- Dan Whitford – sleeve layout, illustration, design
- Alter – sleeve layout, illustration, design
- Tsunehisa Kimura – cover image

== Charts ==
=== Weekly charts ===
Chart (2011)	Peak position
Australian Albums (ARIA)	3
Australian Dance Albums (ARIA)	2
Canadian Albums (Billboard)	33
Irish Albums (IRMA)	65
Swedish Albums (Sverigetopplistan)	48
UK Albums (Official Charts)	82
UK Independent Albums (Official Charts)	8
US Billboard 200	46
US Independent Albums (Billboard)	5
US Top Alternative Albums (Billboard)	6
US Top Rock Albums (Billboard)	10
US Top Dance Albums (Billboard)	2

=== Year-end charts ===
Chart (2011)	Position
Australian Dance Albums (ARIA)	37
US Top Dance/Electronic Albums (Billboard)	19

== Release history ==
Region	Date	Label	Ref.
Australia	4 February 2011	Modular	
Ireland	4 February 2011	Modular	
Germany	7 February 2011	Universal	
United Kingdom	7 February 2011	Modular	
United States	8 February 2011	Modular	
Canada	8 February 2011	Universal	
Sweden	9 February 2011	Universal	
