= Jokers of the Scene =

- Origin: Ottawa, Ontario, Canada
- Genres: Dance; Techno; Electronica
- Years active: 2003 – present
- Labels: Fool's Gold
- Members: Linus Booth; Chris Macintyre

Jokers of the Scene, composed of Linus Booth (also known as DJ Booth), and Chris Macintyre (also known as Chameleonic), are a Canadian Techno/Electronic production and DJ duo.

== History ==
Booth and Macintyre formed Jokers of the Scene in Ottawa, Ontario, in 2003 as loft party disc jockeys; they played their own recorded tracks and remixes, as well as hosting other local rappers.

Jokers of the Scene evolved into a full-time partnership after signing a recording deal with Fool's Gold Records in 2007. They later moved to Toronto, where Spinner Magazine reported on their party organizing and remixing, noting their "early '90s techno-influenced DJing style."

In 2009, the pair's track "Change Up" appeared on the BeatPort chart.

In 2011, Britain's NME Magazine voted their remix of Salem's "Asia" #19 on their "50 Best Remixes Ever" list. In 2012, the pair released an EP, J0T5, which included tracks in a variety of styles. Their 2014 album, End Scene, was a change from their earlier heavy electro music to a more experimental sound.

== Discography ==
=== Albums ===
- End Scene (2014)

=== Extended plays ===
- Y’all Know the Name - EP (2008)
- Acid Bag (2008)
- Baggy Bottom Boys (2009)
- Joking Victim - EP (2010)
- Revolting Joks (2010)
- Killing Jokes - EP (2012)
- J0T5 RMXD - EP (2012)
- J0T5 - EP (2012)
- Endless Scene (2014)

=== Compilations ===
- Scion Sampler, Vol. 22: Fool's Gold Remixed (2008)
- Fool’s Gold Vol. 1 (2010)
