= I Thought of Numbers =

EP by Cut Copy
- Released: 10 September 2001
- Recorded: 2001
- Genre: Electropop
- Length: 31:10
- Label: Modular

Cut Copy chronology
I Thought of Numbers (2001)	Bright Like Neon Love (2004)

I Thought of Numbers is the debut extended play (EP) by Australian electronic music band Cut Copy, released on 10 September 2001 by Modular Recordings.

== Track listing ==
All tracks are written by Dan Whitford

No.	Title	Length
1.	"Glittering Clouds"	5:35
2.	"Rendezvous"	5:18
3.	"Live"	4:48
4.	"Nine Summertime"	3:27
5.	"Drop the Bomb"	4:54
6.	"Standing Up, Sitting Down"	4:12
7.	"Endlessly"	2:56

== Personnel ==
Credits adapted from the liner notes of I Thought of Numbers.

- Dan Whitford – production
- Robbie Chater – assistant engineering
- Bennett Foddy – assistant engineering
- Mike Marsh – mastering
