= Midnight Juggernauts =

Australian band

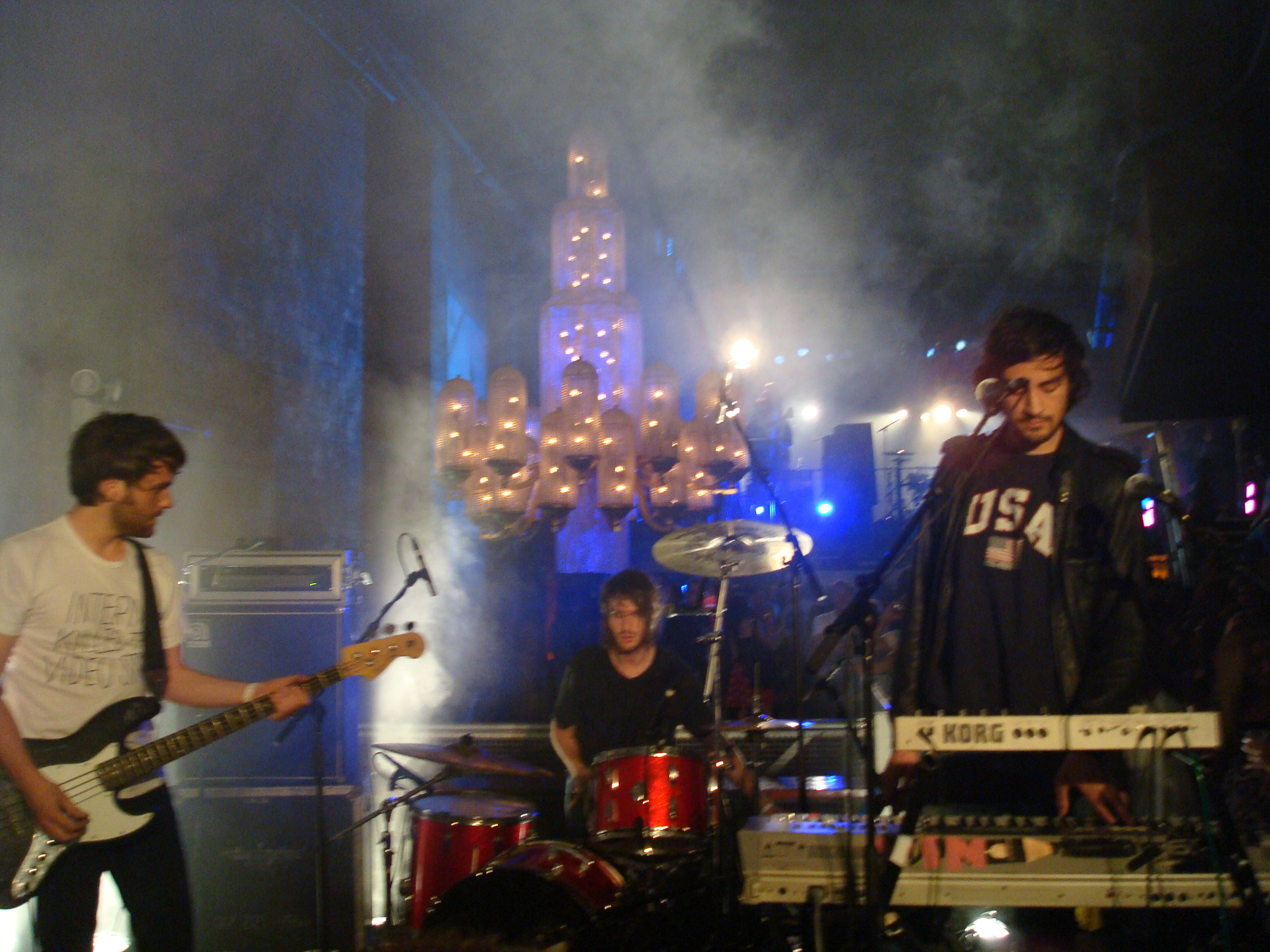
- Midnight Juggernauts performing at MTV's The Lair, Sydney on 4 October 2007

Background information
- Origin: Melbourne, Victoria, Australia
- Genres: Alternative dance; synthpop; electronica
- Years active: 2004–2014
- Labels: Siberia; Capitol; Virgin; Charisma; Astralwerks; EMI; Inertia
- Members: Vincent Vendetta; Andrew Szekeres; Daniel Stricker

Midnight Juggernauts were an Australian electronica band from Melbourne, composed of Andrew Szekeres, Vincent Vendetta (Vincent Heimann) and Daniel Stricker. The band has been described as anything from 'prog dance meets cosmic film scores', to 'slasher-flick disco' to 'deadpan landscape'. Following the release of numerous 7" and 12" singles, and limited edition EPs, the band released their debut album, Dystopia. After playing festivals and headlining tours worldwide during late 2007–2008, the band finished working on their follow up album The Crystal Axis, touring around its release mid-2010 at festivals and headline shows around the globe. After a few years' break, the band released a third album Uncanny Valley in mid-2013. Members have individually collaborated with various artists including Kevin Parker, Justice, Solange Knowles and Sebastian Tellier. The group also runs the label Siberia Records, through which they release their own music and others including Kirin J. Callinan and Forces.

== History ==
=== Origins ===
The band was formed in 2004 by Vincent Vendetta and Andrew Szekeres who met in school. They were later joined by Daniel Stricker in late 2006 who had met the two whilst playing in various groups over the years. The band's influences included M83, Hot Chip, ELO, OMD, Duran Duran and Air.

In early shows the group had many different names and the lyrical content changed from show to show – one time when playing above a Chinese restaurant using the name of items from the menu in the lyrics of a few songs. The band have been noted for their more eccentric approach having come from established creative arts backgrounds, and remain heavily active in various experimental audio-visual projects.

=== EPs and vinyl ===
Following a self-titled EP featuring "Raised By Wolves" in 2005, and the EP Secrets of the Universe in 2006, the band started to quickly gain a following in and out of Australia with the song "Shadows" becoming a hit in clubs and on the Internet. It was originally released as a 12" on friends label Cutters and re-released on Institubes in 2008 along with a host of limited edition vinyl. It and other songs were also featured on many compilations including Modular's Leave Them All Behind, FBI's Kill Your Idols CD, Kitsune Maison, !K7's DJ-Kicks, Cut Copy's FabricLive.29 and a Christmas compilation with Institubes. It was on this Christmas compilation that then French up and coming act Justice (who were also on the compilation) heard the band and declared them their new favourite act, later inviting them to tour with them around the world.

=== Dystopia (2007–2008) ===
In August 2007, the band released their debut album Dystopia in Australia on their own label Siberia Records debuting at #24 on the ARIA Charts. Although not yet released overseas, some of its songs were being played on UK and US radio stations thanks to the many vinyl releases on different independent labels and many compilations, along with support from other artists. Because it was not yet released, the band's music such as "Shadows" was being played on BBC Radio 1, as "Tomorrow Today" on Modular Records which was incorrect. It also received reviews not only in Australia but in the US and UK (before its release) as well stating Dystopia was a "euphoric hammering together of Krautrock grooves, psychedelic flights of melodic fancy and post-Justice grindy synth noises", and being declared album of the year in 2007 by Pedro Winter in XLR8R magazine

At this time the band decided to do a license deal with EMI Records for their label Siberia Records.

In October 2007, the band were invited to tour with Justice around North America, leaving their mark on the CMJ Festival playing with !!!, Holy Fuck and Klaxons across the UK and Europe. They then returned to Australia where they played the main stage of the Big Day Out festival alongside acts such as Rage Against the Machine, Björk and Arcade Fire.

2008 began with the band inviting M83 to tour with them on a league of sold-out shows in Australia. It then saw the band release Dystopia with additional material in April and May internationally. To support the release of the album the band toured the world performing on their own headlining tours and many festivals including Coachella, Fuji Rock, Glastonbury, Primavera Sound, Latitude, Bestival, Route du Rock, Electric Picnic, Lowlands, Pukkelpop, Lovebox, Summercase, Alive, Montreux Jazz Festival, Eurockeenes, Hove and Rockness.

=== The Crystal Axis (2008–2011) ===
After Dystopia the band located to a beach house on the east coast of Australia to work on new music, having collected a lot of ideas while touring for the previous 2 years. After experimenting with a range of analogue gear and new digital sounds, a fresh batch of songs were written with a more 'prog' / 'layered' sound – working with a lot of ambient layers. The band then entered a range of studio's with engineer Chris Moore (TV on the radio, yeah yeah yeah's, yeasayer), and started tracking the new record .

Fresh out of the studio, they were then asked to perform at a range of festivals in Buenos Aires and Australia (Splendour in the Grass) and also a tour supporting the Flaming Lips, road-testing new material including early versions of 'Vital Signs' (then called United Illuminations), and 'This New Technology' – allowing the songs to further develop. As a preview to the new album, the band released the This New Technology EP, and an accompanying 500 copy 7" through Acephale Records, featuring the single This New Technology, a radio edit and remixes by The Emperor Machine, Memory Tapes, Juan Maclean and Babe Rainbow, also performing in New York at the CMJ music festival. Returning home, the band (who were self-producing their new album) went back into the studio to finish mixing the rest of the record.

2010 started out with performances at the Falls, Big Day Out and Golden Plains festivals. The band then created 'The Crystal Axis' (not only the name of the album but a physical construct / a world surrounding the album) which they built (using all the synthesisers and instruments from the recording) with the help of Melbourne artist Dylan Martorell and lights from MPH. They also created a video around this construct, an idea from the band executed with the help of Krozm.

Just prior to the release of The Crystal Axis the band played a handful of sold-out shows previewing the new record in Paris, London, Amsterdam, Zurich, Edinburgh, Santiago, Brazil and more. The Crystal Axis was then released on 28 May 2010 in Australia with international dates following between July (UK) and September (August in the US, with a 12" double vinyl on Acephale/Siberia Records and September in Europe).

The Crystal Axis won 'Best Independent Dance/Electronica Album' at the fifth annual Australian Independent Record (AIR) Awards. They received their second award in this category, after winning in 2007.

The rest of 2010 was filled with European and Australian festival dates such as Calvi on the Rocks, Montreux Jazz Festival, Exit Festival, Lovebox, Benicassim, Splendour in the Grass, and Parklife.

=== Uncanny Valley and Aerials (2013–2014) ===
The band took a few years' break where they returned to focus on various experimental audio-visual projects. Eventually they started writing/recording sessions in a converted church in France's Loire Valley. They then released a music video anonymously, hidden under the guise of a Soviet pop band from the early '80s. This Russian-shot video remained unattributed and hidden behind this pretense for many weeks. It was eventually announced as a new Midnight Juggernauts track, Ballad of the War Machine. Their third album Uncanny Valley was released soon after in mid-2013 and the band toured with Tame Impala to promote it.

A year later in 2014, the band released a 4-track EP of new songs named Aerials via Bandcamp. All proceeds from EP sales were pledged towards the Aboriginal Benefits Foundation. A shorter 2-track version was also offered as an iTunes single.

=== Current hiatus and other projects ===
Midnight Juggernauts became inactive shortly after Aerials and have not released new music or played any concerts since 2014. No statements or clarifications on the band's activity have been released, but the members have remained active individually.

Daniel Stricker turned to music production for other artists, including albums for Kirin J. Callinan and Dita Von Teese. He released his first solo album Morphin under the pseudonym DANIAL in 2020. Stricker and Vincent Vendetta also collaborated on the virtual reality art projects Shifting Homes and Mirrar World in 2021. In 2023, Stricker formed a new band with collaborator Byron Spencer, known as DeepFaith.

Andrew Szekeres began releasing solo music under the pseudonym Turkish Prison in 2014. In 2019, he collaborated with Tim Hoey of Cut Copy on an electronic music project known as Sanctuary Lakes, which was released as a self-titled album that year. Szekeres also played on, wrote for and assisted with production of the Avalanches' 2020 album, We Will Always Love You.

== Discography ==
=== Albums ===
List of studio albums, with selected chart positions
| Title | Album details | Peak chart positions |
| Title | Album details | AUS |
|---|---|---|
| Dystopia | Released: 4 August 2007; Label: Siberia/Inertia (SIB002); Formats: CD, digital download | 21 |
| The Crystal Axis | Released: 28 May 2010; Label: Siberia (SIB003); Formats: CD, LP, digital download | 20 |
| Uncanny Valley | Released: 14 June 2013; Label: Record Makers (SIB006CD); Formats: CD, LP, digital download | — |

=== EPs ===
| Title | EP details |
|---|---|
| Midnight Juggernauts | Released: 2004; Label: Reverberation (REV014); Formats: CD, DD |
| Secrets of the Universe | Released: June 2006; Label: Siberia/Inertia (SIB001); Formats: CD, DD |
| Live & Uncut | Released: 2007; Label: Siberia; Formats: DD |
| Aerials | Released: 2014; Label: Siberia; Formats: DD |

== Awards and nominations ==
=== AIR Awards ===
The Australian Independent Record Awards (commonly known informally as AIR Awards) is an annual awards night to recognise, promote and celebrate the success of Australia's Independent Music sector.

| Year | Nominee / work | Award | Result |
|---|---|---|---|
| 2007 | Dystopia | Best Independent Dance/Electronic Album | Won |
| 2010 | The Crystal Axis | Best Independent Dance/Electronic Album | Won |
| 2010 | themselves | Most Popular Independent Artist | Nominated |

=== ARIA Music Awards ===
The ARIA Music Awards is an annual awards ceremony that recognises excellence, innovation, and achievement across all genres of Australian music. They commenced in 1987.

| Year | Nominee / work | Award | Result | Ref. |
|---|---|---|---|---|
| 2008 | Dystopia | Breakthrough Artist - Album | Nominated | |
| 2008 | Dystopia | Best Independent Release | Nominated | |
| 2010 | "The Crystal Axis" | Best Dance Release | Nominated | |

=== Australian Music Prize ===
The Australian Music Prize (the AMP) is an annual award of $30,000 given to an Australian band or solo artist in recognition of the merit of an album released during the year of award. The commenced in 2005.

| Year | Nominee / work | Award | Result |
|---|---|---|---|
| 2007 | Dystopia | Australian Music Prize | Nominated |

=== J Award ===
The J Awards are an annual series of Australian music awards that were established by the Australian Broadcasting Corporation's youth-focused radio station Triple J. They commenced in 2005.

| Year | Nominee / work | Award | Result |
|---|---|---|---|
| 2007 | Dystopia | Australian Album of the Year | Nominated |
| 2010 | "Lara Versus the Savage Pack" | Australian Video of the Year | Nominated |
