= Bright Like Neon Love =

Studio album by Cut Copy
- Released: 5 April 2004
- Studio: The Soft Centre (Melbourne); Capitol (Paris) (Note: Additional recording)
- Genre: Synth-pop; electropop; dance-rock
- Length: 41:52
- Label: Modular
- Producer: Dan Whitford

Cut Copy chronology
I Thought of Numbers (2001)	Bright Like Neon Love (2004)	In Ghost Colours (2008)

Singles from Bright Like Neon Love
- 1. "Future" Released: 4 May 2004; 2. "Saturdays" Released: 15 August 2004; 3. "Going Nowhere" Released: 18 January 2006

Bright Like Neon Love is the debut studio album by Australian electronic music band Cut Copy, released by Modular Recordings in Australia on 5 April 2004 and in the United States on 18 May 2004. The album was released on vinyl for the first time on 20 April 2013 for Record Store Day, in a limited run of 4000 copies.

== Critical reception ==
Professional ratings
Aggregate scores
Source	Rating
Metacritic	81/100
Review scores
Source	Rating
AllMusic	4/5 stars
Alternative Press	3.5/5 stars
Drowned in Sound	9/10
The Guardian	4/5 stars
The Irish Times	3/5 stars
NME	8/10
Spin	A−
Stylus	B+
Uncut	3/5 stars

Bright Like Neon Love received widespread acclaim from critics. At Metacritic, which assigns a normalised rating out of 100 to reviews from mainstream publications, the album received an average score of 81, based on nine reviews. NME compared the album to "Technique-era New Order fed through My Bloody Valentine's distortion pedals" and described it as "the album Daft Punk should have made". In his highly positive review for Drowned in Sound, Euan McLean described the album as "the record The Human League could have made if they'd remade Fleetwood Mac's Rumours in 1985" and commended the band for "mixing emotion and technology to perfection".

== Controversy ==
The cover art of Bright Like Neon Love was closely imitated by the art for Mexican singer Thalía's album Lunada (2008). Both shared the concept of a face in close-up, wearing sunglasses and bright lipstick. Following criticism by the fans and media, Thalía claimed that the artwork had been presented to her by the design team for her label.

== Track listing ==
All tracks are written by Dan Whitford.

No.	Title	Length
1.	"Time Stands Still"	4:34
2.	"Future"	5:12
3.	"Saturdays"	3:38
4.	"Saturdays (Reprise)"	1:39
5.	"Going Nowhere"	3:41
6.	"DD-5"	0:26
7.	"That Was Just a Dream"	2:34
8.	"Zap Zap"	2:42
9.	"The Twilight"	5:25
10.	"Autobahn Music Box"	4:31
11.	"Bright Neon Payphone"	3:52
12.	"A Dream"	3:45

== Personnel ==
Credits adapted from the liner notes of Bright Like Neon Love.

=== Cut Copy ===
- Dan Whitford – synths, drum machine, guitars, vocals, bass
- Tim Hoey – original guitars, bass, noise
- Bennett Foddy – original bass
- Mitchell Scott – live drums

=== Additional musicians ===
- Dougal Binns – original acoustic guitar (track 10)
- Philippe Zdar, Frédo Nlandu, Julien Delfaud, Alex – claps

=== Technical ===
- Chris Scallan – full band recording
- Philippe Zdar – mixing (tracks 1, 2, 11)
- Jeff Dominguez – mixing (tracks 3–5)
- Julien Delfaud – mixing (tracks 7–10, 12)
- Frédo Nlandu – mixing assistance
- Pierrick Devin – mixing assistance
- Mike Marsh – mastering
- Dan Whitford – production

=== Artwork ===
- Alter – artwork, design

== Charts ==
Chart (2004)	Peak position
Australian Dance Albums (ARIA)	10
Australian Hitseekers Albums (ARIA)	19
