= Kate Bollinger =

American folk musician

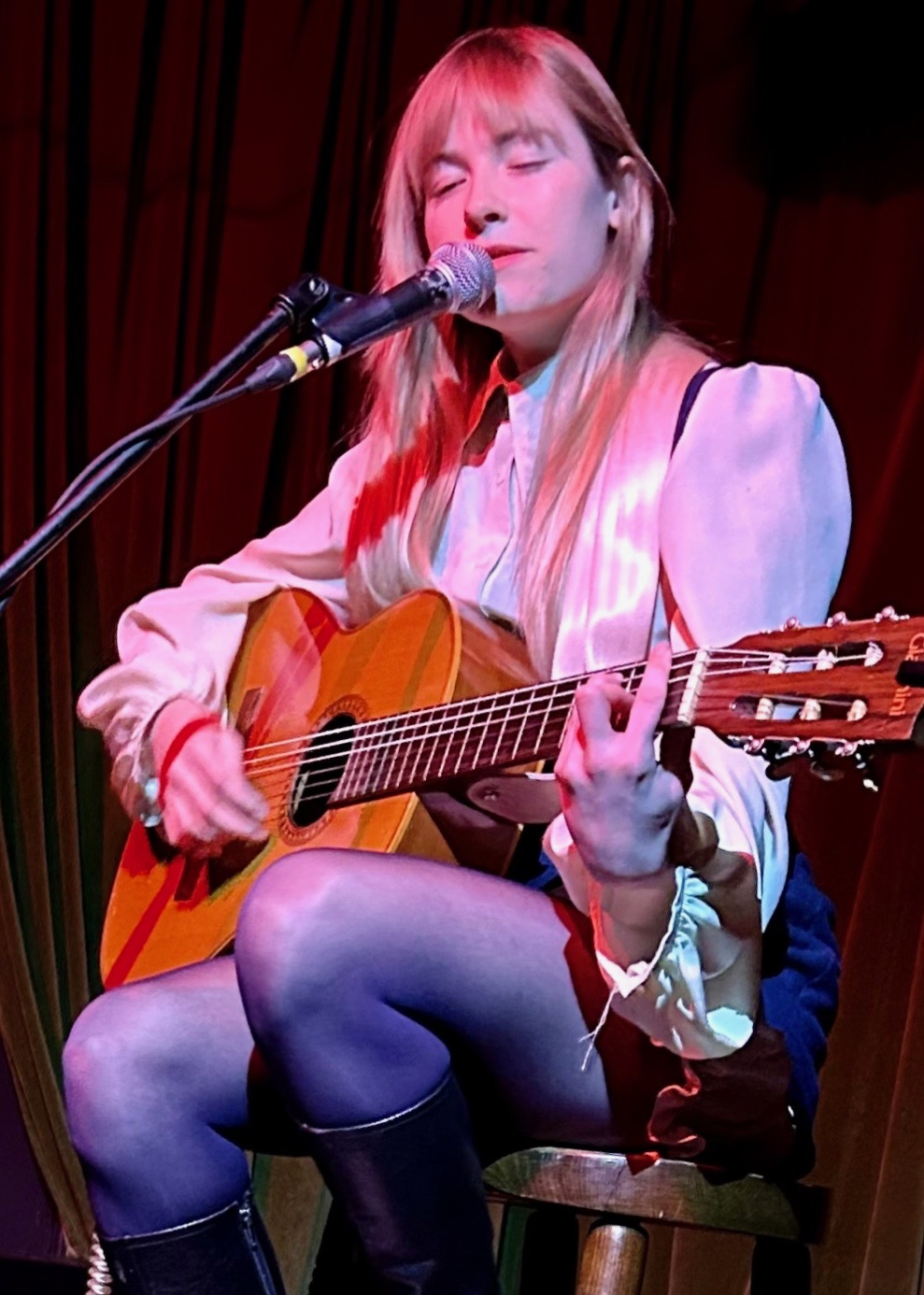
- Bollinger performing at Gullivers in Manchester, England, 2023

Background information
- Born: Catherine Bollinger; 1997 or 1998 (age 28–29); Charlottesville, Virginia, U.S.
- Genres: Indie pop; folk
- Occupation: Singer-songwriter
- Instruments: Vocals; guitar
- Years active: 2017–present
- Label: Ghostly International
- Website: katebollinger.com

Kate Bollinger is an American folk singer-songwriter from Charlottesville, Virginia.

== History ==
Bollinger was introduced to music at a young age, as her mother was a music therapist and her two brothers were musicians.

Bollinger began making home recordings early in high school. She self-released her first extended play (EP) in 2017 titled Key West. In 2019, she released her EP I Don't Wanna Lose, which was recorded in one day, with very little production or mastering, using some free studio time she had acquired. "Candy", the second track of the EP, was inspiration for Kanye West's 2021 song "Donda". In 2020, Bollinger graduated from the University of Virginia—where she studied poetry and cinematography—and released her second EP, A Word Becomes a Sound.

She released the EP Look at It in the Light in 2022 through Ghostly International.

Bollinger's work has been highlighted several times at The Line of Best Fit, and she has performed for NPR's World Cafe.

On September 27, 2024, Bollinger released her debut studio album Songs from a Thousand Frames of Mind.

In September 2025 Bollinger was featured on the single "Belong to You" by Australian synth-pop group Cut Copy.

== Discography ==
EPs

- Key West (2017)
- I Don't Wanna Lose (2019)
- A Word Becomes a Sound (2020)
- Look at It in the Light (2022)
- Shop Girl (2026)

Studio albums

- Songs from a Thousand Frames of Mind (2024)
