= Cut Copy =

Australian synth-pop band

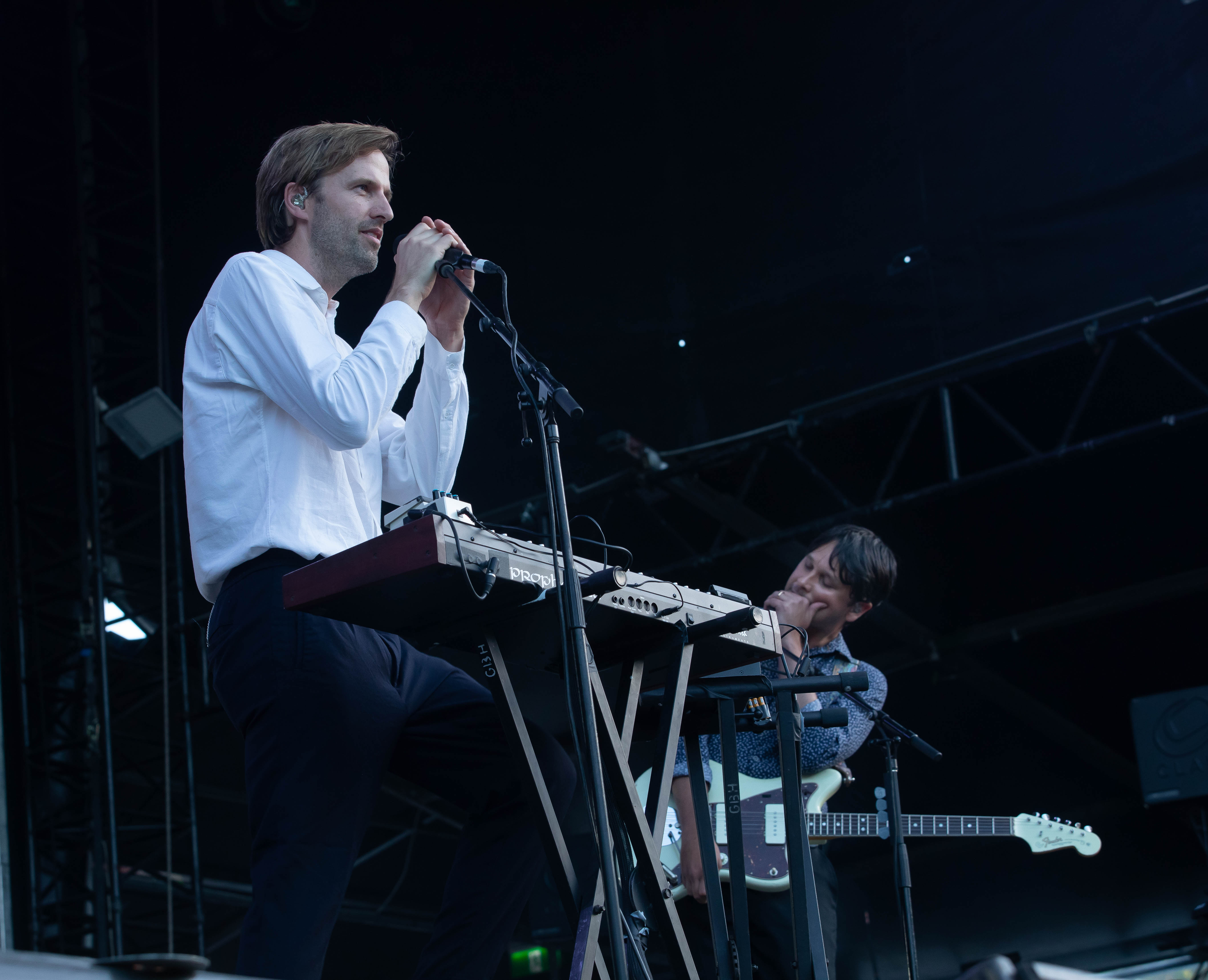
- Cut Copy performing at Falls Festival in Byron Bay, 2018

Background information
- Origin: Melbourne, Victoria, Australia
- Genres: Synth-pop; indietronica; dance-punk; new wave
- Years active: 2001–present
- Labels: Modular; Island
- Spinoffs: Hypernatural
- Members: Dan Whitford; Tim Hoey; Mitchell Scott; Ben Browning
- Past members: Bennett Foddy
- Website: cutcopy.net

Cut Copy (sometimes stylised as Cut/Copy) are an Australian synth-pop band formed in 2001 by Dan Whitford (vocals, keyboards and guitar). Originally a home-recording project, the band now includes Tim Hoey (guitars), Ben Browning (bass guitar), and Mitchell Scott (drums).

The band achieved breakthrough success in 2008 with their second album, In Ghost Colours, which included well-known singles "Lights & Music" and "Hearts on Fire".

== History ==
=== Formation ===
Cut Copy was established in 2001 in Melbourne, Australia as the solo project of Dan Whitford, a DJ and graphic designer. Whitford was educated at Scotch College and studied graphic design at Monash University. During his studies he became interested in dance music and began DJing while hosting a radio show. Around this time he bought a sampler and keyboards to experiment with. Musically he was "inspired by indie low-fi stuff as much as dance". Upon graduating Whitford co-founded the design agency Alter, who continue to produce all of the graphical material for the band.

According to Whitford, the band's name was a random choice: "I was in the edit menu [of my computer] and I moved down in the document to the few words that didn't make sense together, and at that particular day and time the words 'cut' and 'copy' really stood out to me. At the time it felt like a fairly abstract choice but now it feels very tied in with what we do". The name is often displayed as one word with a forward slash in between: Cut/Copy.

Whitford began producing music at his home-studio and submitted a demo-tape to Modular Recordings, who subsequently signed him sometime in the first half of 2001. He enlisted the help of veteran guitarist Harry Howard to record the debut single "1981", which was released on vinyl only. With Howard filling in on guitar, Whitford asked his childhood friend Bennett Foddy to join on bass with the view to release an EP. The band was assisted by Robbie Chater of The Avalanches who produced the seven largely instrumental tracks that were leaning heavily on samples. I Thought of Numbers was released in September 2001 and spurred a number of remixes on vinyl. The following year saw Whitford remould the band with a view to take to the stage. Their live debut was at the 2003 Livid festival where they performed in front of 5,000 people.

In 2003, Howard was replaced by Tim Hoey, a student at the Victoria College of Art after he and Whitford began exchanging demo tapes. Drummer Mitchell Scott joined shortly after, explaining that "we were just in the same circle of friends, and Tim was sort of roped in because he could play guitar and Dan's sampler had actually broken down, which kind of brought on the need to find a new way of thinking about a live show". Prior to Hoey and Scott joining, a Cut Copy performance was essentially Whitford together with Joel McKenzie doing a DJ set that included sampling their own material. Throughout their career, the band has continued to do DJ sets and remixes for others. AllMusic lists Daft Punk, New Order, the Human League, Electric Light Orchestra, Erasure, Orchestral Manoeuvres in the Dark and Pet Shop Boys among their influences.

=== 2003–2006: Bright Like Neon Love ===
Whitford began working on the band's debut album in early 2003 and had written half a dozen songs when during a DJ gig, one of their samplers broke down. Together with Hoey, Scott and Foddy he began reinterpreting the material. Later in the year, Whitford gathered all the recordings and travelled to Paris to mix the album with Phillippe Zdar and his team, and found that he had "two different versions of the recordings, so I started taking parts from both of those, and putting them together". In April 2004, Cut Copy released their debut LP Bright Like Neon Love to moderate success, supported by the singles "Future" and "Saturdays". The four-piece began rehearsing for a tour and began to play 'a garage band version' of the material. At this stage Foddy left the group to study for his PhD, and the band continued as a three-piece.

In 2005, the trio toured internationally for the first time, as support to international acts such as Franz Ferdinand, The Presets, Junior Senior, Bloc Party and Mylo while also playing a number of European festivals. By playing a large number of shows their fan-base grew and three members became more proficient in their instruments. In contrast to previous occasions, Whitford began songwriting with the others in the band. In the first half of 2006, Whitford was asked to produce a mix for the Fabric label, which included a number of Cut Copy mixes. It was released in August 2006 as FabricLive.29 and described as "collection of indie, hip-hop, electroclash and straight up rock". He did the same for the American clothing company Triple 5 Soul in the same year, which Modular later released as a podcast.

=== 2007–2009: In Ghost Colours ===
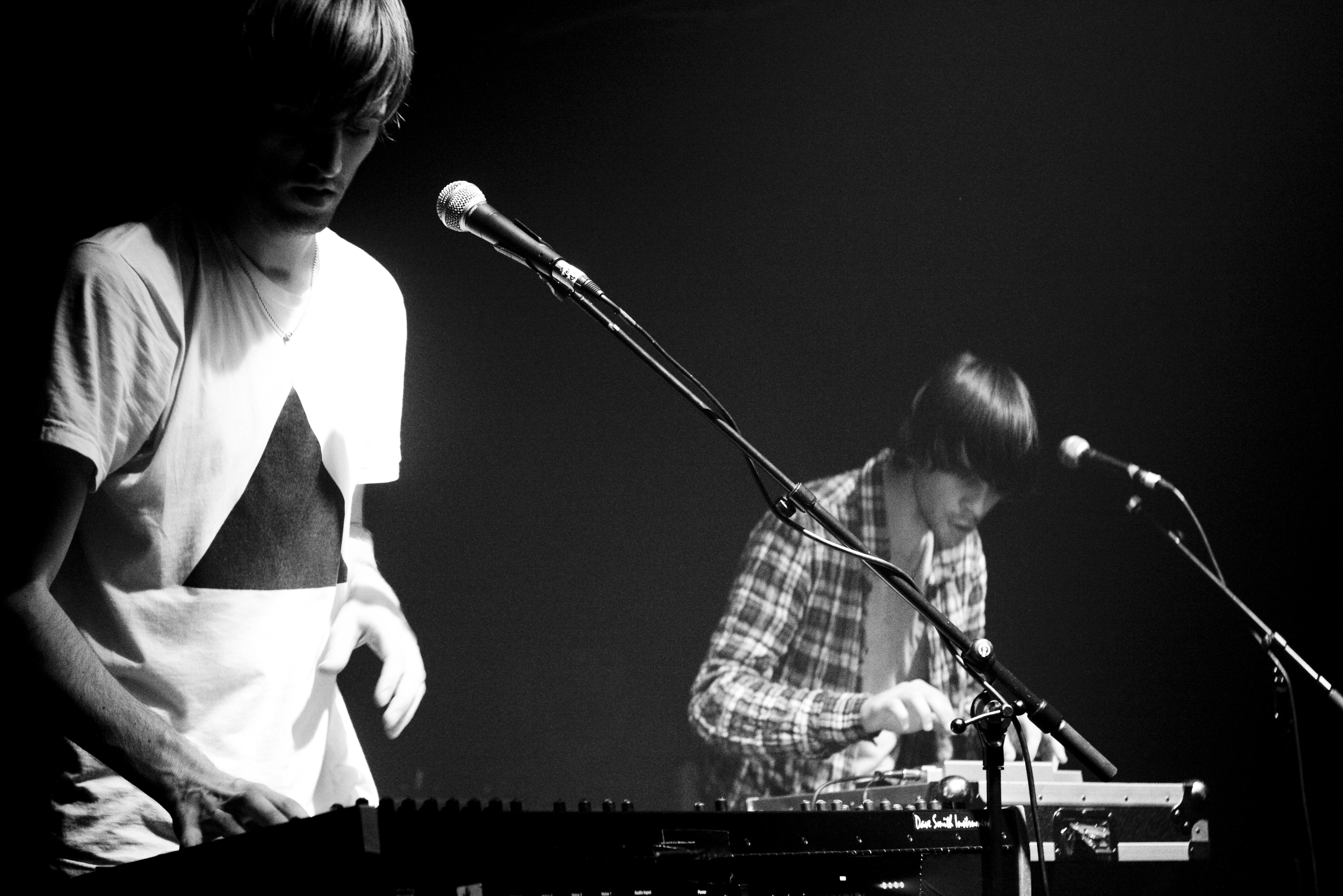
Cut Copy performing at Point Éphémère in Paris, 2008

For much of 2006, Whitford had been working on the second album using the three-piece template that had been touring the world. Towards the end of September, he had much of the album complete in demo form. These recordings were sent to Tim Goldsworthy who agreed to produce the new record. In early 2007 the band travelled to New York where the new album was completed in a six-week period. Whitford commented on Goldsworthy's contribution that "he was almost like an extra member of the band and gave us feedback on things that were working and things that he thought we could change. On top of that he has an incredible wealth of experience with what he's done with other records and brought some of those recording techniques to our music". After some mixing in Los Angeles, the album was finalised at the band's homebase in Melbourne.

In May 2007, the band decided to play a small Australian tour while Modular Recordings released the single "Hearts on Fire" digitally and on vinyl. In September, the band had announced the completion of their second album, In Ghost Colours, but its Australian release was delayed until 22 March 2008 to co-ordinate with its international release. The rest of the year was spent doing remixes and playing a number of local festivals. In December 2007, the group toured Australia with Daft Punk on the Nevereverland tour, and the Sydney leg of which attracted a crowd of almost 50,000 people. The promo-only single "So Haunted" was made available for airplay while Whitford was putting together another compilation of mixes.

As a prelude to their second album, the band released the So Cosmic mix in February 2008, showing the disco/new wave inspiration behind In Ghost Colours. The album debuted on the ARIA Albums Chart at number one and was also a minor chart success in the UK and the US. Cut Copy's next single, "Lights & Music" was used in video game FIFA 09. It reached the top 10 in the Australian dance chart and became their most popular song. "Far Away", album's third and final single, was played on Nip/Tuck, a United States TV series, on one of its final episodes, in a club scene.

=== 2010–2012: Zonoscope ===
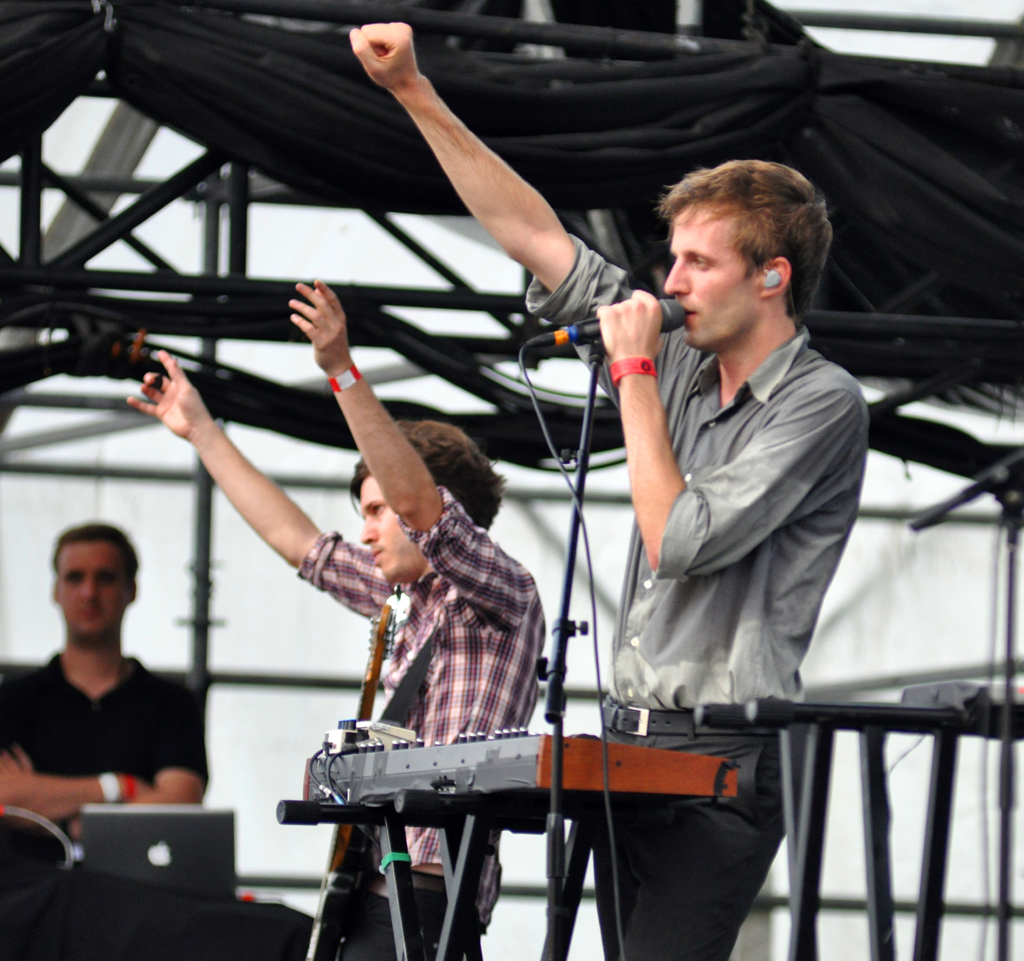
Cut Copy performing in Williamsburg, Brooklyn, August 2010

In July 2010, radio station Triple J broadcast the teaser track "Where I'm Going" ahead of Cut Copy's third album, Zonoscope, which drew inspirations from the early 1980s. It was largely recorded in a Melbourne warehouse with only the band and an engineer working on it. The band confirmed that they had officially become a four-piece with the addition of bass guitarist Ben Browning. "Where I'm Going" became the theme song of RIM's BlackBerry PlayBook's sneak-preview video, which was released in September 2010.

The band premiered the new single "Take Me Over" in November 2010 on Triple J's breakfast show with Tom & Alex. In an interview with The Music Network, guitarist Tim Hoey described it as "certainly one of the more pop moments on the album." Zonoscope peaked at number three in Australia in February 2011 and was a considerable success internationally. In March 2011, the group performed on the Saturday of the Ultra Music Festival in Miami, US. In June, they played at the Indie Fest in Puerto Rico and two dates in Tel Aviv. In July, the band performed to an audience of 25,000 people at the Camp Bisco festival in Mariaville Lake, New York, and in September played the Virgin Mobile FreeFest in Columbia, Maryland, US. Zonoscope was supported by further singles "Need You Now" and "Blink and You'll Miss a Revolution" in 2011.

In March 2012, bassist Ben Browning released his debut solo EP Lover Motion on Cut Copy's Cutters Records imprint. It was preceded by the single "I Can't Stay".

=== 2013–2015: Free Your Mind ===
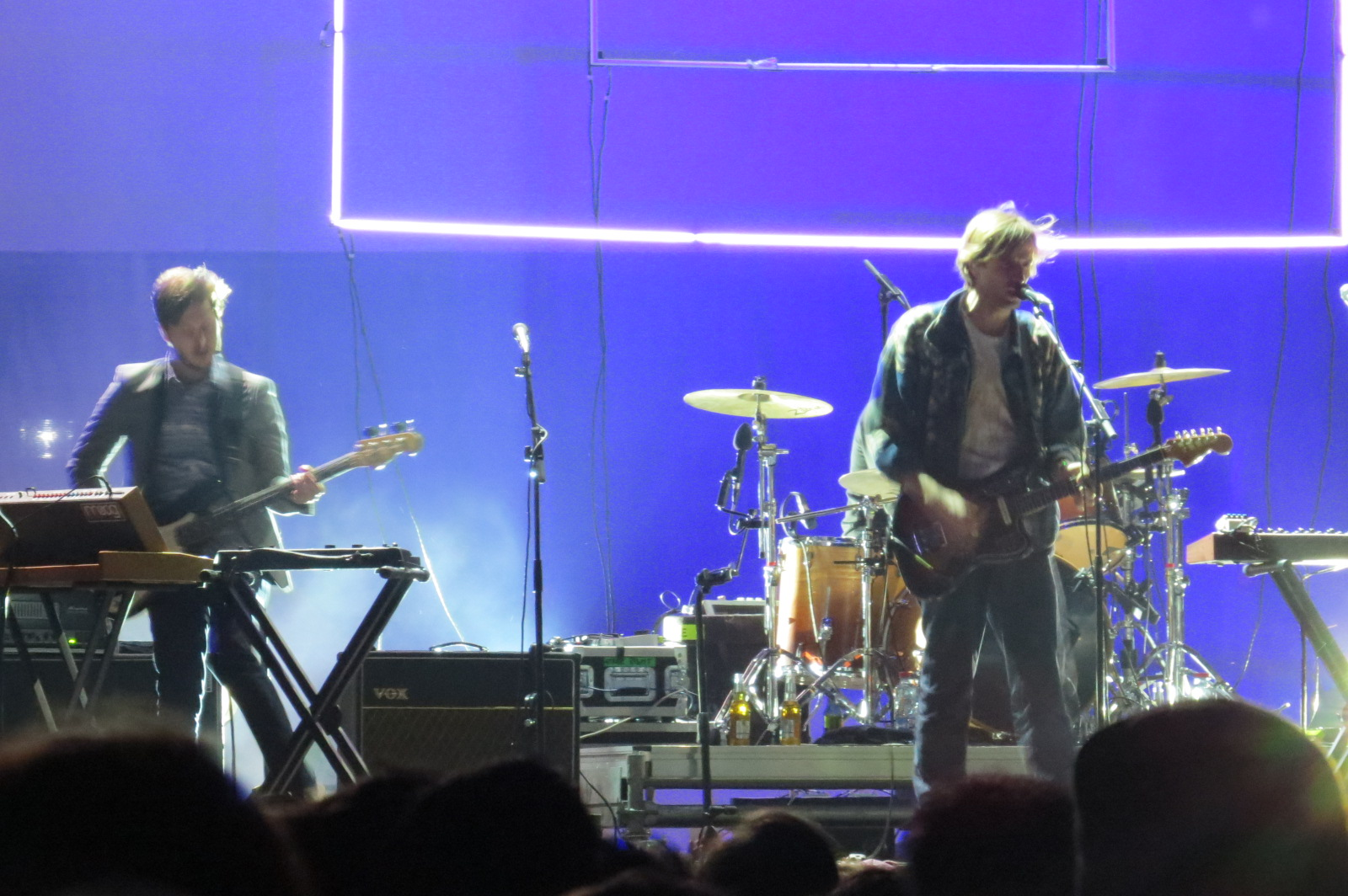
Cut Copy performing at the Fauna Primavera festival in Chile, 2013

In early September 2013, the full version of the title track to their fourth album Free Your Mind debuted at six specific locations worldwide. Fans were informed that they could visit selected billboards in Mexico, Chile, Australia, two locations in the US (Detroit, and California) and one in the UK at Blaneau Gwent in South Wales. When fans were standing near the billboard, they could open an app which would allow them to stream the track through their smartphones. The track quickly appeared on Triple J's hitlist getting regular airplay. The music video for "Free Your Mind", directed by Christopher Hill and released in October 2013, stars Swedish actor Alexander Skarsgård as a cult leader.

The album Free Your Mind was released on 1 November 2013, reaching the top 20 in Australia, but meeting with minor success in the UK and US charts. After rehearsals in Nashville, Cut Copy embarked on a world tour of North and South America through to Europe and Russia. The music video for "We Are Explorers" premiered in February 2014, followed by the release of the vinyl single "In These Arms of Love" for Record Store Day. The latter was later included in the deluxe re-release of Free Your Mind. In November, the band released a well-received mix album Oceans Apart.

The band spent most of the 2015 working on the follow-up to Free Your Mind. Another mix album, Forest Through the Trees, was released in June and was followed by a DJ tour.

=== 2016–2019: Haiku from Zero ===
In September 2016, the band released January Tape, a 44-minute ambient instrumental piece available as a limited cassette run of 400 copies. According to Dan Whitford, the new album was about three-quarters complete as of October 2016.

In July 2017, "Airborne" was released as the lead single from the new album. Next month, the band announced that the record would be called Haiku from Zero and simultaneously released the second single, "Standing in the Middle of the Field". The album was released on 22 September 2017 to mostly positive reviews. Despite this, it turned out Cut Copy's least commercially successful album since their debut Bright Like Neon Love, peaking outside the top 50 in Australia and failing to enter general charts elsewhere. The band embarked on a tour to promote the new album, performing in North America, Australia, New Zealand, South America and Japan from 2017 to 2018.

In November 2018, they released a new single, "Ocean Blue", which was recorded during Haiku from Zero sessions. In 2019, Cut Copy played a series of concerts in Europe.

=== 2020–2023: Freeze, Melt and Collected Works 2001/2011 ===
On 8 May 2020, Cut Copy released a track, "Love Is All We Share", that was written about a year earlier. On 26 June 2020, the band announced their sixth full-length album, Freeze, Melt, which was released on 21 August. The same day they released the lead song to the album, called "Cold Water". Freeze, Melt was produced by bandleader Dan Whitford and mixed by Christoffer Berg known for his work with The Knife and Fever Ray at Svenska Grammofon Studion in Gothenburg, Sweden. Berg utilized a Neve Electronics console used by Brian Eno, David Bowie, Queen and The Rolling Stones.

On 14 January 2022, Dan Whitford, Mike Gamwell (of Knightlife), and Mirko Vogel released an ambient/techno eponymous album under the group name Hypernatural. Later in 2022, Cut Copy released a vinyl box set Collected Works 2001–2011 chronicling their first decade. The set was limited to 2,000 copies worldwide and the first 1,000 sold out within 8 hours. It contained their first 3 albums which were out-of-print on vinyl for years, the band's first 2 EPs which were previously unavailable on vinyl and only available through this set, and a 72-page zine curated by Cut Copy's Dan Whitford. From 2022 to 2023, Cut Copy toured North and South America, Australia, and Europe in support of Freeze, Melt.

=== 2024–present: Moments ===
In June 2025, the group announced the forthcoming release of their seventh album, Moments. The album was preceded by four singles, the final one being "Belong to You", featuring American folk musician Kate Bollinger. Moments received mixed-to-positive reviews. Commercially, it was one of their least successful, failing to enter general albums chart in any country, but it did reach number 1 on the Australian dance chart. To support the album, Cut Copy toured Australia, the US and Mexico in autumn 2025.

== Members ==
=== Current members ===
- Dan Whitford – vocals, keyboard, guitar (2001–present)
- Tim Hoey – guitar, samplers, percussion (2003–present)
- Mitchell Scott – drums (2003–present)
- Ben Browning – bass guitar (2010–present)

=== Former members ===
- Bennett Foddy – bass, synth (2001–04)

== Discography ==
- Bright Like Neon Love (2004)
- In Ghost Colours (2008)
- Zonoscope (2011)
- Free Your Mind (2013)
- Haiku from Zero (2017)
- Freeze, Melt (2020)
- Moments (2025)

== Awards ==
Award nominations for Cut Copy
| Year | Ceremony | Category | Work | Result |
|---|---|---|---|---|
| 2004 | ARIA Music Awards | Best Dance Release | "Future" | Nominated |
| 2008 | ARIA Music Awards | Best Dance Release | In Ghost Colours | Nominated |
| 2008 | J Award | Album of the Year | In Ghost Colours | Nominated |
| 2011 | ARIA Awards | Album of the Year | Zonoscope | Nominated |
| 2011 | ARIA Awards | Best Dance Release | Zonoscope | Won |
| 2011 | ARIA Awards | Best Cover Art | Zonoscope | Won |
| 2012 | Grammy Award | Best Dance/Electronica Album | Zonoscope | Nominated |
