= Tim Goldsworthy =

British record producer, DJ and artist

Tim Goldsworthy is a British record producer, DJ and recording artist.

== Career ==
Originally a musician/producer for Unkle with James Lavelle, he later worked with James Murphy of LCD Soundsystem and was formerly joint owner of DFA Records. Goldsworthy was sued in March 2013 by Murphy and DFA Records for "breach of contract" and "unjust enrichment". Goldsworthy's friendship with Murphy is rumoured to be the subject of the song "How Do You Sleep?" from LCD Soundsystem's album American Dream.

Originally working in the electronic genre, he has produced for dance-punk bands like The Rapture, Hercules & Love Affair and Cut Copy. He also produced David Holmes' Let's Get Killed and remixed artists such as Radio 4, Prints, Maserati and Home Video under the name The Loving Hand (or Thee Loving Hand).

He collaborated with Massive Attack on the album Heligoland, released on Virgin Records in February 2010.

Goldsworthy produced Alexis Taylor's 2018 solo album, Beautiful Thing.
