= Factory Girl =

Factory Girl or Factory Girls may refer to:

== Film ==
- Factory Girl (2006 film), an American film
- Factory Girl (2013 film), an Egyptian film
- The Match Factory Girl, a Finnish–Swedish film

== Music ==
- Factory Girls (album), a 2006 album by Dallas Crane
- "Factory Girl" (Rolling Stones song), a song by The Rolling Stones
- "Factory Girl" (folk song), a traditional Irish song
- "Factory Girl", a song by Ralph McTell on his 1969 album My Side of Your Window, later covered by Marie Little
- "Factory Girl", a song by The Pretty Reckless on their album Light Me Up
- "Factory Girl", a song by Xiu Xiu on their album Always
- "Factory Girls", a song by Flogging Molly on their album Within a Mile of Home

== Other uses ==
- Factory Girl (Rails Testing), a testing framework for Ruby on Rails
- The Factory Girls, a Frank McGuinness play
- Factory Girls a 2008 book by Leslie Chang
- Factory Girls a 2023 book by Michelle Gallen
- Factory Girl (TV series), a South Korean TV series

== See also ==
- Rosie the Riveter
