= 2008 ARIA Music Awards =

Annual Australian music awards ceremony

- Date: 19 October 2008
- Venue: Acer Arena, Sydney, New South Wales

Highlights
- Most wins: Gabriella Cilmi (6); The Presets (6)
- Most nominations: The Presets (8)
- Website: ariaawards.com.au

Television/radio coverage
- Network: Network Ten

The 22nd annual Australian Recording Industry Association Music Awards (generally known as the ARIA Music Awards or simply the ARIAs) took place on 19 October 2008. The nominees for all categories were announced on 10 September, while the winners of the Artisan Awards were announced on the same day.

== Awards and nominations ==
Final nominees are shown in plain, with winners in bold.

=== ARIA Awards ===
Album of the Year

- **The Presets – Apocalypso**
  - Geoffrey Gurrumul Yunupingu – Gurrumul
  - Kasey Chambers & Shane Nicholson – Rattlin' Bones
  - Nick Cave and the Bad Seeds – Dig, Lazarus, Dig!!!
  - The Living End – White Noise

Single of the Year

- **Gabriella Cilmi – "Sweet About Me"**
  - Faker – "This Heart Attack"
  - Sam Sparro – "Black and Gold"
  - The Living End – "White Noise"
  - The Presets – "My People"

Best Male Artist

- **Nick Cave – Dig, Lazarus, Dig!!!**
  - Geoffrey Gurrumul Yunupingu – Gurrumul
  - Paul Kelly – To Her Door (live)
  - Pete Murray – Summer at Eureka
  - Sam Sparro – Sam Sparro

Best Female Artist

- **Gabriella Cilmi – Lessons to Be Learned**
  - Clare Bowditch – The Moon Looked On
  - Holly Throsby – A Loud Call
  - Kylie Minogue – X
  - Missy Higgins – "Peachy"

Best Group

- **The Presets – Apocalypso**
  - Angus & Julia Stone – A Book Like This
  - Faker – Be the Twilight
  - Silverchair – "If You Keep Losing Sleep"
  - The Living End – White Noise

Best Adult Contemporary Album

- **The Panics – Cruel Guards**
  - Clare Bowditch – The Moon Looked On
  - Jimmy Barnes – Out in the Blue
  - Katie Noonan – Skin
  - Robert Forster – The Evangelist

Best Blues & Roots Album

- **The Audreys – When the Flood Comes**
  - Angus & Julia Stone – A Book Like This
  - Jeff Lang – Half Seas Over
  - Mia Dyson – Struck Down
  - The Waifs – Sun Dirt Water

Best Children's Album

- **The Wiggles – You Make Me Feel Like Dancing**
  - Hi-5 – Planet Earth (deluxe edition)
  - Jay Laga'aia – Come Dance and Sing
  - Justine Clarke – Songs to Make You Smile
  - The Fairies – Fairy Fun, Fun, Fun

Best Comedy Release

- **Shaun Micallef – The Expurgated Micallef Tonight**
  - Akmal Saleh – Akmal Live and Uncensored
  - Matt Tilley – Cereal Pest: Gotcha Calls – Three's a Crowd
  - Merrick and Rosso – Live and Totally Wrong!
  - The Umbilical Brothers – Don't Explain

Best Country Album

- **Kasey Chambers & Shane Nicholson – Rattlin' Bones**
  - Catherine Britt – Little Wildflower
  - Melinda Schneider – Be Yourself
  - Sara Storer – Silver Skies
  - The McClymonts – Chaos and Bright Lights

Best Dance Release

- **The Presets – Apocalypso**
  - Cut Copy – In Ghost Colours
  - Mobin Master – Show Me Love
  - Pnau – Pnau
  - The Potbelleez – "Don't Hold Back"

Best Independent Release

- **Geoffrey Gurrumul Yunupingu – Gurrumul**
  - Ben Lee – Ripe
  - British India – Thieves
  - Lior – Corner of an Endless Road
  - Midnight Juggernauts – Dystopia

Best Music DVD

- **Powderfinger** & **Silverchair – Across the Great Divide Tour**
  - Hilltop Hoods – The City of Light
  - Paul Kelly – Live Apples
  - John Butler Trio – Live at Federation Square
  - Wolfmother – Please Experience Wolfmother Live

Best Pop Release

- **Gabriella Cilmi – Lessons to Be Learned**
  - Kylie Minogue – X
  - Operator Please – Yes Yes Vindictive
  - Sam Sparro – "Black and Gold"
  - The Veronicas – Hook Me Up

Best Rock Album

- **The Living End – White Noise**
  - Eddy Current Suppression Ring – Primary Colours
  - Faker – Be the Twilight
  - Gyroscope – Breed Obsession
  - Nick Cave and the Bad Seeds – Dig, Lazarus, Dig!!!

Best Urban Release

- **Bliss n Eso – Flying Colours**
  - A-Love – Ace of Hearts
  - Katalyst – What's Happening
  - Muph & Plutonic – ...And Then Tomorrow Came
  - Spit Syndicate – Towards the Light
  - The Herd – Summerland

Breakthrough Artist – Album

- **Gabriella Cilmi – Lessons to Be Learned**
  - Angus & Julia Stone – A Book Like This
  - Midnight Juggernauts – Dystopia
  - Operator Please – Yes Yes Vindictive
  - Sam Sparro – Sam Sparro

Breakthrough Artist – Single

- **Gabriella Cilmi – "Sweet About Me"**
  - Angus & Julia Stone – "The Beast"
  - Sam Sparro – "Black and Gold"
  - The Panics – "Don't Fight It"
  - The Potbelleez – "Don't Hold Back"

Highest Selling Album

- **Delta Goodrem – Delta**
  - David Campbell – The Swing Sessions 2
  - Guy Sebastian – The Memphis Album
  - The Veronicas – Hook Me Up
  - Tina Arena – Songs of Love & Loss

Highest Selling Single

- **Gabriella Cilmi – "Sweet About Me"**
  - Delta Goodrem – "In This Life"
  - The Potbelleez – "Don't Hold Back"
  - The Veronicas – "Untouched"
  - The Veronicas – "Hook Me Up"

=== Fine Arts Awards ===
Best Classical Album

- **Richard Tognetti, Neal Peres Da Costa, Daniel Yeadon – Bach Sonatas for Violin & Keyboard**
  - Sydney Symphony Orchestra – Brett Dean
  - Elena Kats-Chernin – Slow Food
  - Roger Woodward – Johann Sebastian Bach: Chromatic Fantasia & Fugue, Partita no. 2 & Partita no. 6
  - Slava Grigoryan, Tasmanian Symphony Orchestra – Baroque Guitar Concertos

Best Jazz Album

- **Andrea Keller – Footprints**
  - Deni Hines & James Morrison – The Other Woman
  - Grace Knight – Willow
  - Joe Chindamo – Duende the Romantic Project
  - Mike Nock Project – Meeting of the Waters
  - Jamie Oehlers, Paul Grabowsky, David Beck – Lost and Found

Best Original Soundtrack / Cast / Show Album

- **Chris Lilley – Summer Heights High soundtrack**
  - Cezary Skubiszewski – Night – original soundtrack
  - Cast – Priscilla Queen of the Desert – the Musical
  - The Square – The Square soundtrack
  - Various – Countdown Spectacular 2

Best World Album

- **Geoffrey Gurrumul Yunupingu – Gurrumul**
  - Archie Roach – Journey
  - David Jones – Colours of the Drum
  - Joseph Tawadros – Angel
  - Watussi – Tequila Sangre Fuego

=== Artisan Awards ===
The Artisan Award winners were announced on 10 September. The winners are shown here in bold.

Producer of the Year

- **The Presets (Julian Hamilton & Kim Moyes) – The Presets – Apocalypso**
  - Harry Vanda & Glenn Goldsmith – British India – Thieves
  - Matt Lovell / Shihad – Shihad – Beautiful Machine
  - Michael Hohnen – Geoffrey Gurrumul Yunupingu – Gurrumul
  - Scott Horscroft – The Panics – Cruel Guards

Engineer of the Year

- **Matt Lovell / Shihad – Shihad – Beautiful Machine**
  - Anthony Lycenko – Pete Murray – Summer at Eureka
  - James Ash – Rogue Traders – Better in the Dark
  - Scott Horscroft – The Panics – Cruel Guards
  - Scott Horscroft – The Presets – Apocalypso

Best Cover Art

- **Jonathan Zawada – The Presets – Apocalypso**
  - Aaron Hayward & David Homer (Debaser) – Faker – Be the Twilight
  - Aaron Hayward & David Homer (Debaser) – Kasey Chambers & Shane Nicholson – Rattlin' Bones
  - Alter – Cut Copy – In Ghost Colours
  - IOSHVA – Angus & Julia Stone – A Book Like This

Best Video

- **Kris Moyes – The Presets – "My People"**
  - Adam Callen – Sneaky Sound System – "Kansas City"
  - Angus & Julia Stone / Josh Groom – Angus & Julia Stone – "Just a Boy"
  - Damon Escott & Stephen Lance – Silverchair – "If You Keep Losing Sleep"
  - James Littlemore – Pnau – "Baby"

== ARIA Hall of Fame inductees ==
The following were inducted into the 2008 ARIA Hall of Fame on 1 July:

- ~~Rolf Harris~~ (Note: Rolf Harris was stripped of his induction in 2014 after being convicted for indecent assault.)
- Russell Morris
- Dragon
- Max Merritt
- The Triffids
