= Don't Fight It (The Panics song) =

- Australian vinyl cover art

Single by The Panics

from the album Cruel Guards
- Released: August 2007
- Length: 5:01
- Label: Dew Process
- Songwriters: Jae Laffer, Paul Otway, Drew Wootton, Myles Wootton, Julian Grigor
- Producers: Scott Horscroft, The Panics

The Panics singles chronology
"Factory Girl" (2006)	"Don't Fight It" (2007)	"Get Us Home" (2007)

"Don't Fight It" is a song written and recorded by the Australian band The Panics. It was released in August 2007 as the lead single from the band's third studio album, Cruel Guards. In January 2008, the song was voted in at number 10 on the Triple J Hottest 100, 2007. Following this, the song entered and peaked at number 43 in the ARIA Charts in February 2008, becoming the band's first single in the ARIA top 100.

At the ARIA Music Awards of 2008, the song was nominated for Breakthrough Artist - Single.

The song was used for the end scene of the Ugly Betty episode "Tornado Girl" in 2008 and in episodes of Underbelly. It also appears on the Underbelly soundtrack album.

== Background ==
During the writing of the album, Myles Wootton approached Laffer with a drum loop and trumpet sample that swiftly evolved into "Don't Fight It".

The song is in the key of A major and should be played at a tempo of 92 BPM.

== Reception ==
In a positive album review by Andy Gill from The Independent, he called the song "the best of all".

== Track listing ==
7" single

1. "Don't Fight It"
2. "Get Us Home"

== Charts ==
Chart (2008)	Peak position
Australia (ARIA)	43

== Certifications ==
Certifications for "Don't Fight It"
Region	Certification	Certified units/sales
Australia (ARIA)	Platinum	70,000^{‡}
^{‡} Sales+streaming figures based on certification alone.

== Release history ==
Country	Date	Format	Label	Catalogue
Australia	August 2007	Digital download	Dew Process	Dew90005
United Kingdom	2009	CD	Pública Records	PUBLIC-CDP1
Australia	2009	7" Vinyl	Dew Procee	VISA004
