= Make Me Love You =

Make Me Love You may refer to:

- Make Me Love You (album), 2005 album by PVT
- "Make Me Love You" (song), 2017 song by Taeyeon
