= Don't Fight It =

Don't Fight It may refer to:

- Don't Fight It (album), a 1979 album by Red Rider and the title track of the album
- "Don't Fight It" (Wilson Pickett song), a 1965 song by Wilson Pickett
- "Don't Fight It" (Kenny Loggins & Steve Perry song), a 1982 song by Kenny Loggins and Steve Perry
- "Don't Fight It" (The Panics song), a 2007 song by The Panics
