= Rain on the Humming Wire =

Studio album by The Panics
- Released: 29 July 2011
- Studio: Dreamland and Electric Lady Studios, New York
- Length: 41:08
- Label: Dew Process
- Producer: John O'Mahony; The Panics

The Panics chronology
Cruel Guards (2007)	Rain on the Humming Wire (2011)	Hole in Your Pocket (2016)

Singles from Rain on the Humming Wire
- 1. "Majesty" Released: May 2011; 2. "Endless Road" Released: September 2011; 3. "Not Quite a Home" Released: January 2012

Rain on the Humming Wire is the fourth studio album by Australian indie rock band, The Panics. The album was announced in May 2011 and was released on 29 July 2011 by Dew Process. The album debuted and peaked at number 7 on the ARIA Charts, becoming the band's first top ten album.

At the ARIA Music Awards of 2011, the album was nominated for Best Adult Contemporary Album.

== Reception ==
Professional ratings
Review scores
Source	Rating
AllMusic	3.5/5 stars

Jon O'Brien from AllMusic called Rain on the Humming Wire "a bolder, more confident sound that proves the time away hasn't hampered their ability to create an indie rock anthem or two. Written in Manchester and recorded in Woodstock with producer John O'Mahony, its 11 tracks show traces of their globetrotting past, from the grandiose reverb-soaked Americana of 'One Way Street' to the lilting orchestral pop of 'Not Quite a Home', to the Fleetwood Mac-esque West Coast soft rock of 'Creatures', all of which reveal that frontman Jae Laffer's husky Bob Dylan-esque vocals remain as potent as ever." O'Brien concluded the review saying "Overall, Rain on the Humming Wire is the sound of a band whose members are no longer panicking but are confidently looking forward to swapping theaters for stadiums."

Beat Magazine said "The influence of being away from home is evident in Laffer's song writing. Like all [of] The Panics albums, Rain On The Humming Wire is reflective, intimate and human, but, there's an extra twinge of loneliness and frustration that Laffer blames on dislocation." They continued saying "'Not Quite A Home' exemplifies the influence of dislocation on The Panic's music; descriptive, moving and musically orchestral, it illustrates the feelings of isolation that often accompany homesickness – something the band all experienced while overseas."

A JB HiFi reviewer called it "their most dynamic and electric album [and also] their most tender and poetic."

== Track listing ==
Standard Edition

All tracks written by The Panics.

1. "Majesty"
2. "Endless Road"
3. "Low On Your Supply"
4. "Creatures"
5. "One Way Street"
6. "Not Quite a Home"
7. "Walk That Mile Alone"
8. "Move On"
9. "Shot Down"
10. "How Long"
11. "Everything Is Quiet"

Bonus EP

Limited copies of the CD included a bonus EP called Songs from Another Room.

1. "No More Tears" (Maurice Frawley, Anothony Tasca)
2. "One Way Street" (Acoustic)
3. "Wide Open Road" (David McComb) (Triple J Like a Version)
4. "They Thought I Was Asleep" (Paul Kelly) (Triple J Like a Version)
5. "This Must Be the Place (Naive Melody)" (David Byrne, Chris Frantz, Jerry Harrison, Tina Weymouth)

== Charts ==
Chart (2011)	Peak position
Australian Albums (ARIA)	7

== Release history ==
Country	Date	Format	Label	Catalogue
Australia / New Zealand	29 July 2011	CD, digital download, LP	Dew Process	DEW9000366
Australia / New Zealand	29 July 2011	CD + EP	Dew Process	DEW9000375
