= Crack in the Wall =

EP by The Panics
- Released: 5 April 2004
- Recorded: 2003/04
- Venue: Kingdom Studio
- Length: 30.24
- Label: littleBIGMAN Records
- Producer: The Panics

The Panics chronology
A House on a Street in a Town I'm From (2003)	Crack in the Wall (2004)	Sleeps Like a Curse (2005)

Crack in the Wall is an EP by Australian band, The Panics. It was released in April 2004 by littleBIGMAN Records. The EP was recorded in the Australian summer of 2003/2004 at Kingdom Studio (an old converted Masonic hall in Perth). The rear cover of the EP and inside photographs are of the band recording the EP, taken in the recording room of the studio, where the record was made.

The single "Cash" came about because Johnny Cash died around the time they were rehearsing the words and writing the tune. Laffer said "At the time, I think because we were so into the Johnny Cash stuff that he was doing – the American Recordings stuff – we started calling the song 'Cash' because it had a country feel to it … It wasn't about him; it was about his kind of character."

On the strength of the album The Panics were personally selected by Grandaddy as their support act on that band's national tour of Australia.

In May 2020, the EP was re-released to streaming media. Laffer said "We moved pretty quick after our first album, we had enough in the tank that we set about making an EP before the next full length." Laffer continued "There were a few longing, romantic songs, I remember feeling like I could really own that. I was coming up with lyrics all the time and felt totally proud of the role."

== Reception ==
Professional ratings
Review scores
Source	Rating
Sputnik Music	4.5/5 stars

A reviewer from Sputnik Music said "Close Enough Ain't Good Enough" is possibly in their all time top 20 songs. They said "Overall this album is a must for anyone looking for a great alternative band with some great catchy tunes accompanied by some of the best lyrics you'll ever hear, that has not sold out. Please go out and buy it, it will be worth the worry."

== Track listing ==
All tracks are written by Jae Laffer, Paul Otway, Drew Wootton, Myles Wootton and Julian Grigor.

Crack in the Wall
No.	Title	Length
1.	"Southern"	5:18
2.	"Cash"	4:15
3.	"In Your Head"	4:03
4.	"Like an Aching Lung"	4:07
5.	"Lost in Green Eyes"	3:30
6.	"Close Enough Ain't Good Enough"	5:08
7.	"Crack in the Wall"	4:01

== Personnel ==
- Jae Laffer - vocals, guitar, harmonica, keyboards
- Drew Wootton - guitar
- Jules Douglas - guitar, backing vocals, keyboards, slide guitar
- Myles Wootton - drums, sampler, percussion, harmonica, programming
- Paul Otway - bass, backing vocals
- Freya Mengler - backing vocals ("In Your Head")
- Richard Szewczyk - piano accordion ("In Your Head")

== Release history ==
Country	Date	Format	Label	Catalogue
Australia	April 2004	CD	littleBIGMAN	big6
various	18 May 2020	streaming	littleBIGMAN	
