= Cruel Guards =

Studio album by The Panics
- Released: 13 October 2007
- Genre: Indie rock
- Length: 44:00
- Label: Dew Process
- Producers: Scott Horscroft; The Panics

The Panics chronology
Sleeps Like a Curse (2005)	Cruel Guards (2007)	Rain on the Humming Wire (2011)

Singles from Cruel Guards
- 1. "Don't Fight It" Released: August 2007; 2. "Get Us Home" Released: November 2007; 3. "Feeling is Gone" Released: April 2008

Cruel Guards is the third studio album by Australian indie rock band, The Panics. It was released on 13 October 2007 by Dew Process. The album debuted and peaked at number 18 on the ARIA Charts and was certified gold in 2008.

The album was Triple J's feature album for the week of 8 October 2007. At the J Awards of 2007, the album won Australian Album of the Year. Drew Wootton said "It was amazing to win that award. We celebrated for days with the Triple J staff and then just fell over."

At the ARIA Music Awards of 2008, the album won Best Adult Contemporary Album while Scott Horscroft was nominated for Producer of the Year and Engineer the Year.

== Reception ==
Professional ratings
Review scores
Source	Rating
AllMusic	3.5/5 stars
The Dwarf	(favorable)
FasterLouder	(favorable)
The Independent	3/5 stars
Mess and Noise	(favorable)
Polaroids of Androids	3.7/10

Adam Greenberg from AllMusic said "Frontman Jae Laffer gives a husky delivery that swoons just a bit here and there over the top of a layer of guitar and drums, an occasional bit of keyboard inflection, and depending on the song, a bit of classic Motown-style strings." Greenberg continued "The band tells their stories, touching on the grey areas of pop, alluding to U2 in the rhythm guitar for a moment in 'Live Without'. They touch on darker beach songs in 'Confess', they evoke contemporary Bob Dylan recordings in 'Sundowner' with an almost weary, dim delivery but a grandiose chorus movement. The album defies a clear definition other than 'adult contemporary' but it's attractive, it's catchy, and it's exploratory all at once. Definitely worth a spin or two."

== Track listing ==
=== Standard Edition ===
All tracks are written by Jae Laffer, Paul Otway, Drew Wootton, Myles Wootton and Julian Douglas.

No.	Title	Length
1.	"Get Us Home"	4:16
2.	"Ruins"	3:42
3.	"Creaks"	4:02
4.	"Don't Fight It"	5:01
5.	"Feeling Is Gone"	3:23
6.	"Cruel Guards"	5:15
7.	"Live Without"	4:17
8.	"Something in the Garden"	4:57
9.	"Confess"	3:49
10.	"Sundowner"	5:18
11.	"My Best Mistake" (iTunes bonus track)	3:13
12.	"In Your Head" (iTunes bonus track)	4:02
13.	"Cash" (iTunes bonus track)	4:15
14.	"Kid You're a Dreamer" (iTunes bonus track)	3:20

=== Bonus EP ===
Limited copies of the CD included a bonus EP of covers called Join the Dots.

1. "Lazyitis" (Mark Day, Paul Davis, Paul Ryder, Gary Whelan, Shaun Ryder, John Lennon, Paul McCartney, Sly Stone, David Essex) - 3:56
2. "One Too Many Mornings" (Bob Dylan) – 2:28
3. "Factory Girl" (Mick Jagger, Keith Richards) – 2:31
4. "Who By Fire" (Leonard Cohen) – 3:04
5. "Just Like a Woman" (Dylan) – 4:47

== Personnel ==
The Panics

- Jae Laffer – vocals, guitar, piano, harmonica
- Myles Wootton – drums, percussion, vocals, orchestral arrangements
- Jules Douglas – guitar, piano, vocals, hammond organ
- Drew Wootton – guitar
- Paul Otway – bass, vocals

Additional musicians

- Naomi Radom – strings
- Simon Ferenci – trumpet

== Charts ==
Chart (2007–2008)	Peak position
Australian Albums (ARIA)	18

== Certifications ==
Region	Certification	Certified units/sales
Australia (ARIA)	Gold	35,000^{^}
^{^} Shipments figures based on certification alone.

== Release history ==
Country	Date	Format	Label	Catalogue
Australia	13 October 2007	CD, digital download, LP	Dew Process	DEW900017 / DEW9000119
Australia	13 October 2007	CD + EP	Dew Process	DEW90004
North America	2007	CD, digital download	Dew Process	DEW74987
United Kingdom	2009	CD, digital download	Pública Records	Public CD 3
