= Kid You're a Dreamer =

"Kid you're a Dreamer"

Single by The Panics

from the album A House on a Street in a Town I'm From
- Released: February 2003
- Studio: Kingdom Studios
- Length: 3:24
- Label: LittleBIGMAN Records
- Songwriter(s): Jae Laffer, Paul Otway, Drew Wootton, Myles Wootton and Julian Grigor

The Panics singles chronology
"How's It Feel" (2002)	"Kid you're a Dreamer" (2003)	"Hole in the Head" (2004)

"Kid You're a Dreamer" is a song written and recorded by Australian band, The Panics. It was released in February 2003 as the lead single from the band's debut studio album, A House on a Street in a Town I'm From. It was recorded at Kingdom Studios by Dom Monteleone and at The Hit Factory with Stephen Bond. The drums and bass guitar were recorded at Kingdom Studios, while the piano was recorded at the Hyde Park Hotel with the remaining instruments and vocals completed at The Hit Factory.

"Kid You're a Dreamer" was featured as the opening theme for the Australian primetime television Medical drama, The Surgeon. It also featured on the first Home and Hosed: The First Harvest compilation album by Triple J in 2003.

The B-side "Alma" is a reference to a show Laffer played at the psychiatric ward at the Fremantle Hospital (on Alma Street) in December 2002.

== Track listing ==
1. "Kid You're a Dreamer" - 3:24
2. "I Give In" - 3:37
3. "Alma" - 2:48

== Personnel ==
- Jae Laffer - vocals, guitar, keyboards, harmonica
- Drew Wootton - guitar
- Myles Wootton - drums
- Paul Otway - bass
- Jules Douglas - guitar
