= Know My Name =

Know My Name may refer to:

== Songs ==
- "Know My Name", by DJ Mustard from the 2016 album Cold Summer
- "Know My Name", by Djumbo from the 2005 album Jump
- "Know My Name", by Frankmusik from the 2015 album For You
- "Know My Name", by the Goo Goo Dolls from the 1990 album Hold Me Up
- "Know My Name", by Hello Demons...meet Skeletons from the 2011 EP Uncomfortable Silence
- "Know My Name", by Jamelia from the 2006 album Walk with Me
- "Know My Name", by Blake Lewis from the 2007 album A.D.D. (Audio Day Dream)
- "Know My Name", by Nightmares on Wax from the 2002 album Mind Elevation
- "Know My Name", by The Panics from the 2016 album Hole in Your Pocket
- "Know My Name", by Radamiz from the 2019 album Nothing Changes If Nothing Changes
- "Know My Name", by Rhino Bucket from the 2009 album The Hardest Town

== Other uses ==
- Know My Name: A Memoir, a 2019 book by Chanel Miller about People v. Turner
- Know My Name, an exhibition at the National Gallery of Australia held from 2020
