= The Panics =

Australian indie rock band

- The Panics November 2008, Melbourne, Australia

Background information
- Origin: Perth, Western Australia
- Genres: Rock
- Years active: 2000–present
- Labels: LittleBIGMAN Records; Dew Process
- Members: Jae Laffer; Drew Wootton; Myles Wootton; Paul Otway; Jules Douglas

The Panics are an indie rock band originally from Perth, Western Australia, and currently based in Melbourne, Victoria.

== History ==
=== 2000–2006: Band formation and LittleBigMan Records ===
The band started out while Jae Laffer (then known by his actual first name, Justin) and Drew Wootton were still at high school in Kalamunda, an outer suburb of Perth, Western Australia. Laffer and Wootton met on their first day of school. The duo added Drew's younger brother Myles on drums, Paul Otway on bass and Jules Douglas on slide guitar, keyboards and vocals and formed The Panics.

After being spotted playing at the Inglewood Hotel by Happy Mondays' Gaz Whelan and Pete Carroll, following Happy Mondays' Perth performance at The Big Day Out in 2000, they were the first signing to the UK-based label LittleBIGMAN Records.

Laffer later said "That's what's been really cool about us and the label is that it was just the fact it was new for everyone and we weren't just another band that they were adding to their roster. It felt really exciting to be part of a label that seemed to have really good ideals and be run by guys who certainly have their heads in the right place and are pro-artist as opposed to pro-money and I truly believe that."

The Panics first release was a self-titled EP in January 2002. Tracks "My Brilliant Career" and "Give Me Some Good Luck" enjoyed high rotation on Australian radio station Triple J A second EP was released in 2002 and tracks "This Day Last Year" and "How's It Feel" were also played on Triple J. In 2002, The Panics were the first Australian band to be invited to play at In the City, the UK's annual music convention. Laffer said "It was just a very spooky event. It was like playing a pub in Perth. It was condensed down to a couple of nights. In this one kind of block in Salford in Manchester there was about ten pubs all within walking distance, each with about five bands playing a night and just a huge huge amount of industry just doing the rounds, walking through. Every person in the crowd had a laminate. Our place was packed when we played which was great but it's very hard to read industry people 'cause they don't want to jump around and cheer. We'd just finished recording and I remember being on stage and we were just having a laugh because it was just so great to be playing in England."

While in England they commenced recording tracks for their debut album. A House on a Street in a Town I'm From was released in 2003 to local critical praise and included the single "Kid You're a Dreamer", which was used as the credits theme music for the Australian drama The Surgeon on Network Ten. The band toured Australia for the first time and also played a series of gigs with Morrissey, Gomez, Grandaddy, The Church and Badly Drawn Boy. They went on to complete several sell out national headline tours of Australia..

In late 2004, the band headed back to England for a second UK tour, including supporting the Happy Mondays at a sold-out show to over 12,000 people on Clapham Common in London. Whilst in Manchester, they commenced writing new material for their next album,

The band's second album, Sleeps Like a Curse was released in August 2005, and was nominated for the Triple J Australian Album of the Year. Shortly after the release of the album, the band relocated to Melbourne.

In October 2006 they released a three track single "Factory Girl", a cover of the Rolling Stones' "Factory Girl" from their 1968 album, Beggars Banquet.

=== 2007–2010: Dew Process and Cruel Guards ===
In February 2007 The Panics signed with Dew Process, and on 13 October 2007, the band released their third studio album, Cruel Guards which peaked at number 18 on the ARIA Charts and was certified gold. The album was Triple J's feature album for the week of 8 October 2007 and went on to win the 2007 J Award for Triple J Australian Album of the Year.

The album's lead single "Don't Fight It" was released in August 2007 was featured in an episode of the Australian television drama series, Underbelly and appears on the soundtrack album. It was also used for the end scene of the Ugly Betty episode, "Tornado Girl". The song became the band's first to reach the ARIA top 50, peaking at number 43

At the ARIA Music Awards of 2008, the band were nominated for four awards, winning the ARIA Award for Best Adult Contemporary Album. Jae Laffer said "We like to consider ourselves a bit more contemporary than adult, but we'll take that." He added "The award was nice recognition after seven years together as a band. It's almost like just a bit of validation for a lot of hard work. Also it keeps the band a little bit hungry just knowing that people are listening."

In early 2010, The Panics played a show at Kings Park, Perth backed by the West Australian Symphony Orchestra. The orchestra features many performers not unaccustomed to this form of cross-over with many, notably Michael Ingle, having previously played with Ben Lee and The Cat Empire.

The band contributed the song "No More Tears" on the Maurice Frawley 2010 tribute album, Long Gone Whistle - The Songs of Maurice Frawley.

=== 2011–present: Rain on the Humming Wire and Hole in Your Pocket ===
On 29 July 2011, the band released their fourth studio album Rain on the Humming Wire, which peaked at number 7 on the ARIA Charts, becoming their first top ten album. At the ARIA Music Awards of 2011, the album was nominated for ARIA Award for Best Adult Alternative Album.

In 2013, The Panics were commissioned to write an original soundtrack for the ABC archival documentary Girt by Sea (2014). The film premiered at the Perth International Arts Festival in February 2014 where The Panics performed the score live to a sold-out audience.

Before recording their next album, the band had some time off with Laffer saying in 2016 "The members felt as though they were running low on steam, unable to produce much fruitful work." On 7 October 2016, the band released their fifth studio album Hole in Your Pocket. Upon release, lead singer Jae Laffer spoke with Double J saying there is a "beauty of making a record after a significant break [as] you've evolved as a person from when you were writing your last batch of songs", adding "You experience some new things that you haven't touched on before, musically and lyrically." Despite positive reviews, the album peaked at number 52 on the ARIA Chart.

Commencing fortnightly in April 2020, the band re-released their back catalogue on streaming services.

== Members ==
- Jae Laffer – vocals, guitar, keyboards
- Drew Wootton – guitar
- Myles Wootton – drums
- Paul Otway – bass
- Jules Douglas – keyboard, guitar, vocals

== Discography ==
=== Studio albums ===
Title	Details	Peak chart positions	Certifications
Title	Details	AUS	Certifications
A House on a Street in a Town I'm From	Released: August 2003; Label: LittleBIGMAN Records (big3); Format: CD	—	
Sleeps Like a Curse	Released: August 2005; Label: LittleBIGMAN Records (big7); Format: CD	40	
Cruel Guards	Released: 13 October 2007; Label: Dew Process (DEW900017); Format: CD, CD+EP, digital download, LP	18	ARIA: Gold
Rain on the Humming Wire	Released: 29 July 2011; Label: Dew Process (DEW9000375); Format: CD, CD+EP, digital download, LP	7	
Hole in Your Pocket	Released: 7 October 2016; Label: Dew Process (DEW9000879); Format: CD, digital download, streaming	52	
"—" denotes a recording that did not chart in that territory.

=== Extended plays ===
Title	Details
The Panics (EP 1)	Released: January 2002; Label: LittleBIGMAN Records (little3); Format: CD
The Panics (EP 2)	Released: July 2002; Label: LittleBIGMAN Records (little4); Format: CD
Crack in the Wall	Released: April 2004; Label: LittleBIGMAN Records (big6); Format: CD; Note: released as a mini-album

=== Singles ===
Year	Title	Peak chart positions	Certifications	Album
Year	Title	AUS	Certifications	Album
2002	"My Brilliant Career"	—		The Panics (EP 1)
2002	"Give Me Some Good Luck"	—		The Panics (EP 1)
2002	"This Day Last Year"	—		The Panics (EP 2)
2002	"How's It Feel"	—		The Panics (EP 2)
2003	"Kid You're a Dreamer"	—		A House on a Street in a Town I'm from
2004	"In Your Head"	—		Cracks in the Wall
2004	"Cash"	—		Cracks in the Wall
2005	"It's Not a Thing"	—		Sleeps Like a Curse
2005	"My Best Mistake"	—		Sleeps Like a Curse
2006	"Factory Girl"	—		Cruel Guards (bonus disc)
2007	"Don't Fight It"	43	ARIA: Platinum	Cruel Guards
2007	"Get Us Home"	—		Cruel Guards
2008	"Feeling is Gone"	—		Cruel Guards
2011	"Majesty"	—		Rain on the Humming Wire
2011	"Endless Road"	—		Rain on the Humming Wire
2012	"Not Quite a Home"	—		Rain on the Humming Wire
2016	"Weatherman"	—		Hole in Your Pocket
2017	"Hole in Your Pocket"	—		Hole in Your Pocket
"—" denotes a recording that did not chart in that territory.

== Awards and nominations ==
=== ARIA Music Awards ===
The ARIA Music Awards is an annual awards ceremony that recognises excellence, innovation, and achievement across all genres of Australian music. The Panics has won 1 award from 5 nominations.

Year	Nominee / work	Award	Result
2008	Cruel Guards	Best Adult Contemporary Album	Won
2008	Scott Horscroft for Cruel Guards	Producer of the Year	Nominated
2008	Scott Horscroft for Cruel Guards	Engineer of the Year	Nominated
2008	"Don't Fight It"	Breakthrough Artist - Single	Nominated
2011	Rain on the Hummingwire	Best Adult Alternative Album	Nominated

=== The J Awards ===
The J Awards are an annual series of Australian music awards that were established by the Australian Broadcasting Corporation's youth-focused radio station Triple J, and judged by on-air teams at the station.

Year	Nominee / work	Award	Result
2005	Sleeps Like a Curse	Triple J Australian Album of the Year	Nominated
2007	Cruel Guards	Triple J Australian Album of the Year	Won

=== WAMI Awards ===
The Western Australian Music Industry Awards (commonly known as WAMis) are annual awards presented to the local contemporary music industry, put on by the Western Australian Music Industry Association Inc (WAM) and celebrates achievements of Western Australian artists.

Year	Nominee / work	Award	Result
2002	The Panics (EP 1)	Most Popular Local Original Single/EP	Won
2002	themselves	Most Popular New Band	Won
2003	themselves	Most Popular Local Original Act	Won
2008	themselves	Most Popular Act	Won
2008	themselves	Best Commercial Pop Act	Won
2008	Cruel Guards	Most Popular Album	Nominated
