= Sleeps Like a Curse =

Studio album by The Panics
- Released: 8 August 2005
- Recorded: Sydney, 2005
- Genre: Rock
- Length: 44.48
- Label: littleBIGMAN Records
- Producer: Tim Whitten and The Panics

The Panics chronology
Crack in the Wall (2004)	Sleeps Like a Curse (2005)	Cruel Guards (2007)

Sleeps Like a Curse is the second studio album by Australian band, The Panics. It was released on 8 August 2005 by littleBIGMAN Records. The album debuted and peaked at number 40 on the ARIA Charts, becoming the band's first charting album.

At the J Award of 2005, the album was nominated for Australian Album of the Year.

In May 2020, the album was re-issued to streaming services. Laffer said "Recorded in Sydney, this album began in Manchester, England. We had an apartment in this old building, and all the other dwellings were empty. We broke in to one and it was waterlogged and all that was left was a Yothu Yindi CD on the floor. Every day we ordered a black cab because it could fit all 5 of us and we would go to our rehearsal room in this Industrial Estate in Salford that no cab driver would agree to pick us up from, so we had to walk a few blocks, only this boxing gym was open. I think we stayed safe through being too strange to bother with."

== Background and release ==
Professional ratings
Review scores
Source	Rating
Sputnik Music	4.2/5 stars

The Panics started writing new material for this album late 2004 whilst they were touring the UK. In February 2005, they flew back to start an Australian tour and they went straight into the studio when the tour ended. The album was produced by Tim Whitten (The Clouds, Powderfinger, Art of Fighting, The Go Betweens, The Necks, 78 Saab and The Smiths) and it was completed within a week.

== Track listing ==
All tracks written by Jae Laffer, Paul Otway, Drew Wootton, Myles Wootton and Julian Grigor.

1. "One Too Many Itches" – 4:00
2. "Sleeps Like a Curse" – 3:55
3. "My Best Mistake" – 3:13
4. "Like an Unwelcome Guest" – 3:56
5. "Someone Somewhere Somehow" – 4:54
6. "Twin Sisters" – 3:01
7. "Minor A" – 3:01
8. "Speak It" – 3:25
9. "It's Not a Thing" – 3:21
10. "The General Calling" – 5:13
11. "Keep an Eye on Me" – 5:07
12. [untitled] – 1:40

== Personnel ==
=== The Panics ===
- Jae Laffer – vocals, guitars, keyboards, glockenspiel
- Drew Wootton – guitars, bass
- Paul Otway – bass, guitars
- Julian Douglas – guitars, keyboards, vocals
- Myles Wootton – drums, percussion, glockenspiel, samples

=== Additional musicians ===
- Wibbeke Rezcek – vocals ("My Best Mistake", "Like an Unwelcome Guest", Keep an Eye on Me")
- Jacinta McCormick – vocals ("One Too Many Itches")
- Kathy Potter – viola ("The General Calling")
- Tristen Parr – cello ("The General Calling")

== Charts ==
Chart (2005)	Peak position
Australian Albums (ARIA)	40

== Release history ==
Country	Date	Format	Label	Catalogue
Australia	8 August 2005	CD	littleBIGMAN	big7
various	May 2020	streaming	littleBIGMAN	
