= The Panics (EP 1) =

EP by The Panics
- Released: January 2002
- Recorded: 2001
- Studio: Survival Studios; Steve Bond's, Highgate
- Genre: Alternative rock; indie pop
- Length: 18:05
- Label: littleBIGMAN
- Producer: Steve Bond; Mark 'Sid' Eaton; Rob Grant; Adam Keane

The Panics chronology
The Panics (2002)	The Panics (EP 2) (2002)

The Panics is the debut extended play by Australian alternative rock band, the Panics. It was released in January 2002 by littleBIGMAN Records.

The EP did not reach the ARIA top 100, but peaked at No. 19 on the ARIA Hitseekers Singles chart.

In 2002 the EP received a nomination and subsequently won the WAMi Award for Most Popular Local Original Single/EP.

Two of its five tracks, "My Brilliant Career" and "Four Walls", were recorded by Adam Keane at Survival Studios, with strings recorded in Gooseberry Hill by a friend of Jae Laffer. "Give Me Some Good Luck" and "Wake Up" were recorded at Steve Bond's house in Highgate, Western Australia. The EP was then mastered at Poons Head in Fremantle by Rob Grant. The artwork of the cover was done by Drew Wootton.

"My Brilliant Career" and "Give Me Some Good Luck" enjoyed high rotation on Australian radio station Triple J and community radio stations around Australia. The film clip for "Give Me Some Good Luck" was made by Nick Maher, and consists of footage from the band's performance at the Hyde Park Hotel in April 2002.

In April 2020, the EP was re-released to streaming media. Laffer said "I've just had a listen to this in full, probably for the first time since we made it (19 years ago!). Plenty of imagery comes flooding back with the music from the time we made this... I have good memories of using all the bedrooms of Steves place in Highgate and laying down 'Give Me Some Good Luck' and 'Wake Up' [with] housemates hanging about." Laffer added "The band sound great, really hungry, the vocals are nervous but sound good."

== Reception ==
Richard Parapar of Oz Music Project reflected on the EP, saying "[they] have a clear UK indie pop sound and influences from bands such as Teenage Fanclub and The Verve are evident on their debut five track EP. Although consisting of mainly older material the EP does have good variation... Frontman Jae Laffer's laid back gentle vocals are a delight to hear and shows The Panics are a band to look out for this year."

== Track listing ==
1. "Give Me Some Good Luck" (Julian Grigor (a.k.a. Jules Douglas), Justin "Jae" Laffer, Paul Otway, Drew Wootton, Myles Wootton) – 3:42
2. "On Fire" (Laefer, D Wootton) – 1:26
3. "My Brilliant Career" (Laefer, Simon Sieradzki, D Wootton, M Wooton) – 4:09
4. "Wake Up" (Laefer, S Sieradzki, D Wootton, M Wooton) – 3:15
5. "Four Walls" (Laefer, Otway, D Wooton, M Wooton) – 5:16

== Release history ==
Country	Date	Format	Label	Catalogue
Australia	January 2002	CD	littleBIGMAN	little3
various	3 April 2020	streaming	littleBIGMAN	
