= The Surgeon (TV series) =

2005 Australian TV series

- Created by: John Edwards
- Starring: Justine Clarke; Sam Worthington; Khalid Malik
- Country of origin: Australia
- No. of series: 1
- No. of episodes: 8

Production
- Running time: approx. 0:22 (excludes ads)
- Production company: Southern Star Entertainment

Original release
- Network: Network Ten
- Release: 13 October – 1 December 2005

The Surgeon is a 2005 Australian television medical drama. It screened at 9:30pm on Thursdays on Network Ten and in Ireland early morning on RTÉ One. The show was based at a fictional hospital named Sydney General Hospital.

The first season consisted of eight half-hour episodes. The show was nominated for two Logie Awards (Most Outstanding Drama Series & Most Outstanding Actress) as well as two AACTAs (Best Lead Actress in a Television Drama and Best Telefeature or Mini Series).

== Cast ==
=== Main / regular ===
- Justine Clarke as Dr. Eve Agius
- Sam Worthington as Dr. Sam Dash
- Nicholas Bell as Dr. Julian Sierson
- Christopher Morris as Dr. Abe Morris
- Katie Wall as Siobhan Kerry
- Matthew Newton as Dr. Nick Steele
- Matthew Zeremes as Dr. Lachie Hatsatouris
- Khalid Malik as Dr. Rob Singh
- Chum Ehelepola as Dr. Ravi Jayawardener

=== Guests ===
- Ben Oxenbould as Steve Glass (1 episode)
- Betty Lucas as Miriam Beck (2 episodes)
- Josef Ber as Obstetric Registrar (1 episode)
- Tiriel Mora as Dr Jordy Roberts (3 episodes)

== Episodes ==
(Episode information retrieved from Australian Television Information Archive).

No.	Title	Directed by	Written by	Original release date
1	"Episode 1"	Matthew Saville	Judi McCrossin	13 October 2005
2	"Episode 2"	Matthew Saville	Judi McCrossin	20 October 2005
3	"Episode 3"	Matthew Saville	Judi McCrossin	27 October 2005
4	"Episode 4"	Tony Krawitz	Fiona Seres	3 November 2005
5	"Episode 5"	Tony Krawitz	Judi McCrossin	10 November 2005
6	"Episode 6"	Rebecca Barry	Fiona Seres	17 November 2005
7	"Episode 7"	Rebecca Barry	Fiona Seres	24 November 2005
8	"Episode 8"	Rebecca Barry	Judi McCrossin & Ray Moynihan	1 December 2005

== Credits theme ==
"Kid You're A Dreamer" by Perth band The Panics from their first album A House on a Street in a Town I'm From was used as the opening credits theme music for the series.
