= PVT (band) =

Australian band

- Also known as: Pivot (1999–2010)
- Origin: Sydney, New South Wales, Australia
- Genres: Electronic, post-rock, experimental
- Years active: 1999–2017
- Labels: Sensory Projects, Warp Records, Create/Control, Spark & Opus
- Past members: Richard Pike; Laurence Pike; Dave Miller; Adrian Klumpes; Neal Sutherland; Dave Bowman

PVT (disemvoweling of pivot) were an Australian experimental band formed in Sydney in 1999. The band held the same line-up from 2005 onwards, featuring brothers Richard and Laurence Pike alongside Perth musician Dave Miller. The band released five studio albums before quietly disbanding in the late 2010s.

== History ==
PVT was formed as Pivot in Sydney in 1999 by brothers Richard Pike and Laurence Pike. The band spent the subsequent four years developing their sound and working on their debut album, with Richard producing. The duo eventually grew to a five-piece, including keyboardist Adrian Klumpes, bassist Neal Sutherland and turntablist Dave Bowman. They released their debut album, Make Me Love You, in August 2005 on Sensory Records. It was nominated for a J Award by national youth broadcaster Triple J. The band added Perth electronica artist Dave Miller in late 2005, omitting the old members from their line-up and becoming a three piece.

In 2008, PVT signed to UK label Warp Records and O Soundtrack My Heart was released in August 2008 and the band toured across Europe and the UK. Notable shows included an appearance at 2008 Meltdown with Yellow Magic Orchestra, Glastonbury and invitations from Arctic Monkeys, Sigur Rós and Gary Numan to support on Australian tours. The band has been known to cover Talking Heads' "I Zimbra" live using live sampling to replicate up to 12 parts, and included a live version of the song on the B-side of their "O Soundtrack My Heart" tour-only 7".

In 2009 they contributed a cover of the Grizzly Bear song "Colorado" to the Warp20 (Recreated) compilation, as well as having their song "Fool in Rain" covered by Scott Herren's 'Diamond Watch Wrists'. They released the album Church With No Magic in July 2010.

In 2012, the band performed as part of the Vivid Live Festival at the Sydney Opera House. They were also announced as the support for Gotye's arena tour of Australia in December. In the same year the band signed to Felte and to Australian independent record label Create/Control in 2012 and released their 4th album Homosapien on 8 February 2013 in Australia and New Zealand. Following the release of their fifth album New Spirit in 2017, the band quietly split up and pursued individual projects.

== Name ==
The first two releases by the band appeared under the name Pivot. In 2010, the group decided to remove the vowels from their name after a legal claim was made from an American band of the same name. Although in print it is PVT, the band can legally be called Pivot in all territories outside USA. Richard Pike said "It was frustrating and kind of ridiculous, but it became quickly obvious that it was a legal battle in the US we may not even win, and one we just couldn’t afford to lose. So in the end, we weren't fazed by it. Altering the name just seemed to be another step in the process for the record to come out and be heard… At the end of the day it’s small change..."

== Members ==
Final line-up

- Richard Pike – vocals, guitar, bass, keyboards, production (1999–2017)
- Laurence Pike – drums, keyboards, percussion (1999–2017)
- Dave Miller – synthesizer, programming, electronics, production (2005–2017)

Former members

- Adrian Klumpes – keyboards (2000–2005)
- Neal Sutherland – bass (2000–2005)
- Dave Bowman – turntables (2000–2005)

== Discography ==
=== Albums ===
Title	Details
Make Me Love You	Released: 2005; Label: Sensory Projects (SRP039); Format: CD, digital download
O Soundtrack My Heart	Released: August 2008; Label: Warp Records (WARPCD166); Format: CD, 2xLP, digital download
Church With No Magic	Released: July 2010; Label: Warp Records (WARPCD198); Format: CD, LP, digital download
Homosapien	Released: February 2013; Label: Felte, Create/Control, Spark & Opus (CC0000114); Format: CD, LP, digital download
New Spirit	Released: February 2017; Label: Felte, Create/Control, Spark & Opus (CC0001310); Format: CD, LP, digital download

== Awards and nominations ==
=== J Award ===
The J Awards are an annual series of Australian music awards that were established by the Australian Broadcasting Corporation's youth-focused radio station Triple J. They commenced in 2005.

Year	Nominee / work	Award	Result
J Award of 2005	Make Me Love You	Australian Album of the Year	Nominated

=== National Live Music Awards ===
The National Live Music Awards (NLMAs) are a broad recognition of Australia's diverse live industry, celebrating the success of the Australian live scene. The awards commenced in 2016.

Year	Nominee / work	Award	Result
National Live Music Awards of 2016	Laurence Pike (PVT)	Live Drummer of the Year	Nominated
