= Clare Bowditch =

Australian musician

- Bowditch at the Great Escape music festival in 2006

Background information
- Born: 9 September 1975 (age 51); Melbourne, Victoria, Australia
- Genres: Folk, rock, pop
- Occupations: Musician; actress; author; Allen & Unwin
- Instruments: Vocals, guitar, pianist, drummer
- Years active: 1999–present
- Website: www.clarebowditch.com

Clare Bowditch (born 9 September 1975) is an Australian musician, author, and occasional actress.

At the 2020 ABIA (Australian Book Industry Awards) she won ‘Best New Australian Author’ for her best-selling 2019 memoir Your Own Kind of Girl.

At the ARIA Music Awards of 2006, Bowditch won the ARIA Award for Best Female Artist and was nominated for a Logie Award for her work on the TV series Offspring in 2012. She has toured with Gotye and Leonard Cohen, written for Harpers Bazaar, Rolling Stone and Drum.

== Life and career ==
=== 1975-1997: Early life ===
Bowditch was born in Melbourne and raised in the suburb of Sandringham.

She graduated from the University of Melbourne's School of Creative Arts with a Bachelor of Creative Arts (BCA), a now-defunct degree.

=== 1998-2002: Red Raku ===
Bowditch began writing songs at the age of three and continued writing them in private until 1998 when she met John Hedigan and formed a band called Red Raku. Red Raku self-released two albums, Sweetly Sedated (1998) and Roda Leisis May (2002). Producer and drummer Marty Brown collaborated with the band and in 2002 Bowditch and Brown had a daughter.

=== 2003-2008: The Feeding Set ===
In 2003, Libby Chow and Warren Bloomer joined and the band changed their name to Clare Bowditch & The Feeding Set. The band released Autumn Bone. Later in 2003, they signed with Capitol Records which rereleased the album.

In 2005, Bowditch was invited by Deborah Conway to take part in the Broad Festival project with three other Australian female artists at which they performed their own and each other's songs. With Bowditch and Conway were Sara Storer, Katie Noonan and Ruby Hunter.

In October 2005, Bowditch and The Feeding Set released their second album, What Was Left, on EMI. The album peaked at number 35 on the ARIA Chart. At the ARIA Music Awards of 2006, Bowditch won the ARIA Award for Best Female Artist.

In October 2007, Melbourne guitarist Tim Harvey (Jade Imagine) joined the band and Bowditch and the Feeding Set released their third album, The Moon Looked On. The album peaked at number 29 on the ARIA Chart. At the ARIA Music Awards of 2008, the album was nominated for two awards.

In late 2008, Bowditch completed a twenty-five date sold out solo tour through major and regional venues in Australia, during which time she was supported by Australian band Hot Little Hands.

=== 2009-2010: The New Slang ===
In 2009, Bowditch and her family temporarily relocated to Berlin, Germany, where she wrote the album Modern Day Addiction. The album was partly recorded with producer Mocky (who has also worked with Feist, Gonzales, Jamie Lidell and Peaches) at the Hansa studios in Berlin and completed in Australia with her expanded eight-piece band the New Slang. The album marked a change in direction for Bowditch, having been written on a Casio keyboard and piano.

In October 2009, she released her first single, "The Start of War". The song also features Bowditch's partner, Marty Brown, and Mick Harvey, formerly of Nick Cave and the Bad Seeds. The album became both 3RRR's and ABC Radio National's Album of the Week. The album peaked at number 10 on the ARIA Charts. At the ARIA Music Awards of 2010, the album was nominated for three awards.

Bowditch supported Leonard Cohen on his 2010 Australian tour. Bowditch was joined by fellow Australian musician Deborah Conway, who was the support act for the second show of the Melbourne stop of the tour. Bowditch said in a 2012 interview that she received a marriage proposal from Cohen during the tour. Bowditch turned down the proposal and explained, "I got to spend all that time with him. Most of the time I just sat there watching and smiling and being amazed at the theatre of it all. He was absolutely charming."

=== 2011-present: solo work ===
In 2011, Bowditch co-wrote and performed a musical stage show based on the life and music of Eva Cassidy. The show, Tales from the Life of Eva Cassidy, featured Bowditch singing Cassidy's songs in the style of Cassidy, in addition to telling stories behind the songs and life of the late singer. The sold-out show was performed consecutively over two weeks at the Atheneum Theatre in Melbourne.

In July 2011, Bowditch released the EP Are You Ready Yet?, which included the single "Now That You're Here" (with Lanie Lane).

In May 2012, Bowditch released the single, "You Make Me Happy", which was featured in the TV series Offspring. Bowditch plays Rosanna Harding in the series; a musician who produces and performs music with Billie's husband Mick, played by Eddie Perfect, creating marital jealousy and tension.

Bowditch's fifth studio album, The Winter I Chose Happiness, was released on 14 September 2012. The album peaked at number 11 on the ARIA Charts. At the ARIA Music Awards of 2013, the album was nominated for an award.

In 2013, Bowditch set up a creative social enterprise, Big Hearted Business (BHB).

The first Big Hearted Business conference was held in 2013 at the Abbotsford Convent in Melbourne, Australia. The speakers list of the event included comedian Catherine Deveny, writer Rachel Power and designer Lucy Feagins.

In October 2019, Bowditch released her first book, Your Own Kind of Girl, a partial memoir from her early life, published in Australian and New Zealand by Allen & Unwin, who acquired the rights after an auction between eight publishers.

In 2020, Bowditch released the Audible Original podcast series 'Tame Your Inner Critic'.

== Personal life ==
Bowditch and husband Marty Brown were introduced to each other via their bandmate John Hedigan in 1997. They have three children.

In December 2015, it was announced that Bowditch would be undertaking the role of program host for the afternoon radio program of ABC Radio Melbourne, starting on 25 January 2016. She presented her last programme on 29 November 2017, leaving to write what would go on to be her award-winning debut memoir ‘Your Own Kind of Girl’.

== Discography ==
=== Albums ===
Title	Details	Peak chart positions
Title	Details	AUS
Autumn Bone (credited to Clare Bowditch & The Feeding Set)	Released: 2003; Label: Storey Baker (CLABOW003)	-
What Was Left (credited to Clare Bowditch & The Feeding Set)	Released: October 2005; Label: Capitol, EMI (094634071826); Format: CD, DD	35
The Moon Looked On (credited to Clare Bowditch & The Feeding Set)	Released: October 2007; Label: Capitol, EMI (5093552); Format: CD, DD	29
Modern Day Addiction (credited to Clare Bowditch & The New Slang)	Released: August 2010; Label: Island Records (2745028); Format: CD, DD	10
The Winter I Chose Happiness	Released: 14 September 2012; Label: Story Baker, Island Records (3712256); Format: CD, DD	11

=== Extended plays ===
Title	Details
Are You Ready Yet?	Released: July 2011; Label: Island Records Australia (2776020); Format: CD, DD

=== Singles ===
Title	Year	Chart Positions	Album
Title	Year	AUS	Album
"Human Being" (Clare Bowditch & The Feeding Set)	2003	—	Autumn Bone
"Monday Comes" (Clare Bowditch & The Feeding Set)	2003	—	Autumn Bone
"Which Way to Go" (Clare Bowditch & The Feeding Set)	2004	—	What Was Left
"Divorcee by 23" (Clare Bowditch & The Feeding Set)	2005	—	What Was Left
"On This Side" (Clare Bowditch & The Feeding Set)	2005	84	What Was Left
"Little Self Centred Queen" (Clare Bowditch & The Feeding Set)	2006	—	What Was Left
"When The Lights Went Down" (Clare Bowditch & The Feeding Set)	2007	—	The Moon Looked On
"You Look So Good" (Clare Bowditch & The Feeding Set)	2008	—	The Moon Looked On
"The Start of War"	2009	—	
"Bigger Than Money"(Clare Bowditch and the New Slang)	2010	—	Modern Day Addiction
"Now That You're Here" (with Lanie Lane)	2011	—	Are You Ready Yet?
"You Make Me Happy"	2012	61	The Winter I Chose Happiness
"Sailing Alone" (with Charity Turner)	2013	—	non album single
"Woman"	2019	—	to be confirmed
"If I Could Give You"	2019	—	to be confirmed

== Other appearances ==
List of other non-single song appearances
Title	Year	Album
"Hallelujah"	2005	Triple J Like a Version
"Fall at Your Feet"	2005	She Will Have Her Way
"Blood Red Rose"	2007	Cannot Buy My Soul: A Kev Carmody Tribute
"Georgia's Song"	2011	ReWiggled - A Tribute to the Wiggles
"Black Smoke" (with Amanda Palmer and Jherek Bischoff)	2020	Amanda Palmer & Friends Present Forty-Five Degrees: Bushfire Flash Record

== Awards and nominations ==
=== APRA Awards ===
The APRA Awards are presented annually from 1982 by the Australasian Performing Right Association (APRA), "honouring composers and songwriters". They commenced in 1982.

Year	Nominee / work	Award	Result	Ref.
2013	"You Make Me Happy" (Clare Bowditch and Eddie Perfect)	Song of the Year	Shortlisted	

=== ARIA Music Awards ===
The ARIA Music Awards is an annual awards ceremony that recognises excellence, innovation, and achievement across all genres of Australian music. Bowditch has won one award from eight nominations.

Year	Nominee / work	Award	Result
2006	What Was Left	Best Female Artist	Won
2008	The Moon Looked On	Best Female Artist	Nominated
2008	The Moon Looked On	Best Adult Contemporary Album	Nominated
2010	Modern Day Addiction	Best Female Artist	Nominated
2010	Modern Day Addiction	Best Adult Alternative Album	Nominated
2010	Victor Van Vugt for Clare Bowditch - Modern Day Addiction	Engineer of the Year	Nominated
2011	Are You Ready Yet?	Best Female Artist	Nominated
2013	The Winter I Choose Happiness	Best Adult Contemporary Album	Nominated

=== EG Awards / Music Victoria Awards ===
The EG Awards (known as Music Victoria Awards since 2013) are an annual awards night celebrating Victorian music.

Year	Nominee / work	Award	Result
2009	Clare Bowditch	Best Female	Unknown
2011	Clare Bowditch	Best Female	Won
2012	The Winter I Chose Happiness	Best Album	Nominated
2012	Clare Bowditch	Best Female	Nominated

=== J Award ===
The J Award is an award given by Australian youth radio station Triple J to Australian Album of the Year. It is judged by the music and on-air teams at triple j, Unearthed and Double J.

Year	Nominee / work	Award	Result
2005	What Was Left	Australian Album of the Year	Nominated

=== Logie Awards ===
The Logie Awards (officially the TV Week Logie Awards) is an annual gathering to celebrate Australian television. Awards are presented in 20 categories representing both public and industry voted awards.

Year	Nominee / work	Award	Result
2013	Clare Bowditch in Offspring (Network Ten)	Most Popular New Female Talent	Nominated
