= Warp20 (Recreated) =

Compilation album of cover versions by various artists
- Released: 28 September 2009
- Length: 1:37:12
- Label: Warp Records

Professional ratings
Review scores
Source	Rating
Pitchfork Media	(8.4/10)
Pop Matters	(8/10)

Warp20 (Recreated) is a compilation album released by Warp Records in 2009. It contains covers of Warp artists, such as Aphex Twin, LFO, Boards of Canada and Grizzly Bear, by other Warp artists, such as Plaid, Autechre and Mira Calix. Warp20 (Recreated) was released as part of the Warp20 box set, released to commemorate the label's 20th anniversary.

== Track listing ==
Disc one
#	Artist	Title	Original artist	Original release	Length
1.	Born Ruffians	"Milkman / To Cure a Weakling Child"	Aphex Twin	Girl/Boy EP / Richard D. James Album (1996)	5:32
2.	Jimi Tenor	"Japanese Electronics"	Elecktroids	Elektroworld (1995)	5:26
3.	Maxïmo Park	"When"	Vincent Gallo	When (2001)	3:34
4.	Tim Exile	"A Little Bit More"	Jamie Lidell	Multiply (2005)	4:04
5.	Rustie	"Midnight Drive"	Elecktroids	Elektroworld (1995)	3:39
6.	Luke Vibert	"LFO"	LFO	Frequencies (1991)	5:48
7.	Autechre	"What Is House? (LFO Remix)"	LFO	What Is House? EP (1992)	4:26
8.	Russell Haswell	"Cabasa Cabasa"	Wild Planet	Blueprint (1993)	4:51
9.	Clark	"So Malleable"	Milanese	1Up (2004)	4:58
10.	Diamond Watch Wrists	"Fool in Rain"	Pivot	O Soundtrack My Heart (2008)	5:30
11.	Hudson Mohawke ft. Wednesday Nite	"Paint the Stars"	Jimi Tenor	Out of Nowhere (2000)	3:05
50:52

Disc two
#	Artist	Title	Original artist	Original release	Length
1.	Mark Pritchard	"3/4 Heart"	Balil	Black Dog Productions' Bytes (1993)	7:13
2.	Mira Calix with Oliver Coates	"In a Beautiful Place Out in the Country"	Boards of Canada	In a Beautiful Place Out in the Country EP (2000)	6:16
3.	Pivot	"Colorado"	Grizzly Bear	Yellow House (2006)	4:14
4.	Bibio	"Kaini Industries"	Boards of Canada	Music Has the Right to Children (1998)	3:41
5.	Jamie Lidell	"Little Brother"	Grizzly Bear	Yellow House (2006)	4:42
6.	Leila	"Vordhosbn"	Aphex Twin	Drukqs (2001)	5:01
7.	John Callaghan	"Phaylactery" (orig. "Tilapia")	Autechre	Cichlisuite EP (1997)	5:35
8.	Gravenhurst	"I Found the F"	Broadcast	Tender Buttons (2005)	3:27
9.	Plaid	"On My Bus"	Plone	For Beginner Piano (1999)	4:16
10.	Seefeel	"Acrobat"	Maxïmo Park	A Certain Trigger (2005)	4:03
48:29

The Japanese edition, released on Beat Records, includes the bonus track "Hey! Hey! Can U Relate?" by Nightmares on Wax (original by DJ Mink) on the second disc.
