= A House on a Street in a Town I'm From =

A House On A Street In A Town I'm From

Studio album by The Panics
- Released: 4 August 2003
- Recorded: August–September 2002
- Length: 54:55
- Label: LittleBIGMAN Records
- Producers: Steve Bond and The Panics

The Panics chronology
The Panics (EP 2) (2002)	A House On A Street In A Town I'm From (2003)	Crack in the Wall (2004)

A House on a Street in a Town I'm From is the debut studio album by Australian alternative rock band, The Panics. It was released in August 2003, on LittleBIGMAN Records. A number of the songs on this album are re-recorded after appearing on the band's two previous EPs.

The majority of the songs were recorded in Manchester during their 2002 tour. Laffer said "Well the studio we were in most of the time was this old bunker under a block of terraced houses and it was really old and dusty and we squeezed in and just tried our best to rock out. I thought back to the studios we'd bummed around in Perth and how people are always talking about the gear and how they want to upgrade to an international standard and they've got these pristine clean places. They're great I guess if you're making TV commercials but if you're capturing a song it's about standing around and playing it and getting that one take which is fantastic and you can't do that in those environments. That's why most of the records we did here we rented a house and just stood in the bedrooms and plugged in and we can't do it any other way. When you sing it's kind of easier if you've got a beer and if you want to have a cigarette while you're doing it, you don't want to be in some hospital atmosphere with the dollar signs clicking over in your head. That's one thing I hate about commercial studios but people get different results in different ways. Ours has been to take our time and do it with friends a lot of the time in our own space."

The woman who features on the album cover is lead singer Jae Laffer's grandmother. Laffer said "We just had a cool photo and we thought one day we'd just like to make that into a record cover... People will talk about our 'sun-drenched sound' and you know they've been looking at the covers which is fine but most importantly we wanted to have that really cool Australiana-type feel to it and be proud of that."

In May 2020, the album was re-released to streaming media. Laffer said "Listening to it now I hear big ideas, I hear the band sounding really great but I also hear myself regularly struggling on the microphone, my mind was often in another place and I hadn't yet learnt to relax into the moment, I just closed my eyes and whatever came out was what we went with. Still, that was very much an honest recording of where we were."

== Reception ==
The album was hailed as Album of the Year by several Triple J presenters and generated critical acclaim around Australia and internationally.

UK based music webzine, Drowned in Sound, in May 2003 stated "Jae Laffer sounds like a teenage Marc Bolan/David Bowie and guitarist Drew Wootton a deserved successor to John Square". UK Teletext stated The Panics were a "classical take on West Coast sunshine pop ala Byrds via Simon and Garfunkel and The Doves".

== Track listing ==
All tracks by Paul Otway, Jae Laffer, Myles Wootton, Drew Wootton and Julian Grigor.

1. "This Day Last Year" – 5:17
2. "Don't Be Kind" – 3:56
3. "How's It Feel" – 3:25
4. "Out Like a Light" – 5:20
5. "Kid You're a Dreamer" – 3:20
6. "Monkeys in the Hallway" – 1:56
7. "More Than You Wanted to Know" – 3:38
8. "My Brilliant Career" – 4:16
9. "(Happy Ending)" – 3:15
10. "Silence on the Street" – 3:56
11. "Give Me Some Good Luck" – 3:48
12. "Only a Thought" – 3:53
13. "Fire on the Hill" – 4:44
14. "I Give In" – 3:37

== Release history ==
Country	Date	Format	Label	Catalogue
Australia	August 2003	CD	littleBIGMAN	big3
Various	1 May 2020	streaming	littleBIGMAN	
