= The City of Light (Hilltop Hoods video) =

Video by Hilltop Hoods
- Released: 8 December 2007
- Genre: Australian hip hop
- Label: Obese

Hilltop Hoods chronology
The Calling Live (2005)	The City of Light (2007)	Parade of the Dead (2010)

The City of Light is the second DVD released by Australian hip-hop band Hilltop Hoods. It was released in December 2007 by Obese Records. The City Of Light, documents the making of the platinum certified The Hard Road and the 2007 ARIA award winning The Hard Road: Restrung albums and the touring undertaken by the group in promoting these albums, allowing an insight into the creative dynamic of the group. The City Of Light incorporates two hours of exclusive interviews and music videos, including extensive live and behind the scenes footage from the launch of the album The Hard Road: Restrung. This performance saw the Hilltop Hoods perform alongside the 31 piece Adelaide Symphony Orchestra to a full house at the Adelaide Entertainment Centre.

The City of Light was nominated for an ARIA in 2008 in the category of Best Music DVD.

== Track listing ==
The City of Light
No.	Title	Length
1.	"Intro"
2.	"The Road Begins"
3.	"X-Bred Studios"
4.	"Artwork"
5.	"Clown Prince"
6.	"Recording"
7.	"The Hard Road"
8.	"The Hard Road Video"
9.	"The Stopping All Stations Tour"
10.	"Circuit Breaker"
11.	"What a Great Night"
12.	"Audience with the Devil"
13.	"Recapturing the Vibe"
14.	"Restrung"
15.	"Mixing Restrung"
16.	"Launching Restrung"
17.	"Breathe"
18.	"Conversations from a Speakeasy"
19.	"Obese Lowlifes"
20.	"Roll On Up"
21.	"Credits"

== Certification ==
Region	Certification	Certified units/sales
Australia (ARIA)	Gold	7,500^{^}
^{^} Shipments figures based on certification alone.
