= Faker (band) =

Australian alternative rock band

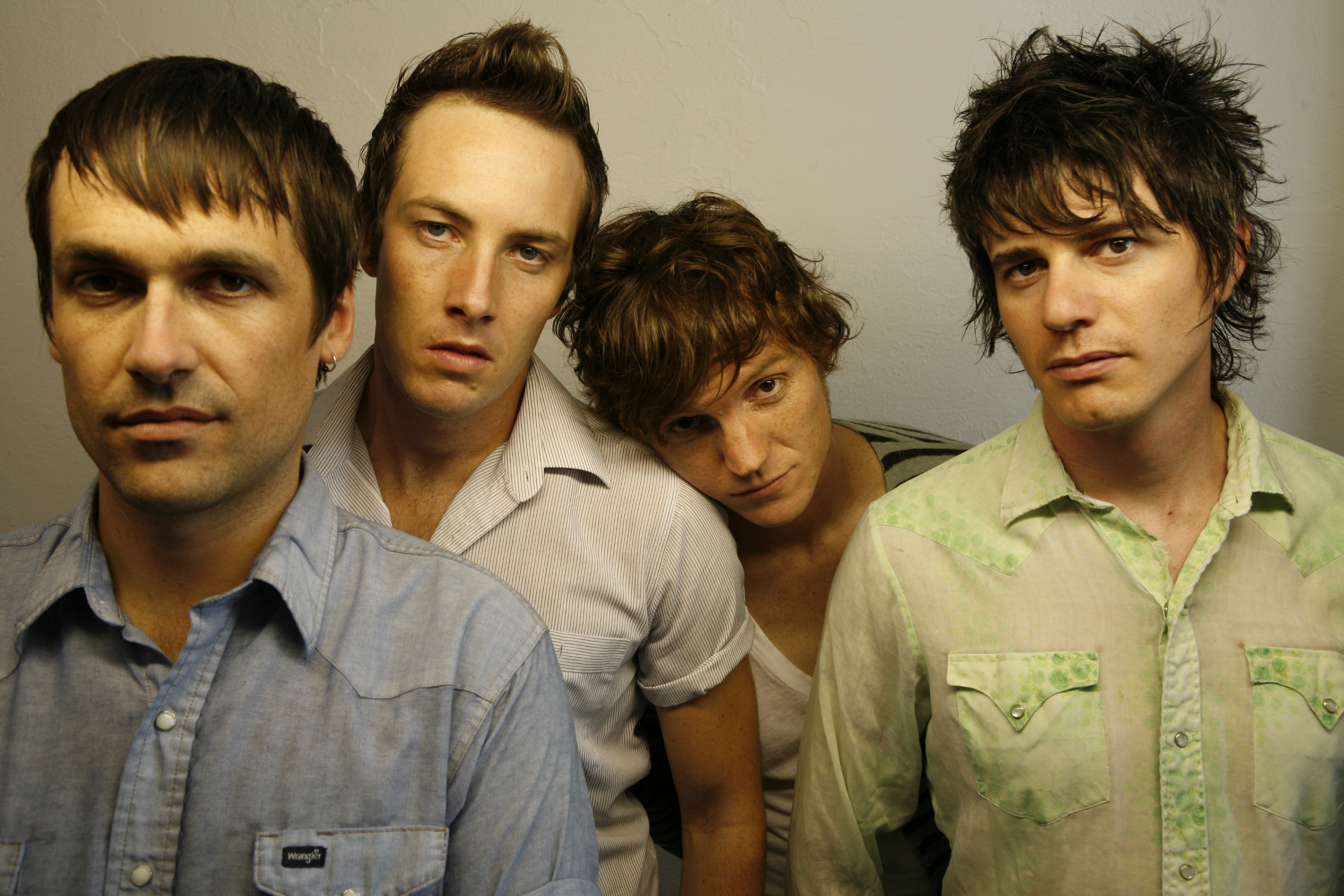

Background information
- Origin: Sydney, Australia
- Genres: Alternative rock; indie rock
- Years active: 1996–2013, 2020–present
- Labels: Wash/MGM; Capitol
- Members: Nathan Hudson
- Past members: See members section
- Website: Official website

Faker are an Australian alternative rock band, formed in 1996 by mainstay Nathan Hudson on lead vocals, piano and guitar. They have released four studio albums, Addicted Romantic (June 2005), Be the Twilight (November 2007), Get Loved (December 2011) and Enjoy Your Problems (September 2026). Their highest charting single, "This Heart Attack" (2007), peaked at No. 9 on the ARIA Singles Chart. The group disbanded in December 2013, but they announced their reformation in October 2020.

== History ==
=== 1996–2004: Formation and early releases ===
Faker were formed in Sydney in 1996 by Andrew Day on drums, Chris Deal on guitar, Nathan Hudson on lead vocals, guitar and piano, and Paul Youdell on bass guitar. They were joined by Marco Fraietta (p.k.a. Marco2000) on keyboards. The band spent five years performing gigs around Sydney. Their four-track debut extended play, Sound Out Loud, was released on 5 March 2001 via Wash Records/MGM Distribution with Greg Wales producing. Wash Records had been established by Hudson and the group's talent manager, Helen Chilman.

Marco2000 left Faker in 2000 after recording the EP, to relocate to France, while the band continued without a keyboardist. A single from the EP, "Teenage Werewolf", was placed on heavy rotation by Triple J and became a fan favourite. Another single, "Kids on Overload", followed in October 2001, which had Lindsay Stevenson on guitar. AllMusic's Chris True noted that "both [tracks] gained a fair amount of airplay on the radio network Triple J." Paul Berryman (ex-The Superjesus) replaced Day on drums late in 2003; Hudson described this as "the true beginning" for the band.

=== 2005–2006: Addicted Romantic ===
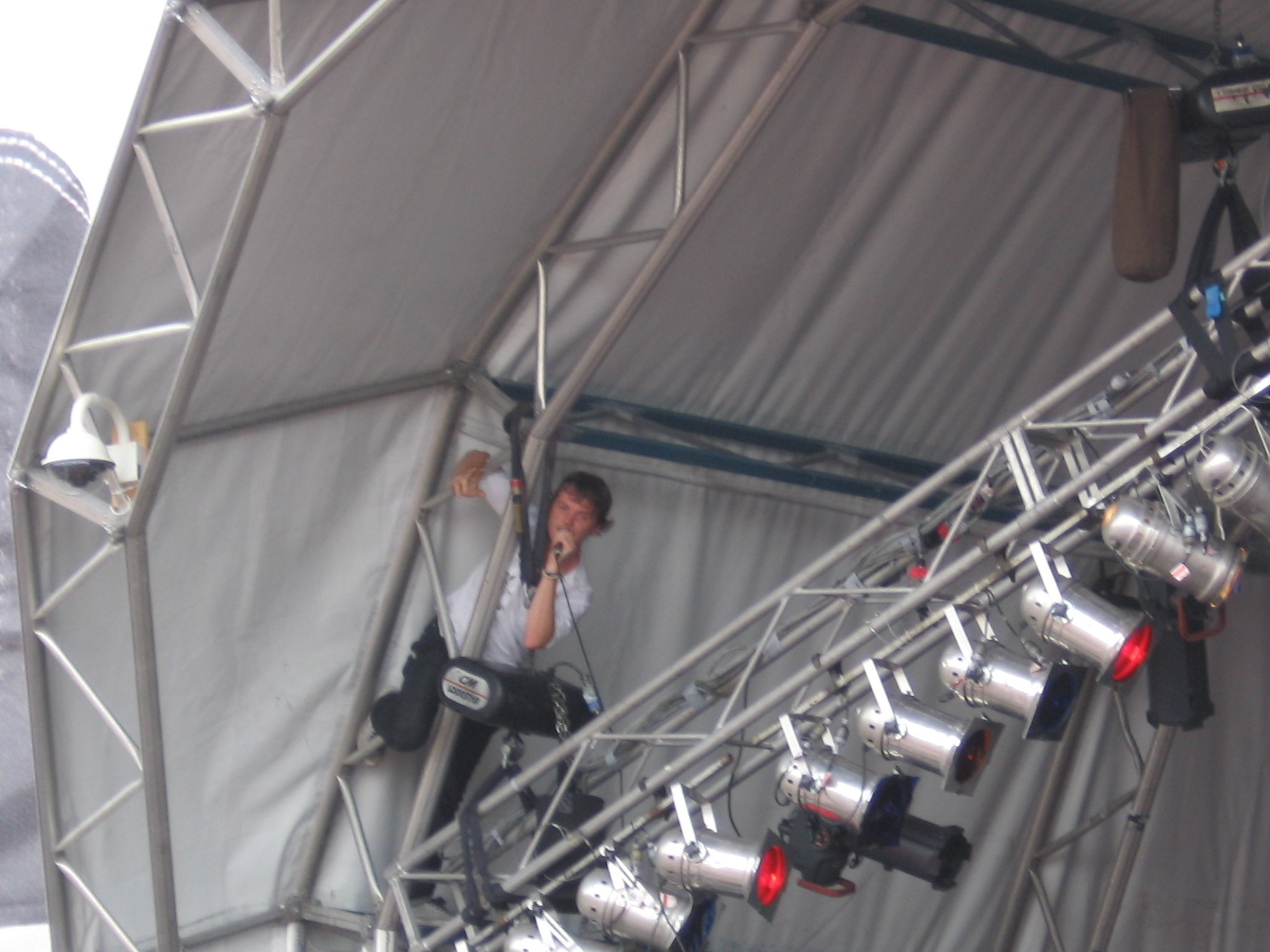
Faker at Big Day Out: Nathan Hudson singing "Hurricane" from the stage scaffolding, Sydney, January 2006.

They recorded their debut studio album, Addicted Romantic (June 2005), late in 2004 with Lindsay Gravina (Magic Dirt) producing at Birdland Studios, shortly after, they had signed to Capitol Records. It is laden with sexual motifs, with Hudson explaining, "The first track on the record is about casual sex and confusion through sex". Rather than treat sex as "wrapped up in cotton wool", the band intended to be open, upfront, and aggressive in their discussion of the topic. Long-term bass guitarist Paul Youdell and guitarist Jonathan Wilson left the band after the studio sessions, and were replaced by Nicholas Munnings and Stefan Gregory, respectively. In May 2005, ahead of the album, they issued a five-track EP, The Familiar / Enough EP via EMI and Capitol Records, which had two tracks with Wilson and Youdell and the rest with Gregory and Munnings.

The album peaked at No. 44 on the ARIA Albums Chart. Three singles were released from the album: "The Familiar" (May 2005), "Hurricane" (October), and "Love for Sale" (March 2006). "The Familiar" reached No. 62 on the ARIA Singles Chart, while "Hurricane" peaked at No. 65. "Hurricane" was listed at No. 21 on the Triple J Hottest 100, 2005. The video for Hurricane was recorded in the Domed Reading Room of the State Library of Victoria. Addicted Romantic was nominated for the inaugural J Award, although it was won by Wolfmother. In 2006, Phil Downing left the band, citing communication problems with other members. After that point, the band's line-up of Hudson, Berryman, Gregory and Munnings, remained unchanged, until Berryman left in March 2008. He was replaced by Lucio Pedrazzi.

=== 2007–2009: Be the Twilight ===
Faker's second album, Be the Twilight, was released on 17 November 2007. It peaked at No. 24 on the Australian ARIA Albums Chart. The first single from the album, "This Heart Attack", was released on 27 October 2007. The song peaked at No. 9 on the Australian ARIA Singles Chart, and it also reached No. 5 on the Triple J Hottest 100, 2007. The second single, "Are You Magnetic?", was released on 12 July 2008.

Be the Twilight was recorded in Los Angeles with producer Paul Fox (XTC, Björk, The Sugarcubes, They Might Be Giants). The band wrote 45 songs for the album before traveling to Los Angeles, where they trimmed this down to 12. The songs were influenced by the band's surroundings at the time of recording, with Hudson stating "[t]here's a whole directness that exists in L.A. and I kind of feel that we put that in the record". Hudson said that after "putting all the things you've ever experienced" into Addicted Romantic, the band were able to record Be the Twilight "more in the moment." Be the Twilight took its name from Hudson's fear of the dark; Faker insisted they "name the album after the twilight just to annoy him". Following the release of Be the Twilight, Faker embarked on an album tour, playing with fellow bands Children Collide and E.L.F. The tour commenced on 15 November 2007.

Critics generally responded well to Be the Twilight. Triple J rated it highly, stating the band "has made a record that will instantly please fans". Likewise, Webcuts Music awarded it 4.5 (out of five) saying "Faker are one of the few exciting and honest, heart-on-sleeve acts that exist in Australia. Be the Twilight is almost perfection". FHM saw it as "less annoying" than Addicted Romantic, and gave it 3 stars.

In 2008, the band appeared in major slots at a number of Australian outdoor festivals, and toured extensively.

In early 2009, the band joined Pink on the Australian Funhouse Tour dates.

=== 2010–2013: Get Loved and disbandment ===
The band released several demos via SoundCloud over the end of 2010 and announced on their Facebook page that the new album would be called Get Loved. On 25 May, the CSS remix of their new single "Dangerous" was released on SoundCloud via their Facebook page.

Intended for release in January 2012, the band decided to release Get Loved for free in December 2011 instead.

In 2013, frontman Nathan Hudson announced the band had broken up.

=== 2020–present: Reformation ===
In October 2020, Faker announced on their Facebook page that they would be reforming. In the spring of 2022, Hudson announced that he was working with Brazilian producer Adriano Cintra on a new album and played concerts dates in Melbourne and Sydney.

In July and August of 2025, Hudson toured Australia as a solo act under the moniker of Nate Faker.

In December 2025 the band - now consisting of Hudson, Munnings and the return of drummer Paul Berryman - released their first new song since 2011, "Comet". Alongside the release was news of their first album in almost 15 years, Enjoy Your Problems, which was released on 4 September 2026.

Faker toured in support of the album throughout the beginning of 2026, with the live lineup consisting of Nathan Hudson on lead vocals and guitar, Ben Fletcher and Tay Blunt both on guitar and backing vocals, Courtney Cunningham on bass and backing vocals and Tess Wilkin on drums.

== Members ==
Current members

- Nathan Hudson – lead vocals, guitar, piano (1996–2013, 2020–present)
- Nicholas Munnings – bass guitar (2004–2013, 2020-present)
- Paul Berryman – drums (2003–2008, 2020-present)

Current touring musicians

- Ben Fletcher – guitar, backing vocals (2022, 2026–present)
- Courtney Cunningham – bass, backing vocals (2022, 2026–present)
- Tay Blunt – guitar, backing vocals (2026–present)
- Tess Wilkin – drums (2026–present)

Former members

- Andrew Day – drums (1996–2003)
- Chris Deal – guitar (1996–2001)
- Paul Youdell – bass guitar (1996–2004)
- Marco Fraietta (p.k.a. Marco2000) – keyboards (1996–2000)
- Lindsay Stevenson – guitar (2001)
- Jonathan Wilson – guitar (2001–2004)
- Stefan Gregory – guitar (2004–2008)
- Philip Downing – guitar, backing vocals (2004–2006)

Former touring musicians

- B.K. Ayala
- Simon Barbetti
- Ben Blackhall
- Seamus Byrne
- Damien Cassidy
- Astrid Holz
- Evan Mannell
- Ash Moss
- Liam O'Brien
- Lucio Pedrazzi
- Mark Quince
- Flynn Scully
- Chris Stabback
- Daniel Wright

== Discography ==
=== Studio albums ===
List of studio albums, with selected details, chart positions and certifications
Title	Album details	Peak chart positions	Certifications
Title	Album details	AUS	Certifications
Addicted Romantic	Released: 13 June 2005; Label: Capitol; Format: CD, digital download	44	
Be the Twilight	Released: 17 November 2007; Label: Capitol; Format: CD, digital download	24	ARIA: Gold
Get Loved	Released: 2 December 2011; Label: Capitol; Format: Digital download	—	
Enjoy Your Problems	Released: 4 September 2026; Label: Mandatory Music; Format: Digital download	—	

=== EPs ===
List of EPs, with selected details
Title	EP details
Sound Out Loud	Released: 5 March 2001; Label: Wash; Format: CD
Kids on Overload	Released: 15 October 2001; Label: Wash; Format: CD
The Familiar/Enough EP	Released: 9 May 2005; Label: Capitol; Format: CD, digital download
How Did We Not Get Loved?	Released: 7 October 2011; Label: Capitol; Format: CD, digital download

=== Singles ===
List of singles, with selected chart positions and certifications
Title	Year	Peak chart positions		Certifications	Album
Title	Year	AUS	Triple J Hottest 100	Certifications	Album
"Teenage Werewolf"	2001	—	—		Sound Out Loud
"Kids on Overload"	2001	—	—		Kids on Overload
"Quarter to Three"	2004	—	—		Addicted Romantic
"The Familiar"/"Enough"	2005	62	—		Addicted Romantic
"Hurricane"	2005	65	21		Addicted Romantic
"Love for Sale"	2006	—	—		Addicted Romantic
"This Heart Attack"	2007	9	5	ARIA: Platinum	Be the Twilight
"Are You Magnetic?"	2008	—	—		Be the Twilight
"Sleepwalking"	2008	—	62		Be the Twilight
"Dangerous"	2011	—	—		Get Loved
"Comet"	2025	—	—		Enjoy Your Problem
"—" denotes singles that did not chart.

=== Music videos ===
Year	Song	Director(s)
2001	"Teenage Werewolf"	Chris Bamford
2002	"Kids on Overload"	
2004	"Quarter to Three"	
2005	"The Familiar"	
2005	"Hurricane"	
2006	"Love for Sale"	
2007	"This Heart Attack"	Stephen Lance and Damon Escott
2008	"Are You Magnetic?"	Dan Reisinger
2008	"Sleepwalking"	Luke Eve
2011	"Dangerous"	Luke Eve
2012	"Back When Solvents"	Joel De Sá

== Awards and nominations ==
=== APRA Awards ===
Year	Nominee / work	Award	Result	Ref.
2009	"This Heart Attack"	Most Played Australian Work	Won	

=== ARIA Music Awards ===
The ARIA Music Awards are a set of annual ceremonies presented by Australian Recording Industry Association (ARIA), which recognise excellence, innovation, and achievement across all genres of the music of Australia. They commenced in 1987.

Year	Nominee / work	Award	Result	Ref.
2008	Be the Twilight	Best Rock Album	Nominated	

=== J Award ===
The J Awards are an annual series of Australian music awards that were established by the Australian Broadcasting Corporation's youth-focused radio station Triple J. They commenced in 2005.

Year	Nominee / work	Award	Result
2005	Addicted Romantic	Australian Album of the Year	Nominated
