= J Award of 2005 =

Annual Australian music awards

- Date: 3 December 2005
- Venue: Australia
- Website: abc.net.au/triplej

The J Award of 2005 was the inaugural annual J Awards, established by the Australian Broadcasting Corporation's youth-focused radio station Triple J. The announcement came at the culmination of Ausmusic Month (November), on 3 December 2005. In 2005, there was only one category, Australian Album of the Year.

Wolfmother were awarded the inaugural J Award for their album Wolfmother.

== Background ==
As part of Triple J's 30th anniversary celebrations in 2005, the station inaugurated a single "J Award" to be given for "an album of outstanding achievement as an Australian musical work of art and for its creativity, innovation, musicianship and contribution to Australian music."

=== Who's eligible? ===
Any Australian album released independently or through a record company, or sent to Triple J in consideration for airplay, is eligible for the J Award. The 2005 nominations were selected from albums received by triple j between December 2004 and November 2005.

=== The criteria ===
The J Award is for an album of outstanding achievement as an Australian musical work of art - for its creativity, innovation, musicianship and contribution to Australian music. Fifteen nominations were announced throughout the year.

The J Award judging panel is headed by Triple J's Music Director Richard Kingsmill. The panel includes Robbie Buck from Triple J's flagship Australian music program Home and Hosed and other Triple J presenters, producers and live music engineers.

== Award ==
Australian Album of the Year

Artist	Album Title	Result
Wolfmother	Wolfmother	Won
Lior	Autumn Flow	Nominated
Downsyde	When the Dust Settles	Nominated
Ben Lee	Awake Is the New Sleep	Nominated
Cog	The New Normal	Nominated
Architecture in Helsinki	In Case We Die	Nominated
The Beautiful Girls	We're Already Gone	Nominated
The Drones	Wait Long By The River and the Bodies of Your Enemies Will Float By	Nominated
Faker	Addicted Romantic	Nominated
The Panics	Sleeps Like a Curse	Nominated
Gyroscope	Are You Involved?	Nominated
Pivot	Make Me Love You	Nominated
Clare Bowditch & the Feeding Set	What Was Left	Nominated
The Herd	The Sun Never Sets	Nominated
Bernard Fanning	Tea and Sympathy	Nominated
