= The Panics (EP 2) =

EP by The Panics
- Released: July 2002
- Recorded: March – May 2002
- Length: 17:20
- Label: littleBIGMAN Records
- Producer: Steve Bond, Sid Eaton, Rob Grant, Myles Wootton

The Panics chronology
The Panics (EP 1) (2002)	The Panics (2002)	A House on a Street in a Town I'm From (2003)

The Panics is the second EP by Australian band, The Panics. It was released in July 2002 by littleBIGMAN Records.

"This Day Last Year" was recorded by Steve Bond and Sid Eaton in April, 2002 at their home in Highgate, with the drums and bass recorded at Poons Head, Fremantle by Rob Grant. "How's It Feel" and "Ghost Song" were recorded and mixed by Sid Eaton on Monmouth Street, North Perth in May, 2002. "Mushroom Cloud" was recorded and mixed by Myles Wootton in March, 2002, and "The Way Home" was recorded by Steve Bond and Sid Eaton, with bass, drums and piano recorded by Rob Grant at Poons Head, Fremantle in May, 2002.

In April 2020, the EP was re-released to streaming media. Laffer said "I've just had a listen, again, probably not since we made it. I remember in these years we just kept recording, we had a great set up with dedicated friends Steve Bond and Sid Eaton always making themselves available, so we were always in someone's spare room, the whole band sat on someone's bed." Laffer added "I can hear myself trying way too hard at the microphone, but that was part of it at the time – big, nervous energy and ideas, which often worked and sometimes were a shambles."

== Track listing ==
All tracks by Paul Otway, Jae Laffer, Myles Wootton, Drew Wooton and Jules Douglas unless otherwise noted.

1. "This Day Last Year" - 4:39
2. "How's It Feel" (Jae Laffer, Drew Wootton, Myles Wootton, S Sieradzki) - 3:05
3. "Ghost Songs" - 3:36
4. "Mushroom Cloud" - 1:49
5. "The Way Home" - 4:09

== Personnel ==
- Jae Laffer - vocals, piano, guitar
- Paul Otway - bass
- Myles Wootton - drums, percussion, sampler
- Drew Wootton - guitars
- Jules Douglas - guitar, keys, backing vocals

== Release history ==
Country	Date	Format	Label	Catalogue
Australia	July 2002	CD	littleBIGMAN	little4
various	18 April 2020	streaming	littleBIGMAN	
