= Addicted Romantic =

Studio album by Faker
- Released: 13 June 2005
- Recorded: Birdland Studios, Melbourne
- Genre: Indie rock
- Label: Capitol
- Producer: Lindsay Gravina

Faker chronology
Addicted Romantic (2005)	Be the Twilight (2007)

Singles from Addicted Romantic
- 1. "Quarter to Three" Released: December 2004; 2. "The Familiar"/"Enough" Released: 9, May 2005; 3. "Hurricane" Released: 10 October 2005; 4. "Love for Sale" Released: 6 March 2006

Addicted Romantic is the debut studio album by Australian indie rock band Faker. Record label Capitol Records released the album on 13 June 2005. Four singles were released from the album; "Quarter to Three", "The Familiar"/"Enough", "Love for Sale", and "Hurricane". Of these, "Hurricane" was the most successful; it reached number 21 on the Triple J Hottest 100, 2005. The album spent one week on the ARIA Albums Chart at number 44, on 26 June 2005.

The album was recorded by Faker with Lindsay Gravina, of Magic Dirt fame, at Melbourne's Birdland Studios. The inspiration for "Enough", the first song written from the album, came to lead singer Nathan Hudson from a Patti Smith song in 1997. Eight years later, the band worked with Gravina to produce "the winning sound" on the album. He said the biggest challenge in recording was objectivity; choosing which songs to use, as well as improving their studio recording technique. Hudson told Australian Music Online that the band wanted people to "draw from their own experiences" when listening to Addicted Romantic, which they hoped contained music people would relate to. The Age's Andrew Murfett said the album was influenced by Joy Division, The Cure, The Smiths, and Echo & the Bunnymen, while Guy Blackman drew comparisons to Franz Ferdinand and Bloc Party.

Triple J's review of the album called it "a dapper slice of post-mod power pop". The Courier Mail said it featured "love-struck schoolboy lyrics and passion", and The Advertiser called it the best Australian album of 2005, praising "urgent vocals and angular guitars". Guy Blackman of The Age called the Hudson's vocals "unashamedly accented" but said it was "almost refreshing to hear an Australian sing in a thick British brogue rather than the usual faux-American twang".

At the J Award of 2005, the album was nominated for Australian Album of the Year.

Following the release of Addicted Romantic, Faker toured around Australia, supporting New York band The Bravery. The concert saw them "blow... [The Bravery] off stage" according to The Courier Mail's Patrick Lion.

== Track listing ==
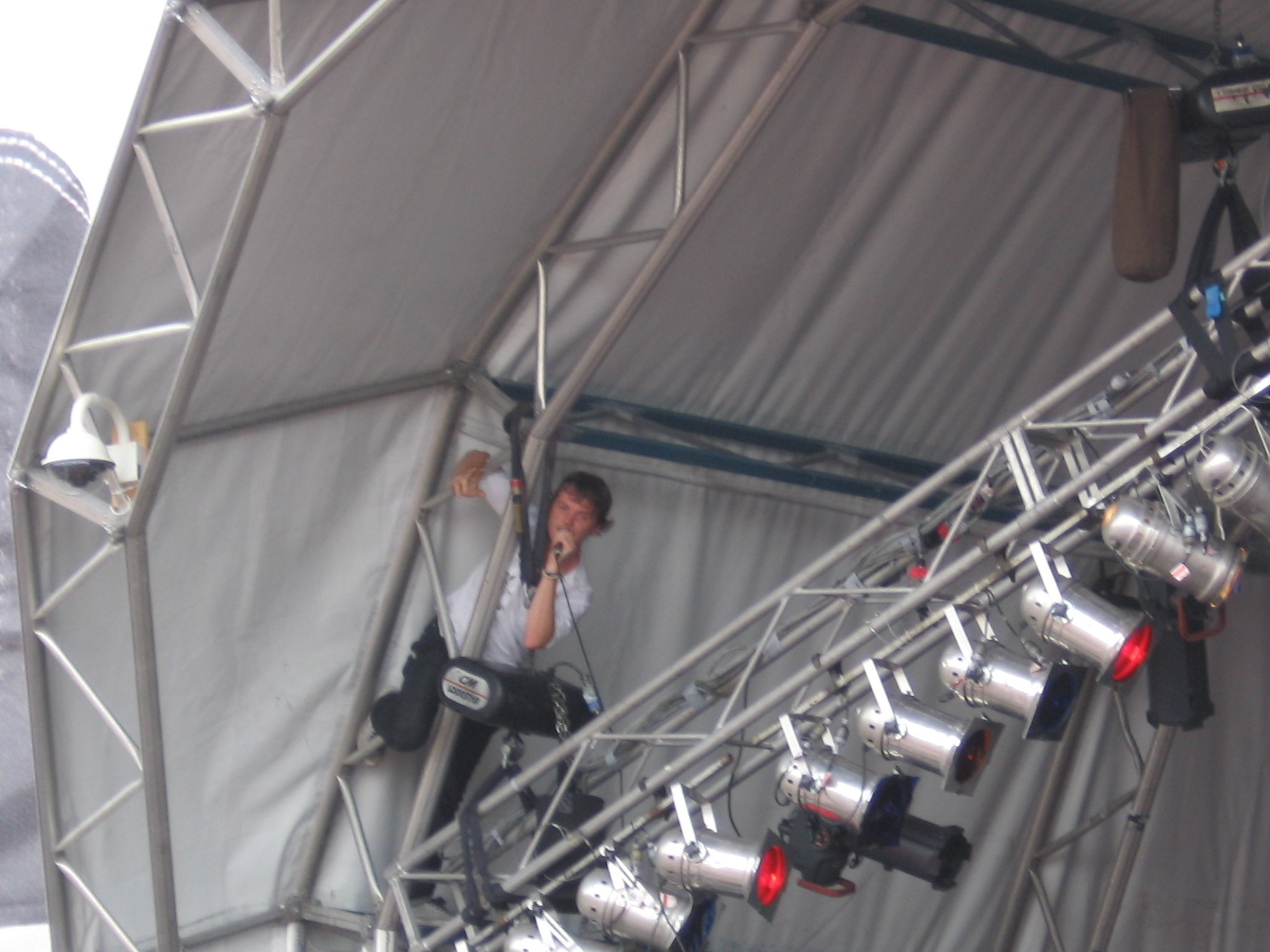
Hudson performing "Hurricane" from the scaffolding of the stage at the 2007 Big Day Out in Sydney

1. "Bodies"
2. "Quarter to Three"
3. "Love for Sale"
4. "Volumes"
5. "Kids on Overload"
6. "Fucking the Exhibits"
7. "Teenage Werewolf"
8. "Seizures"
9. "Hurricane"
10. "The Familiar"
11. "Enough"
12. "Ghosts"

== Personnel ==
- Nathan Hudson – vocals
- Phil Downing – guitar
- Nick Munnings – bass guitar
- Paul Berryman – drums
- Stefan Gregory – guitar

Additional personnel

- Lindsay Gravina – production
