= Hole in Your Pocket =

Studio album by The Panics
- Released: 7 October 2016
- Studio: Melbourne
- Genre: Pop rock
- Length: 42:29
- Label: Dew Process
- Producer: John O'Mahony; The Panics

The Panics chronology
| Rain on the Humming Wire (2011) | Hole in Your Pocket (2016) |

Singles from Hole in Your Pocket
- 1. "Weatherman" Released: August 2016; 2. "Hole in Your Pocket" Released: May 2017

Hole in Your Pocket is the fifth studio album by Australian indie rock band, The Panics. The album was released on 7 October 2016 by the label Dew Process. The album debuted and peaked at number 52 on the ARIA Chart.

The album was released four years after their previous with Jae Laffer saying "The cool thing about the album in one respect is that by having a few years off, it means the record has got a pretty good energy. It's relentless the whole time, so it's exciting to come back firing hard both in terms of purpose and meaning. I'm looking forward to communicating the songs to people."

Upon release, Jae Laffer spoke with Double J and said "The whole record seems to be about peoples' struggle and the compromises that you are met with in life."

== Reception ==
Professional ratings
Review scores
| Source | Rating |
|---|---|
| Rolling Stone | 4/5 stars |
| The Australian | 4.5/5 stars |

Darren Levin from Rolling Stone said "The Panics sound has grown more expansive over the years but they've never been this cinematic." Levin concluded the review saying "The Panics' uniquely Australian take on the widescreen rock just gets better with age." Andrew McMillen from The Australian said "Hole in Your Pocket is a gorgeous set of superbly crafted songs built on built on its distinctive brand of guitar-based pop".

Bronius Zumeris from the magazine Beat said "Now on their fifth album, The Panics have long passed the steep learning curve of a nascent nouveau band. The propulsive rhythms and Jae Leffers' voice define The Panics sound. Like 'Weatherman' and 'Passenger', the record as the sum of its parts is 'fragmented pop'. At times, it's exquisite and intricate music for the wee hours of the morning when much is revealed." Zumeris continued saying "There may not be any new tricks on show by the band, but why fix something that is not broken?"

Double J said "The Panics have yet again delivered a record with so much substance that we have to forgive them for taking so long to deliver it to us. Good things take time and we'll be getting plenty of years of joy from Hole in Your Pocket."

== Track listing ==
All tracks written by The Panics.

1. "Weatherman" – 5:18
2. "Hole in Your Pocket" – 4:11
3. "Passenger Side" – 4:03
4. "Carparks of Greschen" – 4:07
5. "Know My Name" – 6:30
6. "Not Apart, Not Together" – 4:30
7. "The Birds" – 4:05
8. "Loiter with Intent"
9. "Switching Off" – 5:23

== Charts ==
| Chart (2016) | Peak position |
|---|---|
| Australia (ARIA) | 52 |

== Release history ==
| Country | Date | Format | Label | Catalogue |
|---|---|---|---|---|
| Various | 7 October 2016 | CD, digital download, streaming | Dew Process | DEW9000879 |
