= What Was Left =

Studio album by Clare Bowditch & the Feeding Set
- Released: 2 October 2005
- Recorded: 2004–2005
- Studio: Standalone Studios, Melbourne
- Genre: Indie rock; folk
- Label: Capitol / EMI
- Producer: Martin W. Brown

Clare Bowditch & the Feeding Set chronology
Autumn Bone (2003)	What Was Left (2005)	The Moon Looked On (2007)

Singles from What Was Left
- 1. "Which Way to Go" Released: 2004; 2. "Divorcee by 23" Released: 2005; 3. "On This Side" Released: 2005; 4. "Little Self Centred Queen" Released: 2006

What Was Left is the second studio album by Clare Bowditch and the Feeding Set. It was released in October 2005 through Capitol.

At the J Award of 2005, the album was nominated for Australian Album of the Year.

At the ARIA Music Awards of 2006, Bowditch won the ARIA Award for Best Female Artist.

== Track listing ==
1. "Starry Picking Night" - 5:52
2. "Lips Like Oranges" - 3:57
3. "I Thought You Were God" - 4:30
4. "Winding Up" - 3:24
5. "Divorcee By 23" - 3:40
6. "Which Way to Go" - 4:10
7. "The Thing About Grief" - 4:44
8. "Strange Questions" - 6:15
9. "When I Was Five" - 4:32
10. "Little Self Centred Queen" - 3:01
11. "Just Might Do" - 4:04
12. "On This Side" - 4:03
13. "Yes I Miss You Like the Rain" - 2:09

Bonus Disc (Loose Acoustic One Takes)

1. "Good Grief" (Unreleased Track)
2. "Divorcee By 23"
3. "Empty Pockets" (Red Raku Number)
4. "Buddy" (From Autumn Bone)
5. "I Thought You Were God"

== Charts ==
Chart (2005)	Peak position
Australian Albums (ARIA)	35

== Release history ==
Region	Date	Format	Edition(s)	Label	Catalogue
Australia	October 2005	CD; digital download	Standard	Capitol Music	094634071826
Australia	October 2005	2xCD	Limited Edition	Capitol Music	094634072823

== Personnel ==
- Clare Bowditch – vocals
- Marty Brown (Art of Fighting) – drums
- J Walker (Machine Translations) – guitar
- Libby Chow – French horn, vocals
- Warren Bloomer – bass guitar
