= O Soundtrack My Heart =

Studio album by Pivot
- Released: 9 August 2008
- Genres: Math rock; electronic rock; post-rock
- Label: Warp
- Producer: Richard Pike

Pivot chronology
Make Me Love You (2005)	O Soundtrack My Heart (2008)	Church With No Magic (2010)

Professional ratings
Review scores
Source	Rating
BBC	favourable
The Dwarf	favourable
The Skinny	4/5 stars
Times Online	4/5 stars
The Vine	favourable

O Soundtrack My Heart is the second album by PVT (still under the band's original name, Pivot) and their first on Warp Records. It was released on 9 August 2008 in Australia, and 18 August in Europe.

The album was produced by Pivot in Sydney via London throughout 2006, tracked by Scott Horscroft, mixed by John McEntire in May 2007 and mastered by Noel Sommerville.

The album's cover art contains images by French artist Michel Granger, who was also responsible for the sleeve of Jean Michel Jarre's album Oxygène. Indeed, the sleeve of O Soundtrack My Heart bears a thematic similarity to the cover of Jarre's Oxygène 7–13 album.

In 2009 the song "Fool in Rain" was covered by Scott Herren's 'Diamond Watch Wrists' for the Warp20 (Recreated) compilation.

== Track listing ==
1. "October" – 1:52
2. "In the Blood" – 4:34
3. "O Soundtrack My Heart" – 5:40
4. "Fool in Rain" – 3:09
5. "Sing, You Sinners" – 3:38
6. "Sweet Memory" – 5:47
7. "Love Like I" – 4:54
8. "Didn't I Furious" – 3:30
9. "Epsilon" – 6:31
10. "Nothing Hurts Machine" – 4:58
11. "My Heart Like Marching Band" – 3:44
