= Scott Horscroft =

Australian music producer and sound engineer

- Born: 23 October 1977 (age 48); Australia
- Occupations: Record producer, musician, A&R
- Years active: 1989–present

Scott Horscroft (born 27 October 1977) is an Australian music producer/sound engineer, the owner of The Grove Studios and an Executive A&R Consultant for Universal Music Australia

== Career ==
In 1999 Horscroft completed a bachelor's degree of fine arts with honours, studying sculpture installation and performance art and electronic arts, at Sydney College of the Arts. In 2003, Horscroft released the experimental début album, 8 Guitars.

As a producer and engineer, Horscroft started out in the Surry Hills-based studio Big Jesus Burger (BJB) from 2003 to 2012. Joining EMI Music Australia in 2011 as Vice President of A&R, and then General Manager of A&R from 2013.

In 2013 he acquired The Grove Studios on the NSW Central Coast.

== Awards ==
At the 2008 ARIA Music Awards he received three nominations, 'Producer of the Year' for his work on The Panics' Cruel Guards, and two for 'Engineer of the Year' for Cruel Guards and The Presets' Apocalypso. In 2010 he received an ARIA nomination for 'Producer of the Year', jointly with Adam Spark, for Birds of Tokyo's self-titled third album. At the ARIA Music Awards in 2012 he was nominated for 'Engineer of the Year' for his work on 360's Falling & Flying. Horscroft also produced 2015 ARIA Award winning album by Melbourne's Oh Mercy, When We Talk About Love.

In 2023 Horscroft produced 2023 ARIA Award winning album by Dan Sultan, Dan Sultan.
