= The Moon Looked On =

Studio album by Claire Bowditch and the Feeding Set
- Released: 13 October 2007
- Recorded: September 2006–August 2007
- Venue: Standalone Studios, Adelphia Studios
- Label: Capitol/EMI
- Producer: Marty Brown

Clare Bowditch chronology
What Was Left (2005)	The Moon Looked On (2007)	Modern Day Addiction (2010)

Singles from The Moon Looked On
- 1. "When the Lights Went Down" Released: 2007; 2. "You Look So Good" Released: 2008

The Moon Looked On is the third studio album by Australian indie band, Clare Bowditch and the Feeding Set. It was released on 13 October 2007 by Capitol/EMI. It debuted and peaked at No. 29 on the ARIA Albums Chart. It was produced by Marty Brown, the group's drummer and Bowditch's husband.

A limited-edition double CD version was also released in 2007. The second disc, The Moon Looked On 2 – Campfire Versions, had all 12 tracks re-recorded by Bowditch as a solo artist.

At the ARIA Music Awards of 2008, the album was nominated for Best Adult Contemporary Album while Bowditch was nominated for Best Female Artist.

== Reception ==
Professional ratings
Review scores
Source	Rating
Time Off	link

== Track listing ==
1. "You Look So Good" - 4:08
2. "Peccadilloes" - 4:48
3. "Between the Tea and the Toast" - 3:42
4. "I Am Not Allowed" - 3:53
5. "When the Lights Went Down" - 3:22
6. "Little Black Cave" - 3:19
7. "This Bastard Disease" - 2:40
8. "I Love the Way You Talk" - 3:16
9. "That Wouldn't Be So Good" - 4:30
10. "Your Other Hand" - 3:40
11. "You Can Stay the Night" - 4:07
12. "People Like Me, People Like You" - 7:18

Bonus Disc Campfire Versions (Clare Bowditch Solo)

1. "Peccadilloes"
2. "Between the Tea and the Toast"
3. "I Am Not Allowed" (featuring Mick Turner on guitar)
4. "When the Lights Went Down"
5. "Little Black Cave"
6. "This Bastard Disease"
7. "I Love the Way You Talk"
8. "That Wouldn't Be So Good"
9. "Your Other Hand"
10. "You Can Stay the Night"
11. "People Like Me, People Like You"

== Charts ==
Chart (2005)	Peak position
Australian Albums (ARIA)	29

== Release history ==
Region	Date	Format	Edition(s)	Label	Catalogue
Australia	October 2007	CD; digital download	Standard	Capitol Music	5093562
Australia	October 2007	2xCD	Limited Edition	Capitol Music	5093552
