= The Calling Live =

Video by Hilltop Hoods
- Released: 2005
- Genre: Australian hip hop
- Label: Obese Records

Hilltop Hoods chronology
—	The Calling Live (2005)	The City of Light (2007)

The Calling Live is the first DVD to be released by the Australian hip hop group Hilltop Hoods. It was released in 2005, two years after their breakthrough album The Calling was released. The DVD sees the Hilltop Hoods performing these songs live at a concert the group gave in their hometown of Adelaide, at Thebarton Theatre on 20 November 2004. Along with the concert, the DVD also includes interviews with the group as well as rare footage. As with their albums, the DVD was distributed by Obese Records.

== Scene selection ==
1. "Intro"
2. "Dumb Enough"
3. "Touring"
4. "The Calling"
5. "The Beginning"
6. "Illusionary Lines"
7. "Obese Records"
8. "Testimonial Year"
9. "The Making of Breathe"
10. "The Sentinel"
11. "Aussie Hip Hop"
12. "Mic Felon"
13. "Digital Music"
14. "Laying Blame"
15. "Cactus Garden Special"
16. "The Nosebleed Section"
17. "New Album"
18. "Twilight"

== Trivia ==
The performance begins with what seems to be an early version of "Recapturing The Vibe", which appears on their 2006 album The Hard Road. "The Making of Breathe" sees the group taking you behind the scenes to show a song is made. The song also appeared on The Hard Road.

== Certification ==
Region	Certification	Certified units/sales
Australia (ARIA)	Gold	7,500^{^}
^{^} Shipments figures based on certification alone.
