= Are You Magnetic? =

Single by Faker

from the album Be the Twilight
- Released: 5 July 2008
- Recorded: 2007
- Genre: Indie rock
- Length: 12:06
- Label: EMI
- Songwriter: Nathan Hudson

Faker singles chronology
"This Heart Attack" (2007)	"Are You Magnetic?" (2008)	"Sleepwalking" (2008)

"Are You Magnetic?" is the second single from Faker's second studio album, Be the Twilight. Although it did not achieve the major chart success of "This Heart Attack", it was favored on channels and TV shows such as Channel V Hit Rater, MTV My Pix, and Network Ten Video Hits.

== Track listing ==
1. "Are You Magnetic?" (Radio edit)
2. "Sleepwalking" (Hong Kong Blonds Remix)
3. "Are You Magnetic?" (Paul Mac Remix)
