= Factory Girl (game show) =

- Promotional poster
- Also known as: Girls' Generation's Factory Girl
- Genre: Reality
- Written by: Kwon Se-young, Noh Soo-jeong, Choi Soo-jin
- Directed by: Kwon Young-chan
- Starring: Girls' Generation (intern)
- Judges: Nam Yoon-hee (chief), Ryoo Jee-yeon (editor), Jang Soo-young (editor), Kim Ah-reum (editor)
- Country of origin: South Korea
- Original language: Korean
- No. of seasons: 1
- No. of episodes: 10

Production
- Production locations: Seoul, South Korea, New York City, U.S.
- Camera setup: Multi-camera
- Running time: approx. 23 minutes per episode
- Production company: M.net Media

Original release
- Network: M.net
- Release: October 8 – December 17, 2008

Girls' Generation's Factory Girl (Korean: 소녀시대의 팩토리 걸) is a 2008 reality television show starring South Korean girl group Girls' Generation. The show revolves around the members of the group working as intern editors at Elle Girl Korea. The concept of the show was inspired by the 2006 Hollywood movie The Devil Wears Prada.

== Background ==
Factory Girl is the Korean reality version of the movie The Devil Wears Prada, with the nine members of Girls' Generation taking on the role of fashion editors for a magazine aimed at teenagers and young adults. The director, Kim Young-chan stated that Factory Girl is "a program combining reality, trends and celebrity". The program premiered on October 8, 2008 at 6PM. The editor of Elle Girl Korea, Nam Yoon-hee, as well as other faculty, frequently appeared on the show to give the Girls' Generation members assignments and guidance.

== Cast ==
The Girls' Generation members were instructed to write resumes before filming of the show began, which were later used to promote the show and posted up on the official website. The editor Nam Yoon-hee as well as one of Girls' Generation's managers then traveled to the members' shared apartment to rate the individual members' fashion senses. Yoona was filmed in secret while working at the set for her drama You Are My Destiny and Sunny was filmed in secret while out shopping with a friend, while Taeyeon was filmed with help from Kang-in of Super Junior with whom she co-hosted MBC FM Chinhan Chingu radio show at the time. The editor noted, "On the whole, Girls' Generation has a good personal fashion sense", adding "they send a message that you can fully follow fashion trends if you just express your individual personality".

The members of Girls' Generation eventually split into two groups to compete when doing assignments, with Taeyeon, Jessica, Sunny, Yuri and Yoona in the 'A' team and with Tiffany, Hyoyeon, Sooyoung and Seohyun in the 'B' team. In a playful discussion at the end of the first episode, the members later rename the 'A' and 'B' teams 'Candy Girls' and 'Dream Girls' respectively.

== See also ==
- 2007 M.net Girls' Generation Goes to School
- 2009 M.net Kara Bakery
- 2010 M.net T-ara's Dreamgirls
