= Make Me Love You (album) =

Studio album by Pivot
- Released: 8 August 2005
- Recorded: 2003–2005
- Genre: Math rock
- Length: 50:25
- Label: Sensory Projects/Inertia
- Producer: Richard Pike

Pivot chronology
Make Me Love You (2005)	O Soundtrack My Heart (2008)

Make Me Love You is the debut album by Australian instrumental band Pivot (now PVT). It was released on 8 August 2005 through Sensory Projects and distributed by Inertia Distribution. It received strong radio support (particularly the track "Montecore") and a nomination for the J Award, or Australian Album of the Year, by national radio station Triple J. The album was produced by the group's Richard Pike, mixed by Richard Belkner, and mastered by William Bowden. One notable sample from the album is the use of the violin from Nikolai Rimsky-Korsakov's 1888 piece Scheherazade on the second track of the album, "Artificial Horizon". In October 2015 PVT re-issued Make Me Love You in a vinyl format with a bonus CD, You Make Me Love - B-Sides & Demos 2003-2005, of material from the original recording sessions. They followed with two Australian shows to promote this release in November.

At the J Award of 2005, the album was nominated for Australian Album of the Year.

== Reception ==
Professional ratings
Review scores
Source	Rating
Stylus Magazine	(B)

Stylus Magazine's Matthew Levinson felt that "the images evoked by Pivot's music are impossible to ignore. I can almost see it on the movie screen: sick-in-the-head lead character who you've come to understand, even like, but he's spiralling out of control, hitting out and desperate for understanding." A Triple J staff writer opined that "while being their first album, its mastery reveals six years of the band playing together." It was nominated for Australian Album of the Year, or the J Award, for 2005. Jody Macgregor of AllMusic noticed that the group were a "Dark experimental instrumental post-rock band" and that "Their first album took roughly three years from the start of recording to its release, partly due to the band's perfectionism but presumably also because of the number of side projects they were participating in." Dale Harrison of Cyclic Defrost felt that it "emerged as a cute and cuddly set of songs that surprise in their innocent wide-eyed stare as well as challenge with their unsullied-by-experience observations... The pieces themselves are elegantly played out to their conclusions, and manage to be multilayered without being overly complex or fiddly, and even rarer is the wonderfully melodic sensibilities of each of the players and their ability to intertwine like a finely wrought tapestry."

== Track listing ==
1. "Make Me Love You" - 3:32
2. "Artificial Horizon" - 4:13
3. "Incidental Backcloth" - 7:07
4. "Montecore" - 4:46
5. "La Mer" - 5:30
6. "Pivot Voltron" - 7:57
7. "I May Be Gone for Some Time" - 3:45
8. "Kirsten Dunst" - 7:16
9. "Helps None but Hurts None" - 6:15

== Personnel ==
=== Pivot members ===
- Richard Pike – guitars, producer
- Laurenz Pike – drums, percussion
- Adrian Klumpes – keyboards
- Neal Sutherland – bass guitar
- Dave Bowman – turntablism

=== Recording ===
- Producer – Richard Pike
- Mixer – Richard Belkner
- Mastering – William Bowden
