= Factory Bot (Rails Testing) =

Factory Bot, originally known as Factory Girl, is a software library for the Ruby programming language that provides factory methods to create test fixtures for automated software testing. The fixture objects can be created on the fly; they may be plain Ruby objects with a predefined state, ORM objects with existing database records or mock objects.

Factory Bot is often used in testing Ruby on Rails applications; where it replaces Rails' built-in fixture mechanism. Rails' default setup uses a pre-populated database as test fixtures, which are global for the complete test suite. Factory Bot, on the other hand, allows developers to define a different setup for each test and thus helps to avoid dependencies within the test suite.

== Factories ==
=== Defining Factories ===
A factory is defined by a name and its set of attributes. The class of the test object is either determined through the name of the factory or set explicitly.

FactoryBot.define do
  # Determine class automatically
  factory :user do
    name { "Captain Minion" }
    superhero { false }
  end
  
  # Specify class explicitly
  factory :superhero, class: User do
    name { "Tony Stark" }
    superhero { true }
  end
end

== Features ==
=== Traits ===
Traits allow grouping of attributes which can be applied to any factory.

factory :status do 
  title { "Seeking for Full Time jobs" }
 
  trait :international do
    international { true }
  end
 
  trait :resident do
    international { false }
  end
 
  trait :comp_sci do
    comp_sci { true }
  end
 
  trait :electrical do
    comp_sci { false }
  end
 	
  factory :comp_sci_international_student,  traits: [:international, :comp_sci]
  factory :electrical_resident_student,  traits: [:resident, :electrical]
end

=== Alias ===
Factory Bot allows creating aliases for existing factories so that the factories can be reused.

factory :user, aliases: [:student, :teacher] do
  first_name { "John" }
end
 
factory :notice do
  teacher
  # Alias used ''teacher'' for ''user''
  title { "Office Hours" }
 end
 
factory :notification do
  student
  #Alias used student for user 
  title { "Lecture timings" }
end

=== Sequences ===
Factory Bot allows creating unique values for a test attribute in a given format.

FactoryBot.define do
  factory :title do
    sequence(:name) {|n| "Title #{n}" }
    # Title 1, Title 2 and so on...
  end
end

=== Inheritance ===
Factories can be inherited while creating a factory for a class. This allows the user to reuse common attributes from parent factories and avoid writing duplicate code for duplicate attributes. Factories can be written in a nested fashion to leverage inheritance.

factory :user do
  name { "Micheal" }

  factory :admin do
    admin_rights true
  end
end

admin_user = create(:admin)
admin_user.name   # Micheal
admin_user.admin_rights   # true

Parent factories can also be specified explicitly.

factory :user do
  name { "Micheal" }
end

factory :admin, parent: :user do
  admin_user { true }
end

=== Callback ===
Factory Bot allows custom code to be injected at four different stages:

after(:build)
Code can be injected after the factory is built
before(:create)
Code can be injected before the factory is saved
after(:create)
Code can be injected after the factory is saved
after(:stub)
Code can be injected before the factory is stubbed

== See also ==
=== Other Test libraries for Ruby ===
- NullDB: a way to speed up testing by avoiding database use.
- Fixture Builder: a tool that compiles Ruby factories into fixtures before a test run.
- Shoulda: an extension to test/unit with additional helpers, macros, and assertions.
- Rspec: a behavior-driven development framework
- Capybara: Acceptance test framework for web applications.
