= This Heart Attack =

Single by Faker

from the album Be the Twilight
- Released: 13 October 2007
- Genre: Indie rock
- Length: 3:47
- Label: EMI
- Songwriter(s): Nathan Hudson
- Producer(s): Paul Fox

Faker singles chronology
"Love for Sale" (2006)	"This Heart Attack" (2007)	"Are You Magnetic?" (2008)

"This Heart Attack" is the first single from Faker's second album Be the Twilight. It was released digitally on 13 October 2007 and physically on 27 October 2007. The track was voted in at number five in Triple J's Hottest 100 2007 competition.

A remix of "This Heart Attack" by Miami Horror appeared on the Ministry of Sound Clubber's Guide to 2008.

Hamish & Andy performed a parody of the song, titled "The Last Line Was Crap" to Faker while they were on their radio show.

== Music video ==
The video for "This Heart Attack" was directed by Stephen Lance and Damon Escott for Head Pictures, and produced by Leanne Tonkes. The video's editor was Haley Stibbard.

== Track listing ==
1. "This Heart Attack" – 3:49
2. "Deathwish" – 2:51
3. "Alex" – 1:45

== Charts ==
Despite being released in October, the single didn't hit the ARIA singles chart until 27 January 2008 debuting at #48. It remained in the bottom end of the chart until April 2008, when commercial radio noticed the track and started adding it to playlists. "This Heart Attack" surged into the top 20, and on 14 April achieved its highest position so far, breaking into the top ten at No..9. It was in the charts for a total of 27 weeks (more than half a year).

=== Weekly charts ===
Chart (2008)	Peak position
Australia (ARIA)	9

=== Year-end charts ===
Chart (2008)	Position
Australia (ARIA)	46

== Awards and nominations ==
=== APRA Award ===
- 2009 Most Played Australian Work win.
