= Be the Twilight =

Studio album by Faker
- Released: 17 November 2007
- Recorded: 2007; Los Angeles, USA
- Genre: Indie rock
- Label: EMI
- Producer: Paul Fox

Faker chronology
Addicted Romantic (2005)	Be the Twilight (2007)	Get Loved (2011)

Singles from Be the Twilight
- 1. "This Heart Attack" Released: 13 October 2007; 2. "Are You Magnetic?" Released: 5 July 2008; 3. "Sleepwalking" Released: 11 October 2008

Be the Twilight is the second album released by Sydney-based Australian band Faker. It was released on 17 November 2007. "This Heart Attack" was the first single off the album, it was released on 13 October 2007. The album debuted at #37 on the Australian ARIA Albums Chart and has thus far peaked at #24.

== Track listing ==
1. "This Heart Attack" – 3:47
2. "Are You Magnetic?" – 3:50
3. "Killer on the Loose" – 3:57
4. "Sleepwalking" – 5:01
5. "Lazy Bones" – 3:59
6. "Voodoo Economics" – 3:56
7. "Kid, Please Try Harder" – 5:31
8. "Don't Hide" – 3:17
9. "Lost & Found" – 3:25
10. "Dumb Mistakes" – 3:33
11. "Radio Lies" – 4:00
12. "Death Beach Party" – 3:37
13. "Hit the Light" – 3:12 iTunes bonus track

=== Enter the Twilight Bonus Disc (Re-release) ===
1. "Sleepwalking" (Acoustic) – 5:04
2. "Pet Sematary" (Acoustic) (Like a Version Performance) – 3:17
3. "This Heart Attack" (Acoustic) – 3:54
4. "Are You Magnetic?" (Acoustic) – 3:51
5. "Deathwish" (Acoustic) – 2:48
6. "This Heart Attack" (Miami Horror Remix) – 5:58
7. "Sleepwalking" (Hong Kong Blondes Remix) (Edit) – 4:39
8. "Are You Magnetic?" (Paul Mac Remix) – 4:51
9. "This Heart Attack" (Grafton Primary Remix) (Edit) – 4:04
10. "Sleepwalking" (Clubfeet Remix) – 4:44
