= Michelle Gallen =

Irish novelist

- Born: County Tyrone
- Occupation: Writer
- Education: Trinity College, Dublin; University of Stirling

Website
- www.michellegallen.com

Michelle Gallen is an Irish novelist who has written fictionalised accounts of The Troubles in her comedy novels, based on her upbringing in Castlederg, near the border between Northern Ireland and the Republic of Ireland. She has stated that she wants to shine a light on this experience's impact on families and communities.

She was shortlisted for the Costa Book Award for First Novel for Big Girl, Small Town. The audiobook version was narrated by actress Nicola Coughlan. She won the Comedy Women in Print Prize for her second novel Factory Girls.

== Bibliography ==
=== Novels ===
- —— (2021). Big Girl, Small Town. John Murray. ISBN 9781529304220.
- —— (2023). Factory Girls. John Murray. ISBN 9781529386288.
