= Factory Girl (Rolling Stones song) =

Song by the Rolling Stones

from the album Beggars Banquet
- Released: 6 December 1968
- Genre: Folk rock
- Length: 2:08
- Label: ABKCO
- Songwriter: Jagger/Richards
- Producer: Jimmy Miller

"Factory Girl" is a song by the Rolling Stones which appears on their 1968 album Beggars Banquet.

It is very similar to an Appalachian folk tune, especially due to its minimal arrangement, featuring Mick Jagger on vocals, Keith Richards on acoustic guitar, Rocky Dijon on conga drums, Ric Grech of Family on fiddle/violin, Dave Mason on mandolin and Charlie Watts on tabla.

On his performance, Watts said in 2003, "On 'Factory Girl', I was doing something you shouldn't do, which is playing the tabla with sticks instead of trying to get that sound using your hand, which Indian tabla players do, though it's an extremely difficult technique and painful if you're not trained."

The song is composed of lyrics musing on the singer's relationship with a young woman, all while he is waiting for her to come out to meet him;

Waiting for a girl who's got curlers in her hair
Waiting for a girl, she has no money anywhere
We get buses everywhere, waiting for a factory girl

Richards said of the song in 2003, "To me 'Factory Girl' felt something like 'Molly Malone', an Irish jig; one of those ancient Celtic things that emerge from time to time, or an Appalachian song. In those days I would just come up and play something, sitting around the room. I still do that today. If Mick gets interested I'll carry on working on it; if he doesn't look interested, I'll drop it, leave it and say, 'I'll work on it and maybe introduce it later.'"

Jagger countered, saying, "The country songs, like 'Factory Girl' or 'Dear Doctor' on Beggars Banquet were really pastiche. There's a sense of humour in country music anyway, a way of looking at life in a humorous kind of way - and I think we were just acknowledging that element of the music. The 'country' songs we recorded later, like "Dead Flowers" on Sticky Fingers or "Far Away Eyes" on Some Girls are slightly different. The actual music is played completely straight, but it's me who's not going legit with the whole thing, because I think I'm a blues singer not a country singer."

Jim Beviglia ranked "Factory Girl" the 163rd best Rolling Stones song in Counting Down the Rolling Stones: Their 100 Finest Songs. Paste commented, "The Rolling Stones did an impressive job stepping outside their usual rockers to create this folk number" and ranked it 29th in its Top 50 Rolling Stones songs. Rolling Stone ranked it 91st in its countdown of the band's top 100 songs, calling it an "oddity that feels like a country song yet incorporates tablas, mandolins and a fiddle solo."

The song has been performed live in 1990, 1997 and 2013. A live recording from the Steel Wheels/Urban Jungle Tour made its way onto the 1991 live album Flashpoint. The song was also featured during the 1997 Bridges to Babylon Tour It was played in Los Angeles on 3 May 2013 and then a version of the song with different lyrics called "Glastonbury Girl" was performed at the Glastonbury festival on 29 June 2013.

== Personnel ==
Sources:

- Mick Jagger – vocals
- Keith Richards – acoustic guitar
- Charlie Watts – tabla
- Rocky Dijon – conga drum
- Ric Grech – violin

== See also ==
- Factory Girl (disambiguation)
