= Jae Laffer =

Australian singer-songwriter

- Born: Justin Laffer; Australia
- Occupations: Musician; singer; songwriter
- Instrument: vocals
- Years active: 2000–present
- Labels: Dew Process, Universal Music Australia, EMI Music

Justin Laffer, known professionally as Jae Laffer is an Australian rock singer-songwriter and writer. He is the lead singer of West Australian-based rock band The Panics.

== Career ==
=== 2000–present: The Panics ===
In 2000, Laffer and Drew Wootton formed the band, The Panics with Myles Wootton, Paul Otway and Jules Douglas. The Panics released 5 critically acclaimed studio albums and 3 EPs. In 2008 the band's Cruel Guards album won an ARIA Award and was certified gold.

=== 2013–present: Solo career ===
In 2013, Laffer released his debut solo album When the Iron Glows Red, featuring the singles "Leave a Light On", "Leaving on Time" and "Right Above My Heart". The Australian's Andrew McMillen gave the album a 4.5 star review and said "It's a potent chain of 10 tracks without a single weak link". Laffer supported the album with a solo tour.

In June 2020, Laffer released his second solo album, The Long Daydream, featuring the singles "Hotel Motel", "I Can't Make Up Your Mind" and "Some Boys Never Learn". On making the album, Laffer said "The songs celebrate simple stages and events in my life. I learnt to record and cherished the first takes of most of the music I was making in an effort to keep the spirit of the moment and capture the performance – myself on guitar and keyboards with Alex Markwell from Delta Riggs playing drums and bass and Rowena Wise on additional vocals". Dan Condon from Double J gave the album a positive review saying "The Long Daydream's warm familiarity makes it a pleasant way to spend half an hour".

== Discography ==
=== Studio albums ===
List of studio albums, with selected details
| Title | Album details |
|---|---|
| When the Iron Glows Red | Released: 27 September 2013; Label: Dew Process (DEW9000622); Format: CD, DD |
| The Long Daydream | Released: 19 June 2020; Label: LittleBigMan / EMI (LBM22); Format: CD, DD, Streaming, LP |

=== Singles ===
| Year | Title | Album |
|---|---|---|
| 2013 | "Leave a Light On" | When the Iron Glows Red |
| 2013 | "Leaving On Time" | When the Iron Glows Red |
| 2014 | "Right Above My Heart" | When the Iron Glows Red |
| 2019 | "Hotel Motel" | The Long Daydream |
| 2020 | "I Can't Make Up Your Mind " | The Long Daydream |
| 2020 | "Some Boys Never Learn" | The Long Daydream |
