= The Polyester Embassy =

Studio album by Madison Avenue
- Released: 2 October 2000
- Genre: House
- Length: 63:53
- Labels: Vicious Grooves; C2Records
- Producers: Andy Van Dorsselaer; Cheyne Coates

Singles from The Polyester Embassy
- 1. "Don't Call Me Baby" Released: 18 October 1999; 2. "Who the Hell Are You" Released: 5 June 2000; 3. "Everything You Need" Released: 18 September 2000; 4. "Reminiscing" Released: 5 March 2001

The Polyester Embassy is the only album by Australian band Madison Avenue, released in Australia on 2 October 2000 by Vicious Grooves.

== Background ==
Before joining Madison Avenue, Cheyne Coates was working as a choreographer and singer in Melbourne. Coates met producer and writer Andy Van Dorsselaer (aka Andy Van) in a dance club. Van was the founder of the Vicious Vinyl record label and had remix credits for Tina Arena and CDB. Van Dorsselaer had won an ARIA Award for his production work on "Coma" by Pendulum.

The duo started working together mainly as writers and producers in 1998. Madison Avenue recorded their first song, "Fly", featuring Kellie Wolfgram as the vocalist. However, Coates sang on the group's breakthrough single "Don't Call Me Baby", as Van Dorsselaer preferred her version, even though the song was initially used as the guide track for Wolfgram.

The duo continued to work on their debut album through 2000, which was eventually released on 2 October 2000, eleven months after "Don't Call Me Baby". Coates spoke out about her time in the band and the process of making The Polyester Embassy, as well as their unreleased second album, after the band's split in 2003, saying that the duo was poorly organised and late in delivering material, blaming it on them being quickly thrust into the spotlight after the success of "Don't Call Me Baby".

"I think the problem was that no one was in control, it was just a mess. We were always on the back foot, we were always late in delivering everything. When it's your first time around, you don't have a clue. But it was a good learning curve. We didn't even have a manager in the beginning so we were dealing with record companies ourselves, which is a bad idea."

== Singles ==
- "Don't Call Me Baby" was released on 18 October 1999. It quickly rose to number 2 in the Australian charts, where it remained for six non-consecutive weeks, held off the top spot by "Blue (Da Ba Dee)" by Eiffel 65. It was eventually certified 3× Platinum. The song was also a success internationally, in the UK it debuted at number 1 and was certified Silver, and was performed on Top of the Pops. In the US, the song reached number 88 on the Billboard Hot 100, and number 1 on the Billboard Dance Club Songs chart.
- "Who the Hell Are You" was released on 5 June 2000 as the second single. It debuted atop the singles chart in Australia, where it stayed for two consecutive weeks, and was certified Platinum. Internationally, the song failed to match the success of "Don't Call Me Baby"; in the UK the song debuted and peaked at number 10 and remained in the top 40 for 3 weeks, and in the US the song reached number 1 on the Billboard Hot Dance Club Songs, but failed to appear on the Hot 100.
- "Everything You Need" was released as the third single on 18 September 2000. It peaked at number 6 in Australia where it was certified Gold. In the UK, the song peaked at number 33.

A fourth single was released by the band, a cover of "Reminiscing", originally by Little River Band. The song was included only on the Japanese edition of the album, therefore elsewhere it was a single-only release. In Australia, the song was released on 5 March 2001 and continued the band's top 10 streak, peaking at number 9 and achieving Gold certification.

== Critical reception ==
Professional ratings
Review scores
Source	Rating
AllMusic	2.5/5 stars

Tim Sheridan from AllMusic gave the album an average review, saying "While it offers some decent dance grooves, this slick production does little more than rehash disco clichés without the sense of fun applied by bands like Deee-lite. Perhaps if the duo of Cheyne Coates and Andy Van didn't take itself so seriously, the project might not seem quite so empty." He highlighted "Who the Hell Are You" as an album pick.

== Commercial performance ==
The Polyester Embassy was a success in the band's native Australia, peaking at number 4 and was certified Platinum. However, the album failed to match its success internationally, peaking at number 74 on the UK Albums Chart, and number 63 on the Japanese Albums Chart.

== Track listing ==
All tracks are written by Andrew Van Dorsselaer and Cheyne Coates, except for "Reminiscing" written by Graeham Goble.

Standard edition
No.	Title	Length
1.	"This Is Your Introduction"	2:18
2.	"Who the Hell Are You" (Original Mix – Edit)	3:35
3.	"Don't Call Me Baby" (Original Mix – Edit)	3:47
4.	"Do You Like What You See" (Album Mix)	3:47
5.	"Edible French Chic"	1:51
6.	"Everything You Need" (Original Mix – Edit)	3:42
7.	"She"	1:38
8.	"It's Alright" (Album Mix)	5:12
9.	"It's Very Alright"	1:43
10.	"What Can I Do" (Album Mix)	6:12
11.	"Fly" (Album Mix)	5:08
12.	"'78" (Album Mix)	4:39
13.	"Don't Call Me Baby" (The Dronez Old School Mix)	5:52
14.	"Everything You Need" (Mobin Master 12" Remix)	7:07
15.	"Who the Hell Are You" (John Course & Andy Van Remix)	7:22
Total length:		63:53

Japanese edition
No.	Title	Length
16.	"Reminiscing" (Original Mix – Edit)	3:23
17.	"Reminiscing" (Da Classic Remix – Edit)	3:31
Total length:		70:47

=== Samples contained on the album ===
- "Who the Hell Are You" contains excerpts from "Get Up" performed by Vernon Burch.
- "Don't Call Me Baby" contains excerpts from "Ma quale idea" performed by Pino D'Angiò.
- "Do You Like What You See" contains excerpts from "First True Love Affair" performed by Jimmy Ross.
- "Edible French Chic" contains excerpts from "Stoned Soul Picnic" performed by The Fifth Dimension.
- "Everything You Need" contains excerpts from "Full Tilt Boogie" performed by Uncle Louie.
- "It's Alright" contains excerpts from "Forever More" performed by Tom Browne.
- "What Can I Do" contains excerpts from "90% of Me" performed by Clarence Reid.
- "78" contains excerpts from "Joyous" performed by Pleasure.

== Charts ==
Chart performance for The Polyester Embassy
Chart (2000)	Peak position
Australian Albums (ARIA)	4
Australian Dance Albums (ARIA)	2
Japanese Albums Chart	63
UK Albums Chart	74

== Certifications ==
Region	Certification	Certified units/sales
Australia (ARIA)	Platinum	70,000^{^}
^{^} Shipments figures based on certification alone.
