= Cheyne Coates =

Australian singer, songwriter and producer

- Also known as: Cheyne
- Born: April M. Coates; 6 September 1970 (age 56); Melbourne, Victoria, Australia
- Genre: Dance-pop
- Occupations: Musician, record producer
- Instrument: Vocals
- Years active: 1998–2006
- Labels: Vicious Vinyl; Virgin; Sony
- Formerly of: Madison Avenue

April M. Coates (born 6 September 1970) is an Australian singer, songwriter and producer who performs as Cheyne Coates or Cheyne. Coates (lead vocals) and Andrew Van Dorsselaer (a.k.a. Andy Van) (DJ and background vocals) comprised the duo Madison Avenue (1998–2003). Their song "Don't Call Me Baby" peaked at number two on the Australian Recording Industry Association (ARIA) Singles Chart in 1999 and topped the charts in New Zealand and the United Kingdom in 2000, as well as the Billboard dance charts the United States. Since the break-up of Madison Avenue in 2003, Cheyne recorded an album, Something Wicked This Way Comes, and its first single "I've Got Your Number" which reached No. 26 in 2004.

== Career ==
=== 1998–2003: Madison Avenue ===
During the 1990s, Cheyne Coates was a choreographer and singer in Melbourne. She performed at album launches by other artists and at fashion shows. Coates met record producer, DJ and songwriter Andrew Van Dorsselaer (Andy Van) in a dance club. He had co-founded a record label, Vicious Vinyl, in 1990 with John Course and Colin Daniels.

The duo started working together as Madison Avenue, initially as co-writers and producers in 1998. Their first single, "Fly", featured Kellie Wolfgram as lead vocalist. It was co-written by Coates and Van Dorsselaer. Coates sang on Madison Avenue's breakthrough single, "Don't Call Me Baby" (October 1999), because Van preferred her version, which was recorded to be used as the guide track for the intended singer. It was co-written by Coates with Van Dorsselaer, Gene McFadden and John Whitehead (the sample used for "Don't Call Me Baby" is "Ma quale idea" by Pino D'Angiò, which bassline comes from "Ain't No Stoppin' Us Now" by McFadden & Whitehead). Van Dorsselaer took the song to the MIDEM Conference which led to the group being signed by Virgin Records in the UK and Sony Music for the rest of the world. Coates became established as the public face of the band although Madison Avenue were intended to be a collective dance group, similar to C&C Music Factory or Soul II Soul.

"Don't Call Me Baby" peaked at No. 2 on the ARIA Singles Chart. It sold 200,000 singles in Australia, the best singles sales achieved by any Australian act in that country for 1999. Madison Avenue were the first Australian dance act to top the ARIA Singles Chart. The single was released internationally in 2000. In the United Kingdom, the single topped the UK Singles Chart in May 2000, selling 400,000 copies in Britain. "Don't Call Me Baby" became the first single by an Australian group to top the charts in Britain since "Down Under" by Men at Work in February 1983, a feat it maintained for ten years until "We No Speak Americano" by Yolanda Be Cool and DCUP topped the UK Singles Chart in July 2010. It was a hit in other regions of Europe: Belgium (No. 16), France (No. 41), the Netherlands (No. 22), Sweden (No. 47) and Switzerland (No. 38). "Don't Call Me Baby" also topped the Billboard dance charts in the United States.

Their debut album, The Polyester Embassy, was released in October 2000, which reached the No. 4 of the ARIA Albums Chart. It provided three more singles, "Who the Hell Are You" (July), was a number-one hit in Australia, and on the Billboard Dance Chart, also reaching No. 10 in the UK; "Everything You Need" (October) went to No. 6, which was certified gold in Australia, and it reached the top 40 in the UK; and "Reminiscing", a cover version of the 1978 hit by Little River Band, which peaked at No. 9, it also reached No. 9 in the ARIA End of the Year Australian Singles Chart for that year.

Madison Avenue won the Best Dance Artist at the International Dance Awards in 2001 in Miami. Destiny's Child, Madonna, *NSYNC and Britney Spears were also nominated for the award. At the end of 2001 Madison Avenue went into hiatus. Coates married and the couple had a child in 2002. Madison Avenue resumed performing in 2003 but split by mid-year.

=== 2004–2007: Solo career ===
After Madison Avenue disbanded in 2003, Coates began work on her solo album, Something Wicked This Way Comes, co-producing with Brian Canham (ex-Pseudo Echo), and Ewen McArthur. She started the Aperitif record label in the same year. Its first single, "I've Got Your Number" (April 2004), reached No. 26 on the ARIA Singles Chart. It was added to the play list on BBC Radio 1. Her second single, "Taste You", peaked in the top 100 in July. She released Something Wicked This Way Comes on 4 October 2004.

Her next feature was as vocalist on "Lucky" by the Canadian duo the Soundbluntz, released in July 2006, and their album, Blame the Bling, which followed in October. The album was issued globally in 2007. In 2008 Coates was filmed in a cameo role for Richard Wolstencroft's feature film version of The Beautiful and Damned by F. Scott Fitzgerald.

== Discography ==
=== Albums ===
List of studio albums, with selected details
Title	Album details
Something Wicked This Way Comes	Released: 4 October 2004; Format: CD, digital download; Label: Aperifit

=== Singles ===
List of singles, with selected details
Year	Title	Peak chart positions	Album
Year	Title	AUS	Album
2004	"I've Got Your Number"	26	Something Wicked This Way Comes
2004	"Taste You"	69	Something Wicked This Way Comes
