= The Search for Weng Weng =

- Film poster
- Directed by: Andrew Leavold
- Written by: Andrew Leavold; Daniel Palisa
- Produced by: Andrew Leavold; Daniel Palisa
- Edited by: James Scott; Andrew Leavold; Hayden Peters
- Music by: Francis De Veyra; Damien Devaux; The Screaming Meanies
- Distributed by: Wild Eye Releasing
- Release date: November 29, 2013 (World Premiere)
- Running time: 92 minutes
- Country: Australia
- Language: English

The Search for Weng Weng is a 2013 documentary film about Filipino actor Weng Weng (1957–1992), directed by Andrew Leavold. The film follows Leavold's quest to discover the story of the largely forgotten actor, whose real name was Ernesto de la Cruz. His starring roles were in locally produced action comedies films that found worldwide distribution in the early 1980s. Weng Weng is the shortest leading man in cinema history, standing at 83 cm. Leavold, who is Australian, decided to travel to the Philippines with a backpack and a camera and assemble every piece of information he could on the actor. Leavold interviewed many who sometimes both worked with and knew the actor. This includes Eddie Nicart, Bobby A. Suarez, Marrie Lee, Dolphy, Imelda Marcos, Tikoy Aguiluz, among many others. Leavold eventually discovered his remaining relatives, who described the actor's childhood and last years.

In 2007 a rough cut of the film was screened and caught the attention of producers who bought the project. It became the basis of Mark Hartley's Machete Maidens Unleashed! (2010), a documentary about cult films made in the Philippines, where Leavold worked as an associate producer and was credited for his original idea. Since it only mentioned Weng Weng briefly, it left Leavold unsatisfied who negotiated with the other producers so that he could finish his film. Leavold launched a successful Kickstarter campaign, and with a team he finished his film.

In 2013 the film premiered in the Philippines and played worldwide in the film festivals circuits the following year, being part of the official selection of the Cinemanila International film festival, Sheffield Doc/Fest, and Udine Far East Film Festival, also Leavold won the Melbourne Monster Fest. The film had a limited theatrical run in North America. It was well reviewed and considered to be insightful as it uncovers the life of Weng Weng while also providing a look at an obscure facet of Filipino culture.

== Interviewees ==
- Celso Ad. Castillo
- Tikoy Aguiluz
- Tilman Baumgartel
- Don Gordon Bell
- Teddy Co
- Rez Cortez
- Roland Dantes
- Celing dela Cruz
- Editha dela Cruz
- Nick Deocampo
- Dolphy
- Jim Gaines
- Peque Gallaga
- Eddie Garcia
- Franco Guerrero
- John Kater
- Marrie Lee
- Ed Lejano
- Maria Isabel Lopez
- Tony Maharaj
- Imee Marcos
- Imelda Marcos
- Pia Moran
- Eddie Nicart
- Dante "Boy" Pangilinan
- Rusty Santos
- Henry Strzalkowski
- Bobby A. Suarez
- Edgardo "Boy" Vinarao

== Production ==
While running a video shop in Brisbane, Australia, director Andrew Leavold decided to make a documentary about the Filipino actor Weng Weng.

It was the basis of Mark Hartley's documentary about Filipino cinema Machete Maidens Unleashed! (2010). Leavold launched a successful Kickstarter campaign, and with a team he completed the project.

== Release ==
The Search for Weng Weng premiered on November 29, 2013, at the University of the Philippines Cine Adarna. In 2014, the film had its Canadian premiere on July 29 at the Montreal Fantasia International Film Festival, and in the US on November 8 at the San Diego Asian Film Festival.

== Reception ==
Dennis Harvey of Variety said it was "A surprisingly far-reaching investigation into the life of a forgotten icon of Pinoy exploitation cinema".

Martin Unsworth of Starburst magazine, concluded his review by writing "The Search for Weng Weng not only executes its task admirably, it exceeds by becoming a compelling, thought provoking, and ultimately touching look at the cultural traditions of a country not widely recognised for its cinema. Told with great humour, but never degrading nor mocking".

Amanda Waltz of The Film Stage gave the film a B minus and said: "Wild man or not, Leavold accomplishes what he set out to do, an admirable feat considering the few resources at his disposal. More importantly, he succeeds in spurring a dialogue on Weng Weng’s role as a representation of the Filipino spirit, which, in the grand scheme of things, is more than any film scholar could possibly hope for."

Upon its screening at the International Film Festival Rotterdam it was posted as: "The documentary focuses not only on the - at times hilarious - mythical and mysterious proportions the stories about Weng Weng take on during Leavold’s seven-year quest, but also on the tragedy hiding behind the short life of the small superstar. At the same time, the film zooms out and investigates the Weng Weng phenomenon in the broader context of a more layered Filipino film culture: the ‘Golden Age’ of the Filipino film industry and the first edition of the Manila International Film Festival."

Travis Johnson of FilmInk liked the film and said "it’s thoroughly engrossing stuff. Leavold brings not only an obsessive’s thirst for obscure detail, but a storyteller’s ear for a good yarn."

Emily Black of Cinema Crazed said "the film is a good example of a fan documentary that is well made and brings something to entertain even people who are not into the genre or star being documented."

Anton Bitel of British Film Institute described "Leavold’s quest to uncover the man behind the legend becomes an affectionate if bittersweet history of Filipino exploitation cinema."

== Companion book ==
Leavold published a companion book also named The Search for Weng Weng in 2017.

== Films referenced ==
- Da Best in Da West
- The One Armed Executioner
- Agent OO
- For Your Height Only
- The Impossible Kid
- D'Wild Wild Weng

== See also ==
- B movie
- List of Filipino films
