= Everything You Need (song) =

2000 single by Madison Avenue

Single by Madison Avenue

from the album The Polyester Embassy
- Released: 18 September 2000
- Genre: House
- Length: 3:43
- Label: Vicious Grooves; VC
- Songwriters: Cheyne Coates; Andy Van Dorsselaer
- Producers: Cheyne Coates; Andy Van Dorsselaer

Madison Avenue singles chronology
"Who the Hell Are You" (2000)	"Everything You Need" (2000)	"Reminiscing" (2001)

"Everything You Need" is a song by Australian electronic music duo Madison Avenue, released on 18 September 2000. The single was a top-10 hit in Australia and Hungary, reaching number six in both nations, but did not continue the group's success in the United Kingdom, where it reached number 33. On the US Billboard Dance Club Play chart, the song peaked at number 24.

== Track listings ==
Australian CD single

1. "Everything You Need" (original mix edit)
2. "Everything You Need" (Mobin Master Remix edit)
3. "Don't Call Me Baby" (Armin van Buuren Stalker Mix)
4. "Everything You Need" (original 12-inch mix)

UK CD single

1. "Everything You Need" (original mix edit)
2. "Everything You Need" (Olav Basoski Remix)
3. "Everything You Need" (King Unique Mix)

UK 12-inch single

A1. "Everything You Need" (Olav Basoski Remix)
A2. "Everything You Need" (original mix edit)
B2. "Everything You Need" (King Unique Mix)

UK cassette single

1. "Everything You Need" (original mix edit) – 3:53
2. "Don't Call Me Baby" (The Dronez Old Skool Mix) – 5:51
3. "Who the Hell Are You" (John Course vs Andy Van Remix) – 7:20

== Charts ==
=== Weekly charts ===
Chart (2000–2001)	Peak position
Australia (ARIA)	6
Finland (Suomen virallinen lista)	16
Hungary (Mahasz)	6
Scotland Singles (OCC)	29
UK Singles (OCC)	33
US Dance Club Songs (Billboard)	24

=== Year-end charts ===
Chart (2000)	Position
Australia (ARIA)	82

== Certifications ==
Region	Certification	Certified units/sales
Australia (ARIA)	Gold	35,000^{^}
^{^} Shipments figures based on certification alone.

== Release history ==
Region	Date	Format(s)	Label(s)	Ref.
Australia	18 September 2000	CD	Vicious Grooves	
United Kingdom	15 January 2001	12-inch vinyl; CD; cassette	VC	
