= Machete Maidens Unleashed! =

2010 Australian documentary film by Mark Hartley

- Film poster
- Directed by: Mark Hartley
- Written by: Mark Hartley
- Produced by: Veronica Fury
- Starring: Various
- Cinematography: Karl von Möller
- Edited by: Mark Hartley; Sara Edwards
- Music by: Jamie Blanks
- Production companies: Screen Australia; Fury Productions; Bionic Boy Productions; Melbourne International Film Festival Premiere Fund; Film Victoria; Screen Queensland; Australian Broadcasting Corporation
- Distributed by: Umbrella Entertainment
- Release date: 24 July 2010 (Melbourne International Film Festival)
- Running time: 84 minutes
- Country: Australia
- Language: English

Machete Maidens Unleashed! is a 2010 Australian documentary film directed by Mark Hartley.

== Synopsis ==
The documentary explores exploitation films made in the Philippines in the 1970s and 1980s with interviews for the documentary include Allan Arkush, Judy Brown, Colleen Camp, Roger Corman, Joe Dante, Pam Grier, Jack Hill, John Landis, Danny Peary, Eddie Romero, Cirio H. Santiago, and Brian Trenchard-Smith.

== Interviewees ==
The actors, directors, screenwriters and producers interviewed for the film were:

- Carmen Argenziano
- Allan Arkush
- Alan Birkinshaw
- Judith Brown
- Andrea Cagan
- Colleen Camp
- Steve Carver
- Leigh Christian
- Marlene Clark
- Roger Corman
- Joe Dante
- Jon Davison
- Marissa Delgado
- Nick Deocampo
- R. Lee Ermey
- Leo Fong
- Eddie Garcia
- Pam Grier
- Franco Guerrero
- Sid Haig
- Gloria Hendry
- Jack Hill
- Darby Hinton
- Mark Holcomb
- Lenore Kasdorf
- Rosanne Katon
- Jayne Kennedy
- Leon Isaac Kennedy
- Paul Koslo
- John Landis
- Marrie Lee
- Margaret Markov
- Jan Merlin
- Dick Miller
- Christopher Mitchum
- Eddie Nicart
- Trina Parks
- Danny Peary
- Efren C. Piñon
- Barbara Pokras
- Corliss Randall
- Susanne Reed
- Ricardo Remias
- Eddie Romero
- Fred Roos
- Laurie Rose
- Digna Santiago
- Jane Schaffer
- Samuel M. Sherman
- Dean Tavoularis
- Pete Tombs
- Brian Trenchard-Smith
- Joe Viola
- Patrick Wayne
- Celeste Yarnall
- Joseph Zucchero

== Films referenced ==
This is a list of the films that are commented on or analyzed in the voiceover or by the interviewees. The list is in chronological order. The main films referenced in the documentary are:

- Terror Is a Man (1959)
- Brides of Blood (1968)
- The Mad Doctor of Blood Island (1969)
- Beast of Blood (1970)
- The Losers (1970)
- Beast of the Yellow Night (1971)
- The Big Doll House (1971)
- Women in Cages (1971)
- Night of the Cobra Woman (1972)
- The Twilight People (1972)
- The Hot Box (1972)
- The Big Bird Cage (1972)
- The Woman Hunt (1972)
- Beyond Atlantis (1973)
- Black Mama White Mama (1973)
- Fly Me (1973)
- Savage! (1973)
- TNT Jackson (1974)
- Savage Sisters (1974)
- Cover Girl Models (1975)
- Ebony, Ivory & Jade (1976)
- Hollywood Boulevard (1976)
- The Muthers (1976)
- They Call Her Cleopatra Wong (1978)
- Vampire Hookers (1978)
- Apocalypse Now (1979)
- Dynamite Johnson (1979)
- Up from the Depths (1979)
- Firecracker (1981)
- For Y'ur Height Only (1981)
- The One-Armed Executioner (1981)
- The Impossible Kid (1982)
- Invaders of the Lost Gold (1982)
- The Siege of Firebase Gloria (1989)

== Reception ==
The film was met with critical acclaim as it has an 88% rating on Rotten Tomatoes.

== See also ==
- B movie – Low-budget commercial film genre
- Lists of Philippine films
- Not Quite Hollywood: The Wild, Untold Story of Ozploitation! – 2008 documentary film directed by Mark Hartley
- The Search for Weng Weng
