= Marrie Lee =

Singaporean actress

- Born: Doris Young Siew Keen; November 25, 1959 (age 66); Colony of Singapore
- Other names: Cleo; Cleopatra Wong
- Education: St Anthony’s Convent Secondary School
- Occupations: healthcare company owner, actress, writer, producer, director
- Years active: 1976–1981; 2012–present
- Employer(s): Reel Frenz Productions (founder) (2012–present); Singapore Cinema Pte Ltd (founder) (2014–present)
- Parents: John Young (father); Mary Young (mother)
- Family: Jimmy Young (brother); Betty Young (sister)
- Website: www.cleopatrawong.com

Doris Young Siew Keen (born November 25, 1959) is a Singaporean director, producer, writer and actress. Given the stage name Marrie Lee, she was best known for her role as Cleopatra Wong in the late 1970s.

== Early life ==
Young was born on November 25, 1959, in Singapore to the contractor John Young and his wife Mary. She had an older brother named Jimmy and an older sister named Betty. Due to her father's work with cinema owners and film distributors, around the age of four and five, Young often met Hong Kong film actors while they were promoting their movies in Singapore, making her consider acting as one of her life goals.

Her father died when she was six and her mother died when she was sixteen.

== Career ==
Following her graduation from St Anthony’s Convent Secondary School, Young worked as a restaurant usher in a nightclub or restaurant at Shenton Way in about 1976, where she was discovered by a scouting team from Hong Kong and received her first acting role, a minor role as a female detective based in Singapore for the Hong Kong film Showdown at the Equator.

A year later in 1977, she answered a newspaper ad that asked "Are you smart, sexy and seductive?". The ad was placed by Bobby A. Suarez' BAS Film Productions, looking for a heroine who could ride a motorcycle. Lee won the role among 300 hopefuls. Aged 18, Young shot to fame portraying the title character Cleopatra Wong in 1978's They Call Her Cleopatra Wong, a martial arts film shot in Singapore and Philippines about a female Interpol agent written and directed by Suarez.

Her screen name, Marrie Lee, was created by the producers to capitalize on the fame of the late Bruce Lee. Due to this, during filming there were fans who said they'd watched all of her "brother's" films. "Some fans thought that I was his younger sister", she later told The Business Times in a 2005 interview.

She reprised the role in 1979's Dynamite Johnson, in which she teamed with 10-year-old Singaporean Taekwondo practitioner Johnson Yap, who reprised his role as Sonny Lee respectively from The Bionic Boy, a 1978 film also written and directed by Suarez. She reprised her role for the third time in Devil's Angels, in which she led an all-female team of crimefighters in the Philippines. She performed her own stunts during her filming, including jumping through a real glass window and dangling from a helicopter, and sustained many injuries, including a fractured left wrist.

In the early 1980s, Suarez was developing a film where Young would co-star with Weng Weng. The project never materialized. Her supposed reprisal as Cleopatra Wong as a supporting role on the film The Wandering Samurai also never materialized. After her first three films, Suarez pleaded with her to sign a contract to make ten more movies, but she turned it down. A lead role as Charlie Chan's daughter Ling Chan in the American film Charlie Chan's Number One Daughter also failed to materialise due to the Hollywood labor strikes in 1980 and 1981.

Young retired from acting in 1981 and managed a dance troupe, The Devil's Angels (named after the members from her third Cleopatra Wong film), for two years, while starting a family. At some point when she was offered an acting opportunity, but her husband said no. She later ran a healthcare company Tisco Pte Ltd with her sister Betty from 1989 onwards.

During the Screen Singapore festival from August 1 to 31 in 2005, Young was reunited with Bobby Suarez, where Suarez himself expressed his interest in doing a Cleopatra Wong reboot.

When Suarez died of a heart attack on February 8, 2010, Young inherited the franchise rights of Cleopatra Wong and its website. Also that year, Mark Hartley's documentary film Machete Maidens Unleashed! premiered. Young is interviewed in the documentary that explores exploitation films made in the Philippines in the 1970s and 1980s.

In December 2012, Young started a filmmaking hobbyist group, Reel Frenz Productions, working as a director, producer and writer. She has helped produce at least 12 short films since then.

In 2013, Young was interviewed in the documentary The Search for Weng Weng.

With the help of her partner Jacqueline, she expanded her healthcare company to Hong Kong in 2014. She later established a filmmaking company Singapore Cinema Pte Ltd in February 2015 to oversee her feature film projects. Her first directorial debut feature film Certified Dead was released in 2016.

== Family ==
Young had been married and divorced three times. Film director and writer of Shirkers Sandi Tan is her ex-stepdaughter.

== Filmography ==
=== Films ===
Date of release	Title	Role	Note	Ref
1978	Showdown at the Equator	Female Detective		
1978	They Call Her Cleopatra Wong	Cleopatra Wong		
1979	Dynamite Johnson	Cleopatra Wong		
1979	Devil's Angels	Cleopatra Wong		
2016	Certified Dead	Marrie Lee	Director, executive producer, writer, location manager	

=== Short films ===
Date of release	Title	Role	Note
2013	Rojak	Opera Prince Consort	Director, executive producer, writer
2013	Yokai		executive producer
2013	The Sound of Muse		writer, director, executive producer
2013	Rojak: The Day When TV Went Insane		writer, director, executive producer
2014	René		writer, director, executive producer
2014	Heart Flutters		writer, co-director, executive producer
2014	The Audition: Yolo		writer, director, executive producer
2014	The Next Job		writer, director, executive producer
2014	Choices		director, executive producer
2014	Big Boys Don't Cry		writer, director, executive producer
2016	Music for Her Ears		writer, director
2016	Little Girl Lost		writer, director
2016	Barely Naked		writer, director, executive producer
2017	Lemonaid	Party guest 3	director, executive producer, cameo
2019	7 Bullets		director

=== Documentaries ===
Date of release	Title	Note
2010	Machete Maidens Unleashed!	
2013	The Search For Weng Weng	

== Bibliography ==
- Paul, Louis (2008). "Marrie Lee". Tales From the Cult Film Trenches; Interviews with 36 Actors from Horror, Science Fiction and Exploitation Cinema. Detroit: Wayne State University Press. pp. 157–163. ISBN 978-0-7864-2994-3.
