= Who the Hell Are You =

2000 single by Madison Avenue

Single by Madison Avenue

from the album The Polyester Embassy
- Released: 5 June 2000
- Genre: House
- Length: 3:35
- Label: Vicious Grooves; VC
- Songwriters: Cheyne Coates; Andy Van Dorsselaer
- Producer: Madison Avenue

Madison Avenue singles chronology
"Don't Call Me Baby" (1999)	"Who the Hell Are You" (2000)	"Everything You Need" (2000)

Music video
- "Who the Hell Are You" on YouTube

"Who the Hell Are You" is a song by Australian house music band Madison Avenue, released as the second single from their only studio album, The Polyester Embassy (2000). The song was released in Australia on 5 June 2000 and was given a UK release on 9 October 2000. In the United States, the single was serviced to rhythmic contemporary radio in January 2001. The song contains elements from Vernon Burch's 1979 song "Get Up".

"Who the Hell Are You" was a hit in the band's native Australia, debuting at number one on the ARIA Singles Chart and staying there for two weeks. Later in the year, the song reached number 10 in the United Kingdom, number 32 in New Zealand, and number 41 in Ireland. In March 2001, it topped the US Billboard Dance Club Play chart for a week. The song's music video, directed by Mark Hartley, won the 2000 ARIA Music Award for Best Video.

== Track listings ==
Australian CD single

1. "Who the Hell Are You" (original mix – edit) – 3:30
2. "Who the Hell Are You" (John Course & Andy Van remix) – 7:25
3. "Don't Call Me Baby" (Madison Babe from Outer Space remix) – 9:30
4. "Who the Hell Are You" (original 12-inch mix) – 6:29

Australian 12-inch single

A. "Who the Hell Are You" (original 12-inch mix)
B. "Who the Hell Are You" (John Course vs Andy Van remix)

UK CD single

1. "Who the Hell Are You" (original mix) – 6:28
2. "Who the Hell Are You" (Illicit remix) – 7:10
3. "Who the Hell Are You" (Ain't No Love mix) – 6:14
4. "Who the Hell Are You" (video)

UK 12-inch single

A1. "Who the Hell Are You" (Illicit remix) – 7:10
B1. "Who the Hell Are You" (Ain't No Love mix) – 6:14
B2. "Who the Hell Are You" (John Course vs Andy Van remix) – 6:26

UK cassette single

1. "Who the Hell Are You" (original mix) – 6:28
2. "Who the Hell Are You" (Illicit remix) – 7:10
3. "Who the Hell Are You" (Ain't No Love mix) – 6:14

European CD single

1. "Who the Hell Are You" (Illicit mix edit) – 3:30
2. "Who the Hell Are You" (original mix edit) – 3:28

== Charts ==
=== Weekly charts ===
Chart (2000–2001)	Peak position
Australia (ARIA)	1
Belgium (Ultratip Bubbling Under Flanders)	6
Belgium (Ultratip Bubbling Under Wallonia)	13
Canada Dance/Urban (RPM)	3 (Note: "Who the Hell Are You" reached number three when RPM ceased publication in November 2000.)
Europe (Eurochart Hot 100)	44
Ireland (IRMA)	41
New Zealand (Recorded Music NZ)	32
Scottish Singles Sales (Official Charts)	10
UK Singles (Official Charts)	10
UK Dance (Official Charts)	14
US Dance Club Songs (Billboard)	1

=== Year-end charts ===
Chart (2000)	Position
Australia (ARIA)	8

Chart (2001)	Position
US Dance Club Play (Billboard)	32

== Certifications ==
Region	Certification	Certified units/sales
Australia (ARIA)	Platinum	70,000^{^}
^{^} Shipments figures based on certification alone.

== Release history ==
Region	Date	Format(s)	Label(s)	Ref(s).
Australia	5 June 2000	CD	Vicious Grooves	
United Kingdom	9 October 2000	12-inch vinyl; CD; cassette	Vicious Grooves; VC	
United States	30 January 2001	Rhythmic contemporary radio	C2	

== See also ==
- List of number-one singles in Australia in 2000
- List of number-one dance singles of 2001 (U.S.)
