= Cleopatra Wong =

- First appearance: They Call Her Cleopatra Wong (1978)
- Last appearance: Devil’s Angels (1979)
- Created by: Bobby A. Suarez
- Portrayed by: Marrie Lee (screen name of Doris Young)

In-universe information
- Nickname: Female Big Boss
- Gender: Female
- Title: Chief Inspector
- Occupation: Secret agent
- Affiliation: Interpol
- Relatives: Bionic Boy
- Nationality: Singaporean

Cleopatra Wong is a fictional character created in 1978 by Filipino filmmaker and producer Bobby A. Suarez, who featured her in three feature-length movies: They Call Her Cleopatra Wong in 1978, Dynamite Johnson (a.k.a. Bionic Boy II) in 1979, and Devil’s Angels (a.k.a. Devil’s Three) in 1980. She was portrayed by Singapore actress Marrie Lee.

== Fictional character biography ==
The Singapore-based fictional Interpol agent has been used in an early film franchise hailing from Southeast Asia, and has remained the only film franchise featuring a Singaporean as the central figure. In Dynamite Johnson, the character Cleopatra Wong joined forces with Bionic Boy, another recurring character also created by Bobby A. Suarez.

The Cleopatra Wong films are renowned for bringing together elements pertaining both to the Western spy movie genre and to the Asian martial arts film genre, with the use of numerous gadgets and a variety of exotic locations, as well as for the central character to display top class skills with men, motorbikes, automatic pistols, and even longbow armed with dangerously explosive arrows.

Cleopatra Wong's original tagline in 1978 was: She purrs like a kitten... Makes love like a siren... Fights like a panther.

== Inspiration ==
The fictional character of Cleopatra Wong was inspired by other fictional characters such as James Bond created in 1953 and Cleopatra Jones created in 1973. She was dubbed by the press "Asia's female James Bond". Her creation also took inspiration from the roles played by Bruce Lee in The Big Boss (1971), Fist of Fury (1972) and Way of the Dragon (1972), to such an extent that Cleopatra Wong was nicknamed the "Female Big Boss", and that Doris Young who acted the part was given by Bobby A. Suarez the screen name "Marrie Lee", thus sharing Bruce Lee's surname.

== Name ==
The name of the character was a combination of the first name Cleopatra taken from its American blaxploitation predecessor Cleopatra Jones, and of the Asian surname Wong, an extremely widespread name among Chinese population or populations of Chinese descent. The character's name served as the main marketing tool to promote the first installment of the media franchise. The use of the phrase "they call her…" was in line with the trend of the day, as in the 1970s there was a vogue for titles of that sort, including spaghetti westerns They Call Me Trinity and They Call Me Renegade, Swedish action-thriller They Call Her One Eye, Sidney Poitier-starring drama They Call Me Mister Tibbs!, and even a Filipino martial arts knock-off, They Call Him Chop Suey, which was written and directed by Bobby A. Suarez himself in 1976, two years before he created Cleopatra Wong.

== Films ==
- 1978: They Call Her Cleopatra Wong
- 1979: Dynamite Johnson
- 1979: Devil’s Angels

== Cultural impact ==
Cinematically, Cleopatra Wong has been an influence within the spy as well as martial arts genres, becoming an icon of popular culture. A major testament to Cleopatra Wong’s prominence in popular culture was made public when Quentin Tarantino, talking about the character played by Uma Thurman in his Kill Bill series declared:

"Cleopatra Wong was a gigantic inspiration".

— Quentin Tarantino, The Straits Times, 22 October 2003

Cleopatra Wong's influence on film was also documented by Mark Hartley's feature-length documentary Machete Maidens Unleashed! released in 2010.

Moreover, Cleopatra Wong's influence extended beyond film, reaching out to the music industry, when Australian musician and composer Amanda Brown, following the breakup of The Go-Betweens, formed with former Go-Betweens drummer Lindy Morrison as well as with Michael Armiger on bass guitar, Colin Bloxsom and Mark Moffatt, a band called Cleopatra Wong which was active from 1991 to 1992.

Marrie Lee "will never forget" the Singapore film critic who wrote that she was "Cleopatra Wrong".

== Franchise ==
In 2000, the Cleopatra Wong franchise was held by Cleopatra Wong International, a company founded by Raphaël Millet and former actress Doris Young (a.k.a. Marrie Lee) and incorporated in Singapore, in order both to preserve the heritage of the character and to revive it.

== See also ==
- James Bond
- Cleopatra Jones
- Bruce Lee
- Bobby A. Suarez

== Bibliography ==
- Millet, Raphaël (2006). Singapore Cinema. Singapore: Editions Didier Millet. ISBN 981-4155-42-X.
