= The Impossible Kid =

The Impossible Kid may refer to:

- The Impossible Kid (album), a 2016 album by Aesop Rock
- The Impossible Kid (film), a 1982 film
