= I've Got Your Number =

I've Got Your Number or I Got Your Number may refer to:

- I've Got Your Number (film), 1934 film
- I've Got Your Number (novel), 2012 novel by Sophie Kinsella

== Music ==
- I've Got Your Number (album), a 1993 album by jazz saxophonist Tom Chapin
- "I've Got Your Number" (Cheyne Coates song), 2004 dance song
- "I've Got Your Number" (Cy Coleman song), song by Cy Coleman and others from the 1962 musical Little Me
- "I Got Your Number" (Deep Purple song), 2003 song by Deep Purple from the album Bananas
- "I Got Your Number", 1995 song by Deadstar
- "I've Got Your Number", 2003 song by Elbow

== See also ==
- "Got Your Number", 2008 song by Nadia Oh from the album Hot Like Wow
- "Got Your Number" 2005 advertising campaign for 118118
- We've Got Your Number, a BBC National Lottery game show in 1999
