= Screen Singapore =

Film festival in Singapore

- Location: Singapore
- No. of films: 31
- Festival date: 1 August 2005 – 31 August 2005
- Website: www.happybirthday.org.sg

Screen Singapore was a film festival in Singapore held from 1 August 2005 to 31 August 2005, on the occasion of the 40th anniversary of the independence of Singapore, to celebrate the heritage of Singaporean cinema from pre-independence days to the present.

Presenting a total of 31 feature films (17 vintage ones, from 1955 to 1978, and 14 contemporary ones from 1995 to 2005), plus 15 short films (from 1996 to 2004) over an entire month, it was and has remained the largest showcase of Singaporean cinema.

== Festival ==
=== Organisation ===
Organised by Phish Communications, Screen Singapore was conceptualised and curated by Shirlene Noordin and Raphaël Millet, with curatorial support from Yuni Hadi and Wenjie Zhang. It was sponsored by the Singapore Film Commission, Kodak and the Ministry of Information, Communications and the Arts. It was also supported by Cathay Keris Films, Oak3 Films and the French Embassy in Singapore.

=== Launch ===
The festival was officially launched at Alliance Française in Singapore on 1 August 2005 and its official venues were at Singapore History Museum and The Arts House at the Old Parliament.

=== Programmes ===
==== Feature films ====
- Penarek Becha by P. Ramlee, 1955.
- Azimat by Rolf Bayer, 1958.
- Satay by K.M. Basker, 1958.
- Sumpah Pontianak by B.N. Rao, 1958.
- Rasah Sayang Eh by L. Krishnan, 1958.
- Korban Fitnah by P.L. Kapur, 1959.
- Lion City by Yi Sui, 1960.
- Ibu Mertuaku by P. Ramlee, 1962.
- Labu dan Labi by P. Ramlee, 1962.
- Darah Muda by Jamil Sulong, 1963.
- Jiran Sekampong by Hussain Haniff, 1965.
- Jefri Zain - Gerak Kilat by Jamil Sulong, 1965.
- Chinta Kaseh Sayang by Hussain Haniff, 1965.
- Kekaseh by Noordin Ahmad, 1968.
- Ring of Fury by Tony Yeow and James Sebastian, 1973.
- Two Sides of the Bridge by Lim Ann, 1976.
- They Call Her... Cleopatra Wong by George Richardson, 1978.
- Mee Pok Man by Eric Khoo, 1995.
- The Road Less Travelled by Lim Suat Yen, 1997.
- Twelve Storeys by Eric Khoo, 1997.
- Forever Fever by Glen Goei, 1998.
- That One No Enough by Jack Neo, 1999.
- Eating Air by Kelvin Tong and Jasmine Ng, 1999.
- Chicken Rice War by Cheek, 2000.
- I Not Stupid by Jack Neo, 2002.
- Homerun by Jack Neo, 2003.
- Fifteen by Royston Tan, 2003.
- Return to Pontianak by Djinn, 2004.
- Zombie Dogs by Toh Hai Leong, 2004.
- Perth by Djinn, 2004.
- The Maid by Kelvin Tong, 2005.

==== Short films ====
- Moveable Feast by Sandi Tan, 1996.
- Beansprouts and Salted Fish by Cheek, 1997.
- Lunch Time by Wee Li Lin, 2000.
- Sons by Royston Tan, 2000.
- Gourmet Baby by Sandi Tan, 2001.
- Mother by Royston Tan, 2001.
- All My Presents directed by Wee Li Lin, 2002.
- Hock Hiap Leong by Royston Tan, 2002.
- Holiday by Wee Li Lin, 2002.
- Homemaker by Wee Li Lin, 2002.
- The Secret Heaven by Sun Koh, 2002.
- The Usher by June Chua, 2003.
- Bliss by Victric Thng, 2004.
- Lim Poh Huat by Lee Wong, 2004.
- Old Parliament Remixed by Lee Wong, 2004.

=== Free Outdoor Screening ===
A Free Outdoor Screening of selected short films was organised by Screen Singapore on Sunday 14 August 2005, at the River Promenade, next to the UOB building, at the end of Boat Quay. One of the members of the audience blogged: How could I forget to bring along a camera yesterday night to capture the atmosphere of the free outdoor screening of short films at the River Promenade, next to UOB Plaza? A picture tells a thousand words, and in the lacking of one, allow me to attempt to describe it..

=== Guests ===
A number of film celebrities made special appearances during the festival:

- Peter Chong (actor of Ring of Fury)
- Tony Yeow (co-director of Ring of Fury)
- Lim Suat Yen (director of The Road Less Travelled)
- Kelvin Tong (director of The Maid)
- Djinn (who directed Perth and Return to Pontianak)
- Lim Kay Tong (actor in Perth)
- Doris Young, a.k.a. Marrie Lee (who played Cleopatra Wong in three movies)
- Maria Menado (who famously acted the Pontianak - or female vampire - in classic horror films of the 1950s)
- Wahid Satay (actor)

One of the members of the audience blogged about Doris Young, a.k.a. Marrie Lee, a.k.a. Cleopatra Wong: It was a full house eagerly awaiting the appearance of Cleopatra Wong in person. I went in early in order to get a prime seat, but alas, there were already some persons seated in the middle of the theatre (those who have been to the Arts House Screening Room will know what I mean). But I managed a row behind, and to my wicked glee, those in front were told to make room for the special guests. They were unhappy of course (there were no "Reserved" signs), but given no choice anyway. So there I was, with Cleo Wong potentially sitting in front of me during the screening..

He also blogged about Maria Menado special guest appearance: When Maria Menado arrived at the Alliance Francaise, she was greeted with numerous camera flashes. Dressed in a beautiful red Baju Kurung, everyone was eager to get a photograph of the star of the original Pontianak. As with all special appearances in Screen Singapore, the invited guests are to say a few words to the audience. Maria (she's part of Malaysian Royalty btw) exclaimed that she was extremely happy to see many people attending the screening for Sumpah Pontianak, especially when the film was close to 50 years old, and some members of the audience were not even around when it was screened for the first time (i.e. people like me)..

International film programmers and film critics also came to attend the festival, such as Olivier Père (then General Delegate of the Directors' Fortnight in Cannes), Jeremy Segay (programmer for the Directors' Fortnight in Cannes), Stephen Cremin (film critic), Kate Reidy from the Swiss festival Black Movie, etc.

== Impact ==
The festival was extremely well attended by the audience and well covered by the media. This blog by a member of the audience and avid cinephile bears testimony to it: Unfortunately, this entry isn't the review for Ring of Fury, which I very much wanted to watch. When I reached The Arts House this evening to purchase tickets, I was told it was already Sold Out *faint*, since last Thursday! *double faint* I should have seen it coming, given the widespread media coverage of Screen Singapore..

The festival has been noted as an important showcase of Singaporean cinema, and was abundantly discussed in the press as well as online

. It unearthed Ring of Fury, a long forgotten feature film made in 1973 which had been banned from screening in Singapore in the 1970s, and had never been shown since then. Screen Singapore offered it its Singapore première in 2005, exactly 32 years after it had been filmed.

On the occasion of his first trip to Singapore to attend the festival Screen Singapore, Olivier Père was introduced to Eric Khoo and given a chance to preview his film My Magic which he subsequently selected to première at the Directors' Fortnight that same year, in 2005.

A retrospective of Singaporean films was also subsequently presented in Geneva in 2006 during the festival Black Movie, after one of the festival's representatives, Kate Reidy, had come to attend Screen Singapore 2005.
