= Vandalism (duo) =

Australian electro house band

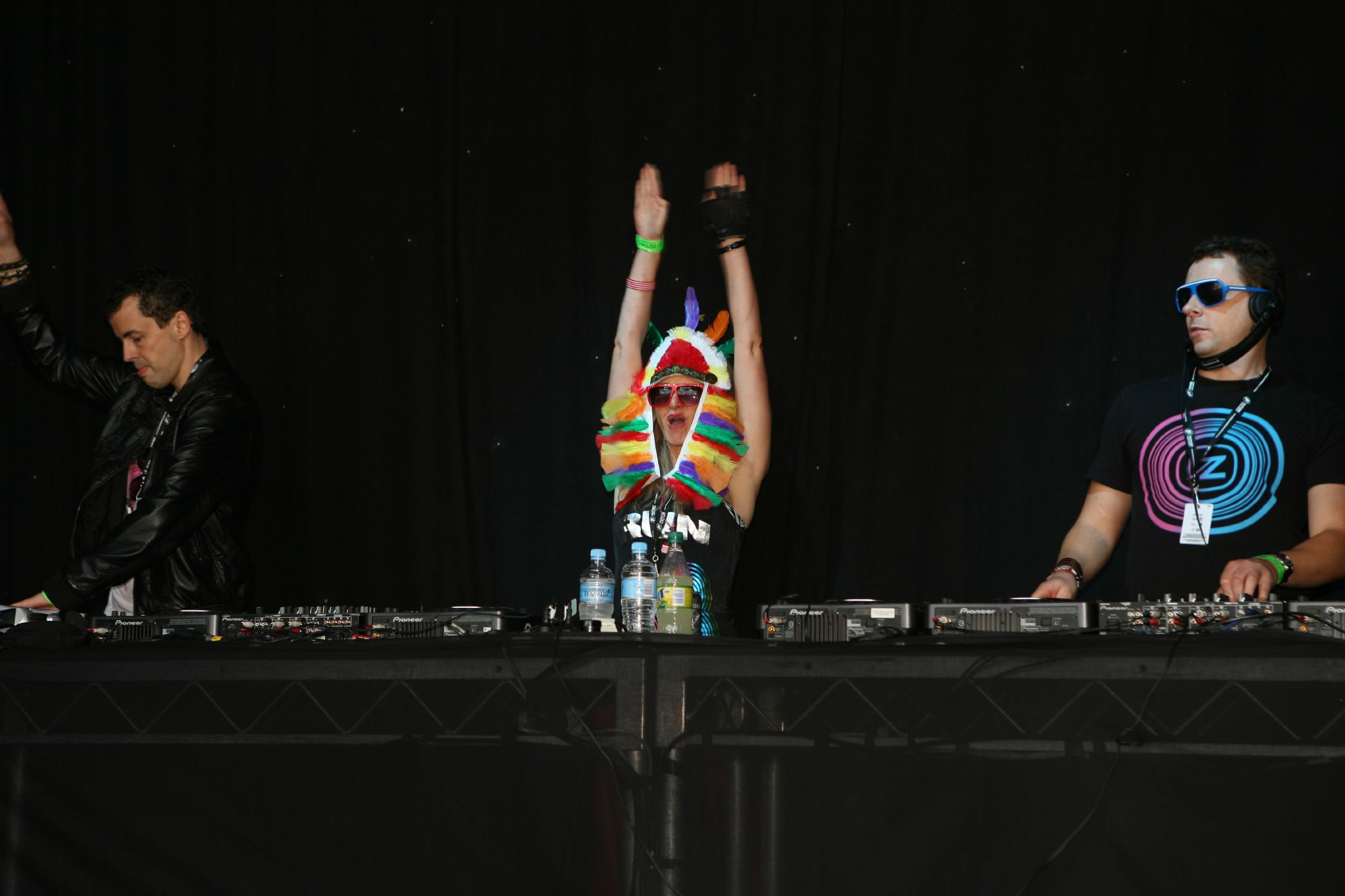
- Vandalism in January 2009

Background information
- Origin: Melbourne, Victoria, Australia
- Genres: Electro house
- Years active: 2004–present
- Labels: Vicious Recordings
- Members: Andy Van; Cassie Van
- Past members: Kam Denny
- Website: www.vandalism.com.au

Vandalism is an Australian electro house music group. It comprises DJ Andy Van (formerly of Madison Avenue), vocalist Cassie Van Dorsselaer, and formerly Kam Denny.

== Musical career ==
Vandalism began in 2004 as a partnership between producers Andy Van Dorsselaer & Kam Denny. The duo initially remixed other producers' works before releasing their own original productions. In 2005, Cassie Van joined the group as the lead vocalist.

In April 2009, Kam Denny left Vandalism.

== Discography ==
=== Singles ===
List of singles, with selected chart positions
Title	Year	Peak chart positions
Title	Year	AUS
"Girls & Boys"	2005	80
"Never Say Never"	2006	15
"Twisted"	2006	79
"Smash Disco"	2008	—
"Bucci Bag"	2009	—
"Hablando"	2009	—
"Vegas" (with Static Revenger)	2010	—
"Throw Your Hands Up!"	2010	—
"She Got It" (with Angger Dimas)	2010	—
"Rockin' (In the Place)" (with Dwight the Young One)	2011	—
"Insane"	2011	—
"Coming Alive" (with iKid)	2012	—
"Anywhere Else Tonight" (featuring Nick Clow)	2013	—
"Yes" (with FTampa)	2013	—
"Caraska (Can You Feel It)" (featuring King Ru)	2014	—
"Bottles Up" (with Jason Risk)	2015	—
"Stupid Hot!"(with Bombs Away)	2016	—
"Forever" (vs Tommie Sunshine and Disco Fries)	2016	—
"Shiny Disco Balls"	2017	—
"Just a Freak"	2017	—
"Do It Proper (Do You Really Want It)"(with Chicken Lips)	2017	—
"4 the Haterz" (with Eddy Hardcore)	2018	—

== Awards and nominations ==
=== APRA Awards ===
The APRA Awards are presented annually from 1982 by the Australasian Performing Right Association (APRA), "honouring composers and songwriters". They commenced in 1982.

Year	Nominee / work	Award	Result	Ref.
2013	"Coming Alive" – Vandalism & Ikid (Ilan Kidron, Andrew Van Dorsselaer, Cassandra Van Dorsselaer)	Dance Work of the Year	Nominated	
