= Never Say Never (Vandalism song) =

2006 single by Vandalism

Single by Vandalism

from the album Turn the World On
- B-side: "It's All Your Fault"
- Released: 27 February 2006
- Length: 2:56
- Label: Capitol
- Songwriters: Frank Zincavage; Debora Iyall; Benjamin Bossi; Peter Woods; Larry Carter
- Producers: Andy Van; Kam Denny

Vandalism singles chronology
"Girls & Boys" (2005)	"Never Say Never" (2006)	"Twisted" (2006)

"Never Say Never" is the second single by Australian band Vandalism. It was their first release with Capitol Records and is from their debut album, Turn the World On. The song peaked at number 15 in Australia and number eight in Finland.

== Track listing ==
Australian CD single

1. "Never Say Never" (original radio edit) – 2:56
2. "Never Say Never" (Dirty South mix) – 7:16
3. "It's All Your Fault" (radio edit) – 2:46
4. "Never Say Never" (Mr. Timothy mix) – 6:34
5. "Never Say Never" (original extended mix) – 5:57
6. "Never Say Never" (Punq DJ's 'Be Discreet' mix) – 8:26

== Charts ==
=== Weekly charts ===
Chart (2006)	Peak position
Australia (ARIA)	15
Australian Artists (ARIA)	6
Australian Club Tracks (ARIA)	1
Australian Dance (ARIA)	4
Finland (Suomen virallinen lista)	8

=== Year-end charts ===
Chart (2006)	Position
Australian Artists (ARIA)	25
Australian Club Chart (ARIA)	7
Australian Dance (ARIA)	13

== Release history ==
Region	Release date	Format	Label	Catalogue	Ref.
Australia	27 February 2006	CD	Capitol	3575032	
