= Taste You =

Taste You may refer to:

- "Taste You" (Auf der Maur song)
- "Taste You" (Cheyne song)
