= 3 Knocks =

Studio album by Pendulum
- Released: 1997
- Recorded: 1995–1997
- Genre: Electronic, ambient house, progressive house, experimental
- Length: 110:06
- Label: Vicious Vinyl
- Producer: Pendulum

Singles from 3 Knocks
- 1. "I Need You" Released: 1995; 2. "Awesome Party/Insecurity" Released: 1995; 3. "Coma" Released: July 1997

3 Knocks is the only studio album by Australian ambient music band, Pendulum. The album was released in 1997, and consisted of two discs. The first disc, called Well Being, contained new material, while the second disc, Exploitation, contained songs released in earlier years (1994 through 1996).

The album included three singles and received positive reception from Mixmag, DJ and Rolling Stone.

"Coma" won the ARIA Award for Best Dance Release at the ARIA Music Awards of 1997.

== Track listing ==
Disc One: Well Being
| No. | Title | Length |
|---|---|---|
| 1. | "I am Crazy" | 7:02 |
| 2. | "Coma" | 6:45 |
| 3. | "I Never Knew You" | 8:10 |
| 4. | "Truth Bit 1" | 0:10 |
| 5. | "I Am Not" | 5:58 |
| 6. | "Truth Bit 2" | 0:17 |
| 7. | "Option C" | 4:43 |
| 8. | "Good Bit" | 0:40 |
| 9. | "On Monday" | 4:51 |
| 10. | "God Bit" | 4:07 |
| 11. | "Learn Her Way" | 6:24 |
| 12. | "Antichrist" | 0:36 |
| 13. | "Learn Baby Learn" | 3:51 |

Disc Two: Exploitation
| No. | Title | Length |
|---|---|---|
| 1. | "I Need You (Option A)" | 7:54 |
| 2. | "Insecurity" | 9:03 |
| 3. | "Awesome Party" | 4:36 |
| 4. | "I Need You" (Mindwarp Remix) | 9:04 |
| 5. | "Coma" (Vicious Remix) | 9:27 |
| 6. | "I Am Not" (Arden's Big Blue Remix) | 9:18 |
| 7. | "Ever Since I Was Born" (Drum'N'Bass Remix) | 7:10 |
