= Something Wicked This Way Comes (Cheyne album) =

Studio album by Cheyne
- Released: 4 October 2004
- Genres: Dance, house
- Length: 41:46
- Label: Aperifit

Cheyne/Madison Avenue chronology
The Polyester Embassy (2000)	Something Wicked This Way Comes (2004)

Alternate cover
- Digital edition

Singles from Something Wicked This Way Comes
- 1. "I've Got Your Number" Released: April 2004; 2. "Taste You" Released: July 2004

Something Wicked This Way Comes is the first solo studio album by Australian singer Cheyne Coates after leaving Madison Avenue. It produced two singles, "I've Got Your Number" and "Taste You", released in Australia.

== Track listing ==
Something Wicked This Way Comes
No.	Title	Writer(s)	Producer(s)	Length
1.	"Femininity"	Cheyne Coates	Ewan McArthur; Cheyne Coates	3:01
2.	"Taste You"	Cheyne Coates; Brian Canham	Brian Canham	4:02
3.	"I've Got Your Number"	Cheyne Coates	Ewan McArthur; Cheyne Coates	3:08
4.	"Love to Have You"	Cheyne Coates; Brian Canham	Brian Canham	4:16
5.	"Glory Girl"	Cheyne Coates; Ewan McArthur	Ewan McArthur	2:58
6.	"Doesn't Mean a Thing"	Cheyne Coates; Brian Canham	Brian Canham	4:01
7.	"Bitch"	Cheyne Coates; Ewan McArthur	Ewan McArthur; Cheyne Coates	3:22
8.	"As Seen on TV"	Cheyne Coates; Ewan McArthur	Ewan McArthur	3:22
9.	"Label Whore"	Cheyne Coates	Cheyne Coates	5:55
10.	"Pony"	Cheyne Coates; Ben Grayson	Ben Grayson	4:39
11.	"I Don't Do Nice"	Cheyne Coates; Ewan McArthur	Ewan McArthur	3:02
