= Twisted (Vandalism song) =

Single by Vandalism

from the album Turn the World On
- Released: 2006
- Label: Capitol
- Songwriter(s): Denny; Van Dorsselaer; Van Dorsselaer

Vandalism singles chronology
"Never Say Never" (2006)	"Twisted" (2006)

"Twisted" is a song by Australian band Vandalism, and the second single from their debut album Turn the World On.

== Track listing ==
Australian CD single

1. "Twisted" (Original Mix – Edit)
2. "Twisted" (Club Mix)
3. "Twisted" (TV Rock Mix)
4. "Never Say Never" (The Hard Rub)
5. "Twisted" (Kam Denny's Freakshow Dub)
6. "Twisted" (Pitch Black mix)

== Charts ==
Chart (2006)	Peak position
Australia (ARIA)	79
Australia Artist Singles (ARIA)	14
Australia Dance Singles (ARIA)	7
Australia Physical Singles (ARIA)	50
Finland (Suomen virallinen lista)	9

== Release history ==
Country	Release date	Format	Label	Catalogue
Australia	14 October 2006	CD single, digital download	Capitol	VG12044CD
