= Pia Moran =

Filipino actress

- Born: Philippines
- Occupation: Actor
- Known for: The Search for Weng Weng

Maria Susan Casiño, professionally known as Pia Moran, is an actress in the Philippines. She was known as Miss Body Language for her risque dance moves.

== Career ==
She worked as living mannequin in the department store in Cubao, Quezon City. She also worked in Taxco as a star model-dancer before joining in showbiz. Moran known for her dance famous disco hits like Body Language and Earthquake in the '80s.

In 1981 she starred in sexy-comedy movies such as A Man Called Tolonges with Dyords Javier, and Bonie En Klayd with Redford White.

On December 25, 1982, premiered The Cute... The Sexy n' The Tiny where Moran acted as one of the three leads in alongside Berting Labra and Weng Weng.

In 1985 she acted in Rambuto with Palito, among others.

In 2004 Moran acted in her comeback movies in Milan starring Claudine Barretto and Piolo Pascual.

In 2005 Moran was also included in the powerhouse cast of ABS-CBN TV series like Ikaw ang Lahat sa Akin starring Claudine Barretto, Diether Ocampo, John Lloyd Cruz, Bea Alonzo, Shaina Magdayao and Angelika dela Cruz.

In 2007 she played a role in You Got Me!, starring Toni Gonzaga and Sam Milby. Another project for Moran that year was Love Spell starring Gee-Ann Abrahan, Mickey Perz, Bodie Cruz, Tirso Cruz III and Jacklyn Jose.

In 2013 Moran was interviewed in the documentary film The Search for Weng Weng.

== Political views ==
In 1986 Moran campaigned for the reelection of president Ferdinand Marcos in the 1986 snap election.

== Personal life ==
Moran had a relationship with former actor Greggy Liwag in the 1980s. On July 10, 1991, Moran was arrested during a raid by anti-narcotics agents in Quezon City on suspicion of possessing drugs; she was released the next day upon promising Quezon City Vice Mayor Tito Sotto that she will cooperate with the city's anti-drug campaign. On September 24, 1992, Moran was arrested again with her live-in partner in Pasay City for illegal possession of the drug methamphetamine (locally known as "shabu").

== Filmography ==
=== Film ===
- Peter Pandesal (1977) – Dancer
- Soldyer! (1979)
- Imong Taxi Driver (1980)
- A Man Called Tolonges (1981)
- Boni and Klayd (1981)
- Man to Man (1982)
- The Cute... The Sexy n' the Tiny (1982)
- Atsay Killer (1983)
- E.T. Is Estong Tutong (1983)
- Sampaloc 1963 (1984)
- High Blood (1985)
- Praybet Depektib Akademi (1986)
- Rangers in the Wrong War (1987)
- Red Roses for a Call Girl (1988)
- Milan (2004)
- Can This Be Love (2005)
- You Got Me! (2007)
- Tiltil (2008)
- Girl, Boy, Bakla, Tomboy (2013) – Herself
- The Search for Weng Weng (2013) – Interviewee
- Momshies! Ang Soul Mo'y Akin! (2021) – Amanda
- Katips (2021) – Old Lally

=== Television ===
- Ikaw ang Lahat sa Akin (2005)
- Mga Anghel na Walang Langit (2005–2006)
- Pilipinas, Game KNB? (2007)
- Shall We Dance? (2007)
- Love Spell (2007)
- Ysabella (2007–2008)
- Jim Fernandez's Galema: Anak ni Zuma (2013) Pacita
