= Warriors of the Apocalypse (1985 film) =

- Directed by: Bobby A. Suarez
- Screenplay by: Bobby A. Suarez, Ken Metcalfe
- Produced by: Bobby A. Suarez
- Starring: Michael James, Deborah Moore
- Music by: Ole Hoyer
- Release date: April 4, 1985
- Language: English

Warriors of the Apocalypse is a 1985 science fiction action film directed by Bobby A. Suarez. It is also known as Time Raiders, Operation Overkill and Searchers of the Voodoo Mountain. It may have been inspired by Anabasis (Xenophon)

== Plot ==
150 years after the third world war, civilization has been wiped out by nuclear war and much of Earth is a scorched desert. One of the smaller tribes of the few survivors that are barely hanging on are led by Trapper, an adventurer. They must battle rival gangs for the few resources that remain

After being told of a mysterious place where food is abundant. Trapper leads the tribe on a search for the Mountain of Life. The Mountain of Life is a near fabled area untouched by the nuclear holocaust, where residents have achieved eternal life.

Along the way the enter a forest and encounter Giant Bill and his group, pygmy tribes with mystic healing powers, bands of savage outlaws and a tribe of Amazon women. The pygmies and Amazons live together. The technology level of the various tribes varies greatly

The Mountain of Life is ruled by a warrior quen and an evil priest, and appears to be based on the Aztec or Mayan culture, although they do possess advanced technology. The high priest and the queen can shoot lasers from their eyes

After a final battle between the queen and high priest, Trapper and his tribe elect to stay at the Mountain of Life

== Home Release ==
Released on DVD in 2011 A Facebook page is maintained for the movie.

== Cast ==
- Michael James as Trapper
- Deborah Moore as Princess Sheela
- Ken Metcalfe as High Priest Garuk
- Franco Guerrero as Anuk
- Mike Cohen
- Robert Marius
- David Brass
- Charlotte Cain
- Steve Rogers – (as Stephen Rogers)
- David Light

== Production ==
Made in the Philippines

== Reception ==
Creature Feature gave the movie 3 out of 5 stars, finding the action well done, the dialogue somewhat lacking and the movie to me a mixture of Mad Max. and She: A History of Adventure. Kim Newman grouped the movie in with many others, labeling it repetitive and penny-pinching. The laser battle between the queen and the high priest was nominated worst special effect of 1985. Sci-fi Central found the movie cheap and fodder for MST3K In "The Miller/Romero Connection" the inclusion of the fantasy element was seen as a plus, but little else of worth was found.
