= Bobby A. Suarez =

Filipino film producer, director and screenwriter

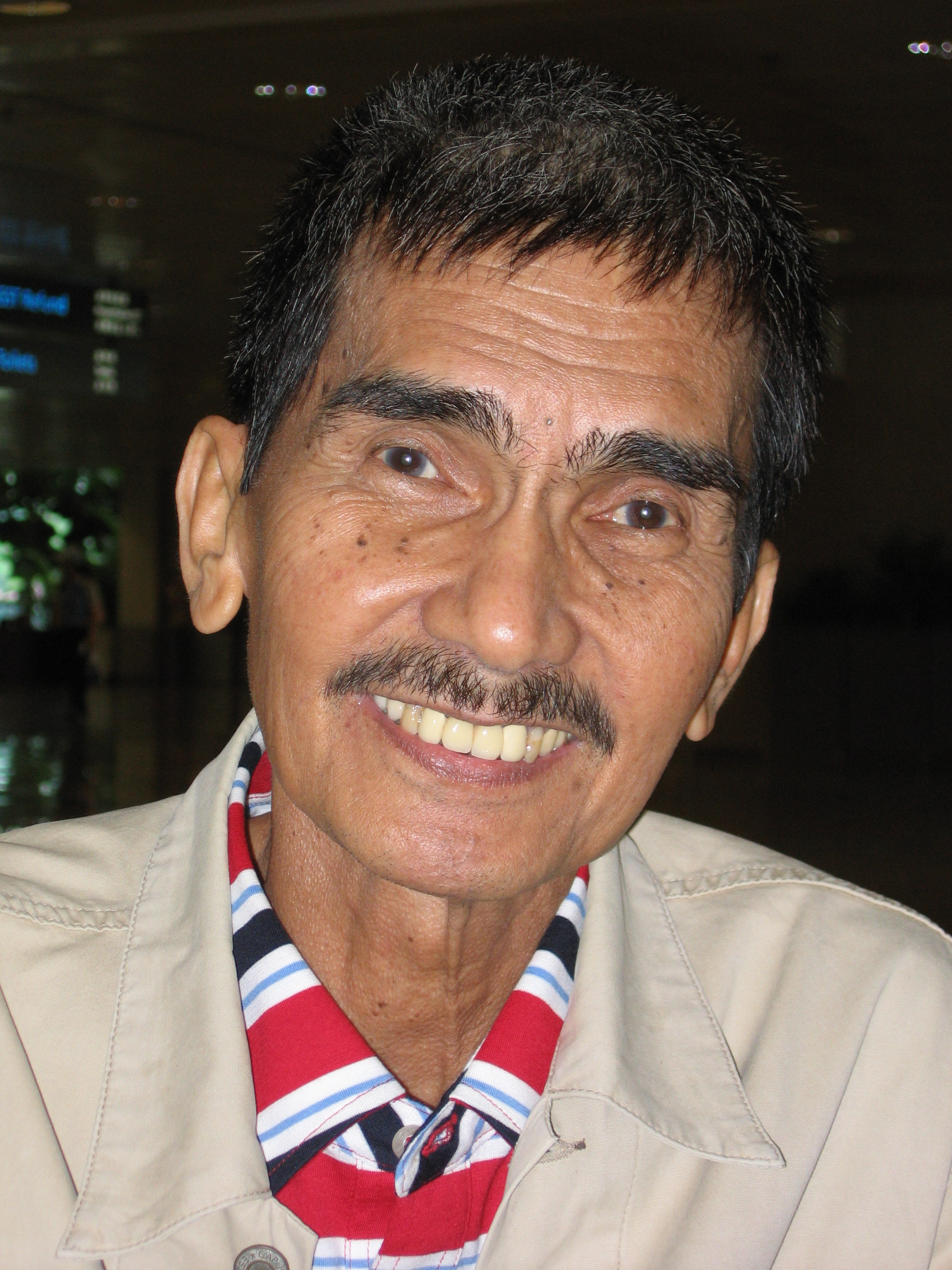
- Bobby A. Suarez in 2010
- Born: Roberto A. Suarez; November 27, 1942; Manila, Philippines
- Died: February 8, 2010 (aged 67)
- Occupations: Film director Screenwriter; Film producer
- Years active: 1969-2005

Roberto A. Suarez (November 27, 1942 – February 8, 2010), commonly referred to as "Bobby" or "BAS", was a Filipino film producer, director and screenwriter who achieved international recognition for movies now regarded as cult classics.

== Early life ==
Suarez had a humble beginning, selling items on the street to support a sick mother and 3 younger siblings from a young age. A Kalesa operator allowed his homeless family to stay beside a horse's stable for shelter. When his mother died, Suarez and his younger brother were taken to the Manila Boy's Town, a temporary refuge for abandoned and orphaned children. Once inside the orphanage, Suarez served as an altar boy and was sent out on the streets to sell items including newspapers, sampaguita flowers, and he also shined shoes. Suarez showed exemplary intelligence inside the orphanage, was a consistent leader of his group, and graduated valedictorian. When he reached puberty, he left the orphanage and worked as an errand boy at the Manila City Hall in the Office of the City Mayor of then-Mayor Arsenio Lacson.

== Career ==
=== Breaking into the Film Industry ===
To help pay for his college education, Suarez worked as a janitor-messenger for the Philippine branch of international movie distributor, J. Arthur Rank Film Distributors. Dependability and resourcefulness meant Suarez was soon promoted and eventually he became the company's assistant sales manager in 1963.

In 1965, Suarez was appointed Sales and Marketing Manager for Fortune Films, owned by retired general Macario Peralta Jr. before his film marketing expertise brought him to Hong Kong. There he established Intercontinental Film Distributors in 1969, serving as Managing Director. He pioneered dubbing of Chinese films into English language, selling them all over the world.

=== Debut as a Director ===
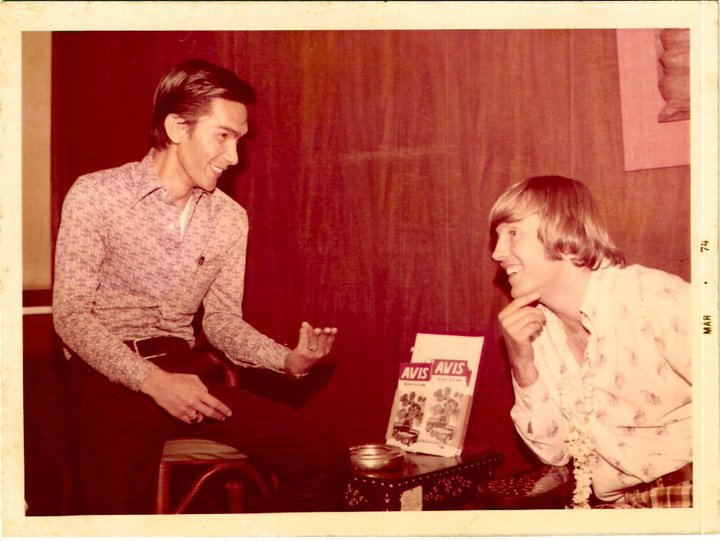

During this time, Suarez became close to legendary Spanish filmmaker Sr. Don Antonio Isasi-Isasmendi, and learned the rudiments of movie directing. Armed with this new skill, and to help meet the growing demand for movies worldwide, Suarez next ventured into producing and directing movies, creating many low-budget quality English films featuring both Caucasian and Asian actors. Suarez's directorial debut was the movie "They Call Her Cleopatra Wong" using the pseudonym "George Richardson". Suarez movies were sold worldwide, with some movies even landing in the Top 50 Grossing Films during its theatrical release in the US and Canada, which are considered to be the most sophisticated and hard-to-penetrate markets. Today, these movies are considered cult classics, inspiring Hollywood directors including Quentin Tarantino.

In the early 1980s, Suarez said he was working on a film meant to star Weng Weng and Marrie Lee that never materialized.

=== Later career ===
In 1990, Suarez was given a special award by the European Publishers. He was awarded the Gregorio Valdez Memorial Award and the Ciriaco Santiago Memorial Award both by the Filipino Academy of Motion Picture Arts and Sciences(FAMAS). The Ciriaco Santiago Memorial Award was given to honor performers and directors of productions who have gained international recognition for their cinematic excellence. In February 2006, The Singapore Straits Times gave Mr. Suarez a special award for his contribution in helping place Singapore in the Movie World Map. In December of that same year, he was given a Lifetime Achievement Award by the International Academy of Film and Television for helping put the Philippines in the Movie World Map.

He is a member of several national film organizations including the Writer's Guild of the Philippines, the Director's Guild of the Philippines, the Writers Guild of America-West, the Independent Movie Producers Importers Distributors Association of the Philippines (IMPIDAP), and the Philippine Motion Pictures Producers Association (PMPPA).

Up until his passing, Suarez tried to find funding for a Cleopatra Wong sequel, and a catholic film named The Girl that saw Jesus come down from the Cross.

== Death ==
Suarez died on February 8, 2010, after a series of heart attacks and a kidney operation. He was survived by his wife, Gene, their children and grandchildren.

== Filmography ==
Producer

- Prodigal Boxer (1972)
- King Boxer (1972)
- Scotch on the Rocks to Forget Black Coffee to Remember (1973)
- Cosa Nostra Asia (1973)
- Black Dragon (1974)
- Master Samurai (1975)
- They Call Him Chop Suey (1976)
- Bionic Boy (1977)
- They Call Her Cleopatra Wong (1978)
- Dynamite Johnson/Bionic Boy Part 2 (1979)
- Devils Angels/Devil's Three/Pay Or Die (1980)
- The One-Armed Executioner (1983)
- Warriors of the Apocalypse/ Searchers Of The Voodoo Mountain/ Time Raiders (1985)
- American Commandos (1986)
- Red Roses For A Call Girl/ Manila Tattoo/ The Last Deal (1989)
- Obsessed (2003)
- Crying Ladies (2004) Co-Executive Producer

Writer

- Scotch on the Rocks to Forget Black Coffee to Remember (1973)
- Black Dragon (1974)
- Master Samurai (1975)
- They Call Him Chop Suey (1976)
- Bionic Boy (1977)
- They Call Her Cleopatra Wong (1978)
- Dynamite Johnson/Bionic Boy Part 2 (1979)
- Devils Angels/Devil's Three/Pay Or Die (1980)
- The One-Armed Executioner (1983)
- Warriors of the Apocalypse/Searchers Of The Voodoo Mountain/Time Raiders (1985)
- American Commandos (1986)
- Red Roses For A Call Girl/Manila Tattoo/The Last Deal (1989)
- Obsessed (2003)

Director

- They Call Her Cleopatra Wong (credited as George Richardson) (1978)
- Dynamite Johnson/Bionic Boy Part 2 (1979)
- Devils Angels/Devil's Three/Pay Or Die (1980)
- The One-Armed Executioner (1983)
- Rhapsody in Wood (Documentary) (1984)
- Warriors of the Apocalypse/Searchers Of The Voodoo Mountain/Time Raiders (1985)
- American Commandos (1986)
- Red Roses For A Call Girl/Manila Tattoo/The Last Deal (1989)
- Obsessed (2003)

Interview

- The Search for Weng Weng (2013)

Special thanks

- Closer to Home (1995)
