= Reminiscing =

1978 single by Little River Band

- International vinyl picture sleeve

Single by Little River Band

from the album Sleeper Catcher
- B-side: "Take Me Home"/"So Many Paths"
- Released: June 1978
- Genre: Soft rock; yacht rock
- Length: 4:11 (album version); 3:29 (single version)
- Label: EMI Music
- Songwriter: Graeham Goble
- Producers: John Boylan, Little River Band

Little River Band singles chronology
| "Shut Down Turn Off" (1978) | "Reminiscing" (1978) | "Lady" (1978) |

"Reminiscing" is a song by Australian soft rock music group Little River Band, released in June 1978 as the second single from their fourth studio album Sleeper Catcher. The song was written by the band's rhythm guitarist Graeham Goble, and sung by their lead singer Glenn Shorrock. "Reminiscing" peaked at number 35 on the Australian Kent Music Report and at No. 3 on the Billboard Hot 100.

== Background and recording ==
In 2005, Goble spoke of his inspiration and recording of the song, saying "I loved watching old black and white movies, and I always also loved the music of Glenn Miller and Cole Porter, that whole era of writing, and it was my attempt to write a song to depict the romantic era. It came out very quickly, I wrote it in about half an hour. Even though a lot of people think it sounds complicated, on the guitar it's very simple to play. It nearly never got recorded – when the time came to record it, the keyboard player I wanted to use, Peter Jones, was out of town, so we cut the band track with a different keyboard player. It didn't work. A few days later when we tried it again with a different keyboard player, again it didn't work, and the band was losing interest in the song. Just before the album was finished, Peter Jones came back into town, the band and I had an argument because I wanted to give Reminiscing a third chance. Peter played on it, we cut it, and finished it, and sent the album to Capitol. Capitol said that they couldn't hear any singles on the album, and didn't know what to release. Five weeks later, someone at Capitol's New York office said 'You're all crazy, Reminiscing is a smash.' Capitol put it out, and it just immediately caught on fire, and became our highest chart hit." Goble added "It's quite staggering; you don't realise you've written something like that until it happens, until it's history."

== Reception ==
Record World called it "a highly danceable ballad" and praised the lead vocal performance.

== Impact and legacy ==
The song was a hit in the US, peaking at number three, but did not achieve the same success in the band's home territory, peaking at number 35. Nevertheless, at the Australian 1978 King of Pop Awards, the song won Australian Record of the Year.

"Reminiscing" was given a BMI Five Million-Air award for five million plays on US radio—the highest achievement ever for any Australian popular song.

According to Albert Goldman's biography, John Lennon named "Reminiscing" as one of his favourite songs. May Pang, erstwhile girlfriend of Lennon, said "Oddly, with all the fantastic music he wrote, "our song" was 'Reminiscing' by the Little River Band."

Besides John Lennon, another famous musician who reportedly loved the song was Frank Sinatra. According to Goble, Sinatra thought that "Reminiscing" was one of the best songs of the '70s.

== Track listings ==
Australian 7-inch

A. "Reminiscing" – 4:11
B. "Take Me Home" (Recorded Live at The Rainbow Theatre, London)

New Zealand 7-inch

A. "Reminiscing" – 3:26
B. "So Many Paths" – 4:22

North American 7-inch

A. "Reminiscing" – 3:26
B. "So Many Paths" – 4:22

== Charts ==
=== Weekly charts ===
| Chart (1978) | Peak position |
|---|---|
| Australia (Kent Music Report) | 35 |
| Canada Top Singles (RPM) | 3 |
| Canada (RPM Adult Contemporary) | 1 |
| New Zealand (Recorded Music NZ) | 17 |
| U.S. (Billboard Hot 100) | 3 |
| U.S. (Easy Listening) | 10 |

=== Year-end charts ===
| Chart (1978) | Rank |
|---|---|
| Canada (RPM Top Singles) | 34 |
| U.S. (Billboard Hot 100) | 65 |
| U.S. (Cash Box) | 30 |

== Madison Avenue version ==
"Reminiscing"

Single by Madison Avenue

from the album The Polyester Embassy
- B-side: "It's Alright"
- Released: 5 March 2001
- Length: 3:35
- Label: EMI International
- Songwriter: Graeham Goble
- Producer: Andy Van Dorsselaer

Madison Avenue singles chronology
| "Everything You Need" (2000) | "Reminiscing" (2001) |

Australian group Madison Avenue covered the song and released it as a single in March 2001. Their version peaked at number nine in Australia and was certified gold by the Australian Recording Industry Association (ARIA).

=== Track listing ===
Australian CD single

1. "Reminiscing" (Da Classic remix – Edit) – 3:31
2. "Reminiscing" (original mix – edit) – 3:24
3. "Everything You Need" (Olav Basoski remix) – 7:32
4. "Reminiscing" (Da Classic remix) – 5:06
5. "It's Alright" (album mix) – 5:12

=== Charts ===
| Chart (2001) | Peak position |
|---|---|
| Australia (ARIA) | 9 |

==== Year-end charts ====
| Chart (2001) | Peak position |
|---|---|
| Australia (Australian Artist) | 9 |

=== Certifications ===
| Region | Certification | Certified units/sales |
|---|---|---|
| Australia (ARIA) | Gold | 35,000^{^} |
^{^} Shipments figures based on certification alone.

== Other versions ==
- In July 1978, Shorrock recorded a Spanish-language version of the song, titled "Recordando", using the original backing track and backing vocals.
- Thumbs Carllile recorded a jazz cover on his 1979 album Guitar Wizard.
- Barry Manilow covered the song for his 1996 album Summer of '78.
- Tommy Emmanuel's covered the song for his 1998 album Collaboration featuring Shorrock.
- Goble, Shorrock and Beeb Birtles, three of the original members of Little River Band, who reformed under the name Birtles Shorrock Goble, recorded "Reminiscing" for their 2003 CD and DVD Full Circle.
- Carl Riseley included a jazz cover of the song on his 2008 album The Rise.
- k.d. lang recorded the song for the Australian version of her 2011 album Sing It Loud.
- Shorrock rerecorded "Reminiscing" for his 2019 album Glenn Shorrock Sings Little River Band.

== Samples ==
Biz Markie sampled the song for his song "Throwback" on the album Weekend Warrior.

== In popular culture ==
- During American Idol's 2007 broadcast of Idol Gives Back, Ben Stiller jokingly threatened to sing the song nonstop until $200 billion in donations was achieved.
- The song is featured in the Freaks and Geeks episode "Kim Kelly Is My Friend."
- The song is featured in the film Monsters vs. Aliens.
- The song is heard playing in the background during a scene in Knocked Up with Seth Rogen and Paul Rudd at a Las Vegas hotel room.
- The song was used in the 2010 film The Other Guys and "Little River Band" credited by Will Ferrell's character before the CD is trashed by Mark Wahlberg's character. The Other Guy was the title of another LRB hit.
- The song was used in the episode of The Middle titled Taking Back The House.
- The song is featured in the HBO series Divorce.
- The song was used as a bumper for Tom Hatten's Family Film Festival.
