= Coma (Pendulum song) =

Single by Pendulum

from the album 3 Knocks
- Released: July 1997
- Genre: Ambient house
- Length: 6:46
- Label: Vicious Vinyl
- Songwriter(s): Julian Werner, Noel Michaelovich
- Producer(s): Pendulum

Pendulum singles chronology
"Awesome Party/Insecurity" (1995)	"Coma" (1997)

"Coma" is a song by Australian ambient house group Pendulum; it was released in July 1997 as the third and final single from the group's album, 3 Knocks. "Coma" peaked at number 46 on the ARIA Charts and featured in the Triple J Hottest 100, 1997.

At the ARIA Music Awards of 1997, the song won Best Dance Release.

The song contains the lyrics "Hug me till you drug me, honey; Kiss me till I'm in a Coma", from the novel Brave New World and from Natural Born Killers, and the lines "Ever since I was born, I've been trained to serve you" and "Am I not all you dreamed I would be?" from the film Coming to America, The song also Samples a sound from the film A Clockwork Orange, the "doorbell ring" after the home invasion.

== Track listing ==
CD Maxi (VV12032CD)
No.	Title	Length
1.	"Coma"	6:46
2.	"Ever Since I Was Born" (Drum and Bass Mix)	7:11
3.	"I Am Not" (Arden's Big Blue Remix)	9:17
4.	"Coma" (Sgt Slick's Trakattack)	7:50 co
5.	"Coma" (Vicious Remix)	9:26
6.	"Coma" (edit)	4:32
7.	"Coma" (Vicious remix edit)	4:29

== Charts ==
Chart (1997)	Peak position
Australia (ARIA)	46
