= Patrick (2013 film) =

Australian film directed by Mark Hartley

- Theatrical film poster
- Directed by: Mark Hartley
- Written by: Justin King
- Story by: Justin King; Mark Hartley; Ray Boseley; Antony I. Ginnane
- Based on: Patrick by Everett De Roche; Richard Franklin
- Produced by: Antony I. Ginnane
- Starring: Charles Dance; Rachel Griffiths; Sharni Vinson
- Cinematography: Garry Richards
- Edited by: Jane Moran
- Music by: Pino Donaggio
- Production companies: Screen Australia; F.G. Film Productions; Film Victoria; Melbourne International Film Festival Premiere Fund; Screen Queensland; Head Gear Films; Metrol Technology; Roget Clinic; Cherryhill Holdings; PDER
- Distributed by: Umbrella Entertainment
- Release date: 27 July 2013 (Melbourne International Film Festival)
- Running time: 96 minutes
- Country: Australia
- Language: English

Patrick (released internationally as Patrick: Evil Awakens) is a 2013 Australian supernatural horror film directed by Mark Hartley and a remake of the 1978 film of the same name.

The movie stars Jackson Gallagher as the titular Patrick, a comatose young man who uses his psychic powers to stalk a nurse caring for him.

== Plot ==
Kathy (Sharni Vinson), a young nurse, is eager to prove herself in her new job in an isolated psychiatric clinic. She is intrigued by Patrick (Jackson Gallagher), a comatose patient whom her boss Dr. Roget (Charles Dance) assures her is incapable of truly responding to any external stimuli.

Kathy is horrified by the experiments that Roget and his nurse Matron Cassidy (Rachel Griffiths) inflict upon Patrick, and she is initially pleased when she finds a way to communicate with him. This quickly turns to horror when Patrick uses his psychic abilities to interfere with her life outside of the hospital, as Patrick has grown obsessed with Kathy and will harm anyone he deems to be interfering with his relationship with her.

== Cast ==
- Sharni Vinson as Kathy Jacquar
- Rachel Griffiths as Matron Cassidy
- Charles Dance as Doctor Roget
- Peta Sergeant as Nurse Williams
- Eliza Taylor as Nurse Panicale
- Martin Crewes as Brian Wright
- Damon Gameau as Ed Penhaligon
- Jackson Gallagher as Patrick
- Rod Mullinar as Morris
- Simone Buchanan as Patrick's Mother
- Maria Mercedes as Ed's doctor

== Production ==
The film is a remake of the 1978 Ozploitation film of the same name. Director Mark Hartley's first film, 2008's Not Quite Hollywood: The Wild, Untold Story of Ozploitation! explored the Ozploitation genre.

Richard E. Grant was originally cast as the doctor but had to drop out because of a scheduling conflict.

== Release ==
=== Cinemas ===
The film had its world premiere on 27 July 2013 at the Melbourne International Film Festival and received a limited theatrical release on 14 March 2014, followed by a DVD release the following month. Its Canadian theatrical premiere was at the Lost Episode Festival Toronto on 5 July 2014.

=== Home media ===
Patrick was released on DVD and Blu-ray by Phase 4 Films on 10 June 2014.

== Reception ==
On review aggregator Rotten Tomatoes, Patrick holds an approval rating of 73% based on 22 reviews, and an average rating of 5.30/10. On Metacritic, the film has a weighted average score of 48 out of 100 based on 4 critic reviews, indicating "mixed or average reviews".

The Hollywood Reporter rated it favorably, summing it up with the tagline "This Ozploitation remake is a spookily effective fright-fest." The Guardian gave a predominantly favorable but mixed review, praising the cast's acting overall while noting that the film erred in overdoing the film's shocks and doing them too early. Richard Kuipers from Variety gave the film a positive review, praising Vinson's performance, gothic atmosphere, while noting the film's occasionally wobbly dialogue. Drew Tinnin from Dread Central rated the film a score of 3.5 out of 5, stating that director Hartley "his remake of one of those films exhibits the same understanding of how to craft an effective horror film that's decidedly over-the-top while still retaining the same atmosphere that made the original Patrick worth documenting in the first place."

Clifford Wheatley from IGN wrote, "Patrick: Evil Awakens offers some talented actors doing their best with lacklustre material, peppered with some amusing practical make-up effects, but offers nothing of substance to make this a movie worth spending your money on. It's late-night cable fodder at the very best." Simon Abrams on Roger Ebert.com awarded the film a mixed 2.5 out of 4 stars, commending the film's score, script; while criticizing the film's dialogue, and direction as being "often unnecessarily over-determined".

=== Accolades ===
Award	Category	Subject	Result
AFCA Awards	Best Actress	Sharni Vinson	Nominated
AFCA Awards	Best Supporting Actor	Charles Dance	Nominated

== See also ==
- Cinema of Australia
