= John Course =

Australian DJ and record producer

- Born: John Course
- Origin: Melbourne, Australia
- Genres: House, electronic dance music
- Occupations: DJ, record producer, entrepreneur
- Years active: 1980s–present
- Labels: Vicious Recordings, Ministry of Sound Australia
- Website: www.johncourse.com

John Course is an Australian DJ, record producer, and music industry executive. He is best known as the co-founder of Vicious Recordings (formerly Vicious Vinyl), a label credited with launching the international careers of Madison Avenue, Dirty South, and Peking Duk. Course is a central figure in the history of Australian dance music, having sold over one million compilation albums through the Ministry of Sound Australia brand.

== Career ==
=== Early years and residency ===
Course first rose to prominence in the late 1980s as a resident DJ at Melbourne's **Chevron** nightclub, where he headlined influential nights such as "Sanction" and "Insanity." During this period, he won the Victorian state titles for the DMC World DJ Championships in both 1988 and 1989. In 1993, Course was featured in the inaugural DJ Mag Top 100 DJs poll, an alphabetical listing of the world's most influential selectors at the time.

=== Vicious Recordings ===
In 1990, Course co-founded Vicious Vinyl (now Vicious Recordings) alongside Andy Van and Colin Daniels. Serving as the label group's General Manager, Course oversaw the A&R and commercial strategy for the label's sub-imprint, Vicious Grooves. In this capacity, he played a central role in the development of Madison Avenue, whose debut single "Don't Call Me Baby" (1999) became a global success, reaching number one on the UK Singles Chart. Under his management, the label group also signed early works by future international stars, most notably Swedish producer Avicii.

=== Media and radio ===
Course has maintained a presence in Australian media for over three decades:

- Radio: He hosted the nationally syndicated NightBeat Australia in the 1990s and later co-hosted the Novanation show on the Nova network for over seven years, which was one of the highest-rated dance music programs in the country.
- Webcasting: In 2020, he launched the "Club Classics and Future Anthems" webcast, which ran for over 60 consecutive weeks during the COVID-19 pandemic, attracting a global audience of house music enthusiasts.

== Production and collaborations ==
Course has released music under his own name, as well as several collaborative projects and aliases:

- Blackout: A project with Andy Van and John Curtin. Their 1998 single "Gotta Have Hope" was a global club success, peaking at number 46 on the UK Singles Chart.
- Electro Funk Lovers: A production duo with Andy Van, focusing on house and nu-disco.
- Solo Work and Aliases: Course produces underground house under the alias J.A.C. In 2020 he released single "Just A Little", a cover of the Liberty X hit.
- Collaborations with Sgt Slick: Course has collaborated extensively with fellow Australian producer Sgt Slick on tracks including "Love Is" (2021) and "Love Vision" (2021), as well as providing a "Club Dub" for the Gold-accredited "Gimme! Gimme! Gimme!" (Sgt Slick's Melbourne Recut).

== Recognition and awards ==
- DMC Mixing Championships: Victorian State Winner (1988, 1989).
- DJ Mag Top 100: Ranked in the inaugural 1993 global poll.
