= Weng Weng =

Filipino actor and martial artist (1957–1992)

- Weng Weng in 1982
- Born: Ernesto de Guzman de la Cruz; September 7, 1957; Parañaque, Rizal, Philippines
- Died: August 29, 1992 (aged 34); Pasay, Philippines
- Occupations: Actor, martial artist
- Years active: 1972–1984
- Height: 83 cm (2 ft 9 in)

Ernesto de Guzman de la Cruz (according to his nephew, his middle name is de la Cruz) (September 7, 1957 – August 29, 1992), known by the stage name Weng Weng, was a Filipino actor, stunt performer, and martial artist. He had dwarfism. Born in what is now Baclaran in Parañaque, dela Cruz studied karate. In the mid-1970s, dela Cruz played supporting roles in films, until his first starring role in Agent OO (1981). At the Manila International Film Festival, dela Cruz's starring role in the Agent OO's sequel For Y'ur Height Only (1981) outsold every other local production on foreign sales.

Following this, dela Cruz appeared in the D'Wild Wild Weng (1982), The Impossible Kid (1982), as Agent OO, and The Cute... The Sexy n' The Tiny alongside Berting Labra and Pia Moran. Eventually, his managers Peter and Cora Caballes changed professional paths and dela Cruz never worked again in the media industry. In July 1986, Dela Cruz was present at a coup attempt against the Aquino administration at the Manila Hotel. Dela Cruz spent the rest of his life with his family in Baclaran and died at the age of 34 in 1992.

Dela Cruz has since become a cult film icon after some of his films went viral. By the 2000s, a lot of information published about him was vague. Research about his life led to the making of two successful documentaries: Machete Maidens Unleashed! (2010), and The Search for Weng Weng (2013).

== Early life ==
Dela Cruz was born to Felicito Jose dela Cruz, an electrician (1914–1968), and Rita De Guzman dela Cruz, a laundry woman (1919–1989), the youngest of five brothers, on September 7, 1957. As described by dela Cruz's brother Celing, his early life went as follows. When his mother was pregnant, she didn't know until the doctor informed her, and when she gave birth, his size was "no bigger than a small Coke bottle". His premature state forced dela Cruz's parents to place him in a shoe box under a light as a rudimentary incubator, feeding him with a dropper. With a medical condition known as primordial dwarfism, it caused him to reach the height of only 2 feet 9 inches (0.83 meters) tall. Being devout Catholics, dela Cruz's mother showed their devotion to their faith by dressing and parading a young dela Cruz as Santo Niño each year for the annual Baclaran parade. Dela Cruz became popular in the neighborhood and his mother felt he should become an actor. In 1968, dela Cruz's father died after falling down a ladder at work.

According to Celing, as a child dela Cruz was fascinated with action films and started to study them. Neighbours of dela Cruz began to notice him climbing on clothing lines doing acrobatics and pull-ups. Dela Cruz joined karate classes, where he learned quickly, and impressed his instructor, so much so that the instructor would perform demonstrations with dela Cruz to promote the school. During one of these demonstrations, dela Cruz was noticed by producer and actor Peter Caballes of Liliw Productions. Dela Cruz's mother, who had a hard time raising five boys, allowed him and his wife Cora to take dela Cruz under their helm for an acting career.

== Career ==
=== 1975–1981: Early roles and breakthrough ===
Dela Cruz began to work almost exclusively with Liliw Productions. He began with an uncredited role in Silakbo, released October 17, 1975.

In 1976, dela Cruz received his first billing as Weng Weng, which would be his pseudonym for the rest of his career, when he co-starred in Silang Matatapang and Sila...Sa Bawat Bangketa.

In 1978, dela Cruz shared the top billing with actor Ramon Zamora in Chopsuey Meets Big Time Papa.

Comic actor Rodolfo Vera Quizon Sr., better known as Dolphy, was friends with Peter Caballes, who introduced him to dela Cruz. Quizon felt he could use dela Cruz in a comedy film and hired him to act for his company RVQ Productions. Their first collaboration was The Quick Brown Fox. Dela Cruz played Quizon's sidekick. The movie was released on November 6, 1980.

On February 13, 1981, Stariray premiered. Dela Cruz plays a supporting role, in a comedy starring Quizon. On May 29, Agent 00 was released. In it dela Cruz plays the lead as Agent OO. On June 12, Da Best In Da West was released. Starring Quizon, with dela Cruz in a minor role. On July 2, the musical film Legs... Katawan... Babae! premiered. Dela Cruz makes a cameo. For Your Height Only was released on September 2, with dela Cruz returning as secret Agent OO. At the Manila International Film Festival, the film outsold every other local productions for international distribution.

=== 1982–1986: action film star ===
On March 25, 1982, D'Wild Wild Weng was released, starring dela Cruz. On July 23, The Impossible Kid premiered, with dela Cruz returning in the role of Agent OO. On December 25, dela Cruz shared the top billing with Berting Labra and Pia Moran in The Cute... The Sexy n' The Tiny.

During this time, dela Cruz was announced as one of the supporting actors in Tatak: Magnum (1983), but he is not in the finished film.

In July 1986, five months after the People Power Revolution overthrew President Ferdinand Marcos, a coup attempt led by Arturo Tolentino occurred against the administration of President Corazon Aquino, in which soldiers briefly occupied the Manila Hotel; dela Cruz was observed to have been at the hotel during the coup attempt.

No public appearance by dela Cruz are known after 1986.

=== 1987–1992: return to obscurity and death ===
Peter and Cora Caballes retired from filmmaking circa 1987, and dela Cruz returned to his hometown, under the care of his family.

=== 1993–present day: posthumous success and aftermath ===
After his death, Weng Weng films gained a cult status. Details on dela Cruz's life were vague, while some claims have a base in reality, some of it is myth. The discoveries about him led to the release of two documentaries Machete Maidens Unleashed! (2010) which focuses on Philippine's film during his active years. The second one about him, The Search for Weng Weng (2013). Both films were well received.

Research made showed that dela Cruz's films Agent OO and The Cute... The Sexy n' The Tiny are lost. The U-matic master tape of ABS-CBN Dolphy's The Quick Brown Fox disintegrated upon its last screening.

== Death ==
On August 29, 1992, one week and a day short of his 35th birthday, Ernesto dela Cruz, age 34, died in Pasay, of a heart attack due to hypertension.

(According to his nephew, he died of a stroke.)

== Works cited ==
- Hartley, Mark. Machete Maidens Unleashed! (DVD). Umbrella Entertainment.
- Leavold, Andrew. The Search for Weng Weng (DVD). Wild Eye Releasing.
- Leavold, Andrew. The Search for Weng Weng (Book). Australia: The LedaTape Organisation, 2017. ISBN 9780994411235
