= I've Got Your Number (Cheyne Coates song) =

Single by Cheyne

from the album Something Wicked This Way Comes
- A-side: "I've Got Your Number"
- Released: 19 April 2004
- Genre: Dance
- Label: Aperitif
- Songwriter(s): Cheyne Coates

Cheyne singles chronology
"I've Got Your Number" (2004)	"Taste You" (2004)

"I've Got Your Number" is the debut solo single by Australian singer Cheyne Coates, after her departure from duo dance band Madison Avenue.

== Track listing ==
- CD Single
1. I've Got Your Number (Original)
2. I've Got Your Number (Rogue Traders Mix)
3. I've Got Your Number (16th Element Mix)
4. I've Got Your Number (Emc remix)
5. I've Got Your Number (A Cappella)

== Charts ==
Chart (2004)	Peak position
ARIA Singles Chart	26
ARIA Australian Singles Chart	5
ARIA Club Chart	10
