= Taste You (Cheyne song) =

Single by Cheyne

from the album Something Wicked This Way Comes
- A-side: "Taste You"
- Released: 19 July 2004
- Genre: Dance
- Label: Aperitif
- Songwriter(s): Cheyne Coates, Brian Canham

Cheyne singles chronology
"I've Got Your Number" (2004)	"Taste You" (2004)

"Taste You" is the second and final single to be taken from Australian singer Cheyne Coates debut album.

== Track listing ==
- CD Single
1. Taste You (Radio edit)
2. Taste You (Emc mix)
3. Taste You (Sweeter Than Bee Pollen mix)
4. Taste You (Alleycat Mix)
5. I've Got Your Number (Original)

== Charts ==
Chart (2004)	Peak position
ARIA Singles Chart	69
ARIA Australian Singles Chart	20
