= They Call Her Cleopatra Wong =

- Movie poster
- Directed by: Bobby A. Suarez
- Written by: Romeo N. Galang; Bobby A. Suarez
- Produced by: Bobby A. Suarez
- Starring: Marrie Lee; George Estregan
- Cinematography: David Hung
- Music by: Romeo N. Galang
- Distributed by: BAS Film Productions
- Release date: 1978
- Running time: 111 minutes
- Countries: Singapore; Philippines
- Language: English

They Call Her... Cleopatra Wong (also known as Cleopatra Wong and Female Big Boss) is a 1978 Philippine-Singaporean international co-production film directed by Bobby A. Suarez and co-written by Suarez and Romeo N. Galang. It features the first adventure of Asian Interpol agent Cleopatra Wong, starring Marrie Lee in the title role, together with Franco Guerrero, Dante Varonna and George Estregan. The film, riding on the success of Hong Kong martial arts films of the era as well as the Cleopatra Jones, James Bond and superspy craze, details the adventures of the first and only Singaporean female Interpol agent. The film is reportedly listed by cult director Quentin Tarantino as among those that inspired him. Two sequels were filmed in the Philippines.

== Plot ==
Cleopatra Wong is a deadly female Interpol agent, with the title sequence displaying her prowess at marksmanship, archery and unarmed combat. She is interrupted while on holiday in Manila by the Chief in Singapore, asking her to see the local Chief, in the Philippines.

Cleopatra is informed of a counterfeit plot, where bogus currency is so realistic that it is being freely distributed by a crime syndicate in five ASEAN countries, hoping to make the people lose faith in their currencies and consequently throw the region into financial chaos. Following which, they will attempt to buy over various companies and make huge profits.

Cleopatra is sent back to Singapore where the currency is already being accepted by the major banks. She teams up with her young friend and fellow junior agent, and attempts to spend the counterfeit money so she is captured by the gang responsible. She is taken to their hideout and encounters menacing wrestlers, whom she easily defeats. A chase around Singapore then ensues, including a fight scene in Sentosa island. At last, the gang is defeated and is taken for interrogation.

Following a tip gathered from the interrogation, Cleopatra sets off to Hong Kong, where the money is reported coming from. At the harbour, she spots a suspicious-looking shipment of strawberry jam, and discovers that the fake currency is being smuggled inside jars of this jam. A fight scene follows, and Cleopatra calls the chief, teasingly telling him to go into the strawberry jam market.

Cleopatra returns to the Philippines, where the jam shipment originated. Posing as a reporter for Asian Weekly, she visits a strawberry plantation. The farmer tells her that the main manufacturers of the jam in the area are nuns in a Catholic monastery on a nearby hill, who have recently taken over Marcus. Thanking him, she goes off to investigate. Cleopatra tries the same trick, but is shooed off by the "nuns". However, she does manage to take a few photographs and spots a helicopter nearby.

She requests a warrant to search the monastery from the local Interpol chief, but he argues that the evidence is insufficient. Cleopatra then goes to develop the photographs, only to encounter thugs on the way. The photographs show the nuns carrying automatic machine guns, which is enough evidence for the chief.

The "nuns" and "monks" are, in reality, members of the syndicate whilst the real nuns are locked captive in the basement. Cleopatra and the team infiltrate the area, with massive gun battles and explosions as the result. Finally, she corners the escaping syndicate member escaping on his helicopter. Using three explosive arrows, she blows the chopper up. The rest of the impostors are dispatched of by her teammates, and the monastery is saved.

== Tagline ==
She purrs like a kitten and makes love like a siren. This side of the pacific, she is the meanest, deadliest and sexiest secret agent.

== Sequels ==
- Dynamite Johnson (1979)
- Devil's Angels (1980)

== Restoration ==
It had been thought that all prints of the film were lost and that the only surviving copies of the film were videotape. However, in 2021 the film was restored based on two copies from international archives: a 35mm German-dubbed release print from the collection of Filmarchiv Austria, and a 16mm release print with the original sound but burned-in Danish subtitles from the Danish Film Institute.
