= Madison Avenue (band) =

Australian electronic music duo

- Origin: Melbourne, Victoria, Australia
- Genres: Electronic; house; nu-disco
- Years active: 1999–2003
- Labels: Vicious; Virgin
- Past members: Cheyne Coates; Andy Van Dorsselaer

Madison Avenue were an Australian electronic music duo consisting of writer-producer Andy Van Dorsselaer and singer-lyricist Cheyne Coates. Madison Avenue is best known for the song "Don't Call Me Baby" (October 1999), which peaked at number two on the ARIA Singles Chart in 1999 and topped the charts in New Zealand and the United Kingdom in 2000. At the ARIA Music Awards of 2000 they won Single of the Year, Highest Selling Single and Breakthrough Artist – Single for "Don't Call Me Baby" as well as Best Video for Mark Hartley's direction of "Who the Hell Are You".

== History ==
Before joining Madison Avenue, Cheyne Coates was working as a choreographer and singer in Melbourne. She met producer and writer Andy Van Dorsselaer (aka Andy Van) in a dance club. Van was the founder of the Vicious Vinyl record label and had remix credits for Tina Arena and CDB. He had won an Australian Recording Industry Association (ARIA) award for his production work on "Coma" by Pendulum.

The duo started working together mainly as writers and producers in 1998. Madison Avenue recorded their first single, "Fly", featuring Kellie Wolfgram as lead vocalist. Coates sang lead on the group's breakthrough single, "Don't Call Me Baby" (October 1999): Van Dorsselaer preferred her version, even though it was initially used as the guide track for Wolfgram. "Don't Call Me Baby" peaked at number two on the ARIA Singles Chart in 1999. By December 2000 it was certified as triple platinum for the shipment of 210,000 units in Australia. The single was released internationally in 2000. In New Zealand, "Don't Call Me Baby" topped the New Zealand Singles Chart in April 2000. In the United Kingdom, the single topped the UK Singles Chart in May 2000, selling 400,000 copies in Britain. "Don't Call Me Baby" became the first single by an Australian group to top the charts in Britain since "Down Under" by Men at Work in February 1983, a feat it maintained for ten years until "We No Speak Americano" by Yolanda Be Cool and DCUP topped the UK Singles Chart in July 2010. The song was also a top ten hit in Greece and Ireland. Coates became the public face of the band, although they had intended to be a collective dance group like C&C Music Factory or Soul II Soul.

The group's only studio album, The Polyester Embassy, was released in 2000 and reached number 4 on the Australian album charts. It provided three other singles: "Who the Hell Are You?", a number-one hit in Australia, "Everything You Need", and "Reminiscing", a cover version of the 1978 hit written by Graeham Goble for the Little River Band. At the ARIA Music Awards of 2000 they won Single of the Year, Highest Selling Single and Breakthrough Artist – Single for "Don't Call Me Baby" as well as Best Video for Mark Hartley's direction of "Who the Hell Are You". They were also nominated for Best Group, Best Dance Release, Producer of the Year (for work by Van Dorsselaer and Coates) and Best Video (for direction by Hartley) for "Don't Call Me Baby". Madison Avenue won the Best Dance Artist award at the International Dance Awards in 2001 in Miami.

Madison Avenue broke up in 2003. Coates issued her debut solo single, "I've Got Your Number", in April 2004. She followed with a solo album, Something Wicked This Way Comes (October 2004). Soon after, she left the music performance industry and, according to Van Dorseelaer, "has a successful career writing songs for other people." Andy Van went on to create the band Vandalism.

== Personnel ==
- Cheyne Coates – vocals and lyrics
- Andy Van Dorsselaer – producer and writer

== Discography ==
=== Studio albums ===
List of studio albums, with selected details, chart positions and certifications
Title	Album details	Chart peak positions			Certifications (sales thresholds)
Title	Album details	AUS	JPN	UK	Certifications (sales thresholds)
The Polyester Embassy	Released: 2 October 2000; Label: Vicious Grooves; Format: CD	4	63	74	ARIA: Platinum

=== Singles ===
List of singles, with selected chart positions and certifications
Year	Title	Chart positions											Certifications	Album
Year	Title	AUS	FRA	NZ	NLD	NOR	SWE	SWI	UK	US	US Pop	US Dance	Certifications	Album
1999	"Don't Call Me Baby"	2	41	1	22	11	47	38	1	88	48	1	ARIA: 3× Platinum; BPI: Silver; RMNZ: Gold	The Polyester Embassy
2000	"Who the Hell Are You"	1	—	32	—	—	—	—	10	—	—	1	ARIA: Platinum	The Polyester Embassy
2000	"Everything You Need"	6	—	—	—	—	—	—	33	—	—	24	ARIA: Gold	The Polyester Embassy
2001	"Reminiscing"	9	—	—	—	—	—	—	—	—	—	—	ARIA: Gold	The Polyester Embassy

== Awards and nominations ==
=== ARIA Music Awards ===
The ARIA Music Awards is an annual awards ceremony that recognises excellence, innovation, and achievement across all genres of Australian music. They commenced in 1987.

Year	Nominee / work	Award	Result	Ref.
2000	"Don't Call Me Baby"	Breakthrough Artist – Single	Won	
2000	"Don't Call Me Baby"	Single of the Year	Won	
2000	"Don't Call Me Baby"	Highest Selling Single	Won	
2000	"Don't Call Me Baby"	Best Group	Nominated	
2000	"Don't Call Me Baby"	Best Dance Release	Nominated	
2000	Andy Van, Cheyne Coates for "Don't Call Me Baby"	Producer of the Year	Nominated	
2000	Mark Hartley for "Don't Call Me Baby"	Best Video	Won	
2000	Mark Hartley for "Who the Hell Are You"	Best Video	Nominated	
2001	The Polyester Embassy	Best Pop Release	Nominated	

=== International Dance Music Awards ===
Year	Nominee / work	Award	Result	Ref.
2001	Madison Avenue	Best New Dance Artist - Group	Won	
2001	Madison Avenue	Best Dance Artist - Group	Won	

== See also ==
- List of number-one dance hits (United States)
- List of artists who reached number one on the U.S. dance chart
- List of artists who reached number one on the Australian singles chart
