= Ma quale idea =

1980 single by Pino D'Angiò

Single by Pino D'Angiò

from the album ...Balla!
- B-side: "Lezione d'amore"
- Released: 1980
- Genre: Italo disco
- Length: 4:25 (album version); 4:20 (single version)
- Label: Ri-Fi
- Songwriter: Pino D'Angiò

Pino D'Angiò singles chronology
| "E' libero, scusi?" (1979) | "Ma quale idea" (1980) | "Un concerto da strapazzo (Scusate sono impazzito)" (1981) |

"Ma quale idea" ("But What Idea") is a song written and performed by Italian singer Pino D'Angiò from his debut studio album, ...Balla! (1981). The song was arranged by jazz musician Enrico Intra. The single was an international success, selling over 2 million copies. Despite the common belief that the bassline of the track was taken from "Ain't No Stoppin' Us Now" by McFadden & Whitehead, D'Angiò claimed that he composed it independently along with the bassist Stefano Cerri. The song was later sampled in Madison Avenue's 1999 hit "Don't Call Me Baby".

== Track listing and formats ==
- Italian 7-inch single

A. "Ma quale idea" – 4:20
B. "Lezione d'amore" – 2:58

== Credits and personnel ==
- Pino D'Angiò – songwriter, vocals
- Enrico Intra – arranger
- Alfredo Di Muro – engineering

Credits and personnel adapted from the ...Balla! album and 7-inch single liner notes.

== Charts ==
=== Weekly charts ===
Weekly chart performance for "Ma quale idea"
| Chart (1981) | Peak position |
|---|---|
| Belgium (Ultratop 50 Flanders) | 9 |
| Italy (Musica e dischi) | 21 |
| Netherlands (Dutch Top 40) | 3 |
| Netherlands (Single Top 100) | 2 |
| Spain (Promusicae) | 1 |
| Switzerland (Schweizer Hitparade) | 5 |

=== Year-end charts ===
Year-end chart performance for "Ma quale idea"
| Chart (1981) | Position |
|---|---|
| Belgium (Ultratop 50 Flanders) | 87 |
| Netherlands (Dutch Top 40) | 49 |
| Netherlands (Single Top 100) | 67 |

== Francesco Napoli version ==
"Ma quale idea"

Single by Francesco Napoli

from the album Balla... The First Dance
- B-side: "Bambina che sará"
- Released: 1987
- Genre: Italo disco
- Length: 4:26
- Label: BCM
- Songwriter: Pino D'Angiò
- Producer: Peter Columbus

Francesco Napoli singles chronology
| "Stai con me" (1986) | "Ma quale idea" (1987) | "Piano, Piano" (1987) |

In 1987, Italian singer Francesco Napoli recorded a cover of "Ma quale idea".

=== Track listing and formats ===
- European 7-inch single

A. "Ma quale idea" – 4:26
B. "Bambina che sará" – 3:20

- European 12-inch single

A. "Ma quale idea" (Strange Idea Mix) – 5:31
B1. "Bambina che sará" – 3:20
B2. "Balla Bonus Beats" – 3:58

- German / Austrian / Swiss CD maxi-single
1. "Ma quale idea" (Single Version) – 4:26
2. "Bambina che sará" – 3:20
3. "Balla Bonus Beats" – 3:58
4. "Ma quale idea" (Strange Idea Mix) – 5:31

=== Credits and personnel ===
- Francesco Napoli – vocals
- Peter Columbus – producer
- Hans Lampe – engineering
- Oliver Kels – arranger

=== Charts ===
| Chart (1987–1988) | Peak position |
|---|---|
| Austria (Ö3 Austria Top 40) | 19 |
| West Germany (GfK) | 57 |

== Bnkr44 version ==
"Ma che idea"

Single by Bnkr44 and Pino D'Angiò
- Released: 1 March 2024
- Length: 3:46
- Label: Bomba Dischi; Universal
- Songwriters: Pino D'Angiò; Jacopo Adamo; Andrea Locci; Dario Lombardi; Pietro Serafini; Marco Vittiglio
- Producers: JxN; Erin

Bnkr44 singles chronology
| "Governo punk" (2024) | "Ma che idea" (2024) | "Nero mascara" (2024) |

In 2024, Italian pop punk band Bnkr44 performed the song together with Pino D'Angiò at the cover night of the 74th Sanremo Music Festival. The band released the song as a single on 1 March 2024, with the title "Ma che idea".

=== Credits and personnel ===
- Pino D'Angiò – author and vocals
- Jacopo Adamo – lyricist, composer and vocals
- Andrea Locci – lyricist, composer and vocals
- Dario Lombardi – lyricist, composer and vocals
- Pietro Serafini – lyricist, composer and vocals
- Marco Vittiglio – lyricist, composer and vocals
- JxN – producer
- Erin – producer

=== Charts ===
==== Weekly charts ====
| Chart (2024) | Peak position |
|---|---|
| Italy (FIMI) | 21 |
| Italy Airplay (EarOne) | 5 |

==== Year-end charts ====
| Chart (2024) | Position |
|---|---|
| Italy (FIMI) | 46 |
