= Andy Van Dorsselaer =

Andy Van
- Born: Andrew Alphonse Van Dorsselaer; 3 November 1968 (age 57); Frankston, Victoria, Australia
- Genres: Dance, electronic, house
- Occupations: Disc jockey, record producer
- Years active: 1980s–present
- Labels: Vicious Vinyl, Virgin Records, Capitol Records, Sony Music
- Member of: Vandalism
- Formerly of: Madison Avenue

Andrew Alphonse Van Dorsselaer (also known as Andy Van; born 3 November 1968) is an Australian disc jockey, record producer and co-founder of the record label Vicious Vinyl.

He was one half of the dance music act Madison Avenue with Cheyne Coates. Their 1999 song "Don't Call Me Baby" reached #2 on the ARIA Singles Chart in Australia and #1 on the RIANZ Singles Chart in New Zealand, the UK Singles Chart in the United Kingdom and the Billboard Dance Chart in the United States in 2000. In 2014, a remix of the track reached #1 on the ARIA Club Chart in Australia.

He is currently with the electronic act Vandalism (since 2004).

== Awards ==
- ARIA Music Awards of 1997: Best Dance Release for "Coma" by Pendulum. The award was presented to Pendulum and recognises "Coma". Van Dorsselaer produced the track but was not presented with an individual award.
- ARIA Music Awards of 2000: Single of the Year, Highest Selling Single and Breakthrough Artist – Single for "Don't Call Me Baby" by Madison Avenue, and Best Video for "Who the Hell Are You" by Mark Hartley. The awards were presented to Madison Avenue and recognise "Don't Call Me Baby", and to Mark Hartley for "Who the Hell Are You"'s music video. Van Dorsselaer was a member of Madison Avenue, he co-wrote and produced both tracks but he was not presented with an individual award.
