= For Y'ur Height Only =

1981 Philippine action comedy film by Eddie Nicart

- Directed by: Eddie Nicart
- Written by: Cora Caballes
- Produced by: Dick Randall; Peter M. Caballes
- Starring: Weng Weng
- Cinematography: Val Dauz
- Edited by: Edgardo Vinarao
- Music by: Pablo Vergara
- Distributed by: Liliw Productions; HQV Video (USA, VHS)
- Release date: September 2, 1981 (Philippines)
- Running time: 90 minutes
- Country: Philippines
- Language: Tagalog

For Y'ur Height Only (also known as For Your Height Only) is a 1981 Philippine action comedy spy film starring Weng Weng. Its title is a play on words on For Your Eyes Only, the title of the James Bond film released that same year. A sequel was produced in 1982, titled The Impossible Kid. Weng Weng is known as the shortest man to ever be a lead in a feature film, standing at 83 cm (2 ft 9 in).

In the film, a secret agent has to stop the world domination plans of a warlord.

== Plot ==
The diminutive Agent 00, the number 1 agent from the Secret Agency, is provided with a number of new hi-tech gadgets from his boss, and then sent to stop the mysterious warlord Mr. Giant, who has just kidnapped Dr. Kohler, a foreign scientist visiting Manila to offer his latest invention, the N-Bomb, to the government. Mr. Giant intends to use the lethal weapon to take over the world, but Agent 00 is ready to stop him.

He can count on the help of Irma, a fellow agent who has infiltrated Mr. Giant's criminal organization, working for the drug traffickers that are headed by a gangster named Cobra. This leads to many battles between Agent 00 and the villain's henchmen. Once Irma's cover is blown, she is taken prisoner as a bait and sent to Mr. Kaiser, Mr. Giant's second-in-command, who keeps her in his lair. In order to find Kaiser, Agent 00 enlists the help of other Bond girl types, such as night club enthusiast Anna and criminal reporter Marilyn, romancing his way to their allegiance. After flushing out and killing criminal bosses of increasing importance, and all of their henchmen, Agent 00 reaches Kaiser, but by then Irma has been shipped to Hidden Island, Mr. Giant's super-secret lair.

After finding the secret location of the island, Agent 00 uses a prototype size-compatible jet pack to get there, and calls for reinforcements. He confronts and kills Mr. Giant himself (who is revealed to be a dwarf himself, although taller than Agent 00), then along with the squad of agents from the Secret Agency, Agent 00 and Irma clean the island of all remaining henchmen. However, right after a freed Dr. Kohler has finally reached safety, Irma is shot and killed. In the final scene, Agent 00 is seen paying respect on her tomb.

== Cast ==
- Weng Weng – Agent 00
- Beth Sandoval – Irma
- Anna Marie Gutierrez – Anna
- Carmi Martin – Marilyn
- Yehlen Catral – Lola
- Rodolfo Garcia – Mr. Kaiser
- Mike Cohen – Professor Kohler

== Gadgets ==
Agent 00 has gadgets that are especially made for him and his size. Among these:

- Anti-Poison Ring – a ring that changes color when placed in proximity of poison.
- Remote-Control Hat – a hat used as a flying, bladed boomerang.
- Quick-Assembly, Small-Scale Machine Gun – a special machine gun, made to scale, to use in battle.
- Tiny Jetpack – used by 00 to get to Mr. Giant's island in the finale.

== Release and success ==
For Y'ur Height Only was released on September 2, 1981, in the Philippines.

That same year First Lady Imelda Marcos organized the first Manila International Film Festival. The objective of the festival was to promote Filipino films for them to be distributed worldwide. A lavish event took place, major entertainment figures were present including Priscilla Presley, Franco Nero, Brooke Shields, Jeremy Irons, etc. Local filmmakers saw it as a real opportunity to showcase their talents, however it was Weng Weng who became the mediatic center of attention, by making daily appearances demonstrating stunts, martial arts, and exercises. For Y'ur Height Only outsold every other film for international distribution.

Film distributor Tony Maharaj who bought the film for the West Indies said the film opened at number one on the same day as Steven Spielberg's Raiders of the Lost Ark and remained there for two weeks.

== Reception and legacy ==
Imee Marcos said its success at the festival shocked and shattered everyone's artistic aspirations. Filipino film historians Teddy Co and Ed Lejano said that in the film industry the Weng Weng image was uncomfortable since at the time they had no other international figures.

In the cinema of the Philippines, For Y'ur Height Only is the highest exported film. Weng Weng became the Philippines' first actor with an international status.

The original Tagalog language audio track is lost.

== See also ==
- List of incomplete or partially lost films
