= Pendulum (ambient band) =

- Origin: Melbourne, Victoria, Australia
- Genres: Ambient house
- Years active: 1994–1998
- Labels: Vicious Vinyl
- Past members: Julian Warner, Noel Mihailovic.

Pendulum was an ambient house Australian group, active from 1994 to 1998. They are best known for their 1997 single "Coma".

== Career ==
Pendulum formed in Melbourne, Australia, in 1994 as a partnership between two Melbourne disc jockeys: Julian Warner and Noel Mihailovic.

In early 1995, Pendulum released their debut single, "I Need You", which reached #1 on Melbourne's Kiss FM Dance chart within three weeks of its release, and it received major club play across the country. The song was released in USA on Fade records and in the UK on Foreign Policy.

"I Need You" was followed by the single "Awesome Party/Insecurity". Vicious Vinyl described the song as "A mish-mash of beats, loops, funky guitar, banging synths and some crazy samples". In July 1997, Pendulum released "Coma" which peaked at number 32 on the ARIA Charts and featured in the Triple J Hottest 100, 1997. At the ARIA Music Awards of 1997, "Coma" won ARIA Award for Best Dance Release. The group released an album titled 3 Knocks which failed to chart, despite receiving positive reviews from Mixmag, DJ and Rolling Stone. The group disbanded in 1998 to pursue other interests.

== Discography ==
=== Albums ===
Title	Album details
3 Knocks	Released: 1997; Label: Vicious Vinyl (VVLP005CD); Format: CD

=== Singles ===
List of singles, with selected chart positions
Year	Title	Peak chart positions	Album
Year	Title	AUS	Album
1995	"I Need You"	—	3 Knocks
1995	"Awesome Party/Insecurity"	—	3 Knocks
1997	"Coma"	46	3 Knocks

== Awards and nominations ==
=== ARIA Awards ===
Year	Award	Work	Result
1997	Best Dance Release	"Coma"	Won
