= Mark Hartley =

Australian filmmaker

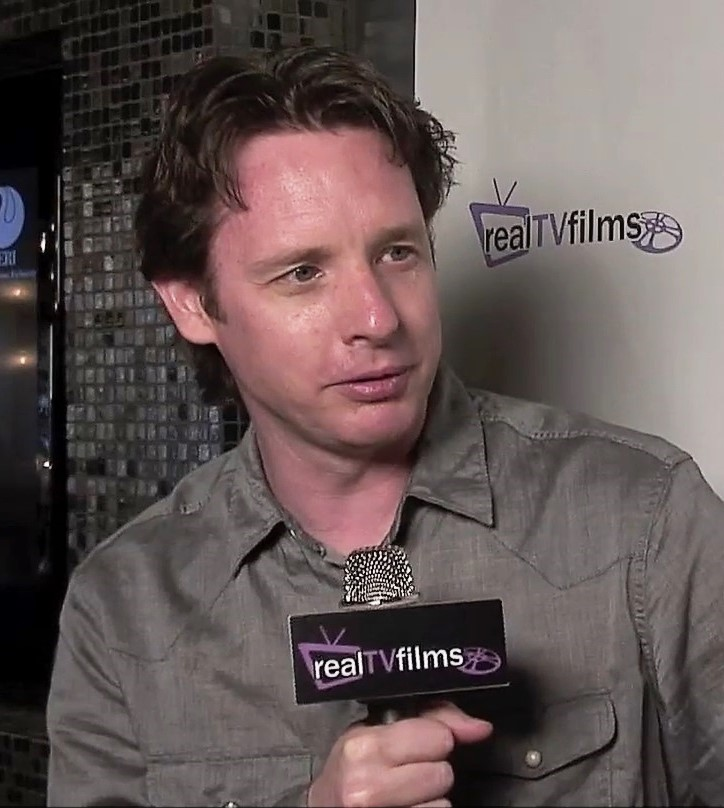
- Hartley interviewed in 2010
- Occupations: Film director and producer
- Years active: 1990–present
- Known for: Documentary film
- Notable work: Not Quite Hollywood: The Wild, Untold Story of Ozploitation!, Electric Boogaloo: The Wild, Untold Story of Cannon Films

Mark Hartley is an Australian film director, editor, and screenwriter. He is best known for his documentary films, including Not Quite Hollywood: The Wild, Untold Story of Ozploitation! (2008), and his 2013 remake of the 1978 film Patrick. He has also made many music videos, for which he has been nominated several times for ARIA Music Awards, winning one for "Who the Hell Are You" by Madison Avenue in 2000.

== Career ==
Mark Hartley got one of his first film credits, as music video director, on David Parker's 1993 cult film Hercules Returns. He is also a film editor and screenwriter. He has said that he "direct[s] as an editor", as his background is also in editing.

In 2008 he produced the documentary film Not Quite Hollywood: The Wild, Untold Story of Ozploitation!, followed by another documentary, Machete Maidens Unleashed! (2010), about the Filipino film industry, which was written and directed by Hartley.

In 2013, he made Patrick, a remake of the 1978 supernatural "Ozploitation" classic of Australian cinema, also named Patrick. The film was produced by Antony I. Ginnane.

He also wrote and directed the documentary film Electric Boogaloo: The Wild, Untold Story of Cannon Films, released in 2014. The film is about Israeli-born cousins Yoram Globus and Menahem Golan, who founded Cannon Films and changed the way films were made and marketed in Hollywood.

Hartley directed the thriller feature Girl at the Window, starring Radha Mitchell and Vince Colosimo, released in 2022. The film was written by Terence Hammond and Nicolette Minster, and produced by Antony I. Ginnane.

== Select filmography ==
- His Master's Voice (1992; short film) (comedy) As editor; directed by Yvonne Pecujac
- Mercy (1993; short film) As editor; directed by Mark Bakaitis
- A Dream Within a Dream: The Making of 'Picnic at Hanging Rock' (2004) (documentary)
- Not Quite Hollywood: The Wild, Untold Story of Ozploitation! (2008) (documentary)
- Machete Maidens Unleashed! (2010) (documentary)
- Patrick (2013)
- Electric Boogaloo: The Wild, Untold Story of Cannon Films (2014) (documentary)
- Girl at the Window (2022)

== Awards and nominations ==
=== ARIA Music Awards ===
The ARIA Music Awards is an annual awards ceremony that recognises excellence, innovation, and achievement across all genres of Australian music. They commenced in 1987.

Year	Nominee / work	Award	Result	Ref.
1997	Mark Hartley for "Good Mornin'" by You Am I	Best Video	Nominated	
1998	Mark Hartley for "Takin' All Day" by The Cruel Sea	Best Video	Nominated	
2000	Mark Hartley for "Who the Hell Are You" by Madison Avenue	Best Video	Won	
2000	Mark Hartley for "Don't Call Me Baby" by Madison Avenue	Best Video	Nominated	
2000	Mark Hartley for "Poison" by Bardot	Best Video	Nominated	
2001	Mark Hartley for "He Don't Love You" by Human Nature	Best Video	Nominated	
2001	Mark Hartley for "Chances Are" by Invertigo	Best Video	Nominated	
