= Don't Call Me Baby =

1999 single by Madison Avenue

Single by Madison Avenue

from the album The Polyester Embassy
- Released: 18 October 1999
- Genre: Dance
- Length: 3:46
- Label: Vicious Grooves; Virgin
- Songwriters: Cheyne Coates; Andy Van Dorsselaer; Duane Morrison; Giuseppe Chierchia
- Producer: Madison Avenue

Madison Avenue singles chronology
| "Don't Call Me Baby" (1999) | "Who the Hell Are You" (2000) |

Music video
- "Don't Call Me Baby" on YouTube

"Don't Call Me Baby" is a song by Australian house music duo Madison Avenue, released as the first single from their only studio album, The Polyester Embassy (2000). Written by Cheyne Coates, Andy Van Dorsselaer, Duane Morrison and Giuseppe Chierchia, the song includes a bassline sample from "Ma Quale Idea" by Italo disco artist Pino D'Angiò.

"Don't Call Me Baby" was released in Australia on 18 October 1999 and spent six non-consecutive weeks at number two on the ARIA Singles Chart, achieving triple-platinum status. It was also successful internationally, topping the charts in New Zealand and the United Kingdom in 2000. The song has been remixed both in 2014 and 2019 for its 15th and 20th anniversaries, respectively, including remixes by Tommie Sunshine, Mousse T., and Madison Avenue's writer-producer, Van Dorsselaer.

== Commercial performance ==
"Don't Call Me Baby" debuted at number three on the Australian ARIA Singles Chart on 31 October 1999. Three weeks later, the track reached its peak of number two, where it stayed for six non-consecutive weeks. The recording was certified triple platinum by the Australian Recording Industry Association (ARIA), denoting 210,000 shipments of the single. In New Zealand, the song entered the RIANZ Singles Chart at number 39. Two weeks later, the single jumped from number 34 to number two. On its seventh week, "Don't Call Me Baby" peaked at number one on 2 April 2000, where it stayed for one week. The song was awarded a gold certification by the Recording Industry Association of New Zealand (RIANZ) for shipments of 7,500 copies.

In the United Kingdom, "Don't Call Me Baby" originally peaked at number 30 on the UK Singles Chart in late 1999 but re-entered the chart several times during early 2000, prompting a re-release in May. The re-issued single entered at the top of the chart with a sale of 93,794 copies. As of May 2020, the song has sold and streaming 600,000 units in the United Kingdom, receiving a platinum certification from the British Phonographic Industry (BPI) in 2023. In the rest of Europe, the song became a top-10 hit in Greece, Ireland, Norway, and Portugal.

== Impact and legacy ==
In 2011, MTV Dance ranked "Don't Call Me Baby" at number 41 on their list of the "100 Biggest 90's Dance Anthems of All Time". In 2017, BuzzFeed listed the song at number 34 on their "101 Greatest Dance Songs of the '90s" list.

== Track listings ==
=== 1999 releases ===
- Australian maxi-CD single
1. "Don't Call Me Baby" (original mix edit) – 3:49
2. "Don't Call Me Baby" (The Dronez Old School mix) – 6:40
3. "Don't Call Me Baby" (Alexander Purkart meets the Plastic Park remix) – 7:34
4. "Don't Call Me Baby" (original 12-inch mix) – 7:50
5. "Don't Call Me Baby" (The Dronez dub) – 6:10
6. "Don't Call Me Baby" (original dub) – 7:37
- UK CD single
1. "Don't Call Me Baby" (original mix edit) – 3:48
2. "Don't Call Me Baby" (The Dronez Old School vocal mix) – 6:35
3. "Don't Call Me Baby" (original 12-inch mix) – 7:48
- UK 12-inch single

A1. "Don't Call Me Baby" (original 12-inch mix) – 7:48
B1. "Don't Call Me Baby" (The Dronez Old School vocal mix) – 6:35
B2. "Don't Call Me Baby" (The Dronez dub) – 6:12

- UK cassette single
1. "Don't Call Me Baby" (original mix edit) – 3:48
2. "Don't Call Me Baby" (The Dronez Old School vocal mix) – 6:35
3. "Don't Call Me Baby" (original dub mix) – 7:39
- European CD single
1. "Don't Call Me Baby" (original mix 7-inch)
2. "Don't Call Me Baby" (12-inch mix)
- European maxi-CD single
1. "Don't Call Me Baby" (original mix 7-inch)
2. "Don't Call Me Baby" (12-inch mix)
3. "Don't Call Me Baby" (dub)
4. "Don't Call Me Baby" (Alexander Purkart meets the Plastic Park remix)

=== 2000 releases ===
- UK CD and cassette single
1. "Don't Call Me Baby" (original mix edit) – 3:47
2. "Don't Call Me Baby" (Armin van Buuren's Stalker mix) – 6:59
3. "Don't Call Me Baby" (Madison Babe from Outta Space remix) – 7:00
- UK 12-inch single

A1. "Don't Call Me Baby" (Armin van Buuren's Stalker dub) – 6:13
A2. "Don't Call Me Baby" (original 12-inch mix) – 6:27
B1. "Don't Call Me Baby" (Madison Babe from Outta Space remix) – 7:00

- US maxi-CD single
1. "Don't Call Me Baby" (original mix 7-inch) – 3:47
2. "Don't Call Me Baby" (12-inch mix) – 7:48
3. "Don't Call Me Baby" (dub) – 7:39
4. "Don't Call Me Baby" (Alexander Purkart meets the Plastic Park remix) – 7:24
5. "Don't Call Me Baby" (The Dronez Old School vocal mix) – 6:35
- US 12-inch single

A1. "Don't Call Me Baby" (12-inch mix) – 7:48
A2. "Don't Call Me Baby" (dub) – 7:39
B1. "Don't Call Me Baby" (Alexander Purkart meets the Plastic Park remix) – 7:24
B2. "Don't Call Me Baby" (The Dronez Old School vocal mix) – 6:35

== Credits and personnel ==
Credits are taken from the Australian maxi-CD single liner notes.

Studios

- Engineered at Backbeach Recording Studios (Melbourne, Australia)
- Mastered at Crystal Mastering (Melbourne, Australia)

Personnel

- Madison Avenue – production
  - Cheyne Coates – writing
  - Andy Van Dorsselaer – writing
- Duane Morrison – writing
- Giuseppe Chierchia – writing
- Mark Rachelle – engineering
- John Ruberto – mastering
- Rubber Tree Multimedia – graphic design
- Cube – graphic design
- James Papino – photography and image

== Charts ==
=== Weekly charts ===
Weekly chart performance
| Chart (1999–2000) | Peak position |
|---|---|
| Australia (ARIA) | 2 |
| Belgium (Ultratop 50 Flanders) | 16 |
| Belgium (Ultratop 50 Wallonia) | 23 |
| Belgium Dance (Ultratop Flanders) | 24 |
| Canada Dance/Urban (RPM) | 1 |
| Denmark (IFPI) | 13 |
| Europe (Eurochart Hot 100) | 9 |
| France (SNEP) | 41 |
| Greece (IFPI) | 7 |
| Iceland (Íslenski Listinn Topp 40) | 31 |
| Ireland (IRMA) | 4 |
| Ireland Dance (IRMA) | 1 |
| Italy (Musica e dischi) | 35 |
| Netherlands (Dutch Top 40) | 17 |
| Netherlands (Single Top 100) | 22 |
| New Zealand (Recorded Music NZ) | 1 |
| Norway (VG-lista) | 11 |
| Portugal (AFP) | 7 |
| Scottish Singles Sales (Official Charts) | 1 |
| Spain (Promusicae) | 20 |
| Sweden (Sverigetopplistan) | 47 |
| Switzerland (Schweizer Hitparade) | 38 |
| UK Singles (Official Charts) | 1 |
| UK Dance (Official Charts) | 2 |
| US Billboard Hot 100 | 88 |
| US Dance Club Songs (Billboard) | 1 |
| US Dance Singles Sales (Billboard) | 4 |
| US Rhythmic Airplay (Billboard) | 20 |

=== Year-end charts ===
Annual chart rankings
| Chart (1999) | Position |
|---|---|
| Australia (ARIA) | 7 |
| UK Club Chart (Music Week) | 28 |

| Chart (2000) | Position |
|---|---|
| Australia (ARIA) | 83 |
| Ireland (IRMA) | 53 |
| New Zealand (RIANZ) | 16 |
| UK Singles (OCC) | 31 |
| US Dance Club Play (Billboard) | 6 |
| US Maxi-Singles Sales (Billboard) | 11 |
| US Rhythmic Top 40 (Billboard) | 83 |

== Certifications ==
Certifications and sales
| Region | Certification | Certified units/sales |
|---|---|---|
| Australia (ARIA) | 3× Platinum | 210,000^{^} |
| New Zealand (RMNZ) | Gold | 5,000^{*} |
| United Kingdom (BPI) | Platinum | 600,000^{‡} |
^{*} Sales figures based on certification alone.^{^} Shipments figures based on certification alone.^{‡} Sales+streaming figures based on certification alone.

== Release history ==
| Region | Date | Format(s) | Label(s) | Ref(s). |
|---|---|---|---|---|
| Australia | 18 October 1999 | CD | Vicious Grooves; Virgin | |
| Belgium | 25 October 1999 | CD; maxi CD | Sony Music | |
| United Kingdom (original) | 1 November 1999 | 12-inch vinyl; CD; cassette | Vicious Grooves; VC | |
| United Kingdom (re-release) | 8 May 2000 | 12-inch vinyl; CD; cassette | Vicious Grooves; VC | |
| United States | 23 May 2000 | CD | C2 | |
| United States | 13 June 2000 | Rhythmic contemporary; contemporary hit radio | C2 | |
