= Pino D'Angiò =

Italian singer-songwriter (1952–2024)

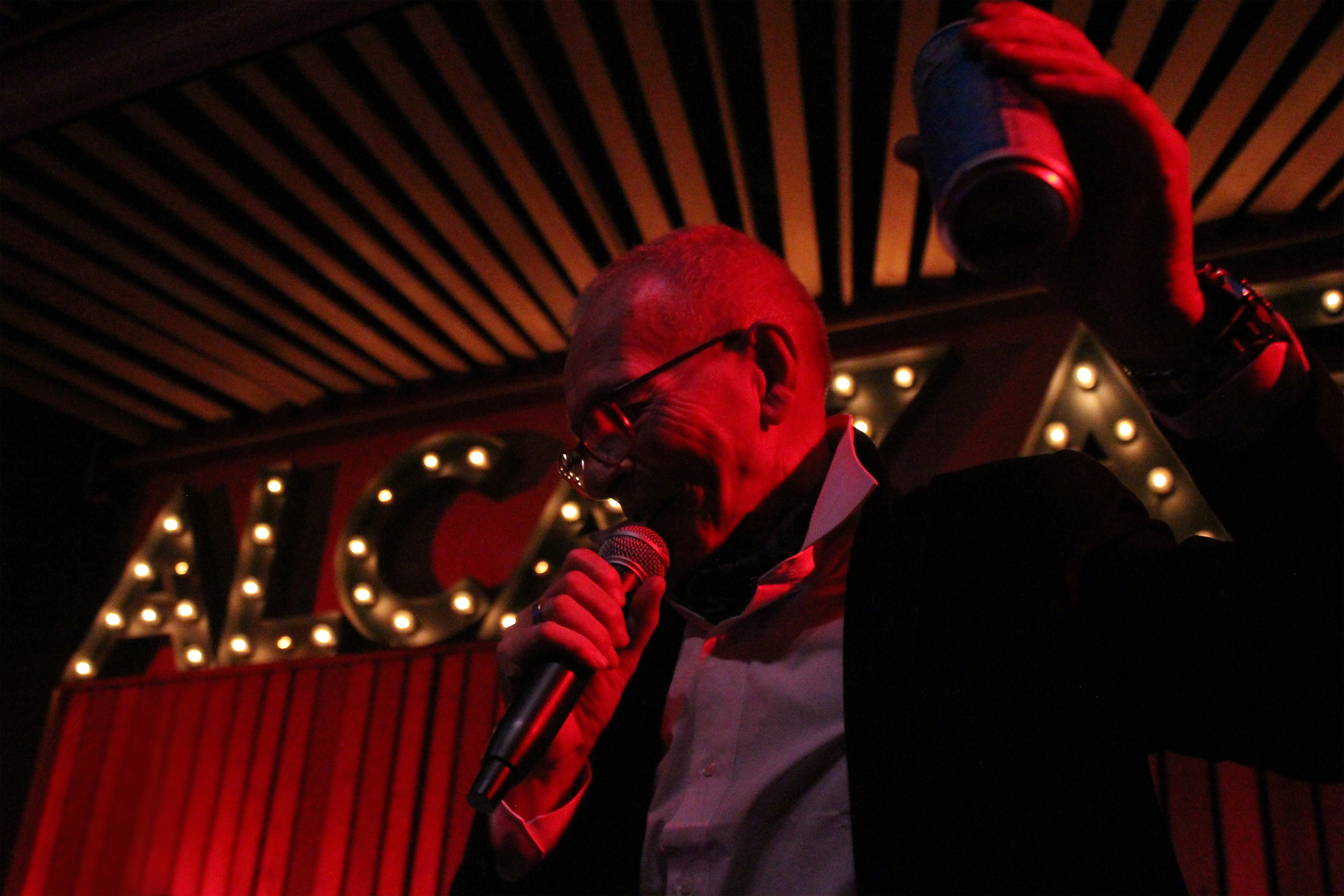
- D'Angiò performing in 2023

Background information
- Born: Giuseppe Chierchia; 14 August 1952; Pompei, Campania, Italy
- Died: 6 July 2024 (aged 71) Formello, Lazio, Italy
- Genres: Pop; Italo disco
- Years active: 1979–2024
- Labels: Ri-Fi; OUT; SGM Records; Carosello; Diki Records; Pull; D.V. More Record; Zetazero; Noise & Dreams
- Website: pinodangio.com

Giuseppe Chierchia (IPA: [dʒuˈzɛppe ˈkjɛrkja]; 14 August 1952 – 6 July 2024), known professionally as Pino D'Angiò (IPA: [ˈpiːno danˈdʒɔ]), was an Italian singer-songwriter. He was best known for his 1980 hit Italo disco song, "Ma quale idea".

== Life and career ==
Born in Pompei on 14 August 1952 into a family originating from Mercato San Severino, he was the son of engineer Francesco Chierchia, and teacher Franca Romana. D'Angiò spent his childhood between the United States and Canada, following his father, before returning to Italy in 1963. After completing his military service, he enrolled in the Faculty of Medicine at University of Siena. As a music lover, and in need of extra money, he started singing in local bars, where he met record producer Ezio Leoni, with whom, inspired by Fred Buscaglione's artistic personality and style, he made his recording debut in 1979, with the single "È libero, scusi?". In 1980, he obtained international success with his signature song "Ma quale idea", which sold over two million copies in Italy, and 12 million copies worldwide.

He released several more singles and albums in the same style, notably "Un concerto da strapazzo", "Fammi un panino", and "Genoveffa". By 1990, his recordings had sold over four million copies.

Under the name Age of Love, he and producer Bruno Sanchioni released an eponymous track in 1990, which featured vocals by French dancer Valérie Honoré. The vocal is often misattributed to Dutch supermodel Karen Mulder. Starting from the late 1980s, he also worked as a television and radio presenter and writer.

D'Angiò also composed songs for other artists, notably "Ma chi è quello lì" for Mina. In 2024, he took part in the Sanremo Music Festival 2024 where he presented a new version of "Ma quale idea" together with the band Bnkr44; the ensuing single was a hit, being certified platinum.

In his later years D'Angiò faced multiple health issues, including throat cancer, lung cancer, and a stroke. He died suddenly on 6 July 2024, at his home in Formello, at the age of 71, following a serious illness he had suffered in the preceding weeks. His family announced the news on his social media profiles. His funeral was held three days later in Pompeii, at the Church of SS. Salvatore, and he was buried in the local cemetery. The following day, the artist was scheduled to appear on TV, along with Bnkr44, in an episode of TIM Summer Hits, recorded on 12 June of that year in Rome and broadcast on RAI 1; however, his performance was not aired as a sign of mourning and was postponed to 19 July.

== Discography ==
=== Albums ===
- 1981 – ...Balla! (Ri-Fi) (LP)
- 1982 – Ti regalo della musica (Ri-Fi) (LP)
- 1983 – Una notte maledetta (SGM) (LP)
- 1986 – Sunshine Blue (SGM Records) (LP)
- 1988 – Gente sì & gente no (Carosello) (LP)
- 1989 – Dancing in Jazz (Carosello) (LP)
- 1991 – STS - Siamo tutti stufi (Carosello, CLN 25151) (LP)
- 1997 – Notte d'amore (Pull, 484059-2) (as "Pino D'Angiò & Powerfunk") (CD)
- 1999 – I successi (D.V. More Record, CD DV 6340) (CD)
- 1999 – Ma quale idea? e le altre storie (Carosello) (CD)
- 2002 – Lettere a Federico Fellini (Zetazero) (CD)
- 2010 – The Only One (Noise & Dreams) (CD)
- 2011 – The Italian Jazz Band & Fred Buscaglione Theory
- 2016 – Dagli Italiani a Beethoven
- 2019 – King of Funk - Pino D'Angio
- 2020 – Jazz donne fragole & Ombrelli
- 2023 – The New Album (feat. Bobby Soul)
- 2024 – Funky Maestro (Posthumous)

=== Singles ===
- 1979 – È libero, scusi?/La bottega di Mefistole (Ri-Fi) (7")
- 1980 – Ma quale idea/Lezione d'amore (Ri-Fi) (7")
- 1981 – Un concerto da strapazzo (Scusate sono impazzito)/Me ne frego di te (Disco Charleston) (Ri-Fi) (7")
- 1981 – Okay okay/Una notte da impazzire + Mannaggia rock and roll (OUT) (12" promo)
- 1982 – Fammi un panino/Questo amore è un motore
- 1983 – Evelonpappà evelonmammà/Mani in alto (SGM Records) (7")
- 1983 – Una notte maledetta/I tabaccai (SGM Records) (7")
- 1987 – Più sexy/Alquanto arrabbiati (Carosello) (as "Pino D'Angiò & tutti gli altri...") (7", 12")
- 1989 – Bella margherita/Gente intelligente (Carosello) (7")
- 1990 – The Age of Love (Diki Records) G. Chierchia/B. Sanchioni - Vocals: Valérie Honoré
- 1991 – Gli sgarbi si pagano/L'inverno (Carosello) (7")
- 2010 – Montecarlo
- 2010 – Without Without You
- 2011 – Che strano amore questo amore
- 2013 – A South American Girl
- 2019 – La Lampada
- 2020 – Patatonza
- 2020 – Marilyn Is Waiting For Me
- 2020 – FAI TUTTO TU
- 2020 – CASINO CASINO
- 2020 – SOLO
- 2020 – SMETTILA
- 2020 – Slow
- 2020 – Poker
- 2020 – Non lo so chi era
- 2020 – L'HO CONOSCIUTA
- 2020 – IL DOMATORE
- 2020 – CANZONE LENTA
- 2020 – CHI E' STATO
- 2022 – Non dormo mai (feat. Bobby Soul)
- 2022 – Funky Jump (feat. Bobby Soul & Momo Riva)
- 2023 – Sali sul treno
- 2024 – MA CHE IDEA (with Bnkr44)
- 2024 – Paperina Qua Qua
