= The Impossible Kid (film) =

- Directed by: Eddie Nicart
- Screenplay by: Greg B. Macabenta
- Story by: Cora C. Ridon
- Produced by: Twinkle
- Starring: Weng Weng; Romy Diaz
- Cinematography: Bhaul Dauz
- Edited by: Edgardo Vinarao
- Music by: Pablo Vergara (musical director)
- Production company: Liliw Films International
- Release date: 1982
- Running time: 92 minutes
- Country: Philippines
- Language: Filipino

The Impossible Kid is a 1982 exploitation film directed by Eddie Nicart, and starring Filipino actor Weng Weng. The film is a sequel to For Your Height Only (1981), which was also directed by Nicart. The original Tagalog language audio track is lost.

== Plot ==
Agent 00 works for the Manila branch of Interpol. He receives a radio dispatch instructing him to intercept a truck that is known to be carrying a kidnapped businessman. He rescues the man, and learns from his chief at Interpol that an extortion ring has been kidnapping business magnates, and murdering them if they fail to pay the ransom.

The extortionists send a video to the Philippine Consul of Industrialists. In the video, a masked man claims that he represents a nationalist organization with international connections. He demands that within one week the PCI members must collectively pay 1 billion pesos, or else every member will be kidnapped and killed, and their businesses bombed. The money he demands is, he says, to fund their organization so that they can act on behalf of "the people".

The chief tells Agent 00 to identify the mastermind of the extortion ring. Soon after, PCI member Don Simeon attempts to pay his own ransom, but 00 hides the money and attacks the men who come to collect it. Simeon complains that Interpol's interference has endangered his life.

The masked man sends an assassin after Agent 00. 00 captures the assassin, but she is killed before she can disclose any information.

00 sneaks into the home of Manolo Cervantes, head of the PCI, and accuses him of masterminding the extortion plot. Cervantes tells Interpol that he will bring charges against Agent 00 unless they remove him from the investigation. They comply, but a general at Interpol allows 00 to continue in an unofficial capacity. The chief reports to his own superiors that 00 suspects Cervantes.

Meanwhile, despite objections from Interpol, the PCI intends to pay the ransom. The night before the money is due, Cervantes, his partner Simeon, and their three co-conspirators celebrate on a yacht—where they also have Agent 00 caged. They attempt to drown 00, but a woman working aboard the yacht rescues him.

The next morning, Interpol officers and some PCI members (including Cervantes and Simeon) wait on a beach with a case containing the ransom money. Cervantes floats the case in the ocean, and his agents soon collect it. However, when they return to the boat, Agent 00 charges them and starts shooting. After the gun battle, a fire starts in the cabin, and the boat explodes. Interpol agents find the case and bring it back to shore. When Cervantes and Simeon open it, Agent 00 is inside. He beats the two men and Interpol agents lead them away. The woman who rescued 00 from drowning waits for him nearby. He runs to her and they kiss.

== Derivative works ==
Brazilian comedy group Hermes & Renato lampooned The Impossible Kid in the first-season finale of their comedy series Tela Class (2007). Each episode of the series is a burlesque re-edit and re-dub of a film. This episode, "Um Capeta em Forma de Guri" ("A Demon in a Boy's Body"), re-imagines Agent 00 as a wicked and mischievous little boy.

The Impossible Kid was also featured in the second season of This Movie Sucks! (2010), a Canadian comedy program in which host Ed the Sock and a guest watch and mock a preselected film. Liana K was the guest for the episode.

== See also ==
- List of incomplete or partially lost films
