= Vicious Recordings =

Australian independent electronic music label

- Vicious Vinyl logo
- Parent company: Vicious Label Group
- Founded: 1992; 34 years ago
- Founder: Andy Van, John Course, Colin Daniels
- Status: Active
- Genre: House, electronic dance music, techno
- Country of origin: Australia
- Location: Melbourne
- Official website: www.vicious.com.au

Vicious Recordings is an Australian independent record label based in Melbourne. Founded in 1992 as Vicious Vinyl, it is recognized as one of the most influential dance music labels in Australia, credited with launching the global careers of artists such as Madison Avenue, Dirty South, and Avicii.

== History ==
=== 1991–1992: Formation and Vicious Vinyl ===
The label was conceived in 1991 by Melbourne DJs Andy Van and John Course, with Colin Daniels joining shortly after. Originally named Vicious Vinyl, the label was established to provide a platform for Australian electronic music producers who were struggling to find local outlets for their work. The label's debut release in January 1992 was "God Intended" by Ground Level.

=== 1990s–2000s: Rebranding and crossover success ===
As the label expanded beyond the domestic club scene, it rebranded to Vicious Recordings to reflect its transition from a boutique vinyl-only outlet to a multi-format global record label. During the late 1990s, the label achieved international mainstream success via its commercial imprint, Vicious Grooves. The label's most notable success was Madison Avenue's "Don't Call Me Baby" (1999), which reached number one on the UK Singles Chart and the ARIA Charts.

=== 2008–present: Global influence and Avicii ===
In 2008, the label signed Swedish producer Tim Berg (later known as Avicii), releasing several of his formative tracks including "My Feelings for You" (with Sebastien Drums) and "Streetdancer." In 2022, the label celebrated its 30th anniversary with a comprehensive remix project featuring reimagined versions of its catalog by artists such as Mark Knight and Don Diablo.

== Sub-labels ==
The label operates as the Vicious Label Group, encompassing several specialized imprints:

- Vicious Recordings: Flagship label for commercial house and dance music.
- Vicious Grooves: Imprint for commercial crossover hits.
- Be Rich Records: Formerly Vicious Bitch, focusing on indie-dance and bass music.
- Vicious Black: Underground house and techno.
- Extrovert Music: Pop-dance and crossover electronic music.

== Notable artists ==
Artists who have released music through the Vicious Label Group include:

- Avicii
- Madison Avenue
- Dirty South
- Peking Duk
- Rogue Traders
- Sgt Slick
- The Potbelleez
- Zoe Badwi

== Awards and recognition ==
Vicious Recordings and its associated imprints have received multiple ARIA Music Awards for their releases:

- 1997: Best Dance Release (Won for Pendulum, "Coma").
- 1998: Best Dance Release (Won for Sgt Slick, "White Treble, Black Bass").
- 2000: Single of the Year (Won for Madison Avenue, "Don't Call Me Baby").
- 2000: Best Breakthrough Artist – Single (Won for Madison Avenue, "Don't Call Me Baby").

The label has also received numerous nominations at the WMC International Dance Music Awards for Best Global Record Label, reflecting its international influence beyond the Australian market.

== See also ==
- List of record labels
