= Sessions (compilation series) =

Remix album / DJ mix album series by various artists
- Released: 1993–present
- Genre: Dance; House; Big beat Electronica; Drum and bass Techno; Hard house Trance; Chill-out
- Label: Ministry of Sound
- Compiler: Various

Sessions is a series of DJ mix albums, each album normally by a different DJ who also compiles the tracks, released by the London-based electronic dance music label Ministry of Sound. Alongside The Annual, it is one of Ministry of Sound's better-known compilation album series.

== History ==
The Ministry of Sound record label began in 1993, and the first release on it was The Sessions Volume One, a 12-track mix compiled and mixed by Tony Humphries. It was critically acclaimed and more Sessions were released to critical acclaim and even charted higher in the UK Compilation Chart. Sessions 5, by Masters at Work, was the first double album in the series and every volume since has either been a double or triple album. In 1995, 1997, 1999 (and two later editions in 2003, and one in 2011) is the Late Night Sessions series. The first edition from 1995 was mixed by DJ Harvey. In about 2000, the Sessions series was a joint release between Ministry of Sound and Defected Records. This lasted for volumes 10-15. Volume 12 was the last of the original series of Sessions. It had become more of an Defected release than a Ministry of Sound release evidenced by the fact the Ministry of Sound's logo wasn't even present on the twelfth Sessions cover. Volumes 13, 14 and 15 actually didn't feature a number in the title.

After focusing on the spin-off series Chillout Sessions, which ran initially for 8 volumes between 2001 and 2003 (plus a 9th volume in 2006), Ministry of Sound "rebooted" the Sessions series with a brand new album released in 2005. This was the entirely live recording from Tim Sheridan and Smokin' Jo. This rebooted Sessions lasted for fifteen volumes until 2007. The last five albums of the 15 in this reboot had the issue number as a suffix to the title. 2007 also saw the release of Sessions Summer 2007. Another Summer edition was released in 2009. Various other Sessions were released such as Funky House Sessions.

=== Spin-offs ===
The Chillout Sessions series is perhaps the best-known "spin-off" to the series, beginning in early 2001 when Ministry of Sound started get digital mixers to mix their albums as opposed to big-name DJs like Tall Paul, Pete Tong or Paul Oakenfold.

== Series overview ==
Note: These refer to the albums released in the UK under the Ministry of Sound label, and not any of the alternate releases from other countries or labels (unless it's Defected Records)

All releases that are a jointed release between MOS and Defected are mentioned in the notes sections.

=== Main series (UK) ===
Year	Title	DJ/compiler	UK Comp. Chart position	Notes
1993	The Sessions Volume One	Tony Humphries	16	The first ever DJ mix album. Also the first album released on Ministry of Sound's label.
1994	The Sessions Volume Two	Paul Oakenfold	6	First Released Paul Oakenfold DJ mix.
1994	The Sessions Volume 3	Clivilles & Cole	8	Also released across Europe
1995	Sessions 4	C.J. Mackintosh	9	Last single-disc album in the series.
1995	Late Night Sessions	DJ Harvey	–	Not the same album as the Late Night Sessions released in 2003 or 2011
1995	The Sessions Volume 5	Masters at Work	15	First double album in the series
1996	Sessions Six	Frankie Knuckles	8	Disc 1 is Song Disc, Disc 2 is Track Disc.
1997	Sessions Seven	David Morales	4	Allmusic rating:
1997	Late Night Sessions II	X-Press 2	–	
1997	Sessions Eight	Todd Terry	11	Allmusic rating:
1998	Sessions Nine	Erick Morillo	17	
1999	Late Night Sessions III	Farley & Heller	49	
2000	Sessions Ten: Subliminal Sessions	Erick Morillo, Harry "Choo Choo" Romero, José Nunez	18	First album in the series mixed by multiple DJs.
2001	Sessions Eleven: The R-Senal Sessions	Roger Sanchez	–	First release on the Defected label.
2001	The Chillout Sessions	?	1	First of the Chillout Sessions
2001	Sessions Twelve: The Magic Sessions	Little Louie Vega, Tony Humphries and Tedd Patterson	36	Only some copies featured the Ministry of Sound logo. Released with Defected Records.
2001	The Chillout Session 2	?	2	
2001	Ibiza Chillout Session	?	12	
2001	Kings of Tomorrow Sessions	Sandy Rivera	43	Released with Defected Records.
2002	Defected Sessions	Full Intention and Smokin' Jo	–	Released with Defected Records.
2002	The Chillout Session Ibiza 2002	Alex Macnutt	4	Allmusic rating:
2002	Soulfuric Sessions	Jazz 'N' groove	–	Final release with Defected Records.
2002	The Chillout Session 2003 - Winter Collection	Dave 'Deadly Turner'	20	
2003	Late Night Sessions	?	9	Not the same album as the Late Night Sessions released in 2003 or 2011.; Allmusic rating:
2003	The Chillout Session Summer Collection 2003	Alex Macnutt (compiler); Steve Canuento, Dipesh Parmer (mix producers)	10	
2003	The Chillout Session Ibiza Sunsets	?	11	Disc one is As the Sun Sets, Disc two is After Sunset.; Allmusic rating:
2003	Late Night Sessions Autumn Collection	?	28	
2003	The Very Best of Chillout Session	?	48	"Best of" for the Chillout Sessions.
2004	Saturday Sessions	John Carter & Mark Hughes	?	Artwork is similar to the Australian Sessions series.
2005	Funky House Sessions	Dipesh Parmar	5	
2005	Sessions ^{$}	Smokin Jo and Tim Sheridan	–	First release in the June 2005 – present revival
2005	Sessions ^{$}	Derrick Carter	–	
2006	The Chillout Session	Unknown	15	Not the same album as that of the 2001 release.; Liner notes list producer, mixer and compiler ("This album was brought to you by ..."); Individual roles not specified.
2006	Sessions ^{$}	Steve Angello	–	
2006	Funky House Sessions 06	?	2	
2006	Sessions ^{$}	DJ Sneak	–	
2006	Sessions ^{$}	Josh Wink	–	
2006	Sessions ^{$}	Mark Farina	–	
2006	Sessions ^{$}	Seamus Haji	–	
2006	Sessions ^{$}	Axwell	–	Disc one is The Club, disc two is The Villa.
2006	Sessions ^{$}	Cajmere vs Green Velvet	–	
2006	Sessions ^{$}	Andy Cato	–	Final "$" album
2007	Sessions 11	Fedde le Grand	–	The numbering system returned on this album at volume #11; The volumes 1-10 in this system were the Sessions ^{$} albums.
2007	Electro House Sessions	Unknown	3	Subtitled The Sound of Electro House.
2007	Sessions 12	Mark Knight	–	
2007	Funky House Sessions 07	?	2	
2007	Sessions 13	D. Ramirez	–	
2007	Sessions 14	Sebastian Ingrosso	–	Contains a hidden track.
2007	Sessions Summer 2007	Seamus Haji, Dave Spoon, Chris Coco	?	
2007	Sessions 15	N.Y.N.C. Project	–	
2007	Sessions 16	Harry "Choo Choo" Romero	–	The final album of the 16-part Sessions series of 2005–2007.
2008	Sessions 8.1	Meat Katie		
2009	Summer Sessions	?	4	Disc 1 is Summer Dance, Disc 2 is Summer Funk, Disc 3 is Summer Chill.
2009	The Chilled House Session	?	13	
2011	Chilled House Session 2	?	40	
2011	Late Night Sessions	?	?	Not the same album as the 1995 or 2003 albums.
2012	Chilled House Session 3	?	?	
2012	Saturday Sessions	TBC	TBC	Released 14 May 2012.

=== Australian albums ===
Year	Title	DJ/compiler	ARIA Position (Dance album chart)
2001	The Chillout Session (Same as UK release)		-
2001	The Chillout Session 2		1
2002	The Chillout Sessions 3		1
2003	Chillout Sessions 4		1
2003	Late Night Sessions	Mark Dynamix	7
2003	House Sessions	Grant Smillie & Tim McGee	8
2004	The Chillout Session: Summer Collection 2004		1
2004	Chillout Sessions 5		1
2004	Sessions One	John Course & Mark Dynamix	1
2004	Chillout Sessions 6		1
2005	Chillout Sessions 7		1
2005	Sessions Two	John Course & Mark Dynamix	1
2005	Kid Kenobi Sessions	Kid Kenobi	6
2005	Chillout Sessions 8		1
2006	Sessions Three	John Course & Goodwill	1
2006	Chillout Sessions 9		3
2007	Sessions Four	John Course & Dirty South	1
2007	Kid Kenobi Sessions 2007	Kid Kenobi	4
2007	Electro House Sessions	Tommy Trash & The Stafford Brothers	1
2007	Chillout Sessions 10		2
2008	Electro House Sessions 2	Tommy Trash & The Stafford Brothers	1
2008	Sessions Five	The Potbelleez & Goodwill	1
2008	Chillout Sessions XI		1
2009	Ministry of Sound Sessions Six	Goodwill, Tommy Trash & Dirty South	1
2009	Chillout Sessions XII		3
2010	Electro House Sessions 3	Klaas & The Only	3
2010	Sessions Seven	Stafford Brothers, Tommy Trash & Steve Aoki	1
2010	Chillout Sessions XIII		2
2011	Electro House Sessions 4	Timmy Trumpet & Rob Pix	2
2011	Sessions Eight	Sam La More & Tommy Trash	1
2011	Chillout Sessions XIV		4
2012	SessioNZ (New Zealand exclusive released by Ministry of Sound Australia)	General Lee & Daniel Farley	-
2012	Electro House Sessions Vol. 5	The Only & Rob Pix	3
2012	Sessions Nine	Timmy Trumpet & Tom Piper	1
2012	Chillout Sessions XV		-
2013	Sessions 10	Timmy Trumpet & Scndl	-

== See also ==
- Ministry of Sound
- Chillout Sessions
- The Annual
- DJ mix
- Defected Records
