= Sessions Eight =

Ministry of Sound Sessions Eight

Compilation album by Various artists. Mixed by Sam La More & Tommy Trash
- Released: 13 May 2011
- Genre: Electro house, dance
- Label: Ministry of Sound

Series chronology
Sessions Seven (2010)	Ministry of Sound Sessions Eight (2011)	Sessions Nine (2012)

Ministry of Sound Sessions Eight is a dance music compilation album and the eighth installment of the Ministry of Sound Australia "sessions" series, which started in 2004. The discs were mixed by Sam La More and Tommy Trash. This was the first appearance for Sam La More but the third appearance for Tommy Trash, who appeared in Ministry of Sound Sessions Six and Sessions Seven. Disc one was mixed by La More and disc two by Trash. Sessions Eight finished 2011 at number five on the ARIA 2011 End-of-Year Top 50 Dance Albums Chart and number ten on the ARIA Top 50 Compilations Chart.

== Track listing ==
=== Disc 1 Mixed by Sam La More ===
1. Tonite Only - We Run The Nite (Original mix)
2. TV ROCK & Hook N Sling feat. Rudy - Diamonds In The Sky (Original mix)
3. Dune vs Alesso - Heiress Of Valentina (Alesso Exclusive Mix)
4. Alex Gaudino feat. Kelly Rowland - What A Feeling (Original mix)
5. Ian Carey feat. Snoop Dogg & Bobby Anthony - Last Night (Sneaker Fox Remix)
6. MYNC Project Feat. Abigail Bailey - Something On Your Mind (Denzal Park Remix)
7. Axwell - Heart Is King (Original mix)
8. Sander van Doorn feat. Carol Lee - Love Is Darkness (Original mix)
9. Afrojack - Doing It Right (Original mix)
10. Green Velvet - Flash (Nicky Romero Remix)
11. Kurd Maverick - Warum Nisht! (Original mix)
12. Ou Est Le Swimming Pool - These New Knights (Luke Chable Remix)
13. The Potbelleez - From The Music (Original mix)
14. Luciana - I'm Still Hot (Original mix)
15. David Guetta feat. Rihanna - Who's That Chick? (Original mix)
16. Avicii - Sweet Dreams (Original mix)
17. Diddy Dirty Money feat. Skylar Grey - Coming Home (Dirty South Remix)
18. PNAU - The Truth (Sam La More Remix)
19. Miami Horror - Holiday (Adrian Lux Remix)
20. Dr Don Don - King of the Stars (Pablo Calamari Remix)

=== Disc 2 Mixed by Tommy Trash ===
1. Martin Solveig feat. Kele - Ready 2 Go (Original mix)
2. Moonbootica - Tonite (Original mix)
3. The Aston Shuffle feat. Lovers Electric - Start Again (Original mix)
4. Don Diablo & Dragonette - Animale (Original mix)
5. DEV feat. The Cataracs - Bass Down Low (Static Revenger Remix)
6. Jaymo & Andy George - Pocket Song (Original mix)
7. All The Lights - Chasing Colours (Original mix)
8. Art vs Science - A.I.M. Fire (The Immigrant Remix)
9. Designer Drugs feat. Justin Pearson - Dead Meat (Fukkk Offf Remix)
10. Albin Myers - Air Drums (Original mix)
11. Gypsy & The Cat - Jona Vark (Tommy Trash Remix)
12. Tommy Trash - The End (Original Mix)
13. Laidback Luke & Steve Aoki feat. Lil Jon - Turbulence (Original mix)
14. Skrillex - Scary Monsters And Nice Sprites (Noisia Remix)
15. South Central - The Day I Die (The Prodigy Rework)
16. Chase & Status - Blind Faith (Original mix)
17. Dem Slackers - Global Grind (Original mix)
18. Autoerotique - Turn Up The Volume AUNV01100254] (Original mix)
19. Jump Jump Dance Dance - 2.0 (Laidback Luke Remix)
20. Marvin Priest - Own This Club (Tom Piper Remix)
21. Malente vs. Azzido Da Bass - Hunting (Original mix)
22. The Subs - Face Of The Planet (Original mix)

== Year-end charts ==
Chart (2011)	Position
Australian ARIA Dance Albums Chart Top 50	5
Australian ARIA Top 50 Compilations Chart	10
