= Tommy Trash =

Australian DJ, record producer, and remixer

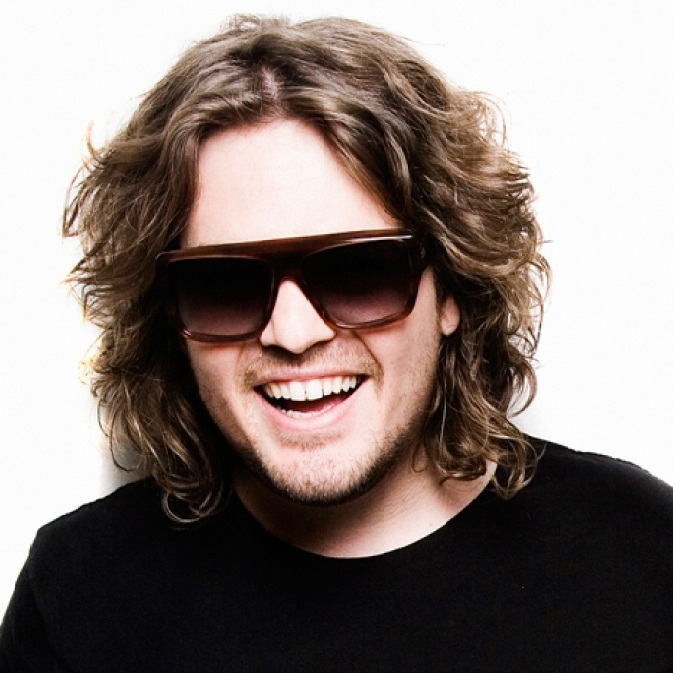
- Tommy Trash

Background information
- Born: Thomas Matthew Olsen; Bundaberg, Queensland, Australia
- Genres: Electro house; big room house; progressive house; EDM
- Occupations: DJ; producer; remixer
- Instruments: Ableton; keyboards; laptop; DJ decks
- Years active: 2006-present
- Labels: Ministry of Sound Australia; Fool's Gold Records; Mixmash Records; Musical Freedom; Spinnin' Records; Size Records; Mau5trap; Refune Records; Owsla; Armada
- Website: tommytrash.com

Thomas Matthew Olsen, better known by his stage name Tommy Trash, is an Australian DJ, record producer, and remixer. He currently resides in Los Angeles, California, and is signed to Ministry of Sound Australia.

== Biography ==
=== Early life ===
Thomas Olsen was born in Bundaberg, Queensland. He attended Walkervale State School and later Kepnock State High School. From an early age Thomas was proficient at piano and trumpet and was classically trained in both, he excelled at music in general and could play almost anything with a little practice.

=== Music career ===
The ARIA Music Awards of 2009 nomination of Trash is considered as one of the highlights of 2011. Ever since he appeared on the scene in 2006, Tommy has been on charts and dance floors with over 50 productions (originals and remixes).

His peak era would begin in mid-2011, thanks to one of his most recognisable tunes, titled "The End". This has been one of his largest hits to date. This made him quickly noticed by high-profile DJs such as Tiësto, David Guetta, Swedish House Mafia, Afrojack, and Laidback Luke. "The End" pushed Tommy further into international fame.

Before "The End", he launched "All My Friends" in 2010, collaborating with Tom Piper and Mr. Wilson on the vocals, who has already lent his voice in Tommy's song, "Need Me To Stay", a song nominated by the ARIA Awards as a "Best Dance Record" in 2009. "All My Friends" managed to peak 6 weeks straight on the ARIA Club Charts. Due to its success, it was re-edited and remastered by Ministry of Sound on the United Kingdom and Germany, and peaked at 11 in the UK Cool Cuts chart.

Tommy also launched his music on worldwide labels, such as Spinnin, Refune, SIZE, Axtone, mau5trap, OWSLA, Boys Noize, Musical Freedom and Fool's Gold. He has collaborated with other producers such as A-Trak. Digitalism, Sebastian Ingrosso and Wolfgang Gartner, and he has made remixes for artists like Deadmau5, Empire of the Sun, Swedish House Mafia, Sub Focus, Zedd, Steve Aoki, plus many more.

In 2012, the 55th Annual Grammy Awards nominated Tommy for his remix of Deadmau5' song ""The Veldt"".

== In compilations ==
The first Tommy Trash song that appeared on a mainstream compilation was "It's A Swede Thing" which was collaborated with Goodwill, this song was included on the downloadable edition of the Cream compilation "Cream Summer 2007". This gained Olsen some popularity and he went on to have his song "All My Friends" (with Tom Piper and Mr. Wilson) featured on the 2012 edition of the Ministry of Sound compilation known as The Annual, despite the name this edition of The Annual was actually released in 2011. This gave Olsen even more fame, and "All My Friends" was his most mainstream and successful single to date. "All My Friends" also received many remixes. The next song to feature on a mainstream album was "Future Folk", this was featured on another Cream compilation, this time it was "Cream Club Anthems 2012".

Most of Olsen's songs are featured on the "Musical Freedom" compilations. These are usually mixed by the likes of Dada Life, Steve Aoki, Tiesto, R3hab, Hard Rock Sofa and Swanky Tunes

Olsen has mixed a Ministry of Sound CD entitled "Inspired"; the CD was released on 17 March 2014 on Ministry of Sound/Data Records and Olsen's label, Ministry of Sound Australia.

== Discography ==
=== Extended plays ===
List of extended plays
Title	Details
Amsterdam	Released: 21 February 2008; Label: Hussle Black; Format: Digital download, Vinyl, CD
The End	Released: 21 April 2011; Label: Downright Music; Format: Digital download
Monkey See Monkey Do	Released: 4 March 2013; Label: Mau5trap; Format: Digital download, Vinyl
Luv U Giv	Released: 20 November 2015; Label: Fool's Gold; Format: Digital download
Group Chat	Released: 18 November 2016; Label: Fool's Gold; Format: Digital download

=== Mix albums ===
Title	Details
Electro House Sessions (with Stafford Brothers)	Released: 11 August 2007; Label: Ministry of Sound Australia; Format: CD
Electro House Sessions 2 (with Stafford Brothers)	Released: 22 March 2008; Label: Ministry of Sound Australia; Format: CD
Onelove Volume 10: Mobile Disco 2009 (with Grant Smillie and Acid Jacks)	Released: 25 November 2008; Label: Onelove; Format: CD
Sessions Six (with Goodwill and Dirty South)	Released: 16 May 2009; Label: Ministry of Sound Australia; Format: CD
Sessions Seven (with Stafford Brothers and Steve Aoki)	Released: 14 May 2010; Label: Ministry of Sound Australia; Format: CD
The Annual 2011 (with Hook N Sling)	Released: 29 October 2010; Label: Ministry of Sound Australia; Format: CD
Sessions Eight (with Sam La More)	Released: 13 May 2011; Label: Ministry of Sound Australia; Format: CD
The Annual 2012 (with Tom Piper)	Released: 28 October 2011; Label: Ministry of Sound Australia; Format: CD
Inspired	Released: 16 March 2014; Label: Ministry of Sound; Format: CD

=== Charted singles ===
List of singles as lead artist, with selected chart positions and certifications, showing year released and album name
Title	Year	Peak chart positions										Certifications	Album
Title	Year	AUS	BEL (FL)	FRA	GER	IRE	NLD	NZ	SWE	SWI	UK	Certifications	Album
"Need Me to Stay" (feat. Mr. Wilson)	2009	14	—	—	—	—	—	—	—	—	—		Non-album singles
"The Bum Song" (with Tom Piper)	2010	40	—	—	—	—	—	32	—	—	—		Non-album singles
"Reload" (with Sebastian Ingrosso)	2012	—	48	—	—	—	—	—	—	—	—		Until Now (Deluxe Edition)
"Sunrise (Won't Get Lost)" (vs. The Aston Shuffle)	2012	—	122	—	—	—	—	—	—	—	—		Non-album singles
"Reload" (with Sebastian Ingrosso featuring John Martin)	2013	20	—	152	89	13	66	—	5	70	3	GLF: 2× Platinum; BPI: Silver	Non-album singles
"—" denotes a single that did not chart.

=== Remixes ===
2006

- Sugiurumn – Star Baby (Goodwill & Tommy Trash Remix)

2007

- Craig Obey - Music in My Mind
- Tommy Trash - Slide (Tommy Trash Electro Cut)
- Green Velvet (feat. Walter Phillips) – Shake & Pop
- Goodwill & Tommy Trash - It's a Swede Thing
- Delta Goodrem – Believe Again
- The Veronicas – Hook Me Up
- Benjamin Bates – Two Flies
- Tom Novy – Unexpected
- Betty Vale - Jump On Board
- Arno Cost & Arias – Magenta (Goodwill & Tommy Trash Exclusive Remix)
- Anton Neumark – Need You Tonight (Goodwill & Tommy Trash Remix)
- Grafton Primary – Relativity
- Armand Van Helden – I Want Your Soul
- My Ninja Lover – 2 x 2 (My Ninja Lover vs. Tommy Trash Edit)

2008

- The Camel Rider & Mark Alston (feat. Mark Shine) – Addicted
- Faithless – Insomnia 2008 (Tommy Trash Electro Mix)
- Karton – Never Too Late (Tommy Trash & fRew's "fRew.T.Trash" Mix)
- Mason – The Ridge
- Dabruck & Klein – Cars
- Soul Central (feat. Abigail Bailey) – Time After Time
- Meck (feat. Dino) – So Strong
- House of Pain vs. Mickey Slim - Jump Around (Tommy Trash Edit)
- Kaskade – Step One Two

2009

- Chili Hi Fly (feat. Jonas) – I Go Crazy
- FRew & Chris Arnott (feat. Rosie Henshaw) – My Heart Stops (Tommy Trash Remix/Dub)
- Orgasmic & Tekitek – The Sixpack Anthem
- Neon Stereo – Feel This Real
- Lady Sovereign – I Got You Dancing

2010

- Hiroki Esashika – Kazane
- Dave Winnel – Festival City
- Bass Kleph – Duro
- Stafford Brothers (feat. Seany B) – Speaker Freakers
- DBN – Chicago
- Idriss Chebak – Warm & Oriental
- DBN & Tommy Trash (feat. Michael Feiner) - Stars
- Anané – Plastic People
- Pocket 808 (feat. Phil Jamieson) – Monster (Babe)
- Dimitri Vegas & Like Mike (feat. VanGosh) – Deeper Love
- Jacob Plant (feat. JLD) – Basslines In (Tommy Trash Remix/Dub)
- The Potbelleez – Shake It
- Tommy Trash & Tom Piper (feat. Mr Wilson) - All My Friends (Piper & Trash Remix)

2011

- fRew & Chris Arnott (feat. Rosie) – This New Style
- Ou Est le Swimming Pool - The Key
- The Immigrant – Summer Of Love (She Said)
- Tommy Trash - The End (Tommy Rework)
- Gypsy & The Cat – Jona Vark
- Grant Smillie (feat. Zoë Badwi) – Carry Me Home
- BKCA (aka Bass Kleph & Chris Arnott) – We Feel Love
- Richard Dinsdale, Sam Obernik & Hook N Sling – Edge Of The Earth
- John Dahlbäck (feat. Erik Hassle) – One Last Ride
- EDX (feat. Sarah McLeod) – Falling Out Of Love
- Dirty South & Thomas Gold (feat. Kate Elsworth) – Alive
- Moby – After
- Zedd – Shave It
- Steve Forte Rio (feat. Lindsey Ray) – Slumber
- R3hab & Swanky Tunes (feat. Max C) – Sending My Love
- Timbaland (feat. Pitbull) – Pass at Me
- Pnau - Unite Us

2012

- Swedish House Mafia vs. Knife Party – Antidote
- Steve Aoki (feat. Wynter Gordon) – Ladi Dadi
- Chris Lake – Build Up (Tommy Trash Edit)
- Nicky Romero – Toulouse
- fRew (feat. John Dubbs & Honorebel) – Wicked Woman
- Moguai & Tommy Trash – In N' Out (Tommy Trash Club Mix)
- Deadmau5 (feat. Chris James) – The Veldt
- Cubic Zirconia – Darko

2013

- Sub Focus (feat. Alex Clare) – Endorphins
- Tommy Trash - Monkey See Monkey Do (Tommy Trash Re-Edit)
- Destructo – Higher
- Empire of the Sun – Celebrate

2015

- Caribou – Can't Do Without You
- Tiga (feat. Pusha T) – Bugatti

2016

- Dillon Francis & Kygo (feat. James Hersey) - Coming Over
- Ookay - Thief
- Empire of the Sun - High and Low

2017

- GRiZ (feat. Cory Enemy & Natalola) - What We've Become

2020

- Deadmau5 and Keisza - Bridged by a Lightwave

=== Writing and production credits ===
List of production work for other artists, with other performing artists and co-producers, showing year released and album name
Title	Year	Performing artist(s)	Co-producer(s)	Album
"Crying Out for Help"	2012	Example	Example	The Evolution of Man
"Take Me"	2013	Tiësto featuring Kyler England	Tiësto; Showtek; Richard Furch^{[a]}	Club Life, Vol. 3 - Stockholm
"Mr President"	2014	Kylie Minogue	Madame Buttons^{[a]}	Kiss Me Once
"Won't Forget You"	2022	Example and Tommy Trash featuring Window Kid	James Angus	We May Grow Old But We Never Grow Up

Notes

- ^{^[a]} signifies a vocal producer.
