= Sessions Four =

Ministry of Sound Sessions Four

Compilation album by Various artists. Mixed by John Course and Dirty South
- Released: 2007
- Genre: Electro house; dance
- Label: Ministry of Sound

Series chronology
Sessions Three (2006)	Ministry of Sound Sessions Four (2007)	Sessions Five (2008)

Ministry of Sound Sessions Four is a dance music compilation album and the fourth installment of the Ministry of Sound Australia "Sessions" series which started back in 2004. There are a total of 41 tracks spread across the two discs. The discs were mixed by John Course and Dirty South. This was the first appearance for Dirty South in the "Sessions" series while it was the third straight appearance for John Course. "Sessions Four" finished 2007 with the Number 2 position in the ARIA 2007 End Of Year Top 50 Dance Albums Charts and in position 4 of the ARIA Top 50 Compilations Chart for 2007.

== Track listing ==
=== Disc 1 – mixed by John Course ===
1. Gossip – Standing in the Way of Control (Headman Remix)
2. House Of Pain – Jump Around (Micky Slim Remix)
3. Toby Neal – Do You Really (Want My Love)? (Hook N Sling Remix)
4. Meck – Feels Like Home (TV Rock vs Dirty South Remix)
5. Alex Gaudino feat. Crystal Waters – Destination Calabria (Original mix)
6. TCS vs Level 42 – Lessons in Love (Mischa Daniels House Mix)
7. Armand Van Helden – NYC Beat (Original 12")
8. The Sounds – Tony The Beat (Rex The Dog Disco Mix)
9. Jurgen Paape – Take That (Original mix)
10. Space Cowboy feat. Nadia Oh – My Egyptian Lover (Original mix)
11. Green Velvet feat. Walter Phillips – Shake And Pop (Original mix)
12. Electro Funk Lovers – Are You A Lover (Original mix)
13. Freaks – The Creeps (Electro Funk Lovers Remix)
14. The Screetch – The Screetch (Original mix)
15. Katie Noonan – Time To Begin (Electro Funk Lovers Remix)
16. Jesse Garcia – Off Da Hook! (Original mix)
17. TV Rock vs The Dukes of Windsor – The Others (TV Rock Mainroom Mix)
18. The Potbelleez – Junkyard (Original mix)
19. Michael Gray feat. Steve Edwards – Somewhere Beyond (TV Rock Mix)
20. Mic Newman – Rhythm To Ya Hips (Mind Electric's Twister Mix)
21. Mind Electric – Electrify (Original mix)

=== Disc 2 – mixed by Dirty South ===
1. Dirty South &Paul Harris@ feat. Rudy – Better Day (Original mix)
2. Ryan Murgatroyd feat. Trisha – Funk Country (Micky Slim Remix)
3. The Migrants – I Thought That (Boris Dlugosch Mix)
4. Claude VonStroke – The Whistler (Aston Shuffle Mix)
5. Cicada – Cut Right Through (DJ Delicious Remix)
6. Axwell/Angello/Ingrosso/Laidback Luke – Get Dumb (Original mix)
7. Freakx Brothers – Tension (Original mix)
8. John Acquaviva pres. Swen Weber – First Stroke (Original mix)
9. Tyken feat. Awa – Every Word (Dave Spoon Remix)
10. Tommy Trash & Tom Piper – F**k To The Bass (TT Electro Remix)
11. Arno Cost & Arias – Magenta (Dave Spoon Remix)
12. Federico Franchi – Cream (Original mix)
13. Goodwill & Tommy Trash – It's A Swede Thing (Original mix)
14. Kaskade – Sorry (Dirty South Remix)
15. Tonite Only – Where the Party's At (Dada Life Remix)
16. Sneaky Sound System – UFO (Van She Tech Remix)
17. Klaxons – Gravity's Rainbow (Van She Remix)
18. Wink – Higher State Of Consciousness (Dirty South vs TV Rock Remix)
19. PoxyMusic – She Bites (Swen Weber Mix)
20. Laidback Luke feat. Steve Granville – Hypnotize (Steve Angello Remix)

== Year-end charts ==
Chart (2007)	Position
Australian ARIA Dance Albums Chart Top 50	2
Australian ARIA Top 50 Compilations Chart	4
