= Sessions One =

Ministry of Sound Sessions One

Compilation album by Various artists. Mixed by John Course and Mark Dynamix
- Released: 2004
- Genre: Electro house, dance
- Label: Ministry of Sound

Series chronology
Ministry of Sound Sessions One (2004)	Sessions Two (2005)

Ministry of Sound Sessions One is a dance music compilation album and the first installment of the Ministry of Sound Australia's "Sessions" series which started in 2004. There are a total of 41 tracks spread throughout two compact discs within this album, which were mixed by John Course and Mark Dynamix.

Sessions One was released in 2004 and came at number two on the ARIA 2004 End-of-Year Dance Albums Chart.

== Track listing ==
=== Disc 1 ===
1. Starsailor - Four To The Floor (Thin White Duke Mix)
2. Shapeshifters - Lola's Theme (Instrumental Mix)
3. Bobby Blanco - 3am (Original mix)
4. Junior Jack - Stupidisco (Original mix)
5. Switch - Get Ya Dub On (Original mix)
6. Dope & Dusted - Are U Jealous (Toby Neal Club Mix)
7. Skylark - That's More Like It (Original mix)
8. Praise Cats feat. Andrea Love - Sing (Main Mix)
9. Mr On feat. Jungle Bros - Breathe Don't Stop (Milk & Sugar Remix)
10. Mousse T. feat. Emma Lanford - Is It Cos I'm Cool? (So Phat! Remix)
11. Havana Funk - Bakiri Ban (Original mix)
12. Raul Rincon pres. Carolina Escolano - Mi Amor (Sweet Caroline Vox)
13. Martin Solveig - Rocking Music (Original mix)
14. Mr Timothy feat. Inaya Day - I Am Tha 1 (T Funk Edit)
15. Monroe - Gotta Get A Move On (Club Mix)
16. Kelis - Trick Me (E Smoove House Trick)
17. Black Rock - Blue Water (Instrumental)
18. Bini & Martini feat. Su' Su Bobien - Say Yes (The Beginerz Remix)
19. Mauro M.B.S. pres. Seven Saturdays - Dirty Vinyl Pusher (Dirty Vocal Mix)
20. Boogie Pimps - Sunny (UK Club Mix)
21. Magnolia - It's All Vain (Original mix)

=== Disc 2 ===
1. Basement Jaxx - Plug It In (Basement Jaxx Original Mix)
2. Freestylers - Push Up (DJ Bomba & J Paolo Remix)
3. Gus Gus - David (Tim Deluxe Remix)
4. Syndicate Of Law - Right On Time (Original mix)
5. Tom Neville - Just Fuck (Original mix)
6. Mylo Featuring Freeform Five - Muscle Car (Freeform Reform) [Video]
7. Stellar Project feat. Brandi Emma - Get Up Stand Up (Phunk Investigation Instrumental Club Mix)
8. Random House Project and Robert Owens - Longing (Emerson Mix)
9. Freeland - Supernatural Thing (Tom Middleton Cosmos Mix)
10. Spektrum - Kinda New (Tiefschwarz Dub Mix)
11. N.E.R.D. - She Wants To Move (Basement Jaxx Remix)
12. DJ Touche - The Paddle (Original mix)
13. Aloud - Bob O'Lean (Play Paul Remix)
14. Aaron Smith Feat. Luvli - Dancin (Fuzzy Hair Remix)
15. Craig Obey & The Elektrik Force - Coolin @ the.bar (Original mix)
16. Scissor Sisters - Comfortably Numb (Paper Faces Mix)
17. Spankox - To The Club (Highpass Club Mix)
18. Monkey Bars feat. Gabrielle Widman - Shuggie Love (Majestic 12 Mix)
19. Heavy Rock - (I Just Want To Be A) Drummer (DJ Tocadisco Remix)
20. Phil Fuldner - (Never) Too Late (Monosurround Remix)

== Year-end charts ==
Chart (2004)	Position
Australian ARIA Dance Albums Chart	2
