= Sessions Five =

Ministry of Sound Sessions Five

Compilation album by Various artists. Mixed by The Potbelleez & Goodwill
- Released: 2008
- Genre: Electro house, dance
- Label: Ministry of Sound

Series chronology
Sessions Four (2007)	Ministry of Sound Sessions Five (2008)	Sessions Six (2009)

Ministry of Sound Sessions Five is an electro house, dance music compilation album released on 31 May 2008. It features 42 tracks mixed by The Potbelleez and Goodwill and is the fifth instalment of the Ministry of Sound Australia "Sessions" series which began in 2004. The album features The Potbelleez for the only time in the Sessions series. It also contains the second appearance for Goodwill, who would also feature in Sessions Six.

Sessions Five finished in the number 4 position in the ARIA 2008 End Of Year Top 50 Dance Albums Charts and in position 7 of the ARIA Top 50 Compilations Chart for 2008.

== Track listing ==
Disc 1

1. Count And Sinden - "Beeper" (12" Mix)
2. PNAU - "Baby" (Aston Shuffle Remix)
3. Bass Kleph & Anthony Paul - "Helium" (Original mix)
4. Herve - "Cheap Thrills" (Original mix)
5. Meck - "So Strong" (Original mix)
6. Wilder & Clarke - "Stand Up" (Original mix)
7. Maverick & Tapesh feat. Terri B - "Rise" (Vocal Mix)
8. The Potbelleez - "Are You With Me" (Original mix)
9. The Cut Vs The Radiators - "Gimme Head" (The Cut & Nu-Tandique Mix)
10. Alex Gaudino - "Watch Out" (Nari & Milani Remix)
11. Sandy Vee - "Bleep" (Original mix)
12. Eddie Thoneick - "I Wanna Freak U" (Eddie Thoneick Classic Mix)
13. Tommy Trash - "Lover Lover" (Original mix)
14. Utah Saints - "Something Good" (Ian Carey Remix)
15. The Aston Shuffle Feat. Tommie Sunshine - "Stomp Yo Shoes" (Original mix)
16. Kid Cudi - "Day n Nite" (Crookers Remix)
17. Wiley - "Wearing My Rolex" (Club Edit)
18. Freemasons - "Uninvited" (Whelan & Di Scala Mix - AV Cheeky Re-Rub)
19. Mark Brown Feat. Sarah Cracknell - "The Journey Continues" (Thomas Gold 4am Dub)
20. Dabruck & Klein - "CARS" (Original mix)
21. Sharam - "The One" (Joachim Garraud & David Guetta Remix)
22. The Kic Pimpz - "No Stopping Us" (Original mix)

Disc 2

1. Buy Now - "Body Crash" (Original mix)
2. The Presets - "This Boy's In Love" (Lifelike Remix)
3. John Dahlback - "More Than I Wanted" (Original mix)
4. Martin Solveig - "C'est La Vie" (Fedde vs Martin Club Mix)
5. The Fog - "Been A Long Time" (Laidback Luke Remix)
6. Sia - "The Girl You Lost" (Sander Van Doorn Remix)
7. Eric Prydz - "Pjanoo" (Original mix)
8. Hard-Fi - "I Shall Overcome" (Axwell Remix)
9. Pitch Dark & Sgt Slick - "I Am Ready" (Original mix)
10. Hook N Sling - "The Best Thing" (Club Mix)
11. Sydney Blu - "Give It Up For Me" (Original mix)
12. Those Usual Suspects - "Greece 2000" (The DONS & DBN Remix)
13. Afrojack - "Don't Be" (Original mix)
14. Sam Sparro - "Black & Gold" (Phones As Hard As Diamonds Edit)
15. Lid Lickers feat. Kjetil Moorland - "Lazy Love" (Hook n Sling Remix)
16. Andrea Doria vs LXR - "Beauty Of Silence" (Inpetto Remix)
17. The Migrants feat. Play Paul - "Love Song" (PoxyMusic Remix)
18. Mark Knight & Funkagenda - "Man With The Red Face" (Original mix)
19. Fred Falke - "Love Theme" (Original mix)
20. Morgan Page - "The Longest Road" (Deadmau5 Remix)

== End of year charts ==
Year	Chart	Position
2008	Australian ARIA Dance Albums Chart Top 50	4
2008	Australian ARIA Top 50 Compilations Chart	7
