= Ray Isaac =

Ray Isaac may refer to:

- Ray Isaac (American football), American football quarterback
- Ray Isaac (singer), Australian singer

== See also ==
- Isaac Ray, American psychiatrist
