= The Annual =

Compilation album series by various artists
- Released: 1995–present
- Genre: Dance
- Label: Ministry of Sound
- Compiler: Boy George, Pete Tong, Judge Jules, Tall Paul, Steve Canueto, Dipesh Parmar, Roger Sanchez

The Annual is a series of compilation albums currently published annually by London-based electronic dance music brand Ministry of Sound. Described as Ministry of Sound's "flagship" series, the popular albums feature house, big beat and trance tracks popular in nightclubs, especially those in the United Kingdom.

== History ==
The Ministry of Sound had been releasing DJ mix albums since 1993, their third year of business as a nightclub, starting with the inaugural edition of the Session, mixed by Tony Humphries. As the label increasingly began to release other mix albums, The Annual was conceived to wrap up the year at the club, a retrospective of defining tracks that defined the nightclub that year. Boy George and Pete Tong, who had DJ'd at the club several times, were hired to compile and mix a disc for the album each. The album was a success, reaching number 13 on the UK Compilations Chart. The Annual II from the following year, however, was a major success, reaching number 1 on the chart. George and Tong mixed the first three albums, before Judge Jules replaced Tong for The Annual IV, and Tall Paul replaced George for the following Millennium Edition and The Annual 2000, before the series stopped using live DJs.

From 1995 to 1999, the individual releases of The Annual were denoted by Roman numerals, from The Annual to The Annual IV. In 1999, the series' titling was reorganized and all following albums were named by year, beginning with The Annual 1999 - Millennium Edition. Starting in 2001, the album was named for the year following the Autumn release date instead of the year of release, thus there is no album assigned to 2001 (aside from the Spring 2001 Annual). After the Clubbers Guide To .... 2001 (Mixed By Tall Paul) Ministry of Sound decided not to use big name DJs but to use lesser-known DJs that mix digitally, and not credit who the mixer is on the front cover. This has since been denied once, where CJ Mackintosh, Jazzy M and Marc Hughes mixed Fifteen Years in 2006, and several times since then such as on Live & Remastered (though the mixes on this box set were mixed in the 1990s). The Sessions series still continues to be mixed by a DJ.

The original British installments were often released in two versions, one featuring a jewel case and a booklet in a slipcase, and special editions that were essentially leather-bound books with shiny lettering. The leather binding stopped after some volumes, but the book idea was retained until the release of The Annual 2002, which, alongside the other Annuals of the following five years, featured slimline CD cases in a hard box. Later editions have featured various other forms of packaging.

As the series became more popular in the early 2000s, similar (though not identical) albums of the same name were licensed to Ultra Records in the United States, Ministry of Sound subsidiary labels in Australia and Germany, and Universal Music in many countries worldwide, including Italy, Mexico, Argentina, Portugal and the Philippines. These albums share many tracks with the (original) UK releases, though they are mixed in a different order and some songs are replaced with more local songs in the track listing.

Australian editions of The Annual in particular are held in much higher regard than the 21st century British editions of The Annual, as many more local and underground tracks are used, and are mixed by either well-known or underground DJs. Every edition of The Annual since The Annual 2002 has topped local charts and reach Gold or Platinum certification while remaining on the ARIA Compilation charts and Australian iTunes charts for many months.

The Annual II remains one of the biggest selling compilation albums of all time in the UK, including quite possibly the biggest selling DJ mix album in the UK. It is listed in the Guinness World Records 2001 as the "Best Selling Club Dance Compilation", with 610,000 copies sold by the publication of that book in 2000.

=== Spin-offs ===
The Ibiza Annual series began in a large selling #1 album in August 1998, as mixed by Pete Tong and Boy George. As the title suggests it contains songs big in Ibizan DJ sets. The 1999 edition, despite criticism that it didn't make full usage of the songs available, was well received as was the 2000 edition. Editions starting from 2001 were mixed digitally.

Seasonal editions began in 2001, starting with Spring 2001 (the first digitally mixed Annual). A chillout annual was also released at the end of 2001, The Chillout Annual 2002. The 1997 album Dance Nation 3 was also promoted as the follow-up to The Annual II.

== Series overview ==
Note: These refer to the albums released in the UK under the Ministry of Sound label, and not any of the alternate releases from other countries or labels.

=== Main series ===
Title	Mixed by	Release date	Catalog #	Peak chart positions		Certifications
Title	Mixed by	Release date	Catalog #	UK Comp	UK Dance	Certifications
The Annual	Boy George, Pete Tong	2 November 1995	ANNCD95	13	–	UK: Gold
The Annual II	Pete Tong, Boy George	4 November 1996	ANNCD96	1	–	UK: 2xPlatinum
The Annual III	Pete Tong, Boy George	3 November 1997	ANNCD97	1	–	UK: Platinum
The Annual IV	Judge Jules, Boy George	30 October 1998	ANNCD98	1	–	UK: Platinum
The Annual: Millennium Edition	Judge Jules, Tall Paul (DJ)	1 November 1999	ANNCD99	2	–	UK: Platinum
The Annual 2000	Judge Jules, Tall Paul	30 October 2000	ANNCD2K	1	–	UK: Platinum
The Annual 2002	Steve Canueto	6 November 2001	ANCD2K1	1	–	UK: Platinum
The Annual 2003	Dave 'Deadly' Turner	4 November 2002	ANCD2K2	1	–	UK: Platinum
The Annual 2004		3 November 2003	ANCD2K3	2	–	UK: Gold
The Annual 2005	Dipesh Parmar	1 November 2004	ANCD2K4	2	–	UK: Platinum
The Annual 2006	Dipesh Parmar	31 October 2005	ANCD2K5	2	–	UK: Platinum
The Annual 2007	Dipesh Parmar, Kev & Cass	30 October 2006	ANCD2K6	2	–	UK: Gold
The Annual 2008	Dipesh Parmar, Kev & Cass, The Cut Up Boys	29 October 2007	ANCD2K7	2	–	UK: Gold
The Annual 2009	Kev & Cass	27 October 2008	ANCD2K8	4	–	UK: Gold
The Annual 2010	Kev & Cass	2 November 2009	ANCD2K9	4	1	UK: Gold
The Annual 2011	Kev & Cass	1 November 2010	ANCD2K10	4	1	UK: Gold
The Annual 2012	Dipesh Parmar	14 November 2011	ANCD2K11	9	8	UK: Silver
The Annual 2013	Redlight	19 November 2012	ANCD2K12	13	5	UK: Silver
The Annual 2014	Redlight	11 November 2013	ANCD2K13	2	1	UK: Gold
The Annual 2015	Redlight	10 November 2014	ANCD2K14	8	2	UK: Gold
The Annual 2016	Redlight	6 November 2015	ANCD2K15	1	1	UK: Platinum
The Annual 2017	Redlight	4 November 2016	ANCD2K16	1	1	UK: Gold
The Annual 2018	Redlight	3 November 2017	ANCD2K17	2	1	UK: Gold
The Annual 2019	Redlight	9 November 2018	ANCD2K18	3	–	
The Annual 2020	Redlight	1 November 2019	ANCD2K19	2	1	
The Annual 2021	Redlight	6 November 2020	MOSCD554	3	–	
The Annual 2022	Redlight	26 November 2021	MOSCD557	4	1	
The Annual 2023	Redlight	25 November 2022	MOSCD558	4	–	
The Annual 2024	Roger Sanchez	24 November 2023	MOSCD559	5	1	
The Annual 2025	Redlight	22 November 2024 (physical); 29 November 2024 (digital download)	MOSCD560	10	1	
The Annual 2026	Sammy Porter	28 November 2025	MOSCD561	10	1	

=== Ibiza Annual series ===
Title	Mixed by	Release date	Catalog #	Peak chart positions		Certifications
Title	Mixed by	Release date	Catalog #	UK Comp	UK Dance	Certifications
The Ibiza Annual	Pete Tong, Judge Jules	1998	MOSCD2	1	–	UK: Gold
The Ibiza Annual Summer Ninety Nine	Judge Jules, Tall Paul (DJ)	1999	MOSCD6	1	–	UK: Gold
The Ibiza Annual Summer 2000	Judge Jules, Taul Paul	2000	MOSCD11	1	–	UK: Platinum
The Ibiza Annual Summer 2001	Steve Canueto	2001	MOSCD21	3	–	UK: Gold
The Annual Ibiza 2002		2002	MOSCD50	4	–	UK: Silver
Ibiza Annual 2005		2005	MOSCD109	3	–	UK: Silver
Ibiza Annual 2006		2006	MOSCD127	2	–	UK: Silver
Ibiza Annual 2007		2007	MOSCD147	2	–	UK: Silver
Ibiza Annual 2008		2008	MOSCD176	3	–	
Ibiza Annual 2011		2011	MOSCD261	3	3	
Ibiza Annual 2012		2012	MOSCD302	4	1	UK: Silver
Ibiza Annual 2013		2013	MOSCD340	6	1	
Ibiza Annual 2014	Ember & Kronic	2014	MOSCD373	9	2	

=== Other releases ===
Title	Mixed by	Release date	Catalog #	Peak chart positions		Certifications
Title	Mixed by	Release date	Catalog #	UK Comp	UK Dance	Certifications
The Annual Spring 2001	Steve Canueto	2001	MOSCD17	1	–	UK: Gold
The Annual Spring 2002	Dipesh Parmar	2002	MOSCD35	3	–	UK: Silver
The Annual Spring 2003		2003	MOSCD63	3	–	UK: Silver
The Annual Summer 2003	Deadly Dave Turner	2003	MOSCD73	5	–	
The Annual Spring 2004	Dipesh Parmar	2004	MOSCD87	6	–	
The Annual Summer 2004		2004	MOSCD95	4	–	UK: Silver
The Annual 15 Years		2010	MOSCD222	4	1	
The Annual XXV		2019	MOSCD549		1	

== Australian albums ==
Note: These albums from The Summer Annual - Summer 2000 to The 2008 Annual were distributed by EMI Music Group Australasia Pty Ltd. The 2009 Annual to The Annual 2017 were distributed by Universal Music Australia Pty Ltd under exclusive license from Ministry of Sound Australia & Ministry of Sound Recordings Ltd. As of mid-2017 all Australian Annuals are produced and distributed by Sony Music Entertainment Australia.

=== Spring releases ===
Year	Album	DJ(s)
2001	The 2002 Annual	Andy Van & Mark Dynamix
2002	The Chillout Annual 2002	Mark Dynamix
2002	The 2003 Annual	Mark Dynamix & Ultrasun
2003	The 2004 Annual	Mark Dynamix & John Course
2004	The 2005 Annual	John Course & Mark Dynamix
2005	The 2006 Annual	John Course & Mark Dynamix
2006	The 2007 Annual	John Course & Mark Dynamix
2007	The 2008 Annual	John Course & Goodwill
2008	The 2009 Annual	John Course & Goodwill
2009	The Annual 2010	John Course, The Aston Shuffle & Goodwill
2010	The Annual 2011	Hook N Sling & Tommy Trash
2011	The Annual 10 Years	John Course & Mark Dynamix
2011	The 2012 Annual	Tommy Trash & Tom Piper
2012	The Annual 2013	Tom Piper & The Only
2013	The Annual 2014	Chardy & Uberjak'd
2014	The Annual 2015	Ember & Kronic (DJ)
2015	The Annual 2016	Kronic (DJ), Ember & Dom Dolla
2016	The Annual 2017	
2018	The Annual 2019	

=== Summer releases ===
Year	Album	DJ(s)
2000	The Summer Annual - Summer 2000	Madison Avenue & Sean Quinn
2001	The Summer Annual - Summer 2001	Mark Dynamix & Andy Van
2018	The Annual 2018	

== See also ==
- Ministry of Sound
