= See What I Care =

EP by Datarock
- Released: 23 May 2007
- Recorded: 2005
- Genres: Alternative dance, electronic rock
- Length: 34:06
- Label: Young Aspiring Professionals

See What I Care is an EP by Norwegian band Datarock. It was released on 23 May 2007 by their record label, Young Aspiring Professionals.

== Track listing ==
1. "Not Me" – 3:35
2. "Do It Your Way" – 1:50
3. "See What I Care" – 3:19
4. "Stay" – 2:26
5. "New Rave Anthem" – 1:45
6. "Fa Fa Fa (Shakes Remix)" – 4:22
7. "Fa Fa Fa (Riton Turbo Disco Remix)" – 6:31
8. "I Used To Dance With My Daddy (Para One Remix)" – 4:55
9. "I Used To Dance With My Daddy (Mark Dynamix And Jaytech's Suger Daddy-O Remix)" – 5:26
