= Sessions Two =

Ministry of Sound Sessions Two

Compilation album by Various artists. Mixed by John Course and Mark Dynamix
- Released: 2005
- Genre: Electro house, dance
- Label: Ministry of Sound

Series chronology
Sessions One (2004)	Ministry of Sound Sessions Two (2005)	Sessions Three (2006)

Ministry of Sound Sessions Two is a dance music compilation album and the second installment of the Ministry of Sound Australia "sessions" series which started in 2004. There are a total of 40 tracks spread across two discs. Disc one was mixed by John Course and disc two was mixed by Mark Dynamix.

Sessions Two finished at number two on the ARIA 2005 End-of-Year Dance Albums Chart.

== Track listing ==
=== Disc 1 – Mixed by John Course ===
1. Bodyrockers - I Like The Way (Junior Jack 'Rock Da House' Club Mix)
2. Deepface - Been Good (Ivan Gough and Grant Smillie Remix)
3. Live Element - Something About You (Original mix)
4. Fast Crew - I Got You (Electro Lovers 6am Dub Remix)
5. Sander Kleinenberg - The Fruit (Grant Smillie and Ivan Gough's Mix)
6. Midas Touch - Midnight Star (Starskee Remix)
7. Mousse T. feat. Emma Lanford - Right About Now (Fuzzy Hair Vocal Mix)
8. Blaze pres. Uda feat. Barbara Tucker - Most Precious Love (DF Future 3000 Mix)
9. Exhibit A - G Minor (Original mix)
10. 100% Feat. Jennifer John - Just Can't Wait (Saturday) (Stonebridge Club Mix)
11. Paris Avenue feat. Robin One - I Want You (Original mix)
12. Tom Novy - Your Body (Original mix)
13. Max Graham vs Yes - Owner Of A Lonely Heart (Club Mix)
14. La Griffe - Make It Shine (Original mix)
15. Sharam Jey - Feel Nobody (Original mix)
16. Mylo - In My Arms (Sharam Jey Remix)
17. So Phat! - a Love Bizarre (Original mix)
18. Shapeshifters - Back To Basics (Main Vocal Mix)
19. Haji & Emanuel - Weekend (ATFC's Wet Weekend Mix)
20. Paul Johnson - She Got Me On (Original mix)
21. Cabin Crew - star2fall (Original mix)

=== Disc 2 – Mixed by Mark Dynamix ===
1. Juliet - Avalon (Original mix)
2. Trentemøller - Beta Boy (Original mix)
3. Coburn - We Interrupt This Program (Original mix)
4. Dr. Kucho! & Gregor Salto - Can't Stop Playing (Original mix)
5. Roman Flügel - Gehts Noch? (Original mix)
6. H - Man - Manga (Original mix)
7. PoxyMusic - Our Break (Original mix)
8. Tom Neville - Buzz Junkies (Original mix)
9. Yoshimoto - Du What U Du (Trentemøller Remix)
10. David Guetta - The World Is Mine (Deep Dish Remix)
11. Narcotic Thrust - When The Dawn Breaks (Cicada Remix)
12. Reflekt feat. Delline Bass - Need To Feel Loved (Seb Fontaine's & Jay P's TYPE Remix)
13. Steve Angello - Acid (Original mix)
14. Dave Mc Cullen - B*tch (Original mix)
15. Etienne de Crecy - Overnet (Original mix)
16. The Drill - The Drill (Original mix)
17. Benjamin Bates - Whole (Steve Angello´s OverSized Dub)
18. Fischerspooner - Just Let Go (Thin White Duke Mix)
19. The Killers - Mr Brightside (Jacques Lu Cont's Thin White Duke Mix)

== Year-end charts ==
Chart (2005)	Position
Australian ARIA Dance Albums Chart	2
