= California (Datarock EP) =

EP by Datarock
- Released: 2011
- Genre: Dance-punk, funk, nu-disco
- Length: 18:20
- Label: Young Aspiring Professionals
- Producer: Datarock

Datarock chronology
Red (2009)	California (2011)

California is an EP by Norwegian dance-punk duo Datarock, released in 2011 included within the Catcher in the Rye EP a.k.a. The Most Extravagant Single in History. The EP features the title track "California" a song the band bills as part of a new modern rock musical about Datarock traveling the world. The band continues its often playful approach to music citing references to both The Beach Boys' "California Girls" and Porno for Pyros' "Pets" in the song "Great Pets". The EP was the first step in Datarock's plans to release a musical.

== Track listing ==
1. "Life is a Musical" - 2:06
2. "Great Pets" - 2:12
3. "California" - 2:42
4. "Roller Coaster" - 2:45
5. "Walk Away" - 2:56
6. "California Souldrop RMX" - 6:01

== Reception ==
The EP was reviewed negatively by Richard Scott at Purple Sneakers; however Kristie Bertucci at Grimy Goods found it enjoyable.
