= Sessions Three =

2006 compilation album by various artists

Ministry of Sound Sessions Three

Compilation album by Various artists. Mixed by John Course and Goodwill
- Released: 2006
- Genres: Electro house, dance
- Label: Ministry of Sound

Series chronology
Sessions Two (2005)	Ministry of Sound Sessions Three (2006)	Sessions Four (2006)

Ministry of Sound Sessions Three is a dance music compilation album and the 3rd installment of the Australian Ministry of Sound "sessions" series which started in 2004. There are a total of 40 tracks formatted across two discs, mixed by John Course and Goodwill. This was Goodwill's first appearance in the Sessions series, and Course's third.

Sessions Three finished in 2006 at number seven on the ARIA 2006 End-of-Year Top 50 Dance Albums Chart and number eight on the ARIA Top 50 Compilations Chart.

== Track listing ==
=== Disc 1 ===
1. Dirty South vs Evermore – It's Too Late (Dirty South Remix)
2. Bob Sinclar – World, Hold On (Club Mix 1 (8:06))
3. T-Funk feat. Katie Underwood – Be Together (Electro Funk Lovers Remix)
4. Chocolate Puma – Always and Forever (Original mix)
5. Joey Negro – Make A Move On Me (Vocal Club Mix)
6. Chanel – My Life (Original mix)
7. Jean Claude Ades – Fly Away (Original mix)
8. Gaelle – Give it Back (Electro Funk Lovers Remix)
9. Teamsters – Feels Like Love (King Unique Mix)
10. Royksopp – What Else Is There (Trentemoller Remix)
11. Beatfreakz – Somebody's Watching Me (Original Mix)
12. Craig Obey – Music In My Mind (Album Version)
13. MYNC Project – Something On My Mind (TV Rock / Switch Remix)
14. Skye – Love Show (Tom Novy Remix)
15. Supermode – Why (Original mix)
16. Mish Mash Feat. Lois – Speechless (King Unique Dub)
17. Mind Electric – Dirty Cash (Dirty South Remix)
18. Tonite Only – Danger (The Bomb) (Original mix)
19. Vandalism – Never Say Never (Dirty South Remix)
20. Eddie Thoneick vs Kurd Maverick – Love Sensation (Club Mix)

=== Disc 2 ===
1. The Similou – All This Love (Tonite Only Remix)
2. Till West – Same Man (Original mix)
3. Sugiurumn feat. Miyuki Hatakeyama – Star Baby (Axwell Remix)
4. Toby Neal – My Love (Original mix)
5. Nick Jay feat. Ray Isaac – I Don't Give A Damn (Goodwill Remix)
6. Tim Deluxe – I Don't Care (Original mix)
7. Beats and Styles – Dance Dance Dance (DJ Monique Remix)
8. Freaks – The Creeps (You're Giving Me) (Vandalism Remix)
9. The Loose Cannons – La La La (Bothered) (Arabian Bah Mitzvah Goodwill Re-Edit)
10. Coburn – Give Me Love (Lutzenkirchen Mix)
11. Paul Woolford Present Bobby Peru – Erotic Discourse (Original mix)
12. The Knife – Silent Shout (Williams Remix)
13. Patric & Timo – Du Riechst So Gut (Timo's Das Hat Mir Noch Keiner Gesagt Mix)
14. Switch – A Bit Patchy (Original mix)
15. Danny Freakazoid (Original Version) – Discount (Original mix)
16. Annie – Chewing Gum (Mylo Remix) [Video]
17. Mark Dynamix & Jaytech – Identify Me (Daniel Taylor Remix)
18. MYNC Project and Danny Rampling – Strobelight (Original mix)
19. Shakedown – Fantasy (Sharam Jey Remix)
20. Sucker DJs – Lotta Lovin (Paradise Soul)

== Year-end charts ==
Chart (2006)	Position
Australian ARIA Dance Albums Chart Top 50	7
Australian ARIA Top 50 Compilations Chart	8
