= Sessions Six =

2009 compilation album

Compilation album by Various artists. Mixed by Goodwill, Tommy Trash and Dirty South
- Released: May 16, 2009
- Genre: Electro house, dance
- Label: Ministry of Sound

Series chronology
Sessions Five (2008)	Sessions Six (2009)	Sessions Seven (2010)

Ministry of Sound Sessions Six is a dance music compilation album and the sixth installment of the Ministry of Sound Australia "sessions" series. The album consists of 61 tracks spread across three discs, and was the first of the Sessions compilations to contain three discs. By contrast, the previous album in the series had two discs.

Disc one was mixed by William 'Goodwill' Rappaport, Disc two was mixed by Tommy Trash and Disc three was mixed by Dirty South. Remixes of tracks by notable artists on the compilation include The Presets, Calvin Harris, Lady Sovereign, Lily Allen, La Roux, The Ting Tings and The All-American Rejects. "Sessions Six" finished 2009 with the second position in the ARIA 2009 End Of Year Top 50 Dance Albums Charts and in fourth position of the ARIA Top 50 Compilations Chart of 2009.

== Track listing ==
=== Disc 1 (Mixed by Goodwill) ===
1. Kid Cudi - Day 'n' Nite (Crookers Remix)
2. Rudenko - Everybody (Extended Mix)
3. Fedde le Grand feat. Mitch Crown - Scared of Me (Extended)
4. Calvin Harris - I'm Not Alone (deadmau5 Mix)
5. Cristian Marchi - We Are Perfect (Club Mix)
6. Empire of the Sun - We Are The People (Burns Remix)
7. Sidney Samson - Riverside (Original mix)
8. MSTRKRFT - Bounce (Radio Edit)
9. DADA, Obernik, Harris - Stereo Flo (Extended Mix)
10. Lily Allen - The Fear (Dresden & Johnston Club)
11. Martin Solveig - One 2, 3 Four (MS club vox mix)
12. Eddie Thoneick feat. Michael Finer - Don't Let Me Down (Original mix)
13. Sneaky Sound System - It's Not My Problem (Thin White Duke Remix)
14. Albin Myers - Times Like These (EDX's Indian Summer Remix)
15. Stafford Brothers vs Hoxton Whores feat. Frank Stafford - Wherever (Original mix)
16. Oliver Twizt - You're Not Alone (Bingo Players Remix)
17. Sgt Slick - Right In The Night (Club Mix)
18. Slumdogz - Jai Ho (Wez Clarke Remix)
19. Steve Angello & Laidback Luke feat. Robin S. - Show Me Love (Extended Mix)
20. The Cube Guys - Be Free (The Cube Guys Vokal Mix)
21. Wolfgang Gartner - Flashback (Original mix)
22. Martijn Ten Velden - Together (Original mix)

=== Disc 2 (Mixed by Tommy Trash) ===
1. Tommy Trash feat. Mr Wilson - Need Me To Stay (Original mix)
2. The Presets - If I Know You (Tom Middleton Remix)
3. The Ting Tings - Fruit Machine (Dave Spoon Remix)
4. Tiga - Shoes (Mr. Oizo Remix)
5. N.A.S.A. feat. Kanye West, Lykke Li, Santogold - Gifted (The Aston Shuffle Remix)
6. Jesse Rose - Touch My Horn (Original mix)
7. Sidney Samson feat. Lady Bee - Shut Up & Let It Go (Original mix)
8. DJ Rockid - Girlz (Original mix)
9. Lady Sovereign - So Human (Sinden Remix)
10. Busy P & Murs - To Protect And Entertain (Crookers Remix)
11. Tekitek & Orgasmic - The Sixpack Anthem (Tommy Trash Remix)
12. The Aston Shuffle feat. Danimal Kingdom - Do You Want More? (Magik Johnson Remix)
13. Mastiksoul - Run For Cover (Original mix)
14. Bloc Party - Signs (Armand Van Helden Remix)
15. The All-American Rejects - Gives You Hell (The Bloody Beetroots Remix)
16. La Roux - Quicksand (Beni's Sinking At 1.56 Mix)
17. Deadmau5 - Ghosts N Stuff (Original mix)
18. Dance Area - AA 24 7 (Original mix)
19. Laidback Luke & A-Trak - Shake It Down (Original mix)
20. Planet Funk - Lemonade (Benny Benassi Extended Remix)
21. Yeah Yeah Yeahs - Zero (Erol Alkan Rework)
22. The Bloody Beetroots - Cornelius (Mix Oi!)

=== Disc 3 (Mixed by Dirty South) ===
1. Axwell/Ingrosso/Angello/Laidback Luke feat. Deborah Cox - Leave The World Behind (Dirty South Remix)
2. Funkagenda & Exacta - Mad Money (Kim Fai Kredit Krunch Remix)
3. Wippenberg - Chakalaka (Original mix)
4. Scan X - Midnight (Julian Jeweil Mix)
5. Todd Watson & Jason Singh - The World As You Know It (Nordean Dub)
6. Solee - Jule (Original mix)
7. Fatboy Slim vs Koen Groeneveld - The Rockafeller Skank (Original mix)
8. House*Less - Tribar (Original mix)
9. Harry 'Choo Choo' Romero & José Nunez - Lifting Me High (DJ DLG Huge Mix)
10. Pryda - Reeperbahn (Original mix)
11. 11.A) Arno Cost / 11.B) Cicada - Cyan / The Things You Say 'Acapella' (Original mix)
12. Afrojack - Esther (Original mix)
13. Doman & Gooding feat. Dru & Lincoln - Runnin' (Mark Knight & Funkagenda's Done or Dusted Mix)
14. Dirty South feat. Rudy - We Are (Original mix)
15. Sebastian Ingrosso - Laktos (Original mix)
16. Dirty South - Alamo (Original mix)
17. The Heller & Farley Project - Ultra Flava (Martijn Ten Velden Remix)

== Year-end charts ==
Chart (2009)	Position
Australian ARIA Dance Albums Chart Top 50	2
Australian ARIA Top 50 Compilations Chart	4
