= Datarock Datarock =

Studio album by Datarock
- Released: April 4, 2005
- Recorded: 2003–2004
- Studio: Duper (Bergen)
- Genre: Dance-punk
- Length: 42:19
- Label: Young Aspiring Professionals
- Producers: Yngve Sætre; Jørgen Træen

Datarock chronology
Datarock Datarock (2005)	Red (2009)

Professional ratings
Review scores
Source	Rating
Allmusic	3.5/5 stars
Pitchfork Media	(7.8/10)

Datarock Datarock is the debut studio album by Norwegian dance-punk duo Datarock, released on April 4, 2005. The duo's hit single, "Computer Camp Love", is a playful song based on the 1984 American comedy Revenge of the Nerds and almost parodies "Summer Nights". The album was later released in 2007 to North America and included the music videos for "Bulldozer", "Computer Camp Love", and "Fa-Fa-Fa".

The album cover appeared on many apple iPod advertisements. "The New Song" is used by the NHL's Utah Mammoth as their theme song.

== Track listing ==
=== Original version ===
1. "Bulldozer" – 1:59
2. "I Used to Dance with My Daddy" – 4:53
3. "Computer Camp Love" – 3:08
4. "Fa-Fa-Fa" – 5:08
5. "Princess" – 3:45
6. "Sex Me Up" – 3:07
7. "Nightflight to Uranus" – 4:17
8. "Ugly Primadonna" – 3:43
9. "Maybelline" – 4:02
10. "Laurie" – 4:25
11. "The Most Beautiful Girl" – 3:56

=== North American release ===
1. "Bulldozer" - 01:59
2. "I Used to Dance with My Daddy" - 04:52
3. "Computer Camp Love" - 03:08
4. "Fa-Fa-Fa" - 05:08
5. "Princess" - 03:45
6. "Ganguro Girl" - 03:25
7. "See What I Care" - 03:18
8. "Laurie" - 04:25
9. "The New Song" - 02:34
10. "Ugly Primadonna" - 03:43
11. "Sex Me Up" - 03:07
12. "The Most Beautiful Girl" - 03:56
13. "I Will Always Remember You" - 04:04
