= Angello =

Angello is a surname. Notable people with the surname include:

- Anthony Angello (born 1996), American ice hockey player;
- Steve Angello (born 1982), Greek-Swedish DJ, producer, remixer, and record label owner.

== See also ==
- Angelo
