= Datarock =

Norwegian electronic rock band

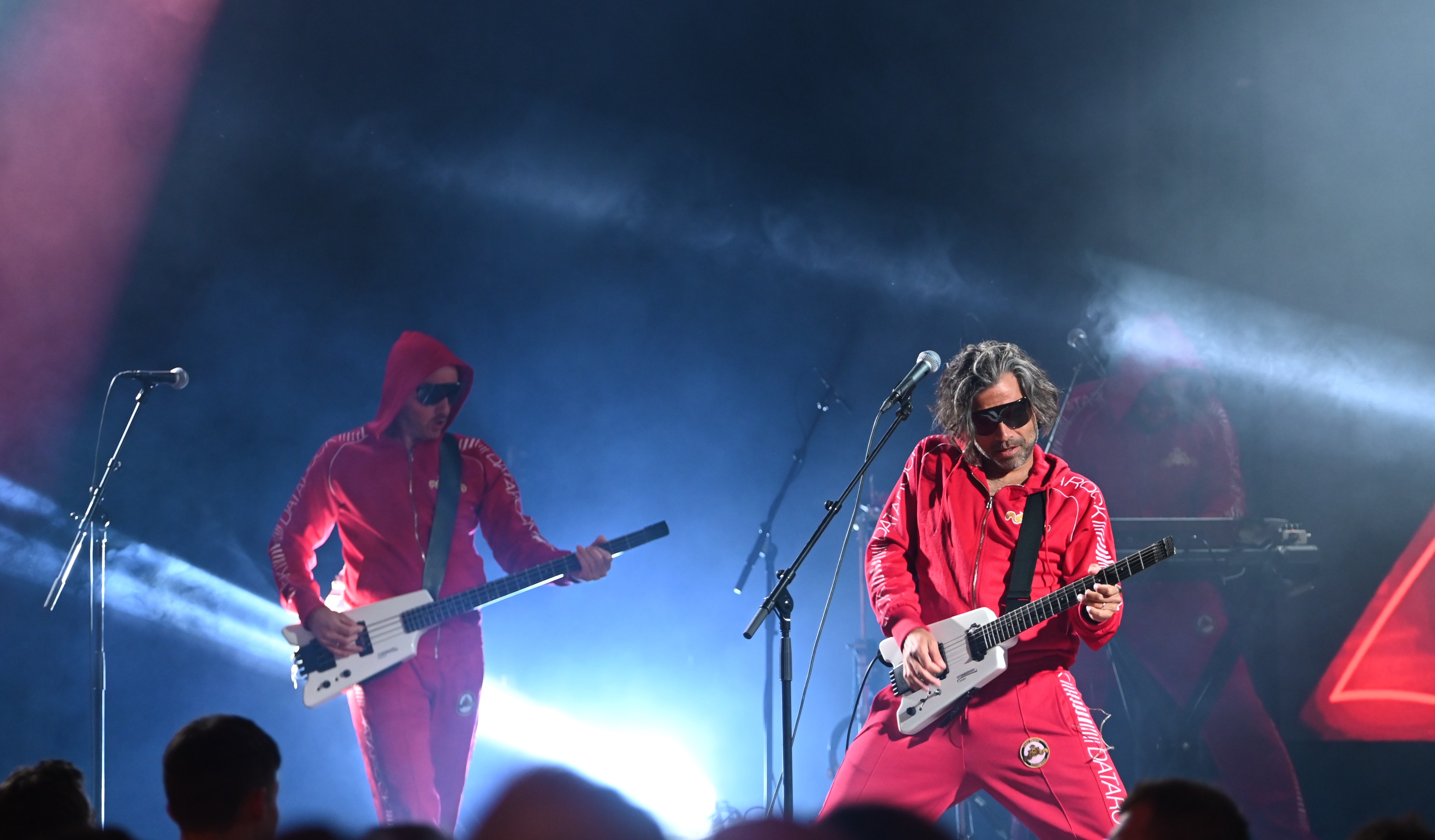
- Datarock performing at Moldejazz 2009

Background information
- Origin: Bergen, Norway
- Genres: Electronic rock, dance-punk, post-punk revival
- Years active: 2000–present
- Labels: Young Aspiring Professionals (current), Dim Mak Records (former)
- Members: Fredrik Saroea; Ketil Mosnes; Øyvind Solheim; Stig Narve Brunstad
- Past members: Kevin O'Brien; Tom Mæland; Adrian Meehan; Tarjei Strøm; Kjetil Møster; Thomas Larssen
- Website: http://datarockmusic.com

Datarock is a Norwegian electronic rock band. The band, known for wearing red jumpsuits, formed in 2000. Original personnel were Fredrik Saroea, Ketil Mosnes and Kevin O'Brien, who soon hired Tom Mæland. O'Brien and Mæland later left the band, but the duo of Saroea and Mosnes continued the project.

Their name is derived from the Norwegian word for computer – datamaskin and the word rock (meaning rock music made on a computer).

As of 2018, they have switched out the red tracksuits with all-black tracksuits. The band currently consists of Fredrik Saroea, Ketil Mosnes, Øyvind Solheim and Stig Narve Brunstad.

== Releases ==
The band has released four EPs and their debut album, Datarock Datarock, was released in 2005 in 10 countries on the band's own label, YAP (Young Aspiring Professionals), receiving favourable reviews, especially in the UK. They made an appearance in Australia's Triple J Hottest 100 with the single "Computer Camp Love" in 2005, placing at number 12. Saroea has commented that Australia was the only country to pick up Datarock early aside from their homeland. This song was #88 on Rolling Stone's list of the 100 Best Songs of 2007.

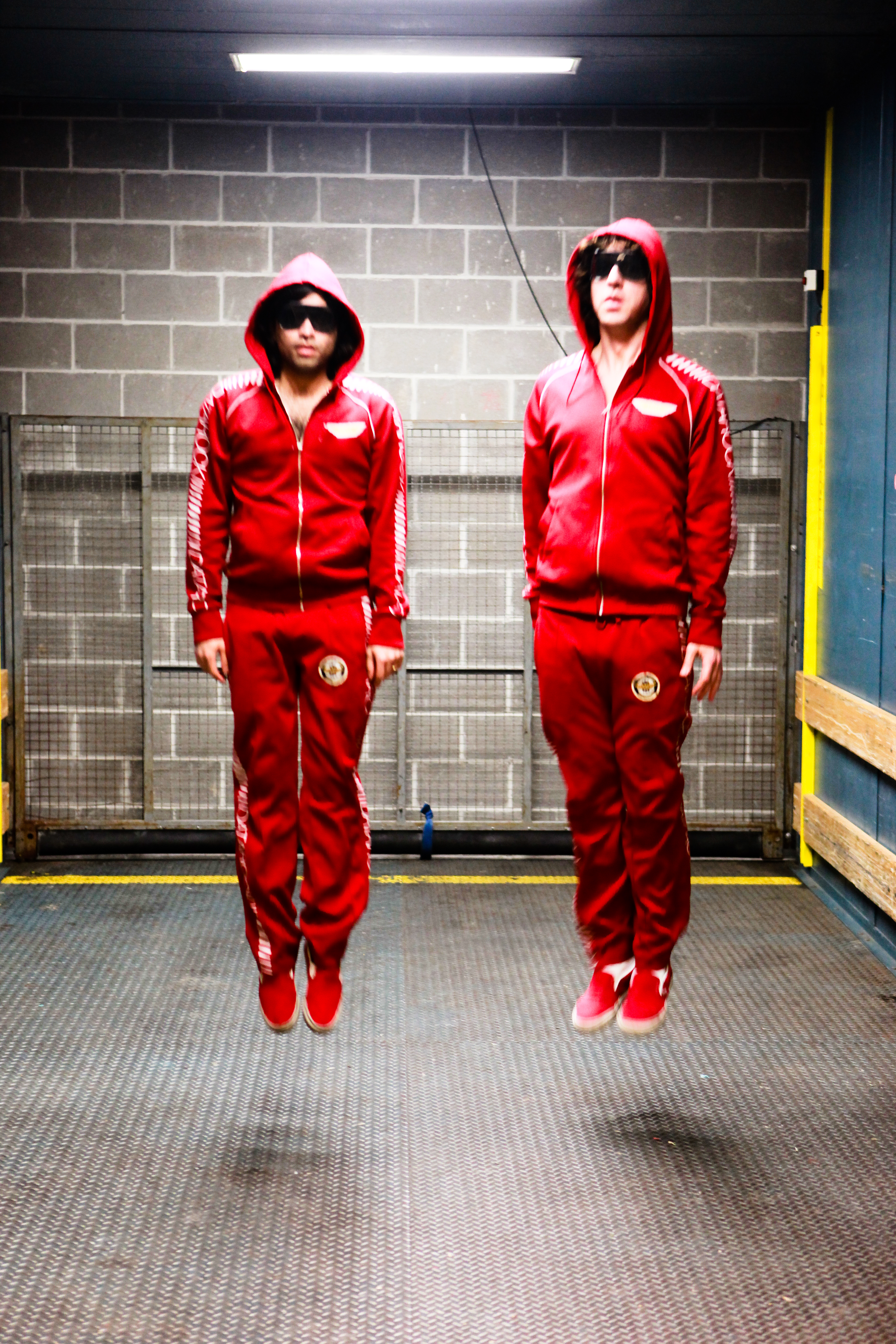
Datarock at SXSW.

Their song "Fa-Fa-Fa" was featured in a Coca-Cola advert, and is also featured in Ace Ventura Jr.: Pet Detective, NHL 08, FIFA 08, and NBA Live 08. It also appears in The Sims 2: FreeTime, and The Sims' video team was asked to create a custom music video for "Fa-Fa-Fa". Another one of their songs, "New Song", is featured in Madden NFL 08. In addition, "I Used to Dance with My Daddy" is featured in UEFA Euro 2008 and Need for Speed: ProStreet (only remix version), also "True Stories" is featured in FIFA 09. Datarock is also featured in FIFA 10 with "Give It Up".

Datarock was also featured in an Apple advertisement for the fourth generation iPod Nano. The ad showed the song "Fa-Fa-Fa" playing on an orange iPod Nano. The cover art for Datarock Datarock was also shown. "Fa-Fa-Fa" is also featured as a free premium track on the iPhone/iPod Touch game Tap Tap Revenge 3.

Fredrik Saroea also has solo aspirations and has recorded several individual tracks, including a duet with fellow Norwegian pop-star Annie for the song "I Will Always Remember You", which has been included on later presses of the band's debut LP.

Datarock's song "True Stories". featuring lyrics made up entirely of Talking Heads song titles is featured as a promotional download in MP3 format from The Sims 3.

Their song "Dance" was used in an episode of the MTV reality show Jersey Shore.

Their song "Amarillion" was used in a key scene in the Chuck episode "Chuck vs. the Nacho Sampler".

Their song "Fa-Fa-Fa" was used in an episode of the Comedy Central series, Workaholics.

Their song "Smile for the Camera" was used in an episode of the Nick Jr. Channel series Yo Gabba Gabba.

Their song "Fa-Fa-Fa" was also used by Google to promote the "Material Design" language on their Android mobile operating system.

A looped instrumental version of "Fa-Fa-Fa" is also the default alarm sound on Logitech Squeezebox devices.

In 2018, they released their first studio album in nine years, Face the Brutality, which received very positive reviews in Norwegian and international press. They also released a music video for their single, "Laugh in the Face of Darkness", created by the videographer Sjur Kristian Pollen.

== Members ==
Current

- Fredrik Saroea – vocals, guitars, drums, keyboards (2000–present)
- Ketil Mosnes – bass, programming, keyboards, backing vocals (2000–2009, 2016–present)
- Øyvind Solheim – drums, backing vocals (also plays in the band Ungdomskulen) (2016–present)
- Stig Narve Brunstad – keyboards, backing vocals (2005–2009, 2016–present)

Past

- Kevin O'Brien – vocals (2000)
- Tom Mæland – keyboards (2000–2003)
- Tarjei Strøm – drums (also plays in the band Ralph Myerz and the Jack Herren Band) (2009–2015)
- Kjetil Møster – saxophone, percussion, keyboards, vocals (2009–2016)
- Adrian Meehan – drums (2000–2014)
- Thomas Larssen – bass guitar (also plays in the band Ralph Myerz and the Jack Herren Band) (2010–2016)

== Discography ==
=== Studio albums ===
- Datarock Datarock (2005)
- Red (2009)
- The Musical (2015)
- Face the Brutality (2018)
- Media Consumption Pyramid (2023)

=== EPs ===
- Demo/Greatest Hits (2002)
- See What I Care (2007)
- California (2011)
- Roller Coaster (2011)
- A Fool at Forty is a Fool Indeed (2019)

=== Singles ===
- "Computer Camp Love" (2005)
- "Fa-Fa-Fa" (2006)
- "I Used to Dance With My Daddy" (2007)
- "See What I Care" (2007)
- "Princess" (2008)
- "The Pretender" (2009)
- "Give It Up" (2009)
- "Amarillion" (2009)
- "True Stories" (2009)
- "Catcher in the Rye" (2010)
- "In E" (2014)
- "Ruffle Shuffle" (2017)
- "Feathers & Wax" (2018)
- "Laugh in the Face of Darkness" (2018)
- "Digital Life" (2020)
- "Tick Tock" (2020)
- "Video Store" (2021)
- "Double Vision" (2022)
- "Heart Shaped Circle" (2023)
- "Rabbit Hole" (2023)
- "DISCObedience" (2023)
