= Sessions Seven =

2010 dance music compilation album

Ministry of Sound Sessions Seven

Compilation album by Various artists. Mixed by The Stafford Brothers, Tommy Trash & Steve Aoki
- Released: 2010
- Genres: Electro house, dance
- Label: Ministry of Sound

Series chronology
Ministry of Sound Sessions Six (2009)	Ministry of Sound Sessions Seven (2010)	Sessions Eight (2011)

Ministry of Sound Sessions Seven is a dance music compilation album and the seventh installment of the Ministry of Sound Australia "sessions" series which started back in 2004. There are a total of 63 tracks spread across the three discs. The Discs were mixed by The Stafford Brothers, Tommy Trash & Steve Aoki. This was the first appearance for all artists but Tommy Trash who appeared in Ministry of Sound Sessions Six. Disc One was mixed by The Stafford Brothers, Disc Two by Tommy Trash and Disc Three by Steve Aoki "Sessions Seven" finished 2010 with the Number 4 position in the ARIA 2010 End Of Year Top 50 Dance Albums Charts and in position 8 of the ARIA Top 50 Compilations Chart for 2010.

== Track listing ==
=== Disc 1 Mixed by Stafford Brothers ===
1. Gramophonedzie - Why Don't You (Original mix)
2. James Talk & Ridney - Forever (Original mix)
3. Ou Est Le Swimming Pool - Dance The Way I Feel (Armand Van Helden Club Mix)
4. Denzal Park - Filter Freak (Original mix)
5. Bob Sinclar feat. Vybrate, Queen Ifrica & Makedah - New New New (Avicii Meets Yellow Remix)
6. Chris Sorbello - So Lonely (Nick Galea Remix)
7. Roger Sanchez - 2Gether (Original mix)
8. Green Velvet feat. Kid Sister - Everybody Wants (Bass Kleph Remix)
9. Meck feat. Dino - Feels Like A Prayer (Rene Amesz Remix)
10. Stafford Brothers - Wasted (Original mix)
11. Paul Harris vs Eurythmics - I Want You (Original mix)
12. MYNC & Rhythm Masters ft Wynter Gordon - I Feel Love (Original mix)
13. Placebo - Bright Lights (Eddie Thoneick Remix)
14. Bobby Burns & Afrojack - Ghettoblaster (Original mix)
15. Prok & Fitch pres. Nanchang Nancy - Walk With Me (Axwell Vs Daddys Groove Remix)
16. Zoo Brazil - Fancy (Popof Remix)
17. Jump Jump Dance Dance - Show Me the Night (Nick Galea Remix)
18. Sgt Slick - Everyday (Digital LAB Remix)
19. Dirty South & Bob Sinclar - The Russian March (Original mix)
20. Itch - E & Scratch-E - Other Planets (feat. MDNA) (Style Of Eye Remix)
21. Martin Brothers - Duck Face (Original mix)

=== Disc 2 Mixed by Tommy Trash ===
1. Wiley feat. Chew Fu - Take That (Original mix)
2. Passion Pit - Little Secrets (Jack Beats Remix)
3. Itch - E & Scratch-E - r.E.f.r.E.s.h (feat. Scribe) (Tom Piper Remix)
4. Hook N Sling feat. Snob Scrilla - Gotta Make A Move (Original mix)
5. Yolanda Be Cool vs DCUP - We No Speak Americano (Original mix)
6. Cassius - Cassius 99 (Reset! Remix)
7. Vandalism - Throw Your Hands Up (Angger Dimas Remix)
8. Naughty Boy pres. Wiley feat. Emeli Sandé - Never Be Your Woman (Hervé Re-Work)
9. Fedde le Grand feat. Mr. V - Back & Forth (Full Vocal Mix)
10. Afrojack - Bangduck (Original mix)
11. Pocket 808 feat. Phil Jamieson - Monster (Babe) (Tommy Trash Ur A Fashion Slut Remix)
12. Dennis Ferrer - Hey Hey (Riva Starr Paradise Garage Remix)
13. Cutlass Supreme - Radcakes (Original mix)
14. The Subs - Mitsubitchi (Original mix)
15. Oliver Twizt - Gangsterdam (Original mix)
16. Tommy Trash - Stopwatch (Original mix)
17. Example - Watch The Sun Come Up (Devil's Gun "Zeitgeist" Remix)
18. Groove Armada - Paper Romance (Urchins Remix)
19. Goldfrapp - Rocket (Grum Remix)
20. Grum - Can't Shake This Feeling (Original mix)
21. Two Door Cinema Club - Something Good Can Work (The Twelves Remix)

=== Disc 3 Mixed by Steve Aoki ===
1. The Bloody Beetroots - Domino (Original mix)
2. Gtronic - Sucker Punch (Original mix)
3. The Only - The Only F*cking Rave Party (Gigi Barocco Remix)
4. Mustard Pimp - Paper (Original mix)
5. All Leather - I Don’t Hate F**s, God Does (Congorock Remix)
6. Seductive - Underground Sound (Original mix)
7. Sound Of Stereo - Flatland (Original mix)
8. Sandro Silva - Told Ya (Apster Remix)
9. Benny Benassi - Satisfaction (Afrojack Remix)
10. Malente vs Azzido da Bass - They're Killin' It (Aston Shuffle Remix)
11. Autoerotique - Bubonic (Drop The Lime Remix)
12. Jennifer Delano - Amsterdam (Beataucue Remix)
13. Felix Cartal feat. Johnny Whitney - Volcano (Original mix)
14. Kissy Sell Out - Garden Friends (Laidback Luke Edit)
15. SonicC & Digital LAB - Drunk Skunk (LA Riots Remix)
16. Scanners - We Never Close Our Eyes (Angry Kids Remix)
17. Tiga - What You Need (Steve Aoki Remix)
18. Dirty Disco Youth - Minds...Off (Original mix)
19. MSTRKRFT feat. John Legend - Heartbreaker - (Laidback Luke Remix)
20. Steve Aoki feat. zuper blahq - I'm In The House (Original mix)
21. The Bloody Beetroots feat. Steve Aoki & Bobermann - Warp 1977 (Original mix)
22. Rifoki - Sperm Donor (Original mix)

=== End of year charts ===
Year	Chart	Position
2010	Australian ARIA Dance Albums Chart Top 50	4
2010	Australian ARIA Top 50 Compilations Chart	8
