= Red (Datarock album) =

Studio album by Datarock
- Released: 8 June 2009
- Genres: Dance-punk, funk, nu-disco
- Length: 40:43
- Label: Young Aspiring Professionals
- Producer: Datarock

Datarock chronology
Datarock Datarock (2005)	Red (2009)	California (2011)

Singles from Red
- 1. "Give It Up"; 2. "True Stories"; 3. "The Pretender"

Professional ratings
Review scores
Source	Rating
Clash	link
Contactmusic	link
Pitchfork	(7.2/10) link
PopMatters	5/10 stars

Red is the second studio album by Norwegian dance-punk duo Datarock, released in the UK on 8 June 2009 and in the US on 1 September.

== Track listing ==
1. "The Blog" (3:11)
2. "Give It Up" (2:47)
3. "True Stories" (2:49)
4. "Dance!" (3:38)
5. "Molly" (3:20)
6. "Do It Your Way" (1:47)
7. "In the Red" (3:34)
8. "Fear of Death" (2:15)
9. "Amarillion" (4:20)
10. "The Pretender" (3:08)
11. "Back in the Seventies" (3:00)
12. "Not Me" (3:46)
13. "New Days Dawn" (3:08)

== Use in other media ==
"True Stories" was featured in FIFA 09 and "Give It Up" in FIFA 10.
