= The Aston Shuffle =

Australian electronic music act

- Origin: Canberra, Australia
- Genres: House, alternative dance
- Years active: 2006–present
- Labels: Ministry of Sound Australia (2007-2011), EMI Music Australia, Axtone, Independent, Potion Records
- Members: Vance Musgrove
- Past members: Mikah Freeman; Ross McGrath
- Website: www.theastonshuffle.com

The Aston Shuffle is the name of Australian electronic music producer and DJ Vance Musgrove. They were initially a group until Mikah Freeman left in 2021, with Musgrove continuing on as a solo artist. In addition to DJ gigs and a recording career, the group hosted a weekly radio show on the ABC's Triple J on Friday nights called Friday Night Shuffle.

== Biography ==
They rose to prominence with several remixes in 2006–2007 of Claude VonStroke's "The Whistler", Rocket Men's "Candy" and Chris Lake's "Carry Me Away", and released their debut single "For Everyone" in 2007 through the Ministry of Sound Australia's label Hussle Records, which was featured on the Ministry of Sound 2008 Annual.

Their music was regularly featured on Ministry compilations, with remixes of Pnau's "Baby", Terry Poison's "24 Hours" (featured on So You Think You Can Dance) and dance/alternative hip-hop smash hit "Dance wiv Me" from Dizzee Rascal and Calvin Harris. They also released their second single "Stomp Yo Shoes" that year working with Tommie Sunshine, and worked on their first compilation album for Ministry of Sound Australia, Mashed Four.

In 2009, the duo mixed the second disc of Ministry's Clubber's Guide to 2009, which also premiered their third single "Do You Want More". To close out a successful 2009, they were voted the number 3 DJs in Australia in the Sony inthemix50 and mixed disc 2 of The 2010 Annual for Ministry of Sound, which peaked at number 1 on the iTunes albums chart. They were voted the #1 DJs of inthemix50 in 2010, the same year they launched their Friday Night Shuffle radio show.

Their debut album Seventeen Past Midnight was released on 15 April 2011 and received a four-star review in Rolling Stone. Their track "Your Love" featured Eden Boucher of Lovers Electric on vocals, the first of two such collaborations. In 2012 a remix of their song "Won't Get Lost" by fellow Australian producer Tommy Trash was released as "Sunrise (Won't Get Lost)". It held the #1 spot on Beatport's chart for three consecutive weeks and was played by DJs such as David Guetta, Tiesto, Hardwell and Swedish House Mafia. On 2 February 2013, they supported Swedish House Mafia on their "One Last Tour" shows in Sydney and Melbourne. "Won't Get Lost" was also remixed by Rüfüs Du Sol and Flume.

On 28 March 2014, the duo released their second studio album, Photographs. It featured the gold-selling single "Tear It Down," which was co-written with Amanda Ghost and nominated for an APRA Award in the category of Best Dance Work. The album also featured vocals from Mayer Hawthorne, Joel Compass, Kaelyn Behr, Elizabeth Rose, Lila Gold, Alice Katz from Youngblood Hawke, and Will Heard. In 2015, The Aston Shuffle Spotify Sessions, a live recording taken from one of the shows on their Photographs album tour, was released.

In 2016, they released the tracks "High with You", "Only 1" and "Make a Wrong Thing Right" on The Magician's Potion Records. The tracks were played by Pete Tong, Oliver Heldens and Martin Solveig. That year they also supported The Magician on a run of US and European tour dates.

In 2016 Grammy-Award winning R&B singer Maxwell asked The Aston Shuffle to remix his song "All the Ways Love Can Feel" from his album blackSUMMERS'night (2016). The remix was released that year by Columbia Records.

In 2017, they performed at Belgium's Tomorrowland and Hï Ibiza and released a number of singles, including two new tracks on Potion Records, "Pass You By" and "Alpha Love", and a collaboration with LO'99, "Birthman".

Also in 2017, they launched Only 100s, a monthly mix series that showcases their absolute favourite tracks of the month. The duo have also done events under the Only 100s name, with a 2017 tour of Australia featuring UK acts TCTS and Icarus and a 2018 event in New York, where Vance has been based since 2015.

From 2017–2018 they toured internationally, then played 10 Australian cities in May 2018 on their "ID Tour" showcasing some of their new and upcoming material. In 2018 they were again invited to perform at Tomorrowland, alongside Pete Tong, Claptone, MK, and The Magician.

On 16 July 2021, Mikah Freeman announced his departure from the group, with The Aston Shuffle continuing on as a solo project.

== Awards ==
=== AIR Awards ===
The Australian Independent Record Awards (commonly known informally as AIR Awards) is an annual awards night to recognise, promote and celebrate the success of Australia's Independent Music sector.

Year	Nominee / work	Award	Result
2011	Seventeen Past Midnight	Best Independent Dance/Electronic Album	Nominated

== Discography ==
=== Studio albums ===
Title	Details	Peak chart positions
Title	Details	AUS
Seventeen Past Midnight	Released: 15 April 2011; Label: Downright Music/Ministry of Sound Australia; Format: CD, digital download	45
Photographs	Released: 28 March 2014; Label: EMI Music Australia; Format: CD, digital download	12

=== Singles ===
Single	Year	Peak chart positions		Album
Single	Year	AUS	BEL (Fl)	Album
"For Everyone"	2007	―	―	Non-album singles
"Stomp Yo Shoes" (featuring Tommie Sunshine)	2008	―	―	Non-album singles
"Do You Want More" (featuring Danimal Kingdom)	2009	―	―	Non-album singles
"I Wanna See You"	2010	―	―	Seventeen Past Midnight
"Your Love"	2010	67	―	Seventeen Past Midnight
"Start Again" (featuring Lovers Electric)	2011	―	―	Seventeen Past Midnight
"Drop"	2011	―	―	Seventeen Past Midnight
"Sunrise (Won't Get Lost)" (vs. Tommy Trash)	2012	―	122	Non-album single
"Can't Stop Now" (featuring Kaelyn Behr)	2012	―	―	Photographs
"Comfortable" (featuring Will Heard)	2013	―	―	Photographs
"Tear It Down"	2013	50	―	Photographs
"Back & Forth" (featuring Elizabeth Rose)	2014	―	―	Photographs
"Never Take It Away" (featuring Mayer Hawthorne)	2014	―	―	Photographs
"Don't Let Go" (featuring Max Marshall)	2015	―	―	Non-album singles
"High With You"	2015	―	―	Non-album singles
"Only 1" (featuring Nathaniel S Lewis)	2016	―	―	Non-album singles
"Make a Wrong Thing Right" (featuring Micah Powell)	2016	―	―	Non-album singles
"Penetrate"	2016	―		Non-album singles
"Pass You By"	2017	―	―	Non-album singles
"Birthman" (featuring LO'99)	2017	―	―	Non-album singles
"Alpha Love" (featuring Alex Mills)	2017	―	―	Non-album singles
"Everything I Got"	2018	―	―	Non-album singles
"Stay" (with Fabich featuring Dana Williams)	2019	―	―	Non-album singles
"Now or Never"	2019	―	―	Non-album singles
"Back to Me" (with TCTS featuring Blush'ko)	2019	―	―	Non-album singles
"Care a Little Less"	2019	―	―	Non-album singles
"Clouds"	2021	―	―	Non-album singles
"Enough for You" (featuring Liz Jai)	2021	―	―	Non-album singles
"Bucantini"	2021	―	―	Non-album singles
"―" denotes a release that did not chart.

=== Remixes ===
- Avicii - "Broken Arrows" (The Aston Shuffle Remix)
- Azari & III - "Reckless With Your Love" (The Aston Shuffle Remix) [Modular]
- Bunny Lake – "Into the Future" (The Aston Shuffle Remix) [Klein]
- C-Jay & D-19 featuring Michelle Chirers – "Nether Cutter" (The Aston Shuffle Remix)
- Chris Lake – "Carry Me Away" (The Aston Shuffle Remix) [Nervous]
- Claude VonStroke – "The Whistler" (The Aston Shuffle Remix) [Dirty Bird]
- Datarock – "Amarillion" (The Aston Shuffle Remix) [Nettwerk]
- Dave Robertson – "My Yellow Self" (Knights of The Aston Shuffle Remix)
- Dizzee Rascal featuring Calvin Harris & Chrome – "Dance wiv Me" (The Aston Shuffle Remix) [Ministry of Sound]
- Dom Dolla - "You" (The Aston Shuffle Remix)
- Elliphant featuring Skrillex - "Spoon Me" (The Aston Shuffle Remix)
- Empire of the Sun – "DNA" (The Aston Shuffle Remix) [EMI]
- Fatboy Slim - "Sunset [Bird of Prey]" (The Aston Shuffle Remix)
- Fitz and the Tantrums – "The Walker" (The Aston Shuffle Remix) [Atlantic]
- Full Mental Slackers – "Auto Riot" (The Aston Shuffle Remix)
- Grafton Primary – "All Stars" (The Aston Shuffle Remix)
- Green Velvet – "Shake & Pop" (The Aston Shuffle Remix)
- Grum – "Can't Shake This Feeling" (The Aston Shuffle Remix) [Heartbeats]
- James Harcourt – Gaila Melon (The Aston Shuffle Remix)
- Joe Goddard featuring Valentina - "Gabriel" (The Aston Shuffle Remix) [Greco Roman / DFA]
- Junior Jack - "E-Samba" (The Aston Shuffle Remix)
- Kissy Sell Out – "Garden Friends" (The Aston Shuffle Remix)
- Les Gillettes - "Pompeii" (The Aston Shuffle Remix)
- London Grammar – "Wasting My Young Years" (The Aston Shuffle Remix) [Ministry of Sound]
- Lost Valentinos – "Nightmoves" (The Aston Shuffle Remix) [etcetc]
- Lostep – "Villain" (The Aston Shuffle Remix)
- The Magician (musician) - "SHY" (The Aston Shuffle Remix)
- Malente – "Killer Applikation" (The Aston Shuffle Badonkadonk Remix) [Moonbootique]
- Malente vs. Azzido Da Bass – "They're Killin' It" (The Aston Shuffle Remix) [Dim Mak]
- Maxwell - "All The Ways Love Can Feel" (The Aston Shuffle Remix)
- N.A.S.A featuring Kanye West, Lykke Li & Santigold – "Gifted" (The Aston Shuffle Remix)
- The Nu Coalition – "Born for the Nightlife" (The Aston Shuffle Remix)
- Owl Eyes – "Golden Lies" (The Aston Shuffle Remix)
- Pnau – "Baby" (The Aston Shuffle Just Whoah Remix) [etcetc]
- Pompeii – "Les Gilettes" (The Aston Shuffle Remix) [Kitsuné]
- The Presets – "Goodbye Future" (The Aston Shuffle Remix) [Modular]
- Rhys – "Hot Summer" (The Aston Shuffle Remix)
- Rocket Men – "Candy" (The Aston Shuffle Remix)
- Shena – "Electrosexual" (The Aston Shuffle Remix)
- Sneaky Sound System - "We Love" (The Aston Shuffle Remix) [Modular]
- The Subs – "Don't Stop" (The Aston Shuffle Remix)
- Tensnake featuring Fiora - "Automatic" (The Aston Shuffle Remix) [Armada Music]
- Terry Poison – "24 Hours" (The Aston Shuffle A-Bomb Remix)
- The Knocks featuring St. Lucia - "Modern Hearts" (The Aston Shuffle Remix) [Interscope]
- Tronik Youth – "Disko Suks" (The Aston Shuffle Remix)

=== Remix EPs ===
Title	Details	Tracklist
"Tear It Down" (Remixes)	Released: 2014; Label: Self Released; Formats: Digital download	"Tear It Down" (Extended Mix); "Tear It Down" (Low Steppa Remix); "Tear It Down" (Ivan Gough Remix); "Tear It Down" (Adapt Or Die Remix); "Tear It Down" (SAFIA Remix); "Tear It Down" (Indian Summer Remix)

=== Compilations ===
- Mashed Four (2008, Ministry of Sound) – Disc 2 of 2
- Clubber's Guide to 2009 (2009, Ministry of Sound) – Disc 2 of 3
- The 2010 Annual (2009, Ministry of Sound) – Disc 2 of 3
- Destroy (2010, Ministry of Sound) – Disc 1 of 2
