= Ray Isaac (singer) =

Australian singer and songwriter (born c1990)

- Born: ca. 1990
- Origin: Sydney, Australia
- Genres: Pop; dance-pop
- Years active: 2006—present
- Labels: Ministry of Sound; MyRay; 42ft; EXM; Estillo; Squad Music; Vendetta; Mediadrive; Black Hole; Serial; Audioflap; Ho-Ju; Peace Bisquit; Slaag
- Website: rayisaac.com

Raymond Isaac is an Australian singer and songwriter. He has been a featured artist on the Billboard Dance Charts, Italy Pop Charts, and ARIA Club Tracks. His songs have appeared in films such as Cedar Boys, "Dancin': It's On!", Eating Out: The Open Weekend and Half Share, and television shows such as Famous in 12.

== Career ==
Born in ca. 1996 and raised in Sydney, Isaac was the featured vocalist on Nick Jay's single, "I Don't Give a Damn" (April 2006), which was co-written by Isaac and Jay and peaked at number 11 on the ARIA Club Tracks. It appeared on Sessions Three, a Ministry of Sound compilation album, a label of Universal Music.

In August 2010, "U Want or U Don't", his second single, reached AIR Charts ranking number 7.

His third single, "Who I Am" was released in 2014 and was featured in anti-bullying campaigns in the United States and Indonesia.

In 2015, Isaac co-wrote "Feel the Vibe" performed by Bob Sinclar featuring Dawn Tallman, which peaked at number 1 on the Billboard Dance Charts, number 11 on the Italian Pop charts, and earned a FIMI Gold certification. The song was also featured on NRJ radio and made their Top Hit album for the year. The music video for his song "Hiding" deals with issues of same-sex electroshock conversion therapy and forced marriage. Also that year, he appeared David Winters's dance film Dancin': It's On!.

Isaac tours and performs as a pop DJ, playing pop house remixes with often brooding tribal undertones. Two of his songs, "I Don't Give a Damn" and "Such a Fool", were used in the film Cedar Boys.

== Discography ==
=== Singles and extended plays ===
- "U Want or U Don't" (2010)
- "Catch Me" (2012)
- "Travolta" (2014)
- "Who I Am" (2014)
- "We Stand United" (2017)
- "Hiding" (2018)
- "Mother Mary Song (Ya Oum Allah)" (2018)
- "Prove I Love Ya" (2018)
- "Crazy for You" (2020)

== Filmography ==
- Dancin': It's On! (2015) – Main DJ in Battle Scene

== Awards ==
- Hiding (2015)
  - Best Shorts Competition (2016): Best Music Video
  - Blow-Up Chicago International Arthouse Film Fest (2016): Best Music Film and
  - Blow-Up Chicago International Arthouse Film Fest (2016): Bob Fosse Award
  - California Film Awards (2016): Music Video Competition
  - Depth of Field International Film Festival Competition (2016): Viewer Impact: Entertainment Value
  - Hollywood Film Competition (2016): Best Music Video
