= Lovers Electric =

Australian musical duo

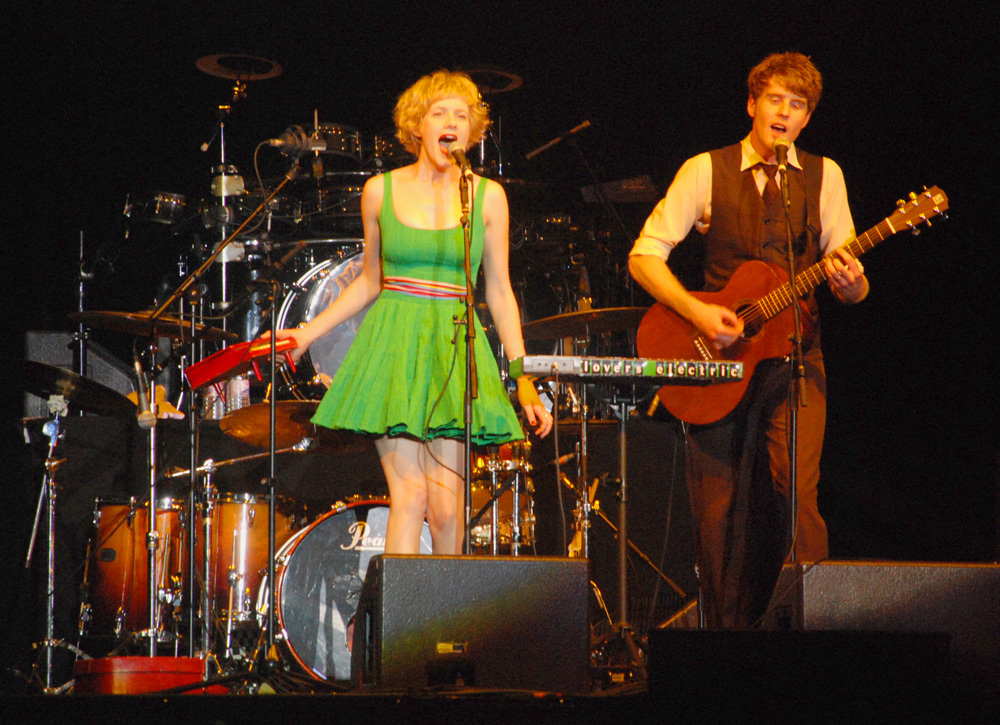
- Performing at the Liverpool Summer Pops, July 2007

Background information
- Origin: Adelaide, South Australia, Australia
- Genres: Pop, electro pop
- Years active: 2005–present
- Labels: Shell, Universal
- Past members: Eden Boucher; David Turley

Lovers Electric are an Australian husband-and-wife pop music duo formed in Adelaide in 2005 by Eden Boucher on lead vocals, toy piano, stylophone and casio synthesiser; and David Turley on guitar, bass guitar, keyboards and vocals.

== History ==
Lovers Electric members Eden Boucher and David Turley both grew up in Adelaide. At 17 they met when Turley was holidaying in the United Kingdom where Boucher was then working. They married two years later and established Lovers Electric in 2005 in Adelaide, the band name is "an ode to their natural chemistry on and off the stage." For most of their career they have been based in Europe, initially in the UK and then in Berlin.

On 4 December 2006 they recorded an electronic, rock album, The Bedroom Demos, using their mobile home studio, while staying in London and in the North of England. For the album Fuzz Townshend supplied drums with Sharon Turley, David's sister, guested on cello for a track and Zanna Evans appeared on harp for another track. MTV used a number of their songs, including "Closer", which was chosen as the theme song in the TV series, The Hills.

At the beginning of 2007, they toured in the United States, playing residencies in New York, Los Angeles and Nashville. A local Nashville website wrote, "Lovers Electric deliver 80s influenced alternative dance pop."

After touring the United States, they toured Europe from May–July 2007 as support for re-formed 1980s band Orchestral Manoeuvres in the Dark (OMD) playing to sold-out venues.

Within a week of this tour finishing, they began recording in Sheffield in the United Kingdom, with producer Eliot Kennedy and finished their debut album "Whatever You Want". They signed with Sony Australia in 2008 and released the album that August. They enjoyed top 10 club chart success with remixes from Sam La More & Luke Chable. Much touring followed, as well as a special appearance on Rove, the popular Australian talk show, in what proved to be a great success for the band.

The band returned to the UK and retreated to the English countryside to record their second album at the 400-year-old Tudor barn studio 'Ridge Farm Studios' just south of London, with producer David Tickle. Together again with Townshend and adding a couple of other musical friends in the mix (Mike Rowe and James Bryan), they recorded the history inspired album 'Impossible Dreams'.

The band currently reside in Berlin, where they released 'Impossible Dreams' with Universal in August 2011. Following on from the success of Whatever You Want, Lovers Electric returned with their second album, 'Impossible Dreams', released in October 2011. Recently released in Germany, the album entered the iTunes Top 10 within 24 hours.

Bearing a more organic sound than their electro-infused debut, 'Impossible Dreams' was a reflection of their life's experiences since they'd first emerged on the Australian music scene three years earlier, a period that saw them continue their traveling lifestyle, at the time in Berlin. The result of eighteen months of writing straight after their first Australian tour, the record was produced in the 400-year-old Ridge Farm Studio in the English countryside – the very studio where groups like Oasis, Whitesnake and Queen laid down tracks – where they worked with producer David Tickle (U2, Split Enz, Prince).

Eden is a designer behind fashion label Eden Honeydew. Lovers Electric are a blend of their Australian roots and European surroundings, visually and musically, influenced by the artists they grew up with as children of the 1980s from Cyndi Lauper to New Order.

Both offspring of parents heavily involved in the arts scene in Adelaide, the couple met on a summer holiday at 17 and married two years later in the UK where Eden had been based for several years. After deciding to pursue music as a couple and founding Lovers Electric – an ode to their chemistry on and off stage – they were offered the chance to tour Europe with reformed group OMD before heading home to Australia in 2008 to release their first album. Whatever You Want rapidly ascended the charts, hitting the iTunes Top 10 while their debut single, Honey hit number 1 on the club charts. The album also caught the attention of MTV who featured several tracks on reality TV juggernaut, The Hills.

The musical style of this group has attracted the attention of several music critics owing to the combination of polished vocal acts with high-energy arrangements.

"Teaming the fragile vocals of Eden Boucher with David Turley's big screen soundscapes, the album is a flashback to the more enduring moments of 1980s, when Tears for Fears, Orchestral Manoervres in the Dark and Gary Numan were directing their electro pocket symphonies at heads rather than hips." Vogue Magazine

"... combined with the couple's good looks and hands-on approach to every aspect of their music, from stage design to video direction, suggests they have an original recipe for pop stardom." Iain Sheddon, The Australian, National Newspaper

"Surprising only to themselves, the laid-back pair has captured an infectious sound on their debut record that certainly radiates with a universal appeal." Rolling Stone Magazine

== Discography ==
- The Bedroom Demos (2006)
- Whatever You Want (2008)
- Impossible Dreams (2011)
- Waiting for Something to Happen (2013)
- Strangers (2015)

The duo describe the album "Impossible Dreams" as being something of a transition from electro-pop to pop, though fans of the 80's inspired tracks on the first album will enjoy the synth-infused In Your Hands and the catchy Without You that challenges the listener to sit still. Taking inspiration from events in their own lives and those around them, the album covers themes of hope and optimism in the face of adversity. The upbeat opening track – and lead single from the album – Beating Like a Drum and the melancholic Be Who We Are, were both inspired by their childhoods in the suburbs of Adelaide, feeling the pressures of conformity and limitation. In contrast are darker themes of coming to terms with loss in Say Goodbye and feeling jaded by events in the world around us in Hearts Are Jaded.

With the hallmarks of epic film soundtracks, though completely contrasting in feel, the powerful Keep the Fire Burning is a reflection on the widespread and long-lasting impact of war, while the impossible catchy Whenever was inspired by the beats and sounds of an old 80s Casio keyboard that David once purchased on a whim. The album includes the first recorded duet from the pair, "Love Can Save Us", and an infectious track penned the day after Michael Jackson's death in response to the media frenzy that ensued, "One in a Million". A critique of the media's change of stance from critics to admirers upon his death, the artists note the message is equally applicable to the turn of events in the wake of Amy Winehouse's recent death.
