= Mark Dynamix =

Australian DJ and record producer

- Also known as: Mark Dynamique, MDX, LL Ebay
- Born: Mark Kenneth Vick; 19 May 1975 (age 50)
- Origin: Sydney, New South Wales, Australia
- Genres: House, techno, synth-pop
- Occupations: DJ, record producer, radio presenter, label manager
- Years active: 1990–present
- Labels: Ministry of Sound Australia, Long Distance Recordings
- Website: www.markdynamix.com

Mark Kenneth Vick (born 19 May 1975), known professionally as Mark Dynamix, is an Australian DJ, record producer, and music industry executive. He is one of Australia's most commercially successful DJs, having sold more than 40 mix compilations with total sales nearing two million units. He is best known for his long-standing association with Ministry of Sound Australia, where he served as the head of the label's recordings for Sony Music Australia from 2017 to 2019.

== Early life and career ==
Vick was born in London and relocated to Sydney as a child. He began his DJ career at the age of 14, hosting a dance music show on Sydney community radio in 1990. By the mid-1990s, he had become a resident DJ at the legendary Sydney nightclub Sublime, which served as a launchpad for his career in the burgeoning Australian rave scene.

== Ministry of Sound years ==
In the early 2000s, Dynamix became a core figure for the Ministry of Sound Australia brand. Alongside John Course, he mixed several editions of The Annual, Sessions, and Clubber's Guide.

- The Annual 2006: Released in late 2005, this compilation became the highest-selling Australian compilation of all time, with physical sales exceeding 350,000 copies.
- Sessions Two: Reached number four on the overall ARIA Albums Chart and number one on both the Compilation and Dance charts.

Dynamix has performed at major international festivals and clubs, including Berlin's Love Parade, Fabric in London, and Mambo in Ibiza. Domestically, he has played the Big Day Out Boiler Room multiple times (2003, 2010, 2013).

== Production and labels ==
In 2008, Dynamix launched his independent record label, Long Distance Recordings, which focused on tech-house and minimal electronic music. The label served as the primary outlet for his Archival series, a multi-volume project that compiled his original productions and remixes from throughout his career.

- The Antipodeans: A synth-pop and nu-disco project formed with producer Danny Muller. In 2022, the duo released a reworking of the Icehouse classic "Hey Little Girl" (The Antipodeans Remix), which reached the Top 10 on the iTunes Dance charts in Australia, the United Kingdom, and Germany.

== Radio and media ==
Dynamix has been a prominent voice on Australian radio for over two decades. He was a regular guest host on Triple J's Mix Up for 15 years and has hosted syndicated shows like Novanext and Electronique. In 2007, he became the first Australian DJ to perform at the MTV Australian Video Music Awards.

== Discography ==
=== Studio albums ===
- Archival: Opening The Vaults (2019)
- Archival: Remixed (2020)
- The Alternative Remixes (2021)

=== Ministry of Sound compilations ===
Mark Dynamix is one of the most prolific contributors to the Ministry of Sound Australia compilation series, having mixed over 30 volumes for the brand.

- The Annual 2002 (with Andy Van) – Platinum-accredited
- The Annual 2003 (with John Course) – Platinum-accredited
- The Annual 2004 – Platinum-accredited
- The Annual 2005 (with John Course) – 2× Platinum-accredited
- The Annual 2006 (with John Course) – 3× Platinum-accredited (Recognized as the highest-selling compilation in Australian history)
- Ministry of Sound: Sessions Two – Gold-accredited
- The Annual: 10 Years (with John Course) (2004)
- Ministry of Sound: 20 Years (with John Course and Tenzin) (2011)

=== Singles ===
- "Identify Me" (with Jaytech) (2006)
- "Destructor" (with Jaytech) (2007)
- "Salt 2.0" (with Namito & JimiJ) (2018)

== Awards and accolades ==
Dynamix's career longevity is marked by consistent rankings in major industry polls and commercial chart success.

- Dance Music Awards (DMA): Nominated for Best DJ Australia (2003).
- InTheMix (ITM50) Poll: Voted the #2 DJ in Australia for multiple consecutive years. In 2005, he was ranked #3 nationally in the same poll.
- 3D World Magazine: Voted the #1 DJ in Australia (2002).
- iTunes Charts: In 2020, the album Archival: Remixed reached #1 on the iTunes Dance Chart in Australia, the Netherlands, and New Zealand.
- ARIA Charts: Several of his mixed compilations, including Sessions Two and The Annual 2006, reached #1 on the ARIA Compilation and Dance charts.
