= TMRW Music =

Record label

- Formerly: Ministry of Sound Australia (1999-2017)
- Type: Private
- Industry: Music; Entertainment
- Founded: 1999; 27 years ago
- Headquarters: Darlinghurst, New South Wales, Australia
- Parent: Ministry of Sound Recordings Ltd (1999-2017)
- Website: Official website

TMRW Music Group is an Australian electronic music record label based in Darlinghurst, New South Wales, Australia. It was founded as Ministry of Sound Australia: a subsidiary of Ministry of Sound Recordings Ltd until 2017 when it was spun off into its own independent company.

In its previous separate incarnation known as Ministry of Sound (UK) Pty Ltd and then Ministry of Sound Australia Pty Ltd, it was Australia's largest dance music label as well as one of Australia's largest independent labels overall, being spun off into a separate independent company with exclusive licence to the Ministry of Sound trademarks in Australia & New Zealand in 2004. In 2016, after the announcement that the Ministry of Sound Group had sold Ministry of Sound Recordings to Sony Music Entertainment UK, Ministry of Sound Australia Managing Director Tim McGee announced that as a result the Australian operations would be forced to rebrand as TMRW Music Group, with all Ministry of Sound recordings-related IP in Australia to be handled by Sony Music Entertainment Australia as of July 2017. TMRW Music Group retains the licence for all Ministry of Sound-branded music events and touring, including operating Ministry of Sound's Australian nightclub based in Sydney on behalf of Ministry of Sound Group.

MoSA also owns Central Station Records, rescuing it from financial collapse in 2009. Ministry of Sound Australia also runs its own sub-labels which have signed many popular artists from Australia and overseas over the years and have been instrumental in helping launch the successful careers of Australian House DJ/Producers e.g. Tommy Trash, Hook N Sling, Stafford Brothers, The Aston Shuffle & Tonite Only.

Every MoSA compilation released since 2001 have held No.1 chart positions on the ARIA compilation, club and dance charts.

From 1999 to 2007, Ministry of Sound Australia CDs were distributed by EMI Music Group Australia. From 2008 onwards Ministry of Sound Australia is distributed by Universal Music Australia.

Notable DJs who have mixed MoSA compilations over the years include Tall Paul, Oski, Hydraulix, Groove Terminator, Mark Dynamix, Hook N Sling, Kid Kenobi, John Course, Axwell, Goodwill, Sean Quinn, DJ Brendon, The Aston Shuffle, MYNC, Steve Aoki, Stafford Brothers, Tommy Trash and The Bloody Beetroots.

On 19 June 2017, MoSA announced that it would rebrand itself as TMRW Music. All future Ministry of Sound compilations will be released through Sony Music, while TMRW will continue to distribute its Hussle, Downright and Astrx sublabels. The company's touring and events businesses, Ministry of Sound Club and other MoS-branded events and tours will not be rebranded.

== History ==
Ministry of Sound's presence has been felt in Australia since 1995 when MDS, a subsidiary of Festival Mushroom Records released Dance Nation. MDS released Parts 2 and 3 in 1996 and 1997 respectively and all were direct copies of the UK releases, as well as Sessions.

Ministry of Sound UK had been doing tours in Australia previous to Ministry of Sound Australia's establishment in late 1999, conducting national tours in 1997 and 1998. Both events coincided with Australian albums Ministry of Sound: Australian Tour '97 and Ministry of Sound: Australian Tour '98 which were sold and released by Festival Mushroom Records. The popularity of these tours and the CDs prompted Ministry of Sound UK to establish itself in Australia in 1999 and released its first compilation, Clubber's Guide to... Australia.

Ministry of Sound Australia was founded in 1999 by Sydney DJ Tim McGee and executives from Ministry of Sound UK, while McGee was an employee of Central Station Records. Ministry of Sound Australia was then known as Ministry of Sound (UK) Pty Ltd and ran the basic operations of the Australian subsidiary as well as Tim McGee's Hussle Recordings which he incorporated into Ministry of Sound (UK) at its founding and began a distribution agreement with EMI.

In 2000, Ministry of Sound Australia produced its first compilation Album: Club Nation 2000, which was mixed by Mark Dynamix and Groove Terminator. Clubber's Guide to... Australia and The Summer Annual - Summer 2000 were produced by Ministry UK for MoSA and mixed by Australian DJs except for Tall Paul. In late 2000, Tim McGee left Central Station to head up Ministry of Sound Australia full-time.

On 2 March 2009, Ministry of Sound Australia announced that it had acquired Central Station Records, Australia's oldest dance label after facing bankruptcy and liquidation due to the 2008 financial crisis. Under this arrangement, Ministry of Sound Australia will have ownership over the label, MoSA's distributor Universal Music Australia will manage artist single and album projects and Central Station Records will handle the compilations, marketing, promotions and tours.

In 2011, Ministry of Sound Australia celebrated 10 years of The Annual in Australia and released "The Annual: 10 Years" which was mixed by John Course and Mark Dynamix.

== Albums ==
Ministry of Sound Australia releases its own compilations and singles, most of which are mixed by prolific DJs from Australia and occasionally overseas although rarely release compilations mixed in-house e.g. Anthems. Ministry of Sound Australia through its labels release albums and singles from international artists e.g. The Bloody Beetroots, Example, Timmy Trumpet, Will Sparks, Chardy, New World Sound, Scndl, Reece Low, Raven & Kreyn, Uberjak'd and Axwell. MoSA has moved away from selling singles physically and prefer to release them via iTunes's Australian store and artists signed to MoSA also have their tracks released via Beatport although albums released by MoSA are still sold physically.

=== Compilation series released by Ministry of Sound Australia ===
- Clubbers Guide to...
- Turn Up Trap
- The Annual
- The Summer Annual
- Anthems
- Clubbers Guide To Breaks
- Sessions
- Chillout Sessions
- Clubbers Guide To Spring
- Progression
- House Sessions
- Best of Blutonium Hardstyle
- Sound of Dubstep
- Kid Kenobi Sessions
- Hard NRG
- Dance Nation
- Club Nation
- Trance Nation
- Housexy
- Mashed
- SessioNZ (New Zealand exclusive)
- Maximum Bass
- Maximum Bass Xtreme
- Electro House Sessions
- Uncovered
- In The Club!
- The Underground
- Running Trax
- Addicted To Bass
- Futurism
- Vicious Cuts (Produced in conjunction with Vicious Recordings)

=== One-off compilations released by Ministry of Sound Australia ===
- Clubber's Guide to... Australia
- Clubber's Guide to... Summer
- 2-Step: The Album
- The Politics of Dancing
- The Chillout Annual 2002
- Late Night Sessions
- Wired
- Mixtape: Mark Dynamix
- Classics
- Discotek
- Chilled 1991-2009
- Destroy
- Tableism
- Stafford Brothers Season 2 Soundtrack

== Clothing ==
Ministry of Sound Australia has its own clothing line which made a return in mid-2014, coinciding with the release of Sessions Eleven.

== Tours ==
Ministry of Sound Australia run national tours every year to coincide with major mix compilations with the first of those being Club Nation 2000. These mostly occur in major nightclubs. Ministry UK ran national tours in Australia in 1997 and 1998 to coincide with Ministry UK & MDS' Australian Tour 1997 and Australian Tour '98 compilations.

== Labels ==
Ministry of Sound Australia own the following labels and also release music as Ministry of Sound Australia:

- Hussle Recordings
- Hussle Black
- Hussle n Bussle
- Poporn
- etcetc
- Deluxe
- Compression
- Hed Kandi Australia
- Downright Music
- Astrx (Formerly Asterix)
- Central Station Records
- Bourne Recordings

MoSA since its establishment in 1999 have also distributed music from its owner's sub-labels:

- Data Records
- Sound of Ministry
- Rulin Records

== See also ==
- List of record labels
