= Sam Sparro discography =

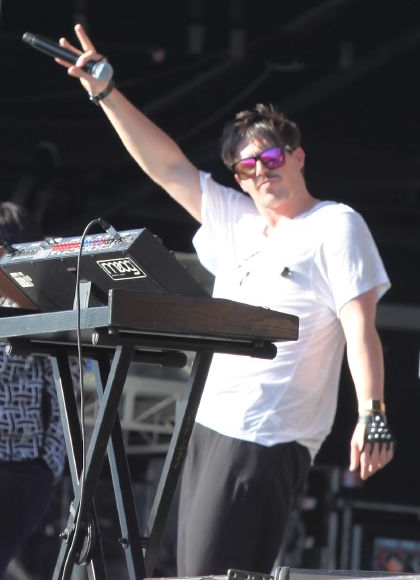
- Sparro performing in 2009
- Studio albums: 3
- Extended plays: 7
- Singles: 21
- Music videos: 17
- Promotional singles: 5
- Mixtapes: 2
- Remixes: 17

Sam Sparro, the Australian-born pop, dance, house, and soul singer-songwriter, record producer, and remix engineer, has released three studio albums. His eponymous debut album, Sam Sparro, released through both Modus Vivendi and Island Records, has been certified Gold. His second album, Return to Paradise was released with EMI. He has released two mixtapes. On 5 August 2013 Sparro released the mixtape Mechanical. to his SoundCloud account to promote his upcoming extended play, Quantum Physical, Vol. 1. Love Made Me Do It was released via his SoundCloud account on 13 February 2015. Sparro has released five extended plays. His first extended play Black + Gold was released by Modus Vivendi Music in January 2007. London Festival '08 was first released on 1 January 2008 with Island Records. Sparro released his third extended play, Pink Cloud, as a free download to promote his then upcoming second album before a number of release push-backs. He released Quantum Physical, Vol. 1 independently on 1 October 2014. On 16 October 2015 Sparro released the second volume of Quantum Physical with Intuit Records.

As a lead artist, Sparro has released ten singles and five Promotional Singles. His most successful single, "Black and Gold", garnered him a Grammy nomination for Best Dance Recording in 2009. The single "Happiness" was certified Platinum in Belgium. The single "21st Century Life" also experienced some commercial success following the release of "Black and Gold" in 2008, and in Belgium his song "Yellow Orange Rays" charted following the release of "Happiness". The single "Pocket" also charted in Australia. Sparro has also been featured on four singles, including songs by Beni, Mason (with DMC), and Plastic Plates; the most notable being "Feelings Gone" from Basement Jaxx's fifth studio album, Scars. On 13 August 2013 he released the single "Hang on 2 Your Love" with Durand Bernarr from his extended play Quantum Physical, Vol. 1. On 31 July 2015 he released the single "Hands Up" from his extended play Quantum Physical, Vol. 2, with a remix single following on 25 September.

Sparro has also made numerous other album appearances through featured vocal performances, remix engineering, songwriting, and production. Sparro has written 3 songs with Adam Lambert that have appeared on Lambert's albums, For Your Entertainment, Glam Nation Live, and Trespassing, and two songs with Courtney Act which appeared on his extended play Kaleidoscope. He has remixed songs for Kimbra, OK Go, Livvi Franc, Sky Ferreira, Miami Horror, Penguin Prison, Lolene, Saint Motel, O'Spada, and Love Grenades. Cameo Lover, the song Sparro remixed for Kimbra, has been featured as a bonus track on her Platinum selling debut album, Vows.

== Albums ==
=== Studio albums ===
Title	Album details	Peak chart positions							Certifications (sales thresholds)
Title	Album details	AUS	AUT	BEL (Fl)	IRE	UK	US Dance	US Heat	Certifications (sales thresholds)
Sam Sparro	Released: 28 April 2008; Label: Island, Modus Vivendi; Formats: CD, digital download	23	59	94	27	4	9	16	UK: Gold
Return to Paradise	Release date: 1 June 2012; Label: EMI; Formats: CD, digital download	41	—	35	—	200	—	—	
Boombox Eternal	Release date: 21 February 2020; Label: Self-released; Formats: Digital download, streaming	—	—	—	—	—	—	—	
"—" denotes that the release did not chart or was not released in that territory.

=== Mixtapes ===
Title	Album details
Mechanical.	Released: 5 August 2013; Label: Self-released; Format: Digital download
Love Made Me Do It	Released: 13 February 2015; Label: Self-released; Format: Digital download

== Extended plays ==
Title	Album details	PCP
Title	Album details	US Jazz
Black + Gold	Released: January 2007; Label: Modus Vivendi; Formats: CD, digital download (Rhapsody exclusive)	—
London Festival '08	Released: 1 January 2008; Label: Island; Format: Digital download	—
Pink Cloud	Released: 24 December 2010; Label: Self-released; Format: Free digital download	—
Quantum Physical, Vol. 1	Released: 1 October 2014; Label: Self-released; Format: Digital download	—
Quantum Physical, Vol. 2	Released: 16 October 2015; Label: Intuit Records, Pulse; Format: Digital download	—
Quantum Physical, Vol. 3: Conspiracy	Released: 19 August 2016; Label: Intuit Records, Pulse; Format: Digital download	—
Christmas in Blue	Released: 17 November 2017; Label: Sparro Inc (self-released); Format: Digital download	25

== Singles ==
=== As lead artist ===
Title	Year	Peak chart positions										Certifications	Album
Title	Year	AUS	AUT	BEL (Fl)	IRE	ITA	DEN	NZ	POL	UK	US Dance	Certifications	Album
"Cottonmouth"	2007	—	—	—	—	—	—	—	—	—	—		Sam Sparro
"Black and Gold"	2008	4	50	15	5	13	10	12	—	2	12	ARIA: Gold; BPI: 2× Platinum	Sam Sparro
"21st Century Life"	2008	42	—	58	—	—	—	—	—	44	—		Sam Sparro
"Pocket"	2008	—	—	—	—	—	—	—	—	—	—		Sam Sparro
"Pink Cloud"	2010	—	—	—	—	—	—	—	—	—	—		Pink Cloud
"Happiness"	2012	—	—	1	—	16	—	—	3	—	—	BEA: Platinum	Return to Paradise
"I Wish I Never Met You"	2012	—	—	—	—	—	—	—	—	—	—		Return to Paradise
"Yellow Orange Rays"	2012	—	—	124	—	—	—	—	—	—	—		Return to Paradise
"Hang on 2 Your Love" (featuring Durand Bernarr)	2013	—	—	—	—	—	—	—	—	—	—		Quantum Physical, Vol. 1
"Hands Up"	2015	—	—	87	—	—	—	—	—	—	—		Quantum Physical, Vol. 2
"Pharma Karma"	2016	—	—	—	—	—	—	—	—	—	—		Quantum Physical, Vol. 3: Conspiracy
"Outside the Blue" (featuring We are King)	2019	—	—	—	—	—	—	—	—	—	—		Boombox Eternal
"Everything"	2019	—	—	—	—	—	—	—	—	—	—		Boombox Eternal
"Eye 2 Eye"	2020	—	—	—	—	—	—	—	—	—	—		Boombox Eternal
"Christmas Time Is Here (Live)"	2020	—	—	—	—	—	—	—	—	—	—		Non-Album Singles
"Like a Ghost" (with Nomi Ruiz)	2021	—	—	—	—	—	—	—	—	—	—		Non-Album Singles
"—" denotes that the release did not chart or was not released in that territory.

=== As a featured artist ===
Title	Year	Peak chart positions			Album
Title	Year	BEL (Fl) Dance	BEL (Wa) Dance	UK	Album
"Feelings Gone" (with Basement Jaxx)	2009	—	—	122	Scars
"Maximus" (with Beni)	2009	16	16	—	Maximus - EP
"Corrected" (with Mason and DMC)	2010	—	—	—	They Are Among Us
"Stay in Love" (with Plastic Plates)	2014	—	—	—	Non-album single
"Bump In The Night" (with Lliam + Latroit)	2016	—	—	—	Non-album single
"Your Man" (with Thanks)	2016	—	—	—	Non-album single
"Back to the Rhythm" (with Luke Million)	2017	—	—	—	Come Together - EP
"Look Ahead (Extended Mix)" (with Honey Dijon & Tim K)	2017	—	—	—	Non-album single
"Stars" (with Miss Honey Dijon)	2018	—	—	—	Non-album single
"The Avenue" (with Sjae)	2019	—	—	—	Non-album single
"Spinning" (with Cakes da Killa and Proper Villians)	2021	—	—	—	Non-album single
"Here Comes The Rain Again" (with Jef Neve)	2023	—	—	—	Non-album single
"—" denotes that the release did not chart or was not released in that territory.

=== Promotional singles ===
Title	Year	Peak chart positions	Album
Title	Year	BEL (Fl)	Album
"Too Many Questions"	2008	—	Sam Sparro
"The Shallow End"	2012	56	Return to Paradise
"—" denotes that the release did not chart or was not released in that territory.

== Other appearances ==
The following have been officially released, but are not featured on a main release by Sparro.

Title	Year	Album	Notes
"Pencilhead" (with DJ Circle)	2006	Groovin' Through Munich - EP	Featured vocalist; Co-written with Fabian Wondrak.; Sparro's first song recorded for commercial distribution.
"Sally" (The Soul Warriors ElectroFunk Remix)	2007	Modus Vivendi Music, Vol. 2	Vocalist; Co-writer; Only official release of this mix was to this Modus Vivendi record label sampler of then upcoming releases. This mix was released a year before the original version of the song first appeared as a track on Sparro's debut album.
"American Boy"	2008	Radio 1's Live Lounge – Volume 3	Vocalist; Writer (of rap section); Live cover; An alternate recording of the song, also recorded in the BBC Radio 1 studios, appears as a B-Side to the single 21st Century Life.; Sparro's cover replaces Kanye West's verse with the rap from "S.A.M.S.P.A.R.R.O".
"Under The Bus" (with Lolene)	2010	The Electrick Hotel	Background vocalist; Co-written with Jesse Rogg and Lolene.
"Black N Gold" (with Wale)	2010	More About Nothing - Mixtape	Featured vocalist; Co-writer of sampled materials.
"Coulda Woulda Shoulda" (with Lyrics Born)	2010	As U Were	Featured vocalist; Co-written with Tom Shimura, Uriah Duffy, Steve Wyreman, Adam Theis, Kat Ouano.
"Breath in" (with Chris Falson (Note: Christopher John Falson, professionally known as Chris Falson, is the father of Sam Sparro.))	2011	Rescue Me	Background vocalist along with Sandra Stephens.
"Shine" (with Chris Falson)	2011	Rescue Me	Background vocalist along with Sandra Stephens.
"The Third of the Storms" (with Mike Simonetti)	2011	Capricorn Rising	Featured vocalist; Co-Written with Mike Simonetti
"Aculpoco" (with Mike Simonetti)	2011	Capricorn Rising	Featured vocalist; Co-Written with Mike Simonetti
"End Is The Beginning" (with The Bottletop Band)	2011	Dream Service	Featured vocalist; Co-written with Hannah Dawson, Rachel Dawson, Wladimir Gasper, Matthew Helders, Drew McConnell, Andy Nicholson, and Matt Parks.
"Your Body" (with Beni)	2011	House of Beni	Featured vocalist; Co-written with Benjamin Single and Nicholas Routledge.
"High Off Your Love" (with Beni)	2011	House of Beni	Featured vocalist; Co-written with Benjamin Single, Nicholas Routledge, and Kim Moyes.
"Shady" (with Adam Lambert and Nile Rodgers)	2012	Trespassing	Featured vocalist; Co-writer
"Coulda Woulda Shoulda" (Party Ben Remix) (with Lyrics Born)	2012	As U Were (Remixes)	Featured vocalist; Co-writer.
"Coulda Woulda Shoulda" (Mocean Worker Remix) (with Lyrics Born)	2012	As U Were (Remixes)	Featured vocalist; Co-writer.
"When They Say They Want Our America Back, What the Fuck Do They Mean?" (with Jill Sobule)	2013	Junior Executive	Background vocalist
"Glow in the Dark" (with The Bloody Beetroots)	2013	Hide	Featured vocalist; Co-written with Simone Cogo.; Alternate version of the song was recorded with Theophilus London.
"Out of My Mind" (with Droid Bishop (Note: James Bowen Falson, professionally known as Droid Bishop, is the brother of Sam Sparro.))	2014	Beyond the Blue	Featured vocalist; Co-written with Droid Bishop.; Song was used to promote Beyond The Blue.
"If I Can't Have You" (with Kylie Minogue)	2015	Kylie + Garibay	Featured vocalist; Co-written with Fernando Garibay and Brian Dong Ho Lee.
"Touch Back" (with Fare Soldi)	2016	21+	Featured vocalist; Co-written with Fare Soldi.
"My Soul is Rising" (with Chris Falson and Rhythm Gospel & Blues)	2016	You Got Wings	Background vocalist along with Linda McCrary, Anjolee Williams, Vonciele Faggett, David Raven, and Sandra Stephens.
"Glow of Love" (with Paul Harris)	2016	Non-album single	Uncredited vocalist; Co-written with Steve Daly, Simon Anthony Duffy, and Wayland Paul Harris.
"Losing Sleep" (with Star Slinger)	2016	We Could Be More – EP	Featured vocalist; Co-written with Darren Williams.
"Like A Drug" (with Tough Love)	2017	Non-album single	Uncredited vocalist; Co-written with Jay Clarke, Stefan Joseph O'Brien, and Alexander Unwin.
"Caterpillar" (with Jef Neve)	2017	Spirit Control	Featured vocalist; Co-written with Jef Neve.
"Last Forever" (with Oliver)	2017	Full Circle	Featured vocalist; Co-written with Vaughn Oliver and Oliver Goldstein.
"Look Ahead" (with Honey Dijon & Tim K)	2017	The Best of Both Worlds	Featured vocalist; An extended mix of this song was released as a single.
"Sticky Situations" (with Alice Ivy)	2024	Do What Majes You Happy	Featured vocalist; Co-written with Annika Schmarsel.
Unless otherwise specified, song credits are adapted from the liner notes of the albums from which songs originally appear.

=== Special releases ===
Title	Year	Notes
"Soles of Fire"	2009	Released as a member of "Chauffeur", a short lived musical group consisting of singer Sam Sparro, rapper Theophilus London, & producer Mark Ronson. Both singles were released exclusively to limited edition vinyl pressings only available with the purchase of Mark Ronson and Gucci's shoe collaboration.
"Glamorous Life"	2009	Released as a member of "Chauffeur", a short lived musical group consisting of singer Sam Sparro, rapper Theophilus London, & producer Mark Ronson. Both singles were released exclusively to limited edition vinyl pressings only available with the purchase of Mark Ronson and Gucci's shoe collaboration.
"Ninja" (with Ricki-Lee)	2012	Sparro and Ricki-Lee co-wrote the song together. They creating it by communicating through the Samsung Galaxy Note II. The song was used to promote the Note II at its launch event in Sydney Australia on 14 November 2012.
"Get Lucky"	2013	Cover of song by Daft Punk and Pharrell Williams, the song was released to Sparro's SoundCloud and YouTube accounts.
"Spread a Little Love"	2013	Originally written and produced by Sparro for Lexus's December to Remember 2013 ad campaign, it was released by the company in a promotional music video and for free download on Sparro's SoundCloud account.
"Rock the Boat"	2015	Cover of the song by Aaliyah, the song was released to Sparro's SoundCloud account on 2 January 2015.
"Night Games"	2015	Song performed and written with Steed Lord, the song was exclusively released by BlackBook on 17 November 2015.

== Remixes ==
Title	Year	Artist	Album(s)	Notes
"Young Lovers" (Sam Sparro Edit)	2007	Love Grenades	Modus Vivendi Music, Vol. 2	Remixed by Sam Sparro and Jesse Rogg
"Young Lovers" (Sam Sparro Edit)	2008	Love Grenades	Tigers in the Fire - EP	Remixed by Sam Sparro and Jesse Rogg
"Now I'm That Bitch" (Sam Sparro Remix) [Explicit]	2009	Livvi Franc	Now I'm That Bitch (Remixes) - EP	Remixed by Sam Sparro and Jesse Rogg; Original mix featured Pitbull
"Now I'm That Chick" (Sam Sparro Remix) [Edited]	2009	Livvi Franc	Now I'm That Bitch (Remixes) - EP	Remixed by Sam Sparro and Jesse Rogg; Original mix featured Pitbull
"Now I'm That Bitch" (Sam Sparro & Golden Extended Mix) [Explicit]	2009	Livvi Franc	Special SoundCloud Release	Remixed by Sam Sparro and Jesse Rogg; Original mix featured Pitbull
"Feelings Gone" (Sam Sparro Remix)	2009	Basement Jaxx (featuring Sam Sparro)	Feelings Gone – Digital Single	Remixed by Sam Sparro
"Sexy People" (Sam Sparro & Golden's Starlight Mix)	2009	Lolene	Sexy People	Remixed by Sam Sparro and Jesse Rogg
"Sexy People" (Sam Sparro & Golden's Starlight Dub)	2009	Lolene	Sexy People	Remixed by Sam Sparro and Jesse Rogg
"Sexy People" (Sam Sparro & Golden's Starlight Radio Edit)	2009	Lolene	Sexy People	Remixed by Sam Sparro and Jesse Rogg
"Walking On A Line" (Sam Sparro Remix)	2009	Pony Pony Run Run	—N/a	Remixed by Sam Sparro
"Pay Off" (Sam Sparro & Golden WERQ remix)	2010	O'Spada	Digital Single	Remixed by Sam Sparro and Jesse Rogg
"Dear Dictator" (Sam Sparro Remix)	2010	Saint Motel	—N/a	Remixed by Sam Sparro
"Obsession" (Sam Sparro & Golden Touch Club Mix)	2010	Sky Ferreira	Obsession (The Remixes) - US Promo EP	Remixed by Sam Sparro and Jesse Rogg; Background vocals by Sam Sparro
"Obsession" (Sam Sparro & Golden Touch Dub)	2010	Sky Ferreira	Obsession (The Remixes) - US Promo EP	Remixed by Sam Sparro and Jesse Rogg; Background vocals by Sam Sparro
"Obsession" (Sam Sparro & Golden Touch Radio Mix)	2010	Sky Ferreira	Obsession (The Remixes) - US Promo EP	Remixed by Sam Sparro and Jesse Rogg; Background vocals by Sam Sparro
"White Knuckles" (Sam Sparro Remix)	2010	OK Go	White Knuckles - EP	Remixed by Sam Sparro
"Holidays" (Sam Sparro and Golden Touch Remix) (featuring Alan Palomo)	2010	Miami Horror	Holidays - EP	Remixed by Sam Sparro and Jesse Rogg
"Golden Train" (Sam Sparro Remix)	2011	Penguin Prison	Golden Train	Remixed by Sam Sparro
"Cameo Lover" (Sam Sparro & Golden Touch Remix)	2011	Kimbra	Vows (iTunes Deluxe Version)	Remixed by Sam Sparro and Jesse Rogg; Background vocals by Sam Sparro
"Cameo Lover" (Sam Sparro & Golden Touch Remix)	2011	Kimbra	Settle Down - EP	Remixed by Sam Sparro and Jesse Rogg; Background vocals by Sam Sparro
"Burn It Down" (Sam Sparro Remix)	2012	Ricki-Lee	—N/a	Remixed by Sam Sparro
"To Dust" (Sam Sparro Remix)	2013	Alice Russell	To Dust/I Loved You – Single	Remixed by Sam Sparro
"Hair & Makeup" (Sam Sparro Gorgeous Mix)	2014	Trinidad Senolia	Postcards From Strangers Remixes – EP	Remixed by Sam Sparro; Background vocals by Sam Sparro

== Writing and production credits ==
=== Music ===
The following have been written and/or produced by Sparro for other artists.

Title	Year	Album	Notes
"VooDoo" (Adam Lambert)	2009	For Your Entertainment	Co-writer
"VooDoo" (Adam Lambert)	2011	Glam Nation Live	Co-writer
"Everybody Loves You When You Are Dead" (Nikka Costa)	2011	Pro Whoa – promo	Background vocalist; Co-written with Nikka Costa, Keefus Ciancia, and Daniel Luttrell.
"Broken English" (Adam Lambert)	2012	Trespassing	Co-writer
"Kaleidoscope" (Courtney Act)	2015	Kaleidoscope – EP	Producer; Co-written with Courtney Act.
"Body Parts" (Courtney Act)	2015	Kaleidoscope – EP	Producer; Co-written with Courtney Act and Jake Shears
"Automatic" (Zhu featuring AlunaGeorge)	2015	Genesis Series	Co-written with Aluna Francis and George Reid.
"Lick My Lips" (Katharine McPhee)	2015	Hysteria	Co-written with Isabella Summers, Marcus Miller, and Luther Vandross
"Shadows" (Kim Anh)	2015	Non-album single	Background vocalist; Co-produced with Kim Anh
"Face to Face" (Little Boots)	2016	Afterhours – EP	Co-written with Little Boots.
"Let Me Down Slowly" (Tinashe)	2021	333	Co-written with Tinashe Kachingwe.
"Your Name" (Shea Couleé)	2022	8	Producer; Co-written with Shea Couleé and Eddie Gessford.
"Like a Ghost" (Nomi Ruiz)	To Be Announced		Co-written with Nomi Ruiz.
Song credits adapted from the liner notes of the albums from which they appear unless otherwise noted.

==== Unpublished ====
The following are songs that have been written and/or produced by Sparro but remain unpublished.

Label	Song	Co-Writer(s)	Ref.
Soul69	"Fork In Road" / "Can't Be"	None	(Note: Song credits adapted from the repertoire of BMI. All songs licensed under > Songwriter/Composer > "Falson, Samuel F" and/or "Falson, Samuel Frankland".)
Soul69	"He's Just Not That Into You" / "Something's Queer"	None	
Soul69	"Love Is What We Need" / "Wait"	None	
Soul69	"Ooh"	None	
Soul69	"Sing" / "I'm Gonna Sing"	None	
Soul69	"What In The World" / "How It Used To Be"	None	
EMI	"Break the Law"	None	
EMI	"Devil Distracted Me"	Falson, James Bowan	
EMI	"Easy"	None	
EMI	"I'm Not OK"	DeStefano, Chris	
EMI	"I'm Not OK"	Stevens, Shane	
EMI	"Misguided"	None	
EMI	"Monster"	None	
EMI	"That Was Really Fun"	None	
EMI	"Use Your Imagination"	None	
EMI	"We Love It"	Kurstin, Greg	
EMI	"Where Do We Go"	None	
unknown	"Last Night" (with Róisín Murphy)	unknown	
Pulse	"On The Side"	Cunningham, Ruth-Anne	
Pulse	"Take Love"	Cunningham, Ruth-Anne	

=== Television and film ===
The following are original compositions written and/or produced by Sparro for use in television and film.

Title	Notes
"Bargain Hunt-BG Cues"	Background cues written/produced by Sparro and Jesse Rogg for the BBC program Bargain Hunt.
"Daily 10-BG Cues"	Background cues written/produced by Sparro for the E! program Daily 10.
"Got To Dance-BG Cues"	Background cues written/produced by Sparro and Jesse Rogg for the Sky One program Got To Dance.
"Style Star-BG Cues"	Background cues written/produced by Sparro for the Style Network program Style Star.

== Music videos ==
Title	Year	Director(s)
"Cottonmouth"	2007	Mariah Garnett
"Black and Gold" (version one)	2008	Mariah Garnett
"Black and Gold" (version two)	2008	AlexandLiane
"21st Century Life"	2008	Mariah Garnett
"Pink Cloud"	2010	Franc Fernandez
"The Shallow End"	2012	Unknown
"Happiness"	2012	Mike Rosenthal
"I Wish I Never Met You"	2012	Mike Rosenthal
"Hang On 2 Your Love"	2014	Unknown
"Spread a Little Love"	2020	Unknown

=== As featured artist ===
Title	Year	Director(s)
"Young Lovers" (Sam Sparro Edit) (with Love Grenades)	2008	Unknown
"Feelings Gone" (with Basement Jaxx)	2008	Andy Soup
"Maximus" (with Beni)	2009	Rhett and Warran
"Dear Dictator (Sam Sparro Remix)" (with Saint Motel)	2010	Saint Motel
"Coulda Woulda Shoulda" (with Lyrics Born)	2010	Yoram Benz
"The Third of the Storms" (with Mike Simonetti)	2010	Mike Simonetti & Generato
"Stay In Love" (with Plastic Plates)	2014	Unknown

=== Other music video appearances ===
Title	Year	Director(s)
"Young Lovers" (Love Grenades)	2008	Steve Lee
