= Yellow Orange Rays =

Single by Sam Sparro

from the album Return to Paradise
- Released: 9 November 2012
- Recorded: 2011–2012
- Genre: Pop; disco; dance-pop; soul
- Length: 3:06
- Label: EMI
- Songwriters: Tim Anderson; Sam Falson; Bethany Cosentino
- Producer: Tim Anderson

Sam Sparro singles chronology
"I Wish I Never Met You" (2012)	"Yellow Orange Rays" (2012)	"Hang on 2 Your Love" (2013)

"Yellow Orange Rays" is a song by Australian-born singer-songwriter, record producer, and remix engineer Sam Sparro. The song was released as a b-sided digital single on 9 November 2012 to Dutch iTunes. It is the third single from his sophomore studio album Return to Paradise, within the country of Belgium.

The single entered the Belgian Ultratop Chart on 29 December at No. 92, enviably peaking at No. 74, it managing to stay on the chart for four consecutive weeks. Two weeks earlier in the country, on the week of 15 December, the single entered the Dance Bubbling Under Chart at #4; on this chart "Yellow Orange Rays" peaked at No. 2 and maintained this chart position for three consecutive weeks, managing to stay on the charts for six consecutive weeks in all, the last three weeks of December 2012 and first three weeks of January 2013.

== Background ==
Jesse Rogg, who is a close friend of Sparro's is usually the main producer on his works, but was only involved in the post production of "Yellow Orange Rays". Tim Anderson produced the track, also writing it with Sparro. Bethany Cosentino of Best Coast sings backing vocals for "Yellow Orange Rays" as well as contributing to the song as a writer. Piano in the song is by Charlie Willcocks, who has worked with Sparro before on the songs "Still Hungry" from his debut album, Sam Sparro, and appears not only as a pianist on the song "Happieness", but a writer.

== Track list ==
Digital download – single
No.	Title	Length
1.	"Yellow Orange Rays"	3:24
2.	"Yellow Orange Rays" (Bodyspasm Remix)	3:56

== Personnel ==
Credits adapted from the liner notes of Return to Paradise.

- Tim Anderson – writing
- Bethany Cosentino – writing
- John Fields – mixing
- Jesse Rogg – post production
- Ryan Shields – percussion
- Sam Sparro – vocals, writing, synths, additional piano
- Charlie Willcocks – piano

== Chart performance ==
=== Weekly charts ===
Chart (2012)	Position
Belgium (Ultratop 50 Flanders)	92
Belgium (Ultratop Dance Bubbling Under Flanders)	2
Chart (2013)	Position
Belgium (Ultratop 50 Flanders)	74
Belgium (Ultratop Dance Bubbling Under Flanders)	2
