= Beni (Australian musician) =

- Also known as: beNi
- Born: Benjamin Single
- Origin: Sydney
- Genres: Electronica
- Occupations: Musician; DJ; Producer; Remix engineer
- Years active: 2006–present
- Labels: Kitsuné; Modular
- Website: Tumblr; Twitter; Facebook; Myspace; SoundCloud; YouTube

Benjamin Nicholas Single, known professionally as Beni, is an Australian musician, DJ, producer, and remix engineer. Beni formed one half of the Riot in Belgium duo with Joel Dickson. Beni has released music through the French Kitsuné and the Australian Modular Recordings.

== Career ==
=== Solo career ===
==== My Love Sees You ====
Beni released his first single "My Love Sees You" on 19 January 2008, through Kitsuné. The song features extra production work by Sam Littlemore, marking the first of two collaborations between the two. The song stayed on both the Flemish and Walloon Ultratop Dance Chart in Belgium for five weeks, peaking at the chart position of nine. The track was later featured on Kitsuné Maison Compilation 6. An official remix from the maxi single was produced by Etienne de Crécy, named, "My Love Sees You" (Coco Walsh Etienne de Crécy Mix), it is the first of two times the musicians will work together.

==== Maximus ====
The following year, 2009, a shortened version of the track "Fringe Element" was featured on Kitsuné Maison Compilation 7 named "Fringe Element" (Short Like Me Edit). On 4 August 2009 Beni released his extended play Maximus featuring the new, full length, version of "Fringe Element", and the title track "Maximus" as well as an alternate mix named "Maximus" (White). The Title track was released as Beni's second single, featuring vocals by Sam Sparro, marking the first of four collaborations between the two. The remix EP for "Maximus" was released on 24 August 2009. In Belgium the single peaked at 16 on the Ultratop Dance Chart, remaining on the chart for two weeks. Additionally, the Harvard Bass Remix of "Maximus" was featured on the Kitsuné Maison Compilation 8.

==== House of Beni ====
House of Beni was released on 23 September 2011, with Modular Recordings. In Australia, Beni's home country, on 21 November 2011, the album entered the iTunes albums chart at No. 47, inevitably peaking at No. 24 on 27 November 2011, staying on the chart for 15 days. The album failed to chat on the ARIA Top 50 Digital Albums Chart or any Hung Medien charts. However, corresponding with the album's chart movement on iTunes, "Someone Just Like You" (featuring Mattie Safer), the album's second single, released as of 21 October 2011, entered the ARIA Top 50 Club Tracks Chart at No. 44 the week commencing 10 October 2011. The song went on to peak at No. 30, on 14 November 2011, after 6 weeks on the chart. The song stayed on the chart for an additional four weeks, a total of 10 weeks, dropping of the chart on 19 December 2011, the week before charting No. 44.

House of Beni's lead single, "It's a Bubble", was released on 31 July 2011, with vocals by Sean DeLear, and production by Turbotito of Poolside. On 22 April 2012 the last single from the album, "Last Night", was released. It features vocals by Prince Terrence and extra production by Etienne de Crécy, the second time that de Crécy & Beni have worked together. The first track off the album, "Sway", features vocals from singer-songwriter Nomi Ruiz. The album also features Sam Sparro on the tracks "Your Body" and "High Off Your Love" as vocalist and lyric writer, being the pairs second and third collaborations. The song "Love Scene" was produced in joint with Sam Littlemore, this being the second time they worked together. The final track from House of Beni is "Zig Zags", featuring vocals by Via Tania. The album also includes the songs "O.P.U.L.E.N.C.E" and "Yeah".

==== Remixes by Beni ====
Beni has engineered remixes for Flight Facilities, Kimbra, LaRoux, Sam Sparro, Sneaky Sound System, and The Temper Trap. Most notable is his remix for LaRoux. Beni engineered "Quicksand" (Beni's Sinking at 1.56 Mix) in 2008, which appeared on half of the song's physical and digital single releases, including 12" and CD releases. Also notable is Beni's remix for Sam Sparro, "Happiness" (Beni Remix), as it marks their fourth time having worked together.

=== Riot in Belgium ===
Riot in Belgium was a duo of Beni and Joel Dickson. They've made several remixes of artist such as Chromeo and Yelle. Their remix of Yelle's song À cause des garçons was featured as soundtrack to the videogame Need for Speed: ProStreet in late 2007.

== Discography ==
=== Studio albums ===
Title	Album details
House of Beni	Released: 23 September 2011; Label: Modular; Formats: 12", CD, digital download

House of Beni
No.	Title	Length
1.	"Sway" (featuring Nomi Ruiz)	3:38
2.	"Last Night" (featuring Prince Terrence of HeartsRevolution)	3:22
3.	"Your Body" (featuring Sam Sparro)	3:56
4.	"It's a Bubble" (featuring Sean deLear & Turbotito of Poolside)	4:39
5.	"Someone Just Like You" (featuring Mattie Safer formerly of The Rapture)	3:33
6.	"High Off Your Love" (featuring Sam Sparro)	4:45
7.	"O.P.U.L.E.N.C.E"	4:03
8.	"Love Scene" (featuring production by Sam Littlemore)	2:49
9.	"Yeah"	6:42
10.	"Zig Zags" (featuring Via Tania)	3:04

=== Extended plays and singles ===
Title	Album details	Tracklist
My Love Sees You – Remixes	Released: 19 January 2008; Label: Kitsuné; Formats: 12", digital download	My Love Sees You; My Love Sees You (In Flagranti Remix); My Love Sees You (Etienne De Crecy Coco Walsh's Remix); My Love Sees You (Dub Mix)
Maximus – EP	Released: 4 August 2009; Label: Kitsuné; Formats: 12", CD, digital download	Maximus; Maximus (White Version); Fringe Element
Maximus – Remixes	Released: 24 August 2009; Label: Kitsuné; Formats: CD, digital download	Maximus ft. Sam Sparro (Radio Edit); Maximus ft. Sam Sparro; Maximus ft. Sam Sparro (White Version); Maximus ft. Sam Sparro (Jori Hulkkonen Remix); Maximus ft. Sam Sparro (Andre & Ooh Ee Pink Version); Maximus ft. Sam Sparro (Harvard Bass Remix)
It's A Bubble – Remixes	Released: 31 July 2011; Label: Modular; Formats: 12", digital download	It's A Bubble ft. Sean deLear & Turbotito (Original Version); It's A Bubble ft. Sean deLear & Turbotito (DJ Sneak Remix)); It's A Bubble ft. Sean deLear & Turbotito (The Magician Remix)); It's A Bubble ft. Sean deLear & Turbotito (Dimitri From Paris Erodiscotheque Remix))
Someone Just Like You – Remixes	Released: 21 October 2011; Label: Modular; Formats: CD, digital download	Someone Just Like You ft. Mattie Safer; Someone Just Like You ft. Mattie Safer (Villa Remix); Someone Just Like You ft. Mattie Safer (Djedjotronic Remix); Someone Just Like You ft. Mattie Safer (Wax Motif Remix); Someone Just Like You ft. Mattie Safer (Style of Eye Remix)
Last Night – Remixes	Released: 22 April 2012; Label: Modular; Formats: digital download	Last Night ft. Prince Terrence (Brodinski Remix); Last Night ft. Prince Terrence (Oliver $ Remix); Last Night ft. Prince Terrence (Oliver $ Dub Remix); Last Night ft. Prince Terrence (Waifs & Strays Synthetic Remix)
Protect ft. Antony & Cleopatra – Remixes	Released: 2014; Label: Modular; Formats: digital download	Protect ft. Antony & Cleopatra; Can't Hide; Protect ft. Antony & Cleopatra (Indian Summer Remix); Protect ft. Antony & Cleopatra (Beni vs Wordlife Remix)

My Love Sees You – Remixes
No.	Title	Length
1.	"My Love Sees You" (featuring production by Sam Littlemore)	5:54
2.	"My Love Sees You" (In Flagranti Remix)	6:19
3.	"My Love Sees You" (Coco Walsh Etienne de Crécy Mix)	6:02
4.	"My Love Sees You" (Beni's Dub) (Australia/New Zealand)	6:17
5.	"My Love Sees You" (CLASSIXX Remix) (Beatport Exclusive Bonus Track)	4:12
6.	"My Love Sees You" (DerDieDas Remix) (Beatport Exclusive Bonus Track)	4:15

Maximus – EP (featuring Sam Sparro)
No.	Title	Length
1.	"Maximus"	4:09
2.	"Maximus" (White)	5:25
3.	"Fringe Element^{[a]}"	5:24

Maximus – Remixes (featuring Sam Sparro)
No.	Title	Length
1.	"Maximus" (Jori Hulkkonen Remix)	6:22
2.	"Maximus" (Andy & Ooh Ee Pink Version)	5:30
3.	"Maximus" (Harvard Bass Remix)	5:33
4.	"Maximus" (Señor Stereo Remix)	4:27
5.	"Fringe Element" (Alex Gopher Remix^{[a]})	4:52

It's A Bubble – Remixes (featuring Sean deLear & Turbotito)
No.	Title	Length
1.	"It's A Bubble"	4:41
2.	"It's A Bubble" (DJ Sneak Remix)	8:26
3.	"It's A Bubble" (The Magician Remix)	4:38
4.	"It's A Bubble" (Dimitri from Paris Erosdiscotique Remix)	6:04
5.	"It's A Bubble" (Round Table Knights Remix) (Beatport Exclusive Bonus Track)	7:18

Someone Just Like You – Remixes (featuring Mattie Safer)
No.	Title	Length
1.	"Someone Just Like You"	3:37
2.	"Someone Just Like You" (Villa Remix)	5:33
3.	"Someone Just Like You" (Djedjotronic Remix)	6:03
4.	"Someone Just Like You" (Wax Motif Remix)	4:50
5.	"Someone Just Like You" (Style of Eye Remix)	5:48

Last Night – Remixes (featuring Prince Terrence)
No.	Title	Length
1.	"Last Night"	3:23
2.	"Last Night" (Brodinski Remix Remix)	4:07
3.	"Last Night" (Oliver $ Remix^{[b]})	6:17
4.	"Last Night" (Oliver $ Dub Remix^{[b]})	6:17
5.	"Last Night" (Waifs & Strays Synthetic Remix^{[b]})	6:37

Notes

- ^{^a} Track does not feature Sparro.
- ^{^b} Mix does not feature Prince Terrence.

=== Charted songs ===
Title	Year	Peak chart positions			Album
Title	Year	AUS Club Play	BEL (Vl) Dance	BEL (Wa) Dance	Album
"Someone Just Like You"	2008	–	9	9	Non-album single
"Maximus" (featuring Sam Sparro)	2009	–	16	16	Maximus – EP
"Someone Just Like You" (featuring Mattie Safer )	2011	30	–	–	House of Beni
"—" denotes items which were not released in that country or failed to chart.

=== Remixes ===
Year	Title	Artist	Appearance(s)	Notes/Label(s)
2008	"Quicksand" (Beni's Sinking at 1.56 Mix)	La Roux	Quicksand – Single	Polydor, Kitsuné
2008	"Quicksand" (Beni's Sinking at 1.56 Mix)	La Roux	In for the Kill (French EP)	Polydor, Kitsuné
2011	"Foreign Language" (Beni Remix)	Flight Facilities	Flight Facilities Remixes	Future Classic
2012	"Two Way Street" (Beni Remix)	Kimbra	N/A	Song was officially remixed but never released as no remix or maxi singles were ever released for "Two Way Street", because of this the remix was released to Beni's SoundCloud.
2012	"Trembling Hands" (Beni Remix)	The Temper Trap	Trembling Hands (Remix EP)	Liberation
2012	"Friends" (Beni Remix)	Sneaky Sound System	Friends (Remixes)	Modular
2012	"Happiness" (Beni Remix)	Sam Sparro	Happiness – Remixes	Fourth collaboration with Sparro. EMI

=== Appears on ===
- Kitsuné Maison Compilation 6 (2008 Kitsuné France)
- Kitsuné Maison Compilation 7 (2009 Kitsuné France)
- Kitsuné Maison Compilation 8 (2009 Kitsuné France)
