= Quicksand (La Roux song) =

- EP cover

Single by La Roux

from the album La Roux
- Released: 15 December 2008
- Recorded: 2008
- Studio: Elfin (Teddington, London)
- Genre: Synth-pop
- Length: 3:05
- Label: Polydor
- Songwriters: Elly Jackson; Ben Langmaid
- Producers: Ben Langmaid; Elly Jackson

La Roux singles chronology
"Quicksand" (2008)	"In for the Kill" (2009)

Alternative cover
- Re-release cover

Music video
- "Quicksand" on YouTube

"Quicksand" is a song by English synth-pop duo La Roux, released on 15 December 2008 by Kitsuné as both their debut single and the lead single from their eponymous debut studio album (2009). Written and produced by members Elly Jackson and Ben Langmaid, the track was a commercial disappointment despite acclaim from critics, peaking at number 153 on the UK Singles Chart upon limited release. When re-released on 23 November 2009, the single re-entered the chart at number 129.

== Song information ==
Jackson told The London Paper that the song is about "having an intense moment with someone, when maybe you're watching a film or listening to music, and both of you are yearning for the other one, and it's almost painful to sit next to them."

== Critical reception ==
"Quicksand" was met with critical acclaim. Digital Spy music editor Nick Levine wrote that "[l]ike most of the songs on their debut album, it's a winning combination of pop smarts, stifling romantic obsession and production that mixes the sounds of '82 with the sonic punch of '09." Alexis Petridis of The Guardian commented that "the sparse dynamics and stabbing synthesisers of 'Quicksand' offer a reminder that not every aspect of the 80s has been mined to exhaustion in recent years." Peter Paphides of The Times called the song "superb" and added, "Propelled along by a melody that shares some of its DNA with Prince's 'When Doves Cry', Jackson casts herself as the recipient of an overture from someone already in a relationship."

John Murphy, writing for musicOMH, described the song as "instantly addictive and catchy", while stating that "unlike a lot of electro acts out there, 'Quicksand' has real heart and emotion to it as well—certainly not a case of style over substance." AllMusic's Heather Phares noted that the track "uses a relentlessly tight arrangement and Jackson's frosty soulfulness to give the song's obsession a shot of excitement." Luke Turner of NME referred to "Quicksand" as "liquid-mercury-smooth but pierced by sharp vocals."

== Music video ==
The music video of "Quicksand" was directed by Kinga Burza. It was released on YouTube on 13 January 2009. The video shows Jackson on a tropical island with pineapples and the sun setting. Girls are dancing. Jackson is seen with a parrot on her shoulder, singing. It mostly features Jackson singing with the sun setting behind her.

== Track listings ==
=== Original release ===
- French 12-inch single

A1. "Quicksand" (Original) – 3:07
A2. "Quicksand" (autoKratz Drags to Riches Mix) – 4:44
B1. "Quicksand" (Beni's Sinking at 1.56 Mix) – 4:20
B2. "Quicksand" (Chateau Marmont Remix) – 3:34

- French digital EP
1. "Quicksand" – 3:07
2. "Quicksand" (AutoKratz Drags to Riches Mix) – 4:42
3. "Quicksand" (Beni's Sinking at 1.56 Mix) – 4:18
4. "Quicksand" (Chateau Marmont Remix) – 3:32
5. "Quicksand" (Joe and Will Ask? Remix) – 5:01
- UK digital single
1. "Quicksand" (Standard Version) – 3:05
- US EP and digital EP
1. "Quicksand" (Original Version) – 3:06
2. "Quicksand" (Mad Decent Remix No. 1) – 5:07
3. "In for the Kill" (Skream's Let's Get Ravey Remix) – 5:02
- US 12-inch single

A1. "Quicksand" – 3:08
A2. "Quicksand" (Mad Decent Mix No. 1) – 5:10
A3. "Quicksand" (Instrumental) – 3:08
B1. "In for the Kill" (Skream's Let's Get Ravey Remix) – 5:04
B2. "In for the Kill" (Instrumental) – 4:08

=== Re-release ===
- UK CD single
1. "Quicksand" – 3:07
2. "Quicksand" (Boy 8 Bit Remix) – 5:58
3. "Quicksand" (Beni's Sinking at 1.56 Mix) – 4:19
- UK limited-edition 7-inch single

A. "Quicksand" - 3:07

- UK digital EP
1. "Quicksand" – 3:07
2. "Quicksand" (Boy 8 Bit Remix) – 5:58
3. "Quicksand" (Alex Metric Remix) – 6:26
4. "Quicksand" (Mad Decent Remix No. 1) – 5:12

== Credits and personnel ==
Credits adapted from the liner notes of La Roux.

=== Recording and management ===
- Recorded at Elfin Studios (Teddington, London)
- Mixed at Mr Dan's (London)
- Published by Big Life Music Ltd.

=== Personnel ===
- Elly Jackson – vocals, production
- Ben Langmaid – production
- Dan Carey – mixing

== Charts ==
Chart (2009)	Peak position
Belgium (Ultratip Bubbling Under Flanders)	19
UK Singles (OCC)	129

== Release history ==
Region	Date	Format	Label	Ref.
Original release
France	15 December 2008	12-inch single; digital EP	Kitsuné	
United States	14 April 2009	EP; digital EP	Cherrytree; Interscope	
United States	9 June 2009	12-inch single	Cherrytree; Interscope	
United Kingdom	2 July 2009	Digital single	Polydor	
Re-release
United Kingdom	22 November 2009	Digital EP	Polydor	
United Kingdom	23 November 2009	CD single; 7-inch single	Polydor	
