= I'm Not Your Toy =

Single by La Roux

from the album La Roux
- Released: 27 September 2009
- Studio: Elfin (Teddington, London)
- Genre: Synth-pop
- Length: 3:19
- Label: Polydor
- Songwriters: Elly Jackson; Ben Langmaid
- Producers: Ben Langmaid; Elly Jackson

La Roux singles chronology
"Bulletproof" (2009)	"I'm Not Your Toy" (2009)	"Uptight Downtown" (2014)

Music video
- "I'm Not Your Toy" on YouTube

"I'm Not Your Toy" is a song by English synth-pop duo La Roux from their eponymous debut studio album (2009). Written and produced by the duo's members, Elly Jackson and Ben Langmaid, the song was released as the album's fourth and final single on 27 September 2009. It was made available on CD, 12-inch vinyl and digital formats, including two remixes by Jack Beats and DatA. The single debuted at number 91 on the UK Singles Chart for the week of 20 September 2009, based on digital sales from La Roux, peaking two weeks later at number 27. The song has a distinctly Caribbean sound, incorporating the Stylophone synthesiser (marketed as a children's toy in the 1960s and 1970s) as a main lead and bass sound.

== Critical reception ==
"I'm Not Your Toy" received mixed reviews from music critics. David Balls of Digital Spy gave the song two out of five stars, stating, "Neither as charming as their breakthrough nor as instantly catchy as their recent chart-topper, 'I'm Not Your Toy' is a plodding and disposable effort that lacks any real magic or flare." He further characterised the song's choice for a single as "a missed opportunity" since "[t]heir album offers more depth and variety than the uninitiated might expect." In a more positive review, Luke Turner of NME wrote that the song's "calypso flick no doubt had Lily Allen green-faced during La Roux's recent support slot." NME later placed the song at number 41 on its list of the 50 Best Tracks of 2009, commenting that "Elly's voice never embodied heartbreak more sharply."

== Music video ==
The music video for "I'm Not Your Toy", directed by AlexandLiane, is set in a futuristic spa resort with tropical plants and fruits surrounding a swimming pool. The video shows Jackson sitting on a throne, watching an alter ego version of herself performing the song. Slowly her music attracts a large audience of all ages. Originally they listen with skeptical expressions on their faces, but they begin to enjoy the rhythm of the song. Knowing that the onlookers are happy, Jackson relaxes, and enjoys singing the song alongside four female dancers. Jackson looks again into another room, where several people from the previous scene and others put on sunglasses that seem to be playing the music. The people then start dancing while two children watch with further skepticism. The scene then swaps back to the spa location, where all the group are dancing and laughing. La Roux bandmates Mickey, Mikey and Will have a brief cameo amongst the crowd that Jackson attracted.

== Track listings ==
- UK CD single
1. "I'm Not Your Toy" – 3:19
2. "I'm Not Your Toy" (Jack Beats Remix) – 5:37
3. "I'm Not Your Toy" (DatA Remix) – 5:16
- UK 12-inch single

A1. "I'm Not Your Toy" – 3:19
A2. "I'm Not Your Toy" (Jack Beats Remix) – 5:37
B1. "I'm Not Your Toy" (DatA Remix) – 5:16

- Digital EP
1. "I'm Not Your Toy" – 3:19
2. "I'm Not Your Toy" (Jack Beats Remix) – 5:37
3. "I'm Not Your Toy" (DatA Remix) – 5:15
4. "I'm Not Your Toy" (Nero Remix) – 5:34

== Credits and personnel ==
Credits adapted from the liner notes of La Roux.

=== Recording and management ===
- Recorded at Elfin Studios (Teddington, London)
- Mixed at MixStar Studios (Virginia Beach, Virginia)
- Published by Big Life Music Ltd.

=== Personnel ===
- Elly Jackson – vocals, production
- Ben Langmaid – production
- Serban Ghenea – mixing
- John Hanes – mix engineering
- Tim Roberts – mix engineering assistance

== Charts ==
Weekly chart performance for "I'm Not Your Toy"
Chart (2009–10)	Peak position
Australia (ARIA)	79
Belgium (Ultratip Bubbling Under Flanders)	14
Scottish Singles Sales (Official Charts)	12
UK Singles (Official Charts)	27

== Release history ==
Region	Date	Format	Label	Ref.
United Kingdom	27 September 2009	Digital EP	Polydor	
United Kingdom	28 September 2009	CD single; 12-inch single	Polydor	
