= 21st Century Life =

2008 single by Sam Sparro

Single by Sam Sparro

from the album Sam Sparro
- B-side: "American Boy"; "Black and Gold"; "No End in Sight"
- Released: 21 July 2008
- Genre: Disco-pop
- Length: 4:21 (album version) 3:31 (JW Mix Radio Edit)
- Label: Island; Modus Vivendi; EMI
- Songwriters: Sam Falson; Jesse Rogg
- Producers: Jesse Rogg; Paul Epworth

Sam Sparro singles chronology
"Black and Gold" (2008)	"21st Century Life" (2008)	"Pocket" (2008)

"21st Century Life" is the second single from Sam Sparro's eponymous debut album, released on 21 July 2008.

The Song was featured on one episode of Britannia High and it is also the theme music to the BBC Three drama, Personal Affairs.

The song made it to BBC Radio 1's C-List, but was later dropped.

It was performed on the first live result show on reality television series, So You Think You Can Dance Australia, on 16 February 2009

The song was one of 50 tracks selected for the official NBA 2K17 soundtrack, which was curated by Grimes, Imagine Dragons and Noah Shebib.

== Music video ==
The video features Sparro dancing and singing in front of bright backgrounds intercut with animations of cardboard cut-out characters. The video was directed by Mariah Garnett.

== Track listing ==
UK CD single

1. "21st Century Life" (Radio Edit) – 3:31
2. "American Boy" (Radio 1 Live Lounge) – 3:37
3. "Black and Gold" (Radio 1 Live Lounge) – 4:19
4. "No End in Sight" – 3:55
5. "21st Century Life" (Denis the Menace & Big World Club Mix) – 7:07

21st Century Life + Remixes – Digital EP 1

1. 21st Century Life (JW Mix Radio Edit) – 3:31
2. 21st Century Life (Steve Mac Remix) – 8:27
3. 21st Century Life (Denis The Menace & Big World Club Mix) – 7:08
4. 21st Century Life (Count And Sinden Sidewinder Remix) – 4:55
5. 21st Century Life (Eazy Remix) – 6:23

21st Century Life + B-Sides – Digital EP 2

1. 21st Century Life – 4:21
2. No End in Sight – 3:55
3. American Boy (Radio 1 Live Lounge) – 3:37
4. 21st Century Life (Mac Project Remix) – 8:27
5. 21st Century Life (Kraak & Smaak Remix) – 7:09

== Official versions and remixes ==
- Album Version
- JW Mix Radio Edit
- The Count & Sinden Sidewinder Remix
- Denis The Menace & Big World Club Mix
- Eazy Remix
- Kraak and Smaak Remix
- Mac Project Main Mix
- Mac Project Mix Acapella
- Mac Project Mix Instrumental
- Steve Mac Dub
- Steve Mac Remix

== Personnel ==
Credits adapted from the liner notes of Sam Sparro.

- Paul Epworth – production
- James Bowen Falson – guitar
- Sam Falson – vocals, writing, production
- Dan Grech-Marugerat – mixing
- Jesse Rogg – writing, production

== Charts ==
On 27 July 2008, the song entered the UK Singles Chart at number 77 on downloads alone and peaked at number 44. Even though the single was released in 2008 the song did not chart in the Australian ARIA chart until February 2009.

Chart (2008)	Peak Position
Australia ARIA Singles Chart	42
Japan Hot 100	87
UK Singles Chart	44
