= La Roux (album) =

Studio album by La Roux
- Released: 26 June 2009
- Recorded: 2008–2009
- Studio: Elfin (Teddington, London) (Note: All tracks); Westpoint (London) (Note: Tracks 2, 9 and 10); RAK (London) (Note: Tracks 5, 7, 8, 11 and 12)
- Genre: Synth-pop
- Length: 44:31
- Label: Polydor
- Producer: Ben Langmaid; Elly Jackson; Ben Hirst

La Roux chronology
La Roux (2009)	Trouble in Paradise (2014)

Singles from La Roux
- 1. "Quicksand" Released: 15 December 2008; 2. "In for the Kill" Released: 16 March 2009; 3. "Bulletproof" Released: 22 June 2009; 4. "I'm Not Your Toy" Released: 28 September 2009

La Roux is the debut studio album by English synth-pop duo La Roux, released on 26 June 2009 by Polydor Records. The album peaked at number two on the UK Albums Chart and was certified platinum by the British Phonographic Industry (BPI). It includes the singles "In for the Kill" and "Bulletproof", which reached numbers two and one on the UK Singles Chart, respectively.

The album was nominated for the 2009 Mercury Prize, and won the Grammy Award for Best Electronic/Dance Album at the 2011 ceremony. A 10-track Gold Edition of the album was released digitally in the United States on 8 February 2011, including the Kanye West-assisted version of "In for the Kill".

== Singles ==
"Quicksand" was released as the album's lead single on 15 December 2008, originally reaching number 153 on the UK Singles Chart. The song was re-released on 23 November 2009 and rose to a new peak position of number 129 on the UK chart.

"In for the Kill" was released as the album's second single on 16 March 2009. The song peaked at number two on the UK Singles Chart for four consecutive weeks, while reaching the top 15 in Ireland and Norway, the top 40 in Australia and the top 50 in Belgium.

"Bulletproof" was released as the album's third single on 22 June 2009. The single debuted at number one on the UK Singles Chart, becoming La Roux's first chart-topper. The track reached number three in Austria, number five in Australia, Belgium and Ireland, number seven in New Zealand and number 13 in Germany. "Bulletproof" also became the duo's first entry on the Billboard Hot 100 in the United States, peaking at number eight.

"I'm Not Your Toy" was released as the album's fourth and final single on 28 September 2009. Speaking to The Guardian on 22 July 2009, La Roux's lead singer Elly Jackson explained that the duo chose to release the single in the summer because she "think[s] sunny weather drives you towards certain tempos and melodies that work well booming out of open windows", adding that the song "has a brightness that wouldn't work in winter." It peaked at number 27 on the UK Singles Chart.

On 15 July 2010, Jackson uploaded a behind-the-scenes preview of the music video for "Tigerlily" on YouTube discussing its theme. However, neither the single nor the video ever materialised.

== Critical reception ==
Professional ratings
Aggregate scores
Source	Rating
AnyDecentMusic?	6.8/10
Metacritic	76/100
Review scores
Source	Rating
AllMusic	4/5 stars
The Daily Telegraph	4/5 stars
The Guardian	3/5 stars
The Irish Times	4/5 stars
Mojo	3/5 stars
NME	9/10
Pitchfork	7.0/10
Q	4/5 stars
Rolling Stone	4/5 stars
The Times	3/5 stars

La Roux received generally positive reviews from music critics. At Metacritic, which assigns a normalised rating out of 100 to reviews from mainstream publications, the album received an average score of 76, based on 16 reviews. Luke Turner of NME raved that "with this astounding debut, an unassuming 21-year-old from SW2 has revitalised a forgotten form to make one of the finest forward-thinking British pop albums of recent memory." Steve Harris of Clash viewed the album as "[t]he ultimate expression of '80s love" and stated that "apart from a couple of later tracks, the album is far from filler and still delivers blow after blow of superb songcraft." Heather Phares of AllMusic opined that "La Roux's dedication to their aesthetic makes this an album where the songs are variations on a theme, and on the rare occasion where the songwriting isn't razor-sharp, the style threatens to overtake the substance. However, that devotion also makes La Roux a standout, not just among the many other '80s revivalists, but the entire late-2000s pop landscape." Rolling Stone's Rob Sheffield commented, "Along with co-writer and fellow synth dude Ben Langmaid, [Elly Jackson is] ruling U.K. radio with splashy dance hits about sex and betrayal", highlighting "Bulletproof" as the album's "definitive gem".

Talia Kraines of BBC Music wrote, "That shrill vocal might mean the [...] album is not something you're likely to listen to all in one go in a high pressure situation, but it's one jam-packed with killer pop song after killer pop song." Slant Magazine reviewer Paul Schrodt described La Roux's sound as "frosty, uniquely British, deliberately affected, and anything but casual", but felt that "it's the band's attempts at vulnerability ('Cover My Eyes') that make for the most insipid listens." Pitchfork's Joshua Love noted that "La Roux delivers icy but irresistible throwback pop that hearkens back explicitly to fellow femme-led Brits Yazoo and the Eurythmics." The Guardian's Alexis Petridis wrote, "The sound is authentically tinny, bass being something that most synthpop pioneers seemed to think the gleaming 'Music of the Future' could do without. The rhythms tend to a clipped, funkless boom-crash that listeners of a certain vintage may find difficult to hear without picturing a school disco dancefloor packed with fourth-formers trying to 'do' robotics." Peter Paphides of The Times expressed, "For the almost militant purity of its execution though, La Roux inspires a peculiar sort of awe. Exclusively using keyboards is one thing, but the Brixton-based duo have gone a step further, purging their sound of any keyboard noise that bears even a passing resemblance to what your Jeremy Clarkson sort of music fan would refer to as a 'real' instrument." Simon Price was critical of the album in his review for The Independent, stating that "[m]uch of the time, La Roux sound strangely distorted, like the backing music from an early 1990s Sega Mega Drive game turned up to 11."

=== Accolades ===
La Roux was shortlisted for the 2009 Mercury Prize. On 13 February 2011, the album won Best Electronic/Dance Album at the 53rd Annual Grammy Awards.

Accolades for La Roux
Publication	Accolade	Rank	Ref.
The Guardian	Albums of 2009	9	
musicOMH	Top 50 Best Albums of 2009	33	
NME	50 Best Albums of 2009	13	
Q	50 Best Albums of 2009	30	

== Commercial performance ==
La Roux debuted at number two on the UK Albums Chart with 62,650 copies sold in its first week, becoming the third fastest-selling debut album of 2009 in the United Kingdom after Susan Boyle's I Dreamed a Dream and Florence and the Machine's Lungs, respectively. The album was certified platinum by the British Phonographic Industry (BPI) on 12 February 2010, and by July 2014, it had sold 416,667 copies in the UK. As of May 2014, La Roux had sold over two million copies worldwide.

== Track listing ==
All tracks are written by Elly Jackson and Ben Langmaid, except where noted.

No.	Title	Writer(s)	Length
1.	"In for the Kill"		4:08
2.	"Tigerlily"	Jackson; Langmaid; Darren Berry	3:24
3.	"Quicksand"		3:05
4.	"Bulletproof"		3:25
5.	"Colourless Colour"	Jackson; Ben Hirst	3:30
6.	"I'm Not Your Toy"		3:18
7.	"Cover My Eyes"		4:32
8.	"As If by Magic"		3:51
9.	"Fascination"		3:41
10.	"Reflections Are Protection"		4:19
11.	"Armour Love"	Jackson; Langmaid; Berry	3:53
12.	"Growing Pains" (bonus track)	Jackson; Langmaid; Jeff Patterson	3:27
Total length:			44:31

Australian, European and Japanese iTunes Store bonus track
No.	Title	Length
13.	"In for the Kill" (Skream's Let's Get Ravey Remix)	5:02
Total length:		49:33

US iTunes Store bonus track
No.	Title	Length
13.	"Finally My Saviour"	4:19
Total length:		48:50

Amazon Music and Record Store Day 2010 bonus track
No.	Title	Length
13.	"Bulletproof" (demo version)	3:26
Total length:		47:57

Australian limited edition bonus tracks
No.	Title	Length
13.	"In for the Kill" (Skream's Let's Get Ravey Remix)	5:02
14.	"In for the Kill" (video)
15.	"Quicksand" (video)
Total length:		49:33

French limited edition bonus tracks
No.	Title	Length
13.	"Finally My Saviour"	4:21
14.	"In for the Kill" (Skream's Let's Get Ravey Remix)	5:04
15.	"Bulletproof" (Tiborg Remix)	3:29
16.	"Bulletproof" (Zinc Remix)	5:51
Total length:		63:16

Japanese edition bonus tracks
No.	Title	Length
13.	"Finally My Saviour"	4:21
14.	"In for the Kill" (Skream's Let's Get Ravey Remix)	5:04
15.	"Bulletproof" (Tepr TsunAimee Remix)	5:35
Total length:		59:31

=== Gold Edition ===
No.	Title	Writer(s)	Length
1.	"In for the Kill" (featuring Kanye West)		4:41
2.	"Finally My Saviour"		4:19
3.	"Under My Thumb"	Mick Jagger; Keith Richards	3:46
4.	"I'm Not Your Toy" (Jack Beats Remix)		5:37
5.	"In for the Kill" (Skream's Let's Get Ravey Remix)		5:02
6.	"Quicksand" (Boy 8 Bit Remix)		5:56
7.	"Bulletproof" (Zinc Remix)		5:49
8.	"Tigerlily" (demo)	Jackson; Langmaid; Berry	3:49
9.	"Bulletproof" (intimate session at Abbey Road, acoustic)		3:01
10.	"In for the Kill" (Vevo Lounge version)		3:28
Total length:			45:28

US iTunes Store bonus video
No.	Title	Length
11.	"In for the Kill" (the making of)	3:18

== Personnel ==
Credits adapted from the liner notes of La Roux.

=== Musicians ===
- Elly Jackson – vocals
- London Community Gospel Choir – backing vocals (track 7)
- Kit Jackson – spoken word (uncredited) (track 2)

=== Technical ===
- Ben Langmaid – production
- Elly Jackson – production
- Ben Hirst – production (track 5)
- Serban Ghenea – mixing (tracks 1, 2, 4–12)
- John Hanes – mix engineering (tracks 1, 2, 4–12)
- Tim Roberts – mix engineering assistance (tracks 1, 2, 4–12)
- Dan Carey – mixing (track 3)
- Ian Sherwin – engineering (tracks 2, 5, 7–12)

=== Artwork ===
- Andy Whitton – photography
- Alexander Brown – photography, art direction, design
- Traffic – art direction, design
- Hannah Neaves – art direction, design

== Charts ==
=== Weekly charts ===
Weekly chart performance for La Roux
Chart (2009–2010)	Peak position
Australian Albums (ARIA)	22
Australian Dance Albums (ARIA)	3
Austrian Albums (Ö3 Austria)	34
Belgian Albums (Ultratop Flanders)	34
Belgian Albums (Ultratop Wallonia)	95
Canadian Albums (Nielsen SoundScan)	34
Croatian International Albums (HDU)	23
Dutch Albums (Album Top 100)	55
European Albums (Billboard)	13
French Albums (SNEP)	115
German Albums (Offizielle Top 100)	54
Irish Albums (IRMA)	7
Italian Albums (FIMI)	95
New Zealand Albums (RMNZ)	26
Norwegian Albums (VG-lista)	36
Scottish Albums (OCC)	3
Swiss Albums (Schweizer Hitparade)	54
UK Albums (OCC)	2
US Billboard 200	70
US Top Dance Albums (Billboard)	4

=== Year-end charts ===
2009 year-end chart performance for La Roux
Chart (2009)	Position
Australian Albums (ARIA)	67
Australian Dance Albums (ARIA)	11
UK Albums (OCC)	43

2010 year-end chart performance for La Roux
Chart (2010)	Position
Australian Dance Albums (ARIA)	39
UK Albums (OCC)	142
US Top Dance/Electronic Albums (Billboard)	4

=== Decade-end charts ===
Decade-end chart performance for La Roux
Chart (2010–2019)	Position
US Top Dance/Electronic Albums (Billboard)	48

== Certifications and sales ==
Certifications and sales for La Roux
Region	Certification	Certified units/sales
Australia (ARIA)	Gold	35,000^{^}
Ireland (IRMA)	Platinum	15,000^{^}
New Zealand (RMNZ)	Platinum	15,000^{‡}
United Kingdom (BPI)	Platinum	416,667
United States	—	207,000
Summaries
Worldwide	—	2,000,000
^{^} Shipments figures based on certification alone.^{‡} Sales+streaming figures based on certification alone.

== Release history ==
Release history for La Roux
Region	Date	Edition	Label	Ref.
Germany	26 June 2009	Standard	Universal	
Netherlands	26 June 2009	Standard	Universal	
Poland	26 June 2009	Standard	Universal	
Ireland	26 June 2009	Standard	Polydor	
United Kingdom	29 June 2009	Standard	Polydor	
France	29 June 2009	Standard	Universal	
Sweden	29 June 2009	Standard	Universal	
Australia	3 July 2009	Standard	Universal	
Canada	28 July 2009	Standard	Universal	
Japan	5 August 2009	Standard	Universal	
United States	29 September 2009	Standard	Cherrytree; Interscope	
Italy	16 October 2009	Standard	Universal	
France	23 October 2009	Limited	Universal	
