= Return to Paradise (Sam Sparro album) =

Studio album by Sam Sparro
- Released: 1 June 2012
- Recorded: 2009–2011
- Genre: Synthpop; disco; house; soul
- Length: 47:03
- Label: EMI
- Producer: Jesse Rogg; Sam Sparro; Jono Sloan; Lester Mendez; Greg Kurstin; Tim Anderson

Sam Sparro chronology
Sam Sparro (2008)	Return to Paradise (2012)	Boombox Eternal (2020)

Singles from Return to Paradise
- 1. "Happiness" Released: 17 February 2012; 2. "I Wish I Never Met You" Released: 1 June 2012; 3. "Yellow Orange Rays" Released: 9 November 2012

Return to Paradise is Australian singer-songwriter and producer Sam Sparro's second album. It was released on 1 June 2012. The album entered the Australian Albums Chart, peaking at number 41. In Belgium the album peaked at number 35 on the Belgian (Flanders) Albums Chart, and number 80 in the Netherlands on the Dutch Albums Chart. The album had less success in the United Kingdom; however, it failed to produce any charting singles.

== Background ==
This album has a different sound compared to his previous album. Whereas Sam Sparro was primarily a dance-pop and electropop album, Return to Paradise is influenced by disco, especially '90s house. Sparro again worked with producer and long-time friend Jesse Rogg, who helped to produce almost every track on Sparro's debut album Sam Sparro. Sparro's father, Chris Falson, is cited as having played guitar on the track "Closer". Sparro also worked with Charlie Wilcox on the songs "Happiness" and "We Could Fly", who he had previously worked with on "Still Hungry", the hidden track from his debut album. Sparro's old friend Felix Bloxsom, who he went to school with in Sydney, is featured on drums on multiple tracks from the album, and produced the Plastic Plates Remix of "Shades of Grey", which was later included on Re-Return to Paradise. Sparro worked on a few songs with Jono Sloan. John Fields is responsible for mixing almost all tracks from Return to Paradise. Lester Mendez, who has previously worked with Sparro on the tracks "Shady" and "Broken English" written for Adam Lambert's second album Trespassing, helped write the album's title track "Return to Paradise". Isabella Summers of Florence + the Machine worked on "Shades of Gray". Bethany Cosentino of Best Coast sang backing vocals for and co-wrote "Yellow Orange Rays". The Swedish pop singer-songwriter, Erik Hassle, is one of the writers of the second single, "I Wish I Never Met You". Greg Kurstin and Stuart Zender are also featured writers, producers, and instrumentalists on the album.

== Singles ==
1. "The Shallow End" was the first song from Return to Paradise to be released, as of 31 January 2012, in a music video assembled of footage shot by Sparro over the past year. The song was never given an official single release, but was released as a promotional single. The song peaked at number 5, number 6, and number 31 on various Belgian charts.
2. "Happiness" was released as the lead single from the album on 17 February 2012. The song peaked at number 1 in Belgium, number 3 in Poland, number 16 in Italy, and number 70 in the Netherlands. Its remix EP includes remixes by The Magician Remix and Kim Anh, both of which appear on Re-Return to Paradise.
3. "I Wish I Never Met You" was released as the second single from the album on 1 June 2012. Its remix EP featured remixes by Stereogamous and Azari & III, both of which appear on the re-release of the album.
4. "Yellow Orange Rays" was released on 9 November 2012 as the third official single from the album. Released only in Belgium, the song peaked at number 74 and number 2 on two local charts. The single's B-side, the Bodyspasm Remix, appears on Re-Return to Paradise.

== Critical reception ==
Professional ratings
Review scores
Source	Rating
AllMusic	4.5/5 stars
The Guardian	2/5 stars
The Line of Best Fit	3/10
MusicOMH	1.5/5 stars

In a review for AllMusic, critic reviewer Matt Collar described the release as a "groove-oriented R&B, immaculately produced with a disco and house music purist's ear for period details." He went on to say, "Sparro imbues each of these songs with an intensity, passion, and palpable love that shines through even when he's singing about heartbreak and negativity." At The Independent, music journalist Simon Price was critical of Return to Paradise noting "the Australian electro-soul auteur's second album is a patchy affair which too often fails to transcend its blatant P-funk influences."

== Track listing ==
No.	Title	Writer(s)	Producer(s)	Length
1.	"Paradise People"	Sam Sparro, Jono Sloan	Jesse Rogg, Jono Sloan, Sam Sparro	4:00
2.	"Happiness"	Sparro, Charlie Wilcocks, Jesse Rogg	Rogg, Sparro*	3:05
3.	"Let the Love In"	Sparro	Sparro, Rogg	3:45
4.	"Yellow Orange Rays"	Sparro, Tim Anderson, Bethany Cosentino	Tim Anderson	3:24
5.	"Hearts Like Us"	Sparro	Sparro, Rogg	4:09
6.	"I Wish I Never Met You"	Sparro, Rogg, Erik Hassle	Rogg	4:17
7.	"Shades of Grey"	Sparro, Rogg, Isabella Summers	Rogg, Sparro*	4:09
8.	"We Could Fly"	Sparro, Wilcocks, Stuart Zender	Sparro, Rogg	6:20
9.	"Closer"	Sparro, Sloan	Sparro, Rogg	4:11
10.	"The Shallow End"	Sparro, Greg Kurstin, Rogg	Greg Kurstin, Rogg	5:18
11.	"Return to Paradise"	Sparro, Lester Mendez	Lester Mendez	4:25
Total length:				47:03

Japanese bonus track
No.	Title	Writer(s)	Producer(s)	Length
12.	"I Wish I Never Met You" (Alison Wonderland Remix)	Sparro, Rogg, Erik Hassle	Rogg (remix and additional production by Alison Wonderland)	4:32
Total length:				51:35

Australian bonus track
No.	Title	Writer(s)	Length
12.	"Are You Alright?"	Sparro, David, Blake	3:57
Total length:			50:59

Deluxe edition bonus tracks
No.	Title	Writer(s)	Length
12.	"Are You Alright?"	Sparro, Michael Brian David, Tyler Andelin Blake	4:01
13.	"Quarter Life Crisis"	Sam Falson, Julian Brody, Jesse Rogg	2:50
Total length:			53:49

US iTunes edition
No.	Title	Remix and additional production by	Length
14.	"Happiness" (The Magician Remix)	Stephen Fasano	3:38
15.	"I Wish I Never Met You" (Azari & III Remix)	Dinamo Azari, Alixander III	5:47
16.	"Let the Love In" (Tiger & Woods Remix)	Larry Tiger, David Woods	9:38
17.	"I Wish I Never Met You" (Stereogamous Remix)	John Taranto, Paul McDermott	5:56
18.	"Shades of Grey" (Plastic Plates Remix)	Felix Bloxsom	4:56
19.	"Hearts Like Us" (Mike Simonetti Remix)	Mike Simonetti	5:44
20.	"Happiness" (Kim Anh & Small Pyramids Remix)	Kim Anh, Zach Hunsaker	6:28
Total length:			95:56

Australian iTunes Re-Return to Paradise edition
No.	Title	Remix and additional production by	Length
12.	"Happiness" (The Magician Remix)	Fasano	3:38
13.	"I Wish I Never Met You" (Azari & III Remix)	Azari, III	5:47
14.	"Let the Love In" (Tiger & Woods Remix)	Tiger, Woods	9:38
15.	"I Wish I Never Met You" (Stereogamous Remix)	Taranto, McDermott	5:56
16.	"Shades of Grey" (Plastic Plates Remix)	Bloxsom	4:56
17.	"Hearts Like Us" (Mike Simonetti Remix)	Simonetti	5:44
18.	"Happiness" (Kim Anh & Small Pyramids Remix)	Anh, Hunsaker	6:28
Total length:			89:10

UK iTunes Re-Return to Paradise edition
No.	Title	Remix and additional production by	Length
12.	"Happiness" (The Magician Remix)	Fasano	3:38
13.	"I Wish I Never Met You" (Azari & III Remix)	Azari, III	5:47
14.	"Let the Love In" (Tiger & Woods Remix)	Tiger, Woods	9:38
15.	"Yellow Orange Rays" (Bodyspasm Remix)	Bodyspasm	3:56
16.	"I Wish I Never Met You" (Stereogamous Remix)	Taranto, McDermott	5:56
17.	"Shades of Grey" (Plastic Plates Remix)	Bloxsom	4:56
18.	"Hearts Like Us" (Mike Simonetti Remix)	Simonetti	5:45
19.	"Happiness" (Beni Remix)	Anh, Hunsaker	5:17
Total length:			93:06

Note

- (*) denotes co-producer.

== Personnel ==
Credits adapted from the liner notes of Return to Paradise.

- Tyler Andelin Blake – writer
- Felix Bloxsom – drums, remix engineering
- James Bowen – guitar
- Julian Brody – writer, guitar
- Bethany Cosentino – background vocals
- Michael Brian David – writer
- Jason Disu – trombone
- Chris Falson^{[a]} – guitar
- Sam Falson – vocals, background vocals, writing, production, co-production, strings and horns arranging, tambourine, agogôs, synths, additional synths, additional piano
- John Fields – mixing
- Steve Graeber – saxophone
- Erik Hassle – writing
- Greg Kurstin – additional vocals, writing, production, all instruments
- Justin Elliot Lacher – photography
- Linda McCrary – background vocals, additional vocals
- Lester Mendez – writing, programming, instruments
- Caitlin Moe – violin
- Kristle Murden – background vocals, additional vocals
- Posey MFG – management
- Jesse Rogg – additional vocals, writing, production, post production, programming, additional programming, mixing, synths
- Nick Roseboro – trumpet
- Ryan Shields – percussion
- Jono Sloan – writing, production, co-production, synths, CS-80
- Isabella Summers – writing, harp, synths
- Michelle Tomaszewski – styling
- Dave Wilder – bass
- Charlie Willcocks – writing, rhodes, piano, synths
- Zama Media Management – management
- Jonathan Zawada – design, illustration
- Stuart Zender – writing, bass

Notes

- ^{^a} signifies person as Sparro's father

== Charts ==
Chart (2012)	Peak position
Australian Albums (ARIA)	41
Belgian Albums (Ultratop Flanders)	35
Belgian Albums (Ultratop Wallonia)	79
Dutch Albums (Album Top 100)	80
UK Albums (OCC)	200

== Release history ==
Region	Date	Label	Format	Edition
Australia	1 June 2012	EMI Records	CD, digital download	Standard
United Kingdom	15 June 2012	EMI Records	Digital download	Standard
United Kingdom	18 June 2012	EMI Records	CD	Standard
Japan	20 June 2012	EMI Records	CD	Standard
Australia	15 November 2012	EMI Records	Digital download	Deluxe, (Re-Return to Paradise)
United Kingdom	3 December 2012	EMI Records	Digital download	Deluxe, (Re-Return to Paradise)
United States	4 December 2012	EMI Records	Digital download	Deluxe, (Re-Return to Paradise)
