= Bulletproof (La Roux song) =

2009 single by La Roux

Single by La Roux

from the album La Roux
- Released: 21 June 2009
- Studio: Elfin (Teddington, London)
- Genre: Electropop; synth-pop
- Length: 3:25
- Label: Polydor
- Songwriters: Elly Jackson; Ben Langmaid
- Producers: Ben Langmaid; Elly Jackson

La Roux singles chronology
"In for the Kill" (2009)	"Bulletproof" (2009)	"I'm Not Your Toy" (2009)

Audio sample
- "Bulletproof": file; help

Music video
- "Bulletproof" on YouTube

"Bulletproof" is a song by English synth-pop duo La Roux from their eponymous debut studio album (2009). Written and produced by the duo's members, Elly Jackson and Ben Langmaid, the song was released digitally in the United Kingdom on 21 June 2009 and physically the following day as the album's third single.

"Bulletproof" was met with both critical and commercial success, debuting at number one on the UK Singles Chart. It was a sleeper hit in the United States, where it peaked at number eight on the Billboard Hot 100 in June 2010, following televised performances of the song on The Ellen DeGeneres Show and Last Call with Carson Daly. It also reached within the top 10 of Australia, Austria, Flanders, Ireland, New Zealand and Ukraine.

In 2023, Jackson teamed up with Chromeo and released a rework of "Bulletproof", titled "Discoproof", on 25 August. This version of the track had previously been premiered during Chromeo's set at Coachella.

== Writing ==
Jackson discussed writing "Bulletproof":

We started it, and it felt really good. We had a great verse, and then we did about five choruses. The lyric went "This time I'll be... " and there was too much of a gap. We'd both been sitting there in silence for ages trying to work it out. Suddenly, we both looked up and went "This time, baby" and thought, "Yes, let's get it down." I do remember that when we wrote that, we thought "Call the manager, we've got the one".

== Critical reception ==
"Bulletproof" received widespread acclaim from music critics. One author of Pitchfork called it "a catchy-as-hell electro-pop smash", and another, Joshua Love, called it the best song on La Roux. Digital Spy music editor Nick Levine gave the song five stars and described it as "a bright, bouncy slice of Yazoo-ish electropop with a chorus every bit as immediate as 'In For The Kill'", adding that "Jackson's vocals are less shrill this time around, but she comes off just as formidable, informing a useless sod who's messed her about that she won't be letting him do it again." Fraser McAlpine of the BBC Chart Blog, who also awarded the song five stars, stated that "the one sentence that crops up most often goes something like this: "...yes, 'Bulletproof' is brilliant, but...", hinting that this might be a song which possesses magical powers of persuasion." He went on to give five points on why the song is good: marvellous verses, marvellous chorus, the music serves the song brilliantly, less shrill to the singing, and the vocoder breakdown. Adam R. Holz of Plugged In (publication) opined "Homage isn't a strong enough word to capture just how uncannily La Roux has repackaged that vibe of yore popularized by the likes of Erasure, The Human League, Depeche Mode and Eurythmics."

In a more mixed review from Common Sense Media, however, Stephanie Bruzzese gave "Bulletproof" two stars, calling the song a "less creative imitation of the classic tunes created by [1980s groups including Depeche Mode, Erasure, and The Human League]" and criticizing the chorus for being "nothing unique" and Jackson's vocal performance which she described as "a higher, whinier version of Alison Moyet's". On a lighter note, she highlighted the lyrical content for being clean and the strong positive message, suggesting to parents that the song was appropriate for kids twelve years of age or older.

In a September 2014 interview, Jackson expressed regrets of the song's critical and commercial success, because it was one of the reasons she was experiencing panic attacks while touring for the debut album: "I wasn't that keen on it. I don't know if I want to have a hit like that again [...] But it's 10 years ago for me now and I think it's weird when so many people see you as being represented by that song, and you feel so far away from it. [...] You stop being able to be respected in any way, shape, or form. I started to feel that basically [...] I really didn't like it" Also in the interview, she looked back at the song's music video while acknowledging the song's positive impact on her life, saying, "I wish I could erase it! I don't want it to erase the house that I bought from it."

== Accolades ==
Year	Publication	Country	Rank	List
2009	Rolling Stone	United States	25	The 25 Best Songs of 2009

== Track listings ==
- UK CD single
1. "Bulletproof" – 3:25
2. "Bulletproof" (Zinc Remix) – 4:49
3. "Bulletproof" (Tepr Remix) – 5:36
- UK 7-inch single

A. "Bulletproof" – 3:25

- UK digital EP
1. "Bulletproof" – 3:25
2. "Bulletproof" (Zinc Remix) – 5:48
3. "Bulletproof" (Tepr TsunAimee Remix) – 5:35
- US CD single
1. "Bulletproof" – 3:25
2. "Bulletproof" (Tepr TsunAimee Remix) – 5:35
3. "Bulletproof" (Zinc Remix) – 5:48
4. "Bulletproof" (Lagos Boys Choir Remix) – 5:16
- US digital EP – Remixes
1. "Bulletproof" (Dave Audé Cherry Radio Remix) – 3:55
2. "Bulletproof" (Manhattan Clique Remix Radio) – 3:27
3. "Bulletproof" (Tepr TsunAimee Remix) – 5:35
4. "Bulletproof" (Zinc Remix) – 5:49
5. "Bulletproof" (Lagos Boys Choir Remix) – 5:16
- The Gold EP – digital
1. "Bulletproof" (live at Shepherd's Bush) – 5:26
2. "Bulletproof" (Tim Bran Remix) – 3:26
3. "Bulletproof" (Tiborg Remix) – 3:27
4. "Bulletproof" (Fred Falke Remix) – 7:48

== Credits and personnel ==
Credits adapted from the liner notes of La Roux.

=== Recording ===
- Recorded at Elfin Studios (Teddington, London)
- Mixed at MixStar Studios (Virginia Beach, Virginia)

=== Personnel ===
- Elly Jackson – vocals, production
- Ben Langmaid – production
- Serban Ghenea – mixing
- John Hanes – mix engineering
- Tim Roberts – mix engineering assistance

== Charts ==
=== Weekly charts ===
2009–2010 weekly chart performance for "Bulletproof"
Chart (2009–2010)	Peak position
Australia (ARIA)	5
Australian Dance (ARIA)	3
Austria (Ö3 Austria Top 40)	3
Belgium (Ultratop 50 Flanders)	5
Belgium (Ultratop 50 Wallonia)	20
Canada Hot 100 (Billboard)	45
Canada CHR/Top 40 (Billboard)	9
Canada Hot AC (Billboard)	24
Czech Republic Airplay (ČNS IFPI)	21
Denmark (Tracklisten)	25
Europe (European Hot 100)	6
Germany (GfK)	13
Hungary (Rádiós Top 40)	28
Ireland (IRMA)	5
Japan (Japan Hot 100)	89
Netherlands (Dutch Top 40)	29
Netherlands (Single Top 100)	20
New Zealand (Recorded Music NZ)	7
Norway (VG-lista)	18
Scottish Singles Sales (Official Charts)	4
Slovakia Airplay (ČNS IFPI)	16
Sweden (Sverigetopplistan)	47
Switzerland (Schweizer Hitparade)	42
UK Singles (Official Charts)	1
US Billboard Hot 100	8
US Adult Contemporary (Billboard)	30
US Adult Pop Airplay (Billboard)	15
US Dance Club Songs (Billboard)	1
US Pop Airplay (Billboard)	6
US Rhythmic Airplay (Billboard)	28

2024 weekly chart performance for "Bulletproof"
Chart (2024)	Peak position
Poland (Polish Airplay Top 100)	93
US Hot Dance/Electronic Songs (Billboard)	10

=== Year-end charts ===
2009 year-end chart performance for "Bulletproof"
Chart (2009)	Position
Australia (ARIA)	47
Australian Dance (ARIA)	11
Austria (Ö3 Austria Top 40)	28
Belgium (Ultratop 50 Flanders)	67
Germany (Official German Charts)	61
Netherlands (Dutch Top 40)	213
UK Singles (OCC)	24
US Dance Club Songs (Billboard)	42

2010 year-end chart performance for "Bulletproof"
Chart (2010)	Position
Australian Dance (ARIA)	31
US Billboard Hot 100	42
US Mainstream Top 40 (Billboard)	31

2024 year-end chart performance for "Bulletproof"
Chart (2024)	Position
US Hot Dance/Electronic Songs (Billboard)	47

== Certifications ==
Certifications for "Bulletproof"
Region	Certification	Certified units/sales
Australia (ARIA)	2× Platinum	140,000^{^}
Austria (IFPI Austria)	Platinum	30,000^{*}
Canada (Music Canada)	Platinum	40,000^{*}
Denmark (IFPI Danmark)	Gold	45,000^{‡}
France (SNEP)	Gold	100,000^{‡}
Germany (BVMI)	Gold	150,000^{‡}
Italy (FIMI)	Gold	50,000^{‡}
New Zealand (RMNZ)	3× Platinum	90,000^{‡}
United Kingdom (BPI)	2× Platinum	1,200,000^{‡}
United States (RIAA)	2× Platinum	2,000,000^{*}
^{*} Sales figures based on certification alone.^{^} Shipments figures based on certification alone.^{‡} Sales+streaming figures based on certification alone.

== Release history ==
Release dates and formats for "Bulletproof"
Region	Date	Label	Format	Ref(s)
United Kingdom	21 June 2009	Polydor	Digital EP	
United Kingdom	22 June 2009	Polydor	CD single; 7-inch single	
United States	21 July 2009	Cherrytree; Interscope	CD single; digital EP	
United States	11 May 2010	Cherrytree; Interscope	Digital download – The Gold EP	

== See also ==
- List of UK Singles Chart number ones of the 2000s
- List of number-one dance singles of 2009 (U.S.)
