= MTV Australia Awards 2009 =

Annual Australian music awards ceremony

2009 MTV Australia Awards
- Date: 27 March 2009
- Location: Sydney Convention and Exhibition Centre, Darling Harbour, Sydney
- Hosted by: Pete Wentz

Television/radio coverage
- Network: MTV Australia

The Vodafone MTV Australia Awards 2009 is the fifth annual MTV Awards show from MTV Australia. The Awards were held on 27 March 2009 at the Sydney Convention and Exhibition Centre, Darling Harbour, Sydney.

== Background information ==
The show's air date was originally announced on 16 February 2009 and the nominees for the show were announced on 19 February 2009. The awards show will be produced by American producer Alex Coletti who produced the 2003 MTV Video Music Awards. It was announced on 22 February 2009 that Fall Out Boy band member Pete Wentz would host the event. The public will vote for the winners of all eight categories with the voting commencing on 23 February and concluding on 25 March. The show will be broadcast on MTV World Stage around the world. On the show special appearances were made by Vanilla Ice, Ashlee Simpson and Wolfmother.

== Performers ==
- The Killers
- Kings of Leon (Live via satellite from TSB Bank Arena, Wellington, New Zealand)
- Sia
- The Fray
- Jessica Mauboy
- Kaiser Chiefs (red carpet)
- Wolfmother

== Presenters ==
- Audrina Patridge (red carpet)
- Lara Bingle
- Rhys Darby
- Dannii Minogue
- Duffy
- Mark Hoppus
- Delta Goodrem
- Estella Warren
- Vanilla Ice
- Robbie Maddison

== Winners and nominees ==
The winners are in bold.

Video of the Year
**Pink – "So What"**; Beyoncé – "Single Ladies (Put A Ring On It)"; Flo Rida feat. T-Pain – "Low"; Lady Gaga – "Poker Face"; Kings of Leon – "Sex On Fire"
Best Aussie	Best Kiwi
**Jessica Mauboy**; The Veronicas; The Presets; The Living End; Gabriella Cilmi	**Nesian Mystik**; Cut Off Your Hands; P Money; Goodnight Nurse; Ladyhawke
Best Breakthrough	Independent Spirit
**Katy Perry**; Lady Gaga; The Ting Tings; MGMT; Empire of the Sun	**Sneaky Sound System**; Ladyhawke; Sia; Bliss n Eso; Cut Copy
Best Rock Video	Best Dance Video
**Fall Out Boy – "I Don't Care"**; Kings of Leon – "Sex on Fire"; The Killers – "Human"; Paramore – "Decode"; Kaiser Chiefs – "Never Miss A Beat"	**The Ian Carey Project – "Get Shaky"**; The Presets – "Talk Like That"; The Potbelleez – "Are You With Me"; Sam Sparro – "Black & Gold"; Sneaky Sound System – "Kansas City"
Best Collaboration	Best Moves
**T.I. feat. Rihanna – "Live Your Life"**; Jessica Mauboy feat. Flo Rida – "Running Back"; Jordin Sparks feat. Chris Brown – "No Air"; Estelle featuring Kanye West – "American Boy"; Kevin Rudolf featuring Lil Wayne – "Let It Rock"	**Britney Spears – "Circus"**; Pussycat Dolls – "When I Grow Up"; Chris Brown – "Forever"; Beyoncé – "Single Ladies (Put A Ring On It)"; Madonna feat. Justin Timberlake – "4 Minutes"
