= Happiness (Sam Sparro song) =

Single by Sam Sparro

from the album Return to Paradise
- Released: 17 February 2012
- Recorded: 2011
- Genre: Pop; disco; dance-pop
- Length: 3:06
- Label: EMI
- Songwriter(s): Sam Falson; Charlie Willcocks; Jesse Rogg
- Producer(s): Jesse Rogg; Sam Falson

Sam Sparro singles chronology
"The Shallow End" (2012)	"Happiness" (2012)	"I Wish I Never Met You" (2012)

"Happiness" is a song by Australian singer-songwriter, music producer, and former child actor Sam Sparro. The song was released on 17 February 2012 as the lead single from his second studio album Return to Paradise (2012). The single was certified platinum by the Belgian Entertainment Association.

The song hit number one in the Belgian charts. The Magician Remix (by Belgian DJ Stephen Fasano) is the version that is most popular in Belgium (and the one that made the hit list).

== Music video ==
A music video to accompany the release of "Happiness" was first released onto YouTube on 8 March 2012 at a total length of three minutes and seven seconds.

== Live performances ==
On 2 March 2012 Sam performed the song live Australian breakfast television program Sunrise. He also performed the song on Australian television variety program Young Talent Time.

== Track listings ==
Digital download – Single
No.	Title	Length
1.	"Happiness"	3:06

Digital download – Remixes
No.	Title	Length
1.	"Happiness"	3:05
2.	"Happiness" (The Magician Remix)	3:38
3.	"Happiness" (Kim Anh + Small Pyramids Remix)	6:28
4.	"Happiness" (Beni Remix)	5:17
5.	"Happiness" (Mr. Fingers Acid Jack Remix)	7:41
6.	"Happiness" (Mr. Fingers Club Mix)	7:59

== Personnel ==
Credits adapted from the liner notes of Return to Paradise.

- John Fields – mixing
- Jesse Rogg – writing, mixing, production
- Sam Sparro – vocals, writing, co-production, additional synths
- Dave Wilder – bass
- Charlie Willcocks – writing, piano, synths

== Chart performance ==
Chart (2012)	position
Belgium (Ultratop 50 Flanders)	1
Belgium (Ultratop Airplay Flanders)	1
Belgium (Ultratop Dance Flanders)	1
Belgium (Ultratop Dance Bubbling Under Flanders)	4
Belgium (Ultratop 50 Wallonia)	1
Belgium (Ultratop Airplay Wallonia)	1
Belgium (Ultratop Dance Wallonia)	1
Belgium (Ultratop Dance Bubbling Under Wallonia)	13
Italy (FIMI)	16
Netherlands (Single Top 100)	70
Poland (Polish Airplay Top 100)	3

== Certifications ==
Certifications for "Happiness"
Region	Certification	Certified units/sales
Belgium (BRMA)	Platinum	30,000^{*}
^{*} Sales figures based on certification alone.

== Release history ==
Region	Date	Format	Label
Belgium	17 February 2012	Digital download – Single	EMI
Belgium	23 March 2012	Digital download – Remixes	EMI
