= Les Gordon =

- Born: Marc Mifune; Rennes, France
- Genres: Electronic
- Years active: 2013-present
- Label: Arista

Marc Mifune (born in Rennes, France), whose stage name is Les Gordon, is a French electronic musician and songwriter.

== Early life ==
Gordon went to the École des Beaux-Arts. Originally from Rennes, he studied at the École Émile-Cohl in Lyon. His father is Taiwanese and his stage name comes from the Scottish artist Douglas Gordon. He notably studied cello and guitar.

== Career ==
Mifune began creating his first tracks under the pseudonym Morning Crash, when he began learning how to make computer-aided music. His current stage name, Les Gordon, is a reference to Douglas Gordon, videographer and visual artist; "Les" is an English name that references British artists such as Four Tet, Gold Panda, Mount Kimbie and many others.

Mifune has been an opening act for Stromae (Rencontres Trans Musicales of 2013), Madeon (Le Trianon) and Fauve (eighteen representations).

He composed Saisons (2014), Les cheveux longs (2015) and Atlas (2016), along with a collaboration EP, Croquis n°1 (2015). and signed to the French label Kitsuné after leaving the label Allo Floride.

He has a band, which is called Singapour (2015), where Gordon is a producer and his friend Roman Oswald writes lyrics.

He is featured in several duos such as Mondrian with Roman Oswald and Leska with Douchka.

Nearly in 2018, Mifune was signed to French subdivision of Sony Music's record label Arista Records.

In the same year, he released his long-play album La. This album included song Flirting With June, that was used in Apple's September Event 2019 intro and advertisement Wonderful tools.

== Albums ==
- White Land (25 August 2013)
- Diadème (3 March 2014)
- Françoise // Brigitte (20 June 2014)
- Atlas (11 December 2016)
- La (29 June 2018)
