= In for the Kill (song) =

2009 single by La Roux

Single by La Roux

from the album La Roux
- Released: 15 March 2009
- Studio: Elfin (Teddington, London)
- Genre: Synth-pop
- Length: 4:08
- Label: Polydor
- Songwriters: Elly Jackson; Ben Langmaid
- Producers: Ben Langmaid; Elly Jackson

La Roux singles chronology
"Quicksand" (2008)	"In for the Kill" (2009)	"Bulletproof" (2009)

Audio sample
- file; help

Music video
- "In for the Kill" on YouTube; "In for the Kill" (US version) on YouTube

"In for the Kill" is a song by English synth-pop duo La Roux from their eponymous debut studio album (2009). The song was released as the album's second single on 15 March 2009. It became the duo's breakthrough single, peaking at number two on the UK Singles Chart. Dubstep producers Skream and Skrillex both made remixes of the track. In 2011, "In for the Kill" was nominated for Best Dance Recording at the 53rd Annual Grammy Awards.

== Background ==
Frontwoman Elly Jackson told Steve Harris of Xfm radio that the song is "about telling someone how you feel regardless of what you get back, and not waiting to find out if they want you or not."

The title was inspired by a newspaper article about the rock band The Killers. Jackson told BBC Radio 6Music that she saw the title as a headline in The Guardian which her mother had left for her on her bedroom floor.

The track is heavily influenced by the title theme of the 1980s animated television series Pole Position, with the music video paying homage to the show as well.

== Critical reception ==
"In for the Kill" received generally positive reviews from music critics. Digital Spy reviewer David Balls described the song as "slightly odd, endlessly exciting" and stated that it "manages to sound quaintly old-school and positively futuristic all at the same time." Francis Jolley of Clickmusic praised it as "80s synth pop at its most glorious", naming it "the most exciting single around." In a review for Exclaim!, Cam Lindsay wrote that the track "features some icy, high-pitched woos from Jackson and pulse-pounding beats" which make it sound "delicious". MSN Music called it a "damn fine electro pop humdinger" and complimented Jackson's powerful vocals which "hit the ground running and burst with effervescence from the opening note."

In October 2011, NME placed the song at number 64 on its list of the "150 Best Tracks of the Past 15 Years".

== Commercial performance ==
"In for the Kill" debuted at number 11 on the UK Singles Chart for the week ending 28 March 2009. Four weeks after its debut, the song peaked at number two with 51,724 copies sold. The single spent four consecutive weeks at number two, before falling to number three with sales of 44,310 copies. In January 2011, "In for the Kill" was named the 11th best-selling download in the United Kingdom of all time. The song had sold 875,523 copies in the UK as of July 2014. In Ireland, the track debuted at number 47 on 16 April 2009 and peaked at number 13, four weeks later.

"In for the Kill" was less successful in continental Europe, charting at number 43 in Belgium, number 53 in Austria, number 68 in Slovakia and number 92 in Germany. It nevertheless reached number 11 in Norway, as well as number nine on the European Hot 100 Singles chart. The single debuted at number 50 in Australia on 29 June 2009, but fell off the chart the next week. On 13 July 2009 it re-entered the chart at number 46, peaking at number 36, two weeks later. In the United States, "In for the Kill" topped the Hot Dance Club Songs chart on the issue dated 27 November 2010, becoming the duo's second number-one song on the chart after "Bulletproof".

== Music videos ==
The first music video for "In for the Kill" was directed by Kinga Burza and produced by Sarah Tognazzi. The 1980s-inspired video features Jackson singing the song while driving a Toyota MR2. It begins with Jackson driving down a dark road at night. At the beginning of the chorus, she puts on a pair of sunglasses, removing them at the chorus' end. During the instrumental section of the song, she waves her hand out of the car window, at which point the road ahead and the cloud-covered moon is visible. Jackson continues to drive until she comes across another version of herself standing in the middle of the road. The video concludes with Jackson driving the car, her eyes glowing white.

A second video was released on 7 October 2010 to promote the US release of the single, featuring a slightly altered version of the song. The video was directed by LEGS and filmed at the Hotel Chelsea in New York City.

== Alternative versions ==
Dubstep musician Skream produced the most well-known remix of the song, titled the Let's Get Ravey remix, which was included on the CD single and digital EP. The remix was featured during the closing credits of the Entourage episode "Hair", originally aired 8 August 2010, as well as in television commercials for the 2009 fantasy video game Bayonetta and in the trailer for the 2012 film Dredd. It is also part of the soundtrack to Matchstick Productions' 2011 ski film Attack of la Niña.

Skream's remix received positive reviews from music critics. The Observer reviewer Gareth Grundy called it a "proper remix, the kind that nudges the original song into thrilling new territory." Cam Lindsay of Exclaim! wrote that while the original version "features some icy, high-pitched wails from Jackson and pulse-pounding beats [...] it's the 'Let's Get Ravey Mix' [...] that really kills it." Skream also produced an alternate remix, That Doesn't Sound Like Skream's Remix, which appeared on the physical and digital EP releases of "In for the Kill".

French musician Lifelike's self-titled remix, which is over six minutes long, was released as a 12-inch single and digital download by French electronic music label Kitsuné, and it was also included on the 2009 compilation album Kitsuné Maison Compilation 7. The official remix of the song for the US featuring rapper Kanye West premiered exclusively on the Entertainment Weekly website on 12 October 2010, and was released digitally on 2 November.

== Cover versions ==
The song was covered on the Live Lounge segment of BBC Radio 1's The Jo Whiley Show on four separate occasions: on 18 May 2009 by Australian R&B singer Daniel Merriweather, on 30 January 2010 by Swedish indie pop trio Miike Snow, on 12 May 2010 by American R&B singer Kelis, on 8 September 2013 by English indie pop trio London Grammar and by Billie Marten.

"In for the Kill" has been sampled by several rappers. Atlanta rapper Donnis sampled it on his song "For the Kill" from his 2010 mixtape Fashionably Late. Later that year, it was sampled on French Montana's song "Goin' In for the Kill" featuring Chinx Drugz and Cheeze, which appears on French Montana's mixtape Coke Boys. The track was sampled by production duo Cool & Dre for rapper Game's "The Kill" from his 2011 mixtape Purp & Patron. In April 2011, Jackson confirmed that Dr. Dre had sampled "In for the Kill" for his upcoming album Detox. UK drill rapper Tion Wayne sampled the song's chorus in his 2022 single "IFTK", with La Roux also listed as a lead artist; it reached a peak of number 6 on the UK Singles Chart.

== Track listings ==
- CD single
1. "In for the Kill" – 4:08
2. "In for the Kill" (Skream's Let's Get Ravey Remix) – 5:05
- Digital EP
1. "In for the Kill" – 4:10
2. "In for the Kill" (Skream's Let's Get Ravey Remix) – 5:04
3. "In for the Kill" (That Doesn't Sound Like Skream's Remix) – 3:27
- UK limited edition 7-inch picture disc

A. "In for the Kill" – 4:08
B. "In for the Kill" – 4:08

- French digital single and 12-inch single
1. "In for the Kill" (Lifelike Remix) – 6:08
- French and Japanese EP
1. "In for the Kill" – 4:10
2. "Quicksand" – 3:06
3. "In for the Kill" (Lifelike Remix) – 6:09
4. "In for the Kill" (That Doesn't Sound Like Skream's Remix) – 3:26
5. "Quicksand" (autoKratz Drags to Riches Remix) – 4:40
6. "Quicksand" (Beni's Sinking at 1.56 Mix) – 4:16
7. "In for the Kill" (Skream's Lets Get Ravey Remix) – 5:03
- US digital EP – remixes
1. "In for the Kill" (Skream's Let's Get Ravey Remix) – 5:01
2. "In for the Kill" (Tim Bran Remix) – 3:43
3. "In for the Kill" (Danger's Ocean Remix) – 4:16
4. "In for the Kill" (Skrillex Remix) – 5:11
- US digital single – featuring Kanye West
1. "In for the Kill" (featuring Kanye West) – 4:40

== Credits and personnel ==
Credits adapted from the liner notes of La Roux.

=== Recording ===
- Recorded at Elfin Studios (Teddington, London)
- Mixed at MixStar Studios (Virginia Beach, Virginia)

=== Personnel ===
- Elly Jackson – vocals, production
- Ben Langmaid – production
- Serban Ghenea – mixing
- John Hanes – mix engineering
- Tim Roberts – mix engineering assistance

== Charts ==
=== Weekly charts ===
2009–2010 weekly chart performance for "In for the Kill"
Chart (2009–2010)	Peak position
Australia (ARIA)	36
Australian Dance (ARIA)	5
Austria (Ö3 Austria Top 40)	53
Belgium (Ultratop 50 Flanders)	43
Europe (European Hot 100 Singles)	9
Germany (GfK)	92
Ireland (IRMA)	13
Norway (VG-lista)	11
Scottish Singles Sales (Official Charts)	10
Slovakia Airplay (ČNS IFPI)	68
UK Singles (Official Charts)	2
US Dance Club Songs (Billboard)	1
US Dance Singles Sales (Billboard)	6

2026 weekly chart performance for "In for the Kill"
Chart (2026)	Peak position
Israel International Airplay (Media Forest)	11

=== Year-end charts ===
Year-end chart performance for "In for the Kill"
Chart (2009)	Position
Australian Dance (ARIA)	18
UK Singles (OCC)	6

=== Decade-end charts ===
Decade-end chart performance for "In for the Kill"
Chart (2000–2009)	Position
UK Singles (OCC)	35

== Certifications ==
Certifications for "In for the Kill"
Region	Certification	Certified units/sales
Australia (ARIA)	Platinum	70,000^{^}
New Zealand (RMNZ)	Platinum	30,000^{‡}
United Kingdom (BPI)	2× Platinum	1,200,000^{‡}
^{^} Shipments figures based on certification alone.^{‡} Sales+streaming figures based on certification alone.

== Release history ==
Release dates and formats for "In for the Kill"
Region	Date	Format	Label	Ref(s)
United Kingdom	15 March 2009	Digital EP	Polydor	
United Kingdom	16 March 2009	CD single; 7-inch single	Polydor	
France	20 April 2009	Digital download; 12-inch single; EP	Kitsuné	
Germany	8 May 2009	Digital EP	Universal	
Japan	20 May 2009	EP	P-Vine; Kitsuné	
Australia	5 June 2009	Digital EP	Universal	
Germany	12 June 2009	CD single	Universal	
United States	14 September 2010	Digital EP – remixes	Cherrytree; Interscope	
United States	2 November 2010	Digital single – featuring Kanye West	Cherrytree; Interscope	

== See also ==
- List of number-one dance singles of 2010 (U.S.)
