= Black and Gold =

2008 single by Sam Sparro

Single by Sam Sparro

from the album Sam Sparro
- B-side: "S.A.M.S.P.A.R.R.O."
- Released: 31 March 2008
- Genre: Pop
- Length: 4:37 (album version); 3:32 (single version)
- Label: Island; Modus Vivendi
- Songwriters: Sam Falson; Jesse Rogg
- Producers: Jesse Rogg; Sam Falson

Sam Sparro singles chronology
"Cottonmouth" (2007)	"Black and Gold" (2008)	"21st Century Life" (2008)

"Black and Gold" is the lead single from Australian singer Sam Sparro's eponymous debut album. The song was written by Sparro (as Sam Falson) and Jesse Rogg. It has been remixed by Max Sanna and Steve Pitron, Paul Epworth, Al Usher, Kings of the Universe, Kromatik and Russ Chimes. The original version of the single was made available online on 31 March 2008. On 7 April, the CD, 12-inch, and limited edition 7-inch singles were released.

"Black and Gold" explores the relationship between reason, spirituality and love. It was a commercial success upon release, reaching number two in the United Kingdom, number four in Australia, and number five in Ireland and Turkey. It was also a top-20 hit in Denmark, Flanders, Italy, and New Zealand. The song was nominated for Best Dance Recording at the 2009 Grammy Awards.

== Background ==
"Black and Gold" originally appeared on the Modus Vivendi Music Vol.2 compilation album, released in 2007, along with an alternate mix of the song "Sally" and Sparro's remix of "Young Lovers", by another Modus Vivendi artist, Love Grenades. Modus Vivendi Music released an EP entitled Black + Gold, featuring the song, in the autumn of 2007, which garnered the attention that led to the deal with Island UK. All songs from that EP, excluding "Miss Rexi", appear in new revisions on Sparro's debut eponymous studio album, released with Island UK in May 2008. In a video interview, Sparro confirmed that the song's subject is his religious faith, saying "It is about God, yeah. [...] I do like to have faith in something that is bigger than me."

== Release ==
"Black and Gold" was made available as a digital download on 31 March 2008 as the lead single from Sam Sparro. It was released by Island UK Records through a licensing deal with independent Los Angeles based label, Modus Vivendi Music, owned and operated by Jesse Rogg, who also produced and co-wrote the song with Sparro.

== Reception ==
The song was nominated for the 2009 Grammy Award for "Best Dance Recording". It received three nominations for the 2008 ARIA Awards in the categories for "Breakthrough Artist – Single", "Best Pop Release" and "Single of the Year". The song has been certified gold in both Australia and the UK.

== Music video ==
Sam Sparro dancing with his look-a-likes, from the second music video for "Black and Gold".

There were two music videos produced for "Black and Gold". The first was directed by Mariah Garnett. Sparro appears dressed in black, white, and gold clothing, singing alone, cut between city views, shots of urban streets filmed from moving cars, and reverse action shots of gold coloured drinking glasses shattering against a black back drop. The video had a significantly low budget, and was later scrapped after Sparro's deal with Island Records.

The second music video was directed by AlexandLiane, funded through Sparro's new contract. The music video depicts Sparro emerging from a Limousine with many copies of himself in an underground garage. The garage, illuminated by chains of lights, pulsating as Sparro and his copies dance, donning tuxedos decorated with lights. The video has a colour theme of black and gold after the title, a theme reminiscent of the first video. It was released in February 2008. This video, directed by AlexandLiane, received a nomination for "Best Dance Video" at the 2009 MTV Australia Awards.

== Awards and nominations ==
ARIA Music Awards

Year	Nominee / work	Award	Result
2008	"Black and Gold"	Breakthrough Artist – Single	Nominated
2008	"Black and Gold"	Best Pop Release	Nominated
2008	"Black and Gold"	Single of the Year	Nominated

Grammy Awards

Year	Nominee / work	Award	Result
2009	"Black and Gold"	Best Dance Recording	Nominated

MTV Australia Awards

Year	Nominee / work	Award	Result
2009	"Black and Gold"	Best Dance Video	Nominated

== Track listings ==
UK CD single

1. "Black and Gold" (radio edit) – 3:30
2. "S.A.M.S.P.A.R.R.O." – 2:32

German CD single

1. "Black and Gold" (radio edit) – 3:30
2. "Black and Gold" (Phones Hard as Diamond) – 5:02
3. "Black and Gold" (Al Usher mix) – 4:35
4. "Black and Gold" (video) – 3:39

12-inch single

1. "Black and Gold" (Max Sanna & Steve Pitron mix) – 8:33
2. "Black and Gold" (Al Usher remix) – 8:15
3. "Black and Gold" (Phones Hard as Diamond mix – dub) – 6:32

== Personnel ==
Personnel are adapted from the liner notes of Sam Sparro.

- Richard Edgeler – assistance
- Jesse Rogg – writing, mixing, production
- Sam Sparro – vocals, keyboards, writing, production
- Mark Rankin – drum programming
- Brio Taliaferro – additional programming
- Jeremy Wheatley – mixing

== Charts ==
=== Weekly charts ===
Chart (2008)	Peak position
Australia (ARIA)	4
Austria (Ö3 Austria Top 40)	50
Belgium (Ultratop 50 Flanders)	15
Belgium (Ultratop 50 Wallonia)	36
Czech Republic Airplay (ČNS IFPI)	32
Denmark (Tracklisten)	10
Europe (Eurochart Hot 100)	5
Germany (GfK)	40
Hungary (Editors' Choice Top 40)	11
Ireland (IRMA)	5
Italy (FIMI)	19
Netherlands (Dutch Top 40)	29
Netherlands (Single Top 100)	47
New Zealand (Recorded Music NZ)	12
Scottish Singles Sales (Official Charts)	1
Slovakia Airplay (ČNS IFPI)	32
Turkey (Billboard)	5
UK Singles (Official Charts)	2
UK Dance (Official Charts)	6
US Dance Club Songs (Billboard)	12
US Dance Airplay (Billboard)	8

Chart (2010)	Peak position
UK Dance (Official Charts)	29

=== Year-end charts ===
Chart (2008)	Position
Australia (ARIA)	19
Australian Artists (ARIA)	3
Australian Dance (ARIA)	3
Australian Digital Tracks (ARIA)	45
Belgium (Ultratop 50 Flanders)	72
Europe (Eurochart Hot 100)	40
UK Singles (OCC)	10

=== Decade-end charts ===
Chart (2000–2009)	Position
UK Singles (OCC)	91

== Certifications ==
Certifications for "Black & Gold"
Region	Certification	Certified units/sales
Australia (ARIA)	Gold	35,000^{^}
Italy (FIMI)	Gold	10,000^{*}
New Zealand (RMNZ)	Platinum	30,000^{‡}
United Kingdom (BPI)	2× Platinum	1,200,000^{‡}
^{*} Sales figures based on certification alone.^{^} Shipments figures based on certification alone.^{‡} Sales+streaming figures based on certification alone.

== Release history ==
Region	Date	Format(s)	Label(s)	Ref.
United Kingdom	31 March 2008	Digital download	Island; Modus Vivendi	
United Kingdom	7 April 2008	7-inch vinyl; 12-inch vinyl; CD	Island; Modus Vivendi	
Australia	12 May 2008	CD	Island; Modus Vivendi; Universal Music Australia	

== Covers and samplings ==
British singer Adele performed an acoustic cover of the song for her appearance on a 2008 Live Lounge episode. The song was later sampled by British rock band Coldplay on "People of the Pride", a track from their 2021 album Music of the Spheres. Katy Perry & Ellie Goulding have also covered it, earlier in their careers.
