= Pocket (Sam Sparro song) =

Single by Sam Sparro

from the album Sam Sparro
- B-side: "Gypsy Woman (She's Homeless)"
- Released: 13 December 2008
- Genre: Disco-pop
- Length: 4:46 (Album version); 3:39 (Radio Edit)
- Label: Island; EMI
- Songwriter(s): Sam Falson; Paul Epworth
- Producer(s): Paul Epworth

Sam Sparro singles chronology
"21st Century Life" (2008)	"Pocket" (2008)	"Feelings Gone" (2009)

"Pocket" is the 3rd single from Sam Sparro's eponymous debut album, released in 2008.

== Release Information ==
"Pocket" was first played on Australian radio in November 2008. It was released onto the Australian iTunes Store on December 13 of the same year. The download consists of the song "Pocket" and the B-Side, "Gypsy Woman (She's Homeless)", a cover of Crystal Waters 1991 hit. "Pocket" was originally intended to be released as an international single, but its release was halted abruptly after only having been released in Australia.

== Track listing ==
Digital download

1. "Pocket" – 3:39
2. "Gypsy Woman (She's Homeless)" – 3:28

== Personnel ==
Credits adapted from the liner notes of Sam Sparro.

- Paul Epworth - writing, production
- Sam Falson – vocals, writing
- Dan Grech-Marugerat – mixing

== Charts ==
The single has peaked at #33 on the Australia Airplay Chart.

Chart (2008)	Peak Position
Australia Airplay Chart	33
