= Sean DeLear =

American musician

- Born: Anthony Robertson; 1964
- Died: September 5, 2017 (aged 53); Vienna, Austria
- Occupations: Musician, artist

Sean DeLear (1964 – September 5, 2017) was a member of the “Silver Lake scene” of postpunk and powerpop artists and musicians living in Los Angeles's in the 1980s and 1990s. They were the lead singer of the band Glue.

== Work ==
DeLear was a collaborator with performance-based artists such as Vaginal Davis, Brian Grillo, and Kembra Pfahler. Later, DeLear was in the art collective Gelitin and performed as a solo cabaret artist in Sean DeLear on the Rocks.

They were a cultural boundary breaker and transcended sexuality, race, age, genres, and scenes.

In 2022, Semiotext(e) published, I Could Not Believe It, The 1979 Teenage Diaries of Sean DeLear by Sean DeLear. The book chronicles the early years of his burgeoning queerness and punk community in California, notably becoming a pioneer members of the “Silver Lake scene” of post-punk and power pop and one of the few black artist in the scene during that time. The book includes an introduction by writer and artist Brontez Purnell and was co-edited by writer and editor Michael Bullock and Cesar Padilla.

A reading for the book was held at the Poetry Project Fall of 2023 and featured readers like Xander Aviance, Kyle Carrero Lopez, Anne Hanavan, K8 Hardy, Juliana Huxtable, Kembra Pfahler, and Journey Streams.

The Life of Sean DeLear, a documentary film about DeLear by Markus Zizenbacher, premiered at the Frameline Film Festival in 2024.

== Publications ==
- I Could Not Believe It: The 1979 Teenage Diaries of Sean DeLear, Sean DeLear, Introduction by Brontez Purnell, Edited by Michael Bullock and Cesar Padilla (Semiotext(e), 2023)
