= HeartsRevolution =

American band

HEARTSREVOLUTION
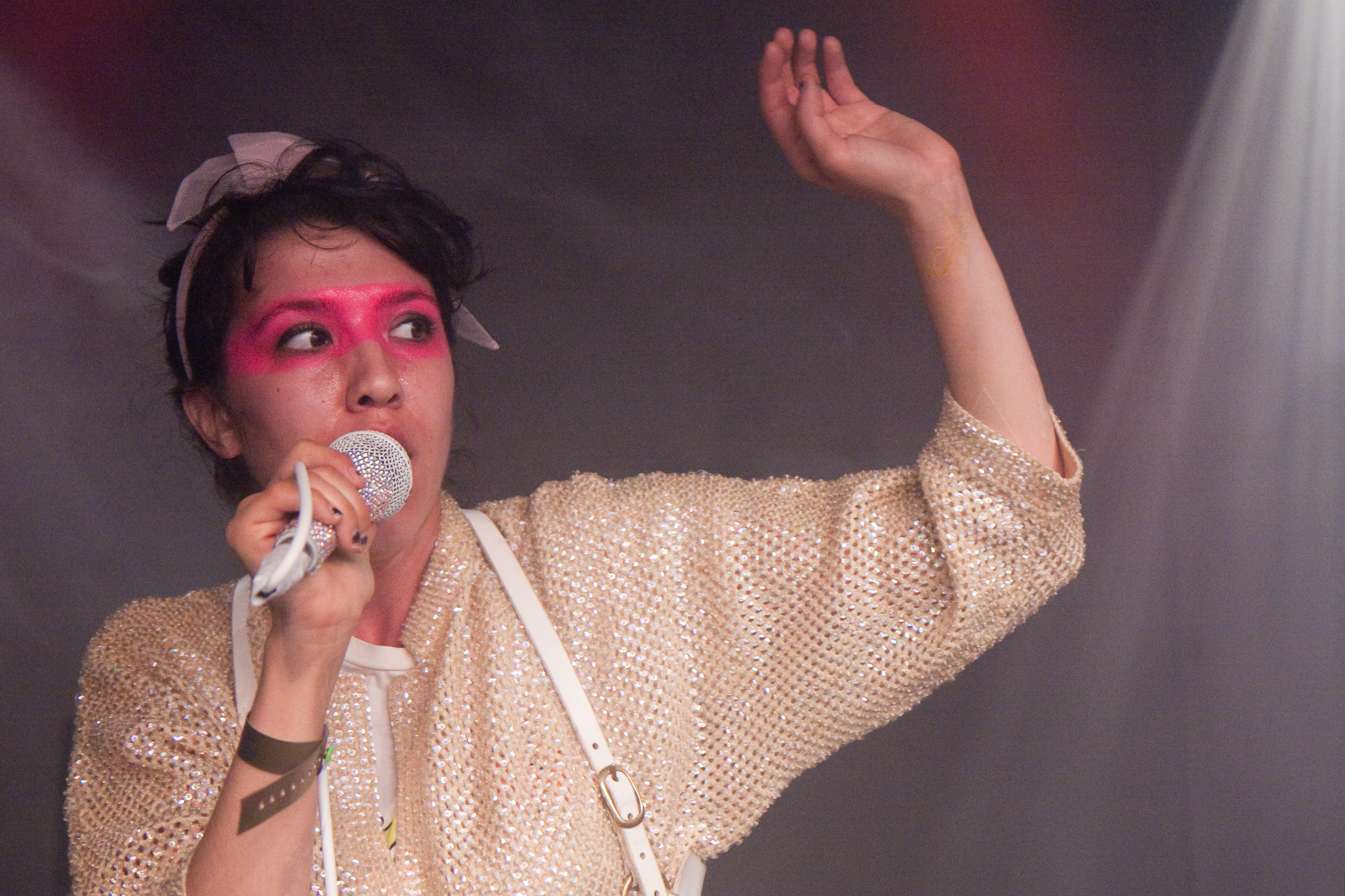
- HeartsRevolution at SXSW 2014.

Background information
- Origin: New York, U.S.
- Genres: Electronica, noise, dance-punk, electropunk, new rave
- Years active: 2004–present
- Labels: Owsla; Kitsuné
- Members: Ben Pollock - synthesizers Leyla 'Lo' Safai - vocals Prince Terrence - live drums

HEARTSREVOLUTION is a New York-based band, described by NME as "the model for the modern pop group." The band consists of Ben Pollock and Leyla 'Lo' Safai, joined for live performances by drummer Terry 'Prince Terrence' Campbell, who has also performed with post-hardcore bands Christiansen and Your Highness Electric, as well as Santigold and Spank Rock.

The band was featured in NME's 'Future 50,' a list of 'the innovators pushing music forward,' in 2008 at number 36. The band relies on unusual modes of transport to all of their concerts and in April 2008 mounted an ice cream truck for their first tour of the UK.

They have so far released a 12" called Ultraviolence, an EP entitled Switchblade, a split 6" along with Crystal Castles and another EP, C.Y.O.A. 12". Their song "Dance Till Dawn" was featured on The CW show Gossip Girl. Their debut album Ride or Die was released by Skrillex’s Owsla label on April 15, 2014. Since 2014, there were no new albums nor singles released.

== History ==
=== Formation ===
The group formed in 2005, when Lo asked Ben to compose a soundtrack for the first HEARTSREVOLUTION ice cream truck. Their name comes from a Huggy Bear song called "Her Jazz” which referenced boy/grrrl revolutionaries.

=== Ride or Die (2014) ===
Ride or Die explores the bands dichotomy of childlike innocence and visceral revolutionary spirit. Drawing from Lo's riot grrrl past, the album also serves as a platform for her often political lyrics.

== Truck ==
The HEARTSREVOLUTION Ice Cream Truck was anointed "Best Band Vehicle" by Rolling Stone.

"Before a gig, New York dance duo Heartsrevolution sold merch and popsicles from a repurposed ice cream van. What made that van extraordinary: every inch was covered with Swarovski crystals, which, according to singer Leyla Safai, took the band two-and-a-half years to affix. They would have run out, she explained, if not for the death of Michael Jackson: He had requisitioned a large number of crystals for his tour, and after he died, those crystals were passed on to them."

== Band members ==
- Leyla 'Lo' Safai - vocals
- Ben Pollock - guitar, keyboards

=== Touring member ===
- Terry 'Prince Terrence' Campbell - drums

== Discography ==
=== Albums ===
- Ride or Die (2014)

=== EPs ===
- CYOA! (2007)
- Switchblade EP (2008)
- Hearts Japan EP (2009)
- Ride or Die EP (2013)
- Revolution Rising (2017)

=== Mixtapes ===
- Are We Having Fun Yet? (2011)
- Revolution Rising (2013)

=== Singles ===
- Ultraviolence (2008)
- Switchblade (2008)
- Pop Heart (2013)
- $EX (2013)
- KISS (2014)
- Ride or Die (2014)
