= Droid Bishop =

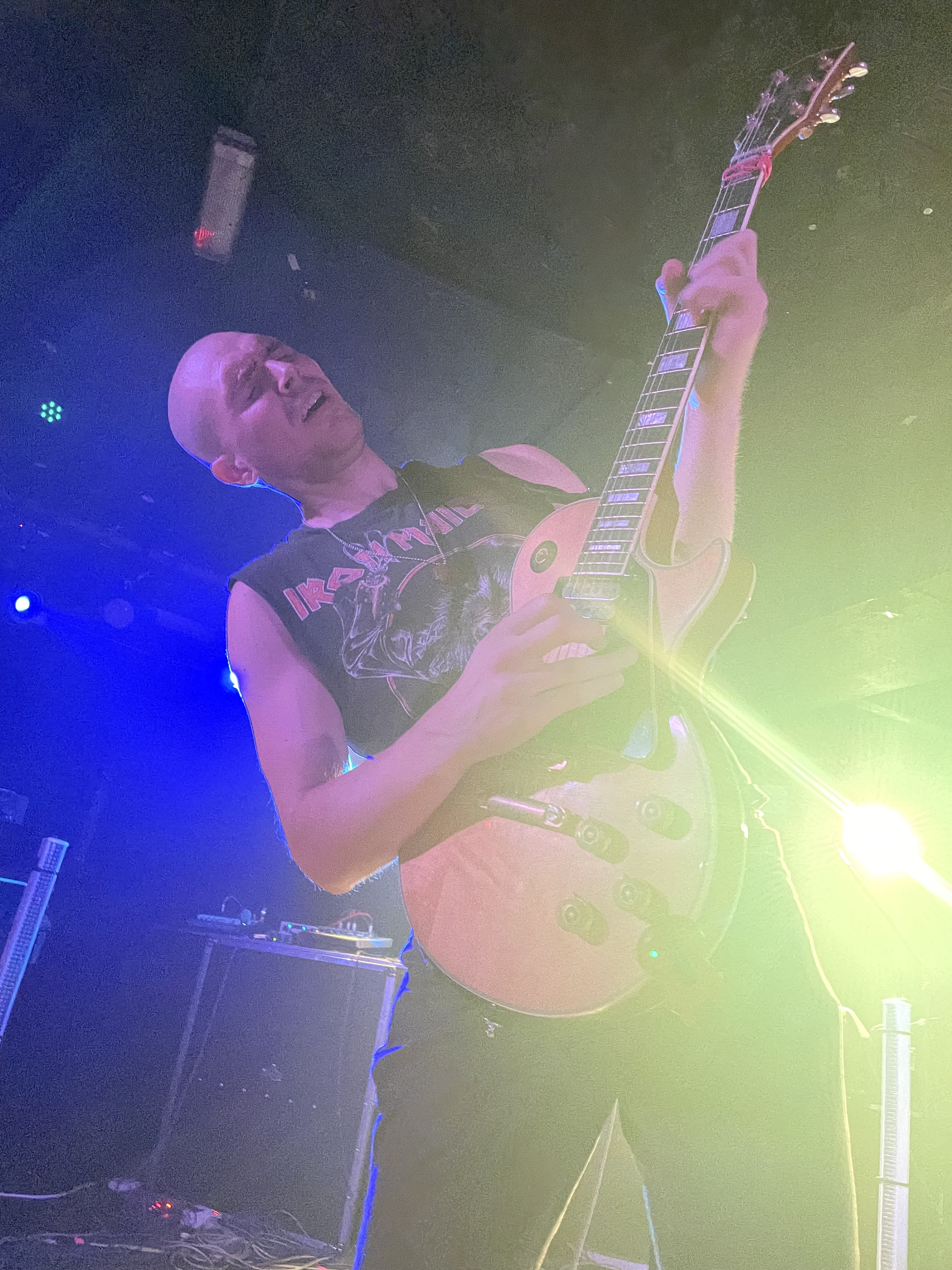
- Droid Bishop playing in Camden, London, November 2022

Background information
- Born: James Bowen; 1 December 1985 (age 40); Australia
- Genres: Synthwave, synthpop
- Occupations: Musician, keyboardist, songwriter
- Instruments: Synthesizer, guitar, vocals
- Website: droidbishop.bandcamp.com droidbishop.com

James Bowen, known professionally as Droid Bishop, is an Australian synthwave artist, guitarist, keyboardist and songwriter. According to Bowen himself, his artistic name is a reference to the Aliens movie character Bishop. Bowen is the brother of musician Sam Sparro.

== Discography ==
- Electric Love (2013)
- The Irrelevance of Space & Time (2013)
- Beyond The Blue (2014)
- Lost in Symmetry (2016)
- End of Aquarius (2017)
- Rebirth of the Machine (2019)
- Music (2020)
- Into the Abstract (2021)
- Nights (2022)
- Cinema (2024)
