= Sam Sparro (album) =

Studio album by Sam Sparro
- Released: 28 April 2008
- Recorded: 2007–2008
- Genre: Electrofunk; R&B; synthpop
- Label: Island Records; Modus Vivendi
- Producer: Sam Sparro; Jesse Rogg; Paul Epworth; Eg White; Richard X

Sam Sparro chronology
Sam Sparro (2008)	Return to Paradise (2012)

Singles from Sam Sparro
- 1. "Cottonmouth" Released: 10 June 2007; 2. "Black and Gold" Released: 4 April 2008; 3. "Too Many Questions" Released: 21 June 2008 (NZ); 4. "21st Century Life" Released: 21 July 2008; 5. "Pocket" Released: 13 December 2008 (AUS)

Professional ratings
Review scores
Source	Rating
AllMusic	3/5 stars
101 Albums	4/5 stars
Digital Spy	3/5 stars
Drowned in Sound	7/10 stars
NME	6/10 stars
This Is Fake DIY	6/10 stars

Sam Sparro is the debut studio album by Australian recording artist Sam Sparro. It was released in the UK on 28 April 2008, after the success of Sparro's debut single, "Black and Gold", which peaked at number two on the UK Singles Chart. The album debuted at number five during its first week of release in the UK, and moved up one spot to number four, its current peak, in its second week of release. In September 2008 the nominees for the 2008 ARIA Awards with the album receiving two nominations including Best Male Artist and Breakthrough Artist – Album.

== Singles ==
1. "Cottonmouth" was Sparro's first single from the album, released one year before the album, on 10 June 2007.
2. "Black and Gold" was the second single from the album, meant to act as a lead single for the album's release soon thereafter. The song went on to become a hit in the U.K., as well as in several other countries worldwide. It entered the UK Singles Chart at #23 and went on to peak at #2 for three non-consecutive weeks. The song also went on the peak at #4 in both Australia and Norway, #5 in Ireland, Europe, and Turkey, and #8 on the US Billboard Dance Charts.
3. "Too Many Questions" was released in New Zealand, to the country's iTunes store on 21 June 2008. It is unclear if the song was ever supposed to have been an international release or not, but if it was to have been, its release was cancelled.
4. "21st Century Life" was the third single from the album to be released internationally (fourth single in New Zealand). It was not as successful as "Black and Gold", however, it peaked just outside the top 40 at #42 in Australia, and at #44 in the UK.
5. "Pocket" was the fourth single (fifth single in New Zealand), as announced in an interview with Popjustice, but its release was halted before it could reach the UK or US. However, it peaked at #33 on the Australian Airplay Chart. "Pocket" was released to iTunes in Australia on 13 December 2008.

== Track listing ==
No.	Title	Writer(s)	Producer(s)	Length
1.	"Too Many Questions"	Sam Sparro, Jesse Rogg	Richard X, Rogg	3:56
2.	"Black and Gold"	Sparro, Rogg	Rogg, Sparro	4:35
3.	"21st Century Life" (featuring the Sweet & Sour Horns)	Sparro, Rogg	Rogg, Paul Epworth	4:21
4.	"Sick"	Sparro, Rogg	Rogg, Sparro	4:08
5.	"Waiting for Time"	Sparro, Eg White	White	3:32
6.	"Recycle It!"	Sparro	Rogg	1:17
7.	"Cottonmouth" (featuring the Sweet & Sour Horns)	Sparro, Rogg	Rogg, Sparro	3:37
8.	"Hot Mess"	Sparro, White	White	3:01
9.	"Pocket"	Sparro, Epworth	Epworth	4:45
10.	"Cut Me Loose"	Sparro, Rogg	Rogg, Sparro, Epworth^{[a]}	3:54
11.	"Sally"	Sparro, Rogg	Richard X, Rogg, Sparro	3:59
12.	"Clingwrap" (featuring the Sweet & Sour Horns) (track not included on various European editions of the album but is a standard track on original UK/AUS release)	Sparro, Rogg	Rogg, Sparro	4:01
13.	"Can't Stop This" (features the hidden track "Still Hungry" which starts eight minutes in)	Sparro, Epworth	Epworth, Rogg^{[a]}	5:00/12:28
Total length:				57:34

US version
No.	Title	Writer(s)	Length
1.	"S.A.M.S.P.A.R.R.O"	Sam Falson	2:33
2.	"Too Many Questions"	Falson, Jesse Rogg	3:56
3.	"Black and Gold"	Falson, Rogg	4:35
4.	"21st Century Life" (featuring the Sweet & Sour Horns)	Falson, Rogg	4:21
5.	"Sick"	Falson, Rogg	4:08
6.	"Waiting for Time"	Falson, Eg White	3:32
7.	"Recycle It!"	Falson	1:17
8.	"Cottonmouth" (featuring the Sweet & Sour Horns)	Falson, Rogg	3:37
9.	"Hot Mess"	Falson, White	3:01
10.	"Pocket"	Falson, Paul Epworth	4:45
11.	"Cut Me Loose"	Falson, Rogg	3:54
12.	"Sally"	Falson, Rogg	3:59
13.	"Clingwrap" (featuring the Sweet & Sour Horns)	Falson, Rogg	4:01
14.	"Still Hungry" (hidden track)		4:28
Total length:			52:07

Japanese version
No.	Title	Writer(s)	Producer(s)	Length
1.	"Too Many Questions"	Sam Sparro, Jesse Rogg		3:56
2.	"Black and Gold"	Sparro, Rogg		4:35
3.	"21st Century Life" (featuring the Sweet & Sour Horns)	Sparro, Rogg		4:21
4.	"Sick"	Sparro, Rogg		4:08
5.	"Waiting for Time"	Sparro, Eg White		3:32
6.	"Recycle It!"	Sparro		1:17
7.	"Cottonmouth" (featuring the Sweet & Sour Horns)	Sparro, Rogg		3:37
8.	"Hot Mess"	Sparro, White		3:01
9.	"Pocket"	Sparro, Paul Epworth		4:45
10.	"Cut Me Loose"	Sparro, Rogg		3:54
11.	"Sally"	Sparro, Rogg		3:59
12.	"Can't Stop This"	Sparro, Epworth		5:03
13.	"Still Hungry" (Japanese bonus track)	Sam Falson		4:26
14.	"S.A.M.S.P.A.R.R.O." (Japanese bonus track)	Falson	Rogg	2:23
15.	"No End in Sight" (Japanese bonus track)	Falson, Rogg	Richard X, Samuel Falson, Rogg	3:55
16.	"Deep Down and Deep" (Japanese bonus track)	Falson, Rogg	Falson, Rogg	3:37
17.	"Black and Gold" (video)			3:40
18.	"21st Century Life" (video)			3:53
Total length:				60:39

Notes

- ^{^a} signifies a co-producer

== Personnel ==
Credits adapted from the liner notes of Sam Sparro.

- Davey Warf Rat Chegwidden – percussion
- Richard Edgeler – mixing assistantance
- Paul Epworth – production
- Chris Falson^{[a]} – guitar
- James Bowen Falson^{[b]} – guitar
- Sam Falson/Sam Sparro – vocals, production, horn arrangements, instrumentation, keyboards
- Adrian Gilliland – original cover photography
- Dan Grech-Marugerat – mixing
- Quetzal Guerrero – violin
- Pete Hofman – mixing
- Alex Hutchinson – layout designing
- Alex Lake – photography
- Stephen Marcussen – mastering
- Mark Rankin – drum programming
- Richard X – production
- Jesse Rogg – production, mixing, engineering, horn arrangements
- Todd M. Simon – engineering, trumpet, flugelhorn, horn arrangements
- Brio Taliaferro – programming
- Tracy Wannomae – alto saxophone, bass clarinet, flute, tenor saxophone
- Jeremy Wheatley – mixing
- Eg White – production, instrumentation
- Charlie Willcocks – piano
- Steven Wilson – illustration

Notes

- ^{^a} signifies person as Sparro's father
- ^{^b} signifies person as Sparro's brother

== Chart performance ==
=== Weekly charts ===
Chart (2008)	Peak position
Australian Albums Chart	23
Austrian Albums Chart	59
Belgium Albums Chart (Flanders)	94
Irish Albums Chart	27
Italian Albums Chart	94
UK Albums Chart	4
US Billboard Dance/Electronic Albums	9
US Billboard Heatseekers Albums	16

=== Year-end charts ===
Chart (2008)	Position
Australian Dance Albums Chart	21

== Certifications ==
Country	Certification	Sales
United Kingdom	Gold	100,000+

== Awards and nominations ==
ARIA Music Awards

Year	Nominee / work	Award	Result
2008	Sam Sparro	Best Male Artist	Nominated
2008	Sam Sparro	Breakthrough Artist – Album	Nominated

== Release history ==
Region	Date
United Kingdom	28 April 2008
Europe	6 June 2008
Australia	7 June 2008
United States	24 June 2008
Canada	24 June 2008
Japan	1 October 2008
