= AutoKratz =

British musical duo

autoKratz
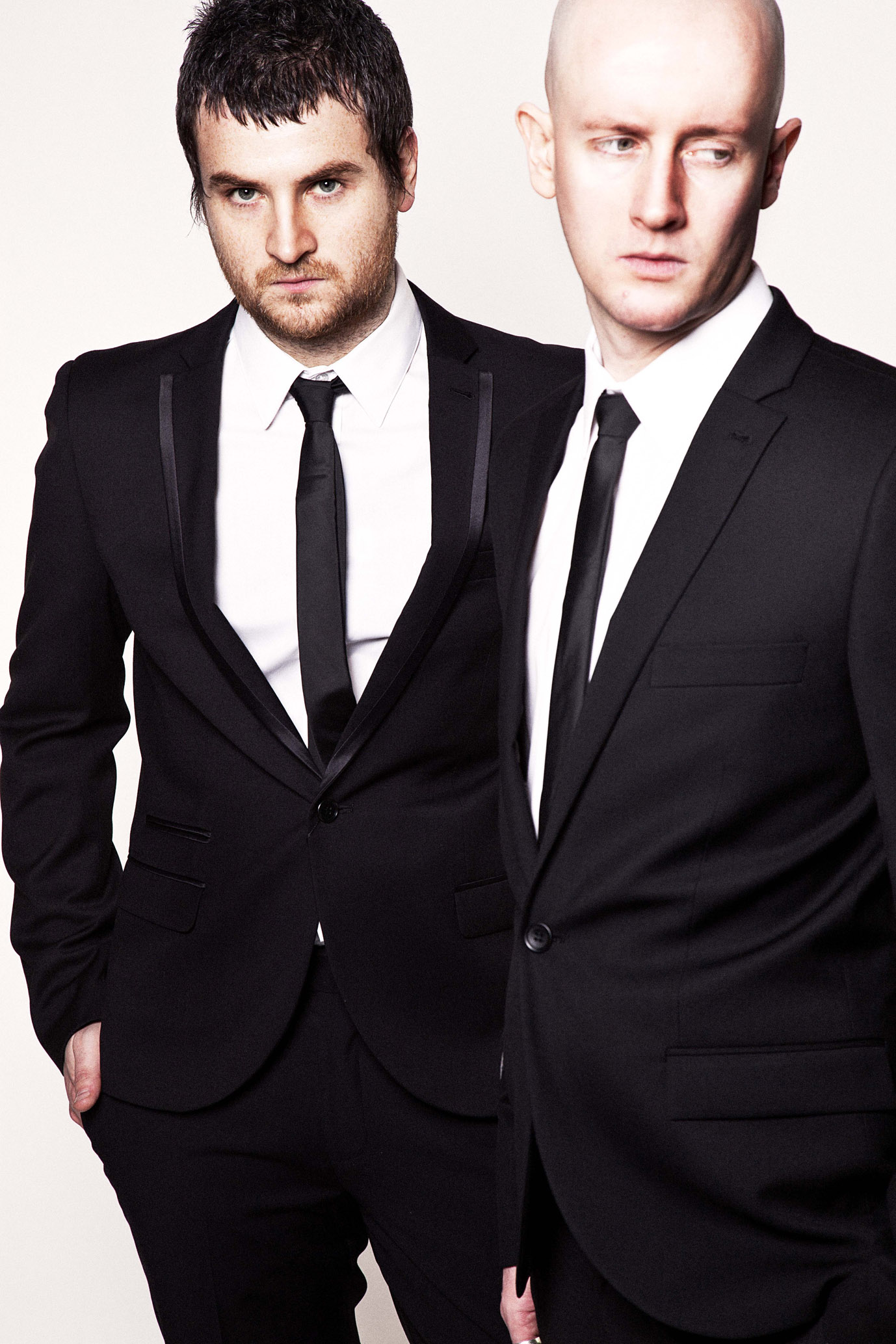
- autoKratz in 2011

Background information
- Origin: London, England
- Genres: Electronic
- Years active: 2008–present
- Labels: Kitsuné Musique, Bad Life
- Members: David Cox; Russell Crank

autoKratz is a London based electronic duo composed of David Cox and Russell Crank. They have released on both French electronic label Kitsuné Musique and their own imprint Bad Life.

== History ==
Formed in London in 2007, autoKratz were quickly signed to the Parisian record label Kitsuné, at a time when the French label was at the forefront of electronic music. Joining an artist roster that includes Hot Chip, Crystal Castles, Simian Mobile Disco and Digitalism.

Their debut single "Reaktor" was premiered as 'Record of the Week' on Pete Tong's show on BBC Radio 1.

== 2008: Down & Out In Paris & London ==
After having released a string of well received singles plus remixes for La Roux, Alex Gopher, Fischerspooner and Underworld, in 2008 they released their debut mini album, Down & Out In Paris & London.

Named after the George Orwell book of the same name as a nod to their adopted hometown and that of their record label, the album received critical acclaim across a wide variety of publications, including the NME. Their single "Stay The Same", reached number 1 in the DJ magazine Hype Chart.

In July 2008, it was reported in the British tabloid Daily Star newspaper and NME that they had become involved in an altercation with Sex Pistols John Lydon, when both were playing at the Live At Loch Lomond event. Lydon is alleged to have demanded autoKratz get out of the car they were in, as he preferred it to the one he was given.

2008 saw them play over 50 dates across Europe including Glastonbury Festival, Summerset Festival in Belgium, culminating in a performance at Rencontres trans musicales.

== 2009: Animal ==
Their first album Animal was released in June 2009, which also received favorable reviews from various publications including IDJ which gave it 10/10, Mixmag (Album of the month), Artrocker, Clash Magazine and the Financial Times.

Underworld asked them to be main support them over two nights at Brixton Academy in November 2008.

Since then, AutoKratz have supported The Prodigy at Makuhari Messe Tokyo and completed their first Australian tour as part of the Park life Festival alongside Empire of the Sun, La Roux, Busy P, A-Trak, Tiga, Erol Alkan and Crystal Castles.

In October 2009, they embark upon a six-week headline tour around Europe in support of their album.

Throughout 2009/2010, they continued to tour across the world, with highlights including La Route du Rock in France, Wireless Festival in London, Open Air Festival in Zurich, Optimus Alive in Portugal, Solidays in France and Melt Festival in Germany.

== 2011: Self Help for Beginners ==
autoKratz's second album Self Help for Beginners was released on 20 June 2011. It received a range of reviews including 4/5 in Q Magazine, who said of the album "Superclub dancefloors are safe in London Duo's hands....dealing in peak time pop nuggets welded to Terminator style-backbones". The first single taken from the album was "Opposite of Love", which premiered on BBC Radio 1 with Jaymo and Andy George.

The album saw the band collaborate with some of their heroes, including New Order bassist Peter Hook, Primal Scream guitarist Andrew Innes, and Primal Scream and Kasabian producer Jagz Kooner.

Peter Hook featured on the second single to come off the album, "Becoming the Wraith", and he joined the band on stage to perform the track at Summer Sonic festival in Tokyo, where they headlined the second stage. On the subject of the collaboration, Hook said "I was delighted to be asked by autoKratz and knowing their music, I understand why. The song was great before I even touched it. "I just put the icing on the cake, so it was a real pleasure."

In late 2011, the autoKratz track "Stay The Same" featured in the motion picture 50/50 with Seth Rogen and Joseph Gordon-Levitt.

With the growing success of their label Bad Life, the latter part of 2011 saw autoKratz return to releasing more club-centric tracks and adopting a sound which combined elements of electro and techno. The autoKratz present Bad Life #1 EP featured tracks "Heart Attack Man" and "Sucker Sirens", and became Mixmag 's 'Electro Tune of the Month' for January 2012. This was followed by "Faith", a collaboration with Lee Mortimer, which also received the Mixmag accolade again for February 2012, as well as becoming DJ Mag's 'Tune of the Month'. Both releases received favourable DJ support worldwide, finding their way into the playlists of Style of Eye and Benny Benassi.

They became part of a burgeoning new scene known as Future Techno and early 2012 also saw the release of autoKratz present Bad Life #2, which cemented the band's intention to continue making progressive electronic music. They also developed a more techno inspired live show for their first Bad Life label tour in Spring 2012.

== Discography ==
=== Studio albums and EPs ===
- Down & Out In Paris & London – EP / Mini album (2008 Kitsuné)
- Animal – Album (2009 Kitsuné)
- Self Help for Beginners – Album (2011 Bad Life)

=== Singles ===
- "reaKtor" – Single / Maxi (2007 Kitsuné Musique)
- "1000 Things" – Single / Maxi (2008 Kitsuné Musique)
- "Pardon Garçon" (rewerk) – Single / Maxi (2008 Kitsuné Musique)
- "Stay the Same" – Single / Maxi (2008 Kitsuné Musique)
- "Stay the Same Remixes" – Single / Maxi (2008 Kitsuné Musique)
- "Always More" – Single / Maxi (2009 Kitsuné Musique)
- "Opposite of Love" – Single / Maxi (2011 Bad Life)
- "Becoming the Wraith" – Single / Maxi (2011 Bad Life)
- "autoKratz present Bad Life#1" – Single / Maxi (2011 Bad Life)
- "Faith" – Single / Maxi (2011 Bad Life)
- "autoKratz present Bad Life#2" – Single / Maxi (2012 Bad Life)
- "Devil's Touch" – Single (2012 Bad Life)
- "Midnight Hearts" – Single (2013 Bad Life)

=== Appears on ===
- Kitsuné Maison Compilation 5 – ("Pardon Garçon") – (2008 Kitsuné Musique)
- Kitsuné Maison Compilation 6 – ("Stay the Same" (Edit)) – (2008 Kitsuné Musique)
- Kitsuné Remixes Album#1 – ("Stay the Same" (Alex Gopher Remix)) – (2009 Kitsuné Musique)
- Kitsuné Maison Compilation 7 – ("Always More" (Yuksek Remix)) – (2009 Kitsuné Musique)
- Kitsuné Remixes Album#2 – ("Always More" (Goshi Goshi Mix)) – (2009 Kitsuné Musique)
