= Sam Sparro =

Australian singer and songwriter (born 1982)

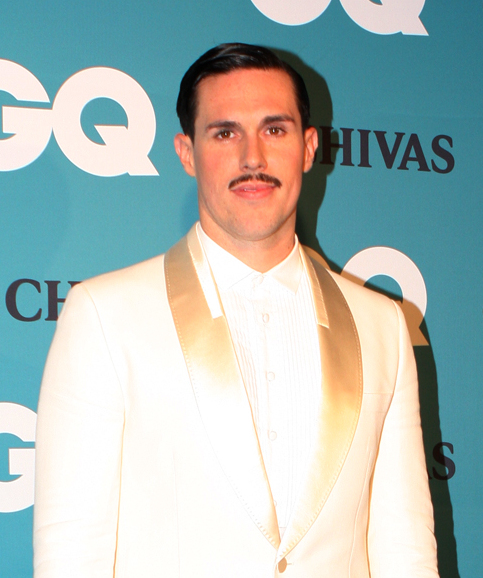
- Sparro in November 2012

Background information
- Born: Samuel Frankland Falson; 8 November 1982 (age 43); Sydney, New South Wales, Australia
- Genres: Funktronica; funk; synth-pop; soul; neo soul; nu-disco; house
- Occupations: Singer; songwriter; record producer
- Instruments: Vocals; keyboards
- Years active: 2006–present Chauffeur group members: Mark Ronson; Theophilus London; Member of The Bottletop Band
- Labels: Modus Vivendi; Island; Universal; EMI; Virgin; Sparro; Intuit; Pulse
- Spouse: Zion Lennox (m. 2018)

Samuel Falson (born 8 November 1982), better known by his stage name Sam Sparro, is an Australian singer, songwriter and record producer. He was signed to the British record label Island Records. Sparro is best known for his 2008 single "Black and Gold".

== Biography ==
Sam Sparro was born on November 8, 1982, and raised in Sydney, Australia. Sparro's father, Chris Falson is a gospel minister and recording artist of Maltese and Portuguese descent who has written music for Star Trek and Queer Eye for the Straight Guy. Sparro's mother, Karyn Falson (née Frankland) is from Australia. His brother plays guitar professionally while his mother plays organ at a Baptist church. The family relocated to Los Angeles when Sparro was ten years old. His father had signed a deal there and was recording a soul album, he took Sparro to a church in Tujunga to hear some of the genre's singers. Fellow church goers, were the McCrary family. Chaka Khan became one of his early admirers after hearing Sparro's singing through knowing the McCrarys. His first role as a child actor was in a McDonald's commercial. His stage name was derived from a family nickname, which in turn was inspired by the Sydney radio announcer Gary O'Callaghan's on-air character "Sammy Sparrow".

Sparro left Los Angeles and returned to Sydney, where he lived with his grandparents and worked for a public relations company, before travelling to the UK, immersing himself in the music scene in London. He returned to Los Angeles in 2002, where he took a job in a coffee shop. It was during this time that he wrote his single, "Black and Gold" with his producer, Jesse Rogg. When growing up, Sparro regularly performed backing vocals at his father's concerts and on his music releases. He states "I'm a spiritual person, but ... not into any religion. I was always kind of a non-denominational Christian" and "a bit of a gypsy". Sparro is openly gay. He did an interview for Attitude magazine and was featured on the front cover. Sparro married DJ Zion Lennox in a private ceremony in California on 21 September 2018.

== Career ==
=== Sam Sparro and breakthrough (2007–2012) ===
Sparro's debut single, "Cottonmouth", was released in late 2007. His second single, "Black and Gold", peaked at number two in the United Kingdom in April 2008 and at number four in Australia, and has since been used in soundtracks and promotional campaigns for various television series, video games, and films. Sparro's self-titled debut album, Sam Sparro, was released in the UK in April 2008 and reached the top five on the UK Albums Chart, eventually receiving a gold certification from the BPI for selling 100,000 copies. Two subsequent singles, "21st Century Life" and "Pocket", were considerably less successful on the charts.

During promotion of "Black and Gold", Sparro covered "American Boy" by Estelle on Jo Whiley's Live Lounge on BBC Radio 1. In September 2008, Sparro was nominated for five ARIA Music Awards. His tour that month formed part of the Wonky Pop tour; Wonky Pop is a new genre of music created by artists such as Sparro and Alphabeat. In December 2008, Sparro and co-writer/ producer Jesse Rogg received a Grammy Award nomination for Best Dance Recording for "Black and Gold".

Sparro is featured on the Basement Jaxx single "Feelings Gone", released in September 2009. He also collaborated on a track called "Soles on Fire" with Chauffeur, which consists of Sparro, Theophilus London and producer Mark Ronson. In March 2010, a new single, "Corrected" was released to U.S. iTunes and is a collaboration with Mason (DJ) and rapper DMC. Sparro co-wrote Voodoo with Adam Lambert, a song that appears on the international and tour editions of Lambert's album For Your Entertainment and digital ep Remixes.In July 2010, a new song titled "Pink Cloud" was premiered on East Village Radio's Accidental Rhythm. The premiered song was stated to be un-mastered. The video for the song, directed by artist and designer Franc Fernandez, was uploaded onto Sparro's YouTube channel in December 2010. Sparro stated via his Twitter that the video is an art project, and the song was not released as a single. Addressing rumours of a mostly instrumental album, he clarified that, unlike "Pink Cloud", his second album would be full of tracks featuring his vocals. A free EP was released following the release of the video.

=== Return to Paradise (2012–2014) ===
Sparro announced his second album, Return to Paradise, on his newly redesigned website. It was described as being inspired by soul and funk from the late seventies and early eighties. A new video premiered, featuring a new track from the album. In January 2012, "The Shallow End" was uploaded onto VEVO and YouTube. It is "compiled of home video footage of the making of the record and was filmed in LA, New York, London and Spain." The album was released in spring 2012, accompanied by tours in the United States and Australia. A video was filmed for the upcoming track, "Happiness". Sam collaborated with Adam Lambert again for Lambert's second album Trespassing, co-writing Shady and Broken English with Lambert and Lester Mendez. Sam and Adam performed Shady together with Nile Rodgers at the We are Family gala on 31 January 2013.

In late 2013, Sparro released his first mixtape Mechanical to SoundCloud, featuring sixteen songs. On 17 September 2013, Sparro collaborated with The Bloody Beetroots on a track titled "Glow in the Dark" stating that "It's one of my favorite songs I've written recently." On 1 October 2013, Sparro's new EP, Quantum Physical, was released, in which the lead single being "Hang on To Your Love" featuring Durand Bernarr Hang on To Your Love, Fascism, and Infinite were included from Mechanical. He is currently working on and directing the music video for "Hang on To Your Love".

=== Quantum Physical, Vol. 2 (2014–present) ===
On 14 February 2014 "Stay in Love", Sparro's fourth single as a featured artist was released with producer, instrumentalist, and lifelong friend Plastic Plates to the producer's SoundCloud account. The release was appropriately timed as Sparro posted a link to the track on his Facebook and Twitter accounts with the words "Happy Valentines Day Lovers". The song was made available for digital purchase on 19 February, contrary to the official release date of 13 February listed everywhere.

Sparro's mixtape Love Made Me Do It was released to his SoundCloud account on 13 February 2015. 31 July of that year he released the single "Hands Up" from the second volume of Quantum Physical, with a remix single following on 25 September. Quantum Physical, Vol. 2 was released on 16 October 2015 with Intuit Records.

== Discography ==
- Sam Sparro (2008)
- Return to Paradise (2012)
- Boombox Eternal (2020)

== Awards and nominations ==
ARIA Music Awards

Year	Nominee / work	Award	Result
2008	Sam Sparro	Best Male Artist	Nominated
2008	Sam Sparro	Breakthrough Artist – Album	Nominated
2008	"Black and Gold"	Breakthrough Artist – Single	Nominated
2008	"Black and Gold"	Best Pop Release	Nominated
2008	"Black and Gold"	Single of the Year	Nominated

GLAAD Media Awards

Year	Nominee / work	Award	Result
2009	Sam Sparro	Outstanding Music Artist	Won

Grammy Awards

Year	Nominee / work	Award	Result
2009	"Black and Gold"	Best Dance Recording	Nominated

GQ Australia Man of the Year Awards

Year	Nominee / work	Award	Result
2012	Sam Sparro	Man of Style	Won

MTV Australia Awards

Year	Nominee / work	Award	Result
2009	"Black and Gold"	Best Dance Video	Nominated

Virgin Media Music Awards

Year	Nominee / work	Award	Result	Ref.
2008	Sam Sparro	Best New Act	Nominated	
