= La Roux discography =

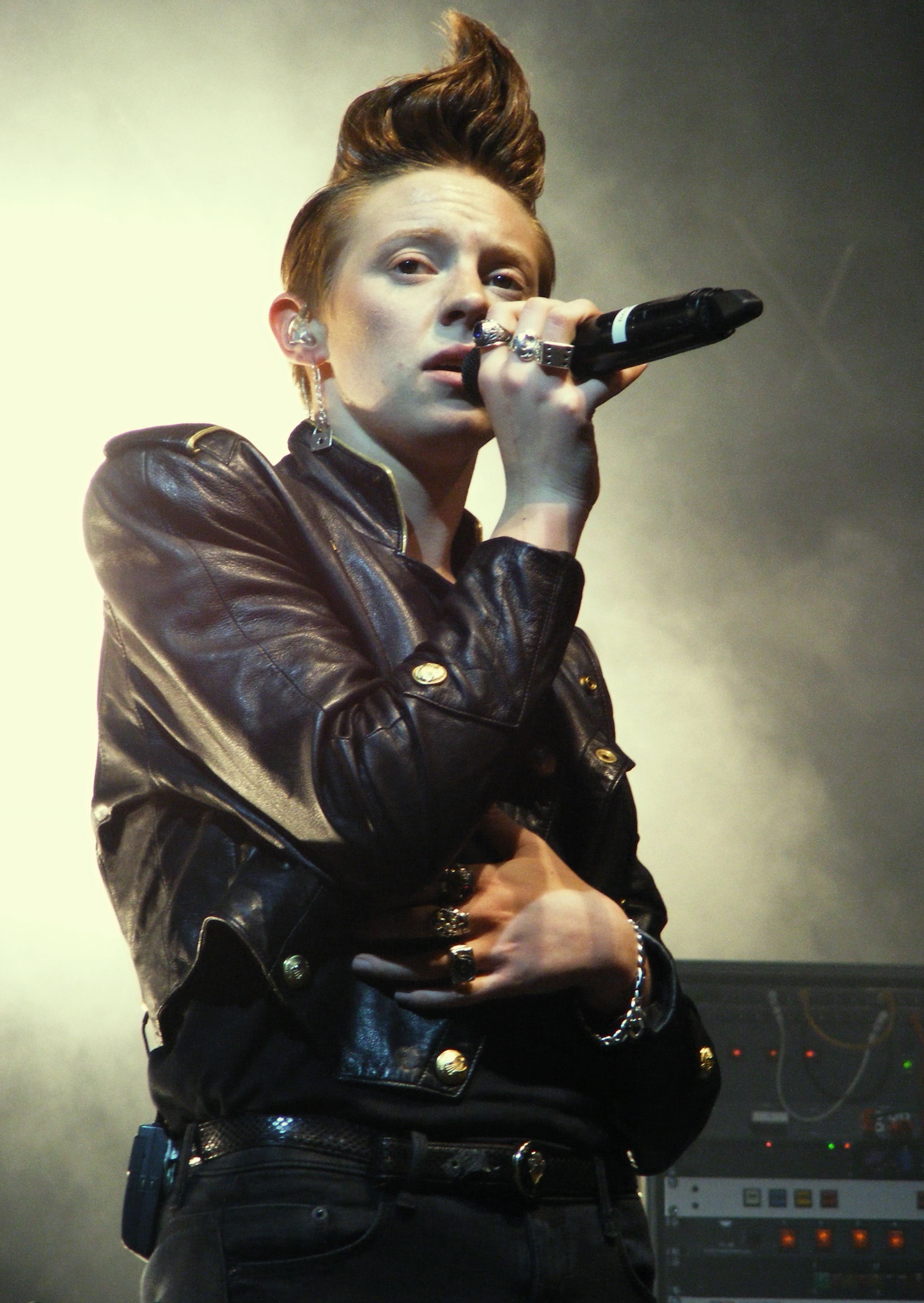
- Lead singer Elly Jackson performing in September 2010
- Studio albums: 4
- Extended plays: 2
- Singles: 17
- Music videos: 11
- Promotional singles: 2
- Mix albums: 1
- Mixtapes: 1

English singer and songwriter La Roux has released four studio albums, one mix album, one mixtape, two extended plays, 17 singles (including two as a featured artist), two promotional singles and 11 music videos. La Roux was originally formed as a duo in 2006, consisting of Elly Jackson and Ben Langmaid. They first collaborated on the acoustic project Automan before opting to switch to a musical style similar to that of Prince, David Bowie and the Knife, naming their new project La Roux.

The duo's eponymous debut studio album was released in June 2009, reaching number two on the UK Albums Chart and number seven on the Irish Albums Chart. The album was eventually certified platinum by the British Phonographic Industry (BPI) and the Irish Recorded Music Association (IRMA). In 2011, La Roux won a Grammy Award for Best Electronic/Dance Album. Four singles were released from the album: "Quicksand", "In for the Kill", "Bulletproof" and "I'm Not Your Toy". "Bulletproof" peaked at number one on the UK Singles Chart and was certified gold by the BPI. Following Langmaid's departure from La Roux, Jackson released La Roux's second studio album, Trouble in Paradise, in July 2014.

== Albums ==
=== Studio albums ===
List of studio albums, with selected chart positions, sales figures and certifications
Title	Details	Peak chart positions										Sales	Certifications
Title	Details	UK	AUS	AUT	BEL (FL)	CAN	GER	IRE	NOR	NZ	US	Sales	Certifications
La Roux	Released: 26 June 2009; Label: Polydor; Formats: CD, LP, digital download	2	22	34	34	34	54	7	36	26	70	UK: 416,667	BPI: Platinum; ARIA: Gold; IRMA: Platinum; RMNZ: Platinum
Trouble in Paradise	Released: 18 July 2014; Label: Polydor; Formats: CD, LP, digital download	6	28	50	19	13	33	15	38	—	20		
Supervision	Released: 7 February 2020; Label: Supercolour; Format: CD, LP, digital download, cassette	20	—	—	—	—	85	—	—	—	— (Note: "Supervision" did not enter the Billboard 200, but peaked at number 71 on the Top Current Album Sales chart.)		
Old Flames	Released: 6 November 2026; Label: Vertigo, Universal; Format: CD, LP, digital download	48	—	—	—	—	—	—	—	—	—		
"—" denotes a recording that did not chart or was not released in that territory.

=== Mix albums ===
Title	Details
Sidetracked	Released: 26 July 2010; Label: Renaissance; Formats: CD, digital download

=== Mixtapes ===
Title	Details
Lazerproof (with Major Lazer)	Released: 26 May 2010; Label: Mad Decent; Formats: CD, digital download

== Extended plays ==
Title	Details
iTunes Festival: London 2009	Released: 10 July 2009; Label: Polydor; Format: Digital download
The Gold EP	Released: 11 May 2010; Label: Cherrytree, Interscope; Format: Digital download

== Singles ==
=== As lead artist ===
List of singles as lead artist, with selected chart positions and certifications, showing year released and album name
Title	Year	Peak chart positions										Certifications	Album
Title	Year	UK	AUS	AUT	BEL (FL)	GER	IRE	NOR	NZ	US	US Dance/ Elec.	Certifications	Album
"Quicksand"	2008	129	—	—	— (Note: "Quicksand" did not enter the Ultratop 50, but peaked at number 19 on the Flemish Ultratip chart.)	—	—	—	—	— (Note: "Quicksand" did not enter the Billboard Hot 100, but peaked at number 18 on the Hot Singles Sales chart.)	— (Note: "Quicksand" did not enter the Hot Dance/Electronic Songs chart, but peaked at number eight on the Dance Singles Sales chart.)		La Roux
"In for the Kill"	2009	2	36	53	43	92	13	11	—	— (Note: "In For the Kill" did not enter the Billboard Hot 100, but peaked at number 27 on the Hot Singles Sales chart.)	— (Note: "In for the Kill" did not enter the Hot Dance/Electronic Songs chart, but peaked at number 10 on the Dance/Electronic Digital Song Sales chart.)	BPI: 2× Platinum; ARIA: Platinum; RMNZ: Platinum	La Roux
"Bulletproof"	2009	1	5	3	5	13	5	18	7	8	— (Note: "Bulletproof" did not enter the Hot Dance/Electronic Songs chart, but peaked at number one on the Dance/Electronic Digital Song Sales chart.)	BPI: 2× Platinum; ARIA: 2× Platinum; BVMI: Gold; MC: Platinum; RIAA: 2× Platinum; RMNZ: 3× Platinum	La Roux
"I'm Not Your Toy"	2009	27	79	—	— (Note: "I'm Not Your Toy" did not enter the Ultratop 50, but peaked at number 14 on the Flemish Ultratip chart.)	—	—	—	—	—	— (Note: "I'm Not Your Toy" did not enter the Hot Dance/Electronic Songs chart, but peaked at number 33 on the Dance/Electronic Digital Song Sales chart.)		La Roux
"Uptight Downtown"	2014	63	—	—	— (Note: "Uptight Downtown" did not enter the Ultratop 50, but peaked at number four on the Flemish Ultratip chart.)	—	—	—	—	—	29		Trouble in Paradise
"Kiss and Not Tell"	2014	— (Note: "Kiss and Not Tell" did not enter the UK Singles Chart, but peaked at number 53 on the UK Physical Singles Chart.)	—	—	— (Note: "Kiss and Not Tell" did not enter the Ultratop 50, but peaked at number 26 on the Flemish Ultratip chart.)	—	—	—	—	—	—		Trouble in Paradise
"International Woman of Leisure"	2019	—	—	—	— (Note: "International Woman of Leisure" did not enter the Ultratop 50, but peaked at number 35 on the Flemish Ultratip chart.)	—	—	—	—	—	—		Supervision
"Gullible Fool"	2019	—	—	—	—	—	—	—	—	—	—		Supervision
"Automatic Driver" (original or Tyler, the Creator Remix)	2020	—	—	—	—	—	—	—	—	—	—		Supervision
"Too Far" (with Boulevards)	2020	—	—	—	—	—	—	—	—	—	—		Non-album singles
"Park Assist" (with CASisDEAD)	2021	—	—	—	—	—	—	—	—	—	—		Non-album singles
"Damaged Goods"	2021	—	—	—	—	—	—	—	—	—	—		The Problem of Leisure: A Celebration of Andy Gill and Gang of Four
"IFTK" (with Tion Wayne)	2022	6	—	—	—	—	10	—	—	—	—	BPI: Platinum; RMNZ: Gold	Non-album singles
"Feedback" (featuring Baby Tate)	2022	—	—	—	—	—	—	—	—	—	—		Non-album singles
"Discoproof" (with Chromeo)	2023	—	—	—	—	—	—	—	—	—	—		Non-album singles
"Cabin Fever"	2026	—	—	—	—	—	—	—	—	—	—		Old Flames
"Babyline"	2026	—	—	—	—	—	—	—	—	—	—		Old Flames
"Lose Myself"	2026	—	—	—	—	—	—	—	—	—	—		Old Flames
"Night Vision"	2026	—	—	—	—	—	—	—	—	—	—		Old Flames
"—" denotes a recording that did not chart or was not released in that territory.

=== As featured artist ===
Title	Year	Album
"The Best of It" (Whyte Horses featuring La Roux)	2018	Empty Words
"Replacements" (Chromeo featuring La Roux)	2023	Adult Contemporary

=== Promotional singles ===
List of promotional singles, with selected chart positions, showing year released and album name
Title	Year	Peaks		Album
Title	Year	UK	FRA	Album
"Let Me Down Gently"	2014	194	—	Trouble in Paradise
"Tropical Chancer"	2014	—	162	Trouble in Paradise
"—" denotes a recording that did not chart or was not released in that territory.

== Guest appearances ==
List of non-single guest appearances, with other performing artists, showing year released and album name
Title	Year	Other artist(s)	Album
"Finally"	2010	Skream	Outside the Box
"Temptation" (live)	2012	Heaven 17	This Is BBC Radio 6 Music Live

== Other credits ==
Title	Year	Artist	Album	Credit(s)
"All of the Lights"	2010	Kanye West	My Beautiful Dark Twisted Fantasy	Uncredited vocals
"Plastic"	2015	New Order	Music Complete	Backing vocals
"Tutti Frutti"	2015	New Order	Music Complete	Vocals
"People on the High Line"	2015	New Order	Music Complete	Vocals
"Gone, Gone / Thank You"	2019	Tyler, the Creator	Igor	Backing vocals

== Music videos ==
List of music videos, showing year released and directors
Title	Year	Director(s)
"Quicksand"	2008	Kinga Burza
"In for the Kill"	2009	Kinga Burza
"Bulletproof"	2009	The Holograms
"I'm Not Your Toy"	2009	AlexandLiane
"In for the Kill" (US version)	2010	LEGS
"Let Me Down Gently"	2014	Oliver Hadlee Pearch
"Kiss and Not Tell"	2014	Alexander Brown
"International Woman of Leisure"	2019	Nova Dando
"Gullible Fool"	2019	Sam Bell
"Automatic Driver"	2020	Valentin Guiod
"Damaged Goods"	2021	Leo Cackett
