= List of Billboard number-one electronic albums of 2014 =

These are the albums that reached number one on the Billboard Dance/Electronic Albums chart in 2014.

== Chart history ==
Key
†	Indicates best-performing album of 2014

Issue date	Album	Artist	Reference
January 4	Artpop †	Lady Gaga	
January 11	Artpop †	Lady Gaga	
January 18	Artpop †	Lady Gaga	
January 25	Artpop †	Lady Gaga	
February 1	Artpop †	Lady Gaga	
February 8	Random Access Memories	Daft Punk	
February 15	Random Access Memories	Daft Punk	
February 22	Random Access Memories	Daft Punk	
March 1	Love Death Immortality	The Glitch Mob	
March 8	Random Access Memories	Daft Punk	
March 15	Random Access Memories	Daft Punk	
March 22	The White Album	Hillsong United	
March 29	True	Avicii	
April 5	Recess	Skrillex	
April 12	Recess	Skrillex	
April 19	Recess	Skrillex	
April 26	Recess	Skrillex	
May 3	Savages	Breathe Carolina	
May 10	Recess	Skrillex	
May 17	Shatter Me †	Lindsey Stirling	
May 24	Shatter Me †	Lindsey Stirling	
May 31	White Women	Chromeo	
June 7	Shatter Me †	Lindsey Stirling	
June 14	Do It Again	Röyksopp and Robyn	
June 21	Donker Mag	Die Antwoord	
June 28	Shatter Me †	Lindsey Stirling	
July 5	while(1<2)	deadmau5	
July 12	Noise vs. Beauty	Bassnectar	
July 19	Shatter Me †	Lindsey Stirling	
July 26	Shatter Me †	Lindsey Stirling	
August 2	Settle	Disclosure	
August 9	Trouble in Paradise	La Roux	
August 16	Shatter Me	Lindsey Stirling	
August 23	Now That's What I Call Party Anthems 2	Various artists	
August 30	Worlds	Porter Robinson	
September 6	Sparks	Imogen Heap	
September 13	LP1	FKA twigs	
September 20	In Return	Odesza	
September 27	Shatter Me †	Lindsey Stirling	
October 4	Shatter Me †	Lindsey Stirling	
October 11	Syro	Aphex Twin	
October 18	Neon Future I	Steve Aoki	
October 25	You're Dead!	Flying Lotus	
November 1	You're Dead!	Flying Lotus	
November 8	Sound of a Woman	Kiesza	
November 15	Settle	Disclosure	
November 22	Motion	Calvin Harris	
November 29	Motion	Calvin Harris	
December 6	Motion	Calvin Harris	
December 13	Listen	David Guetta	
December 20	Listen	David Guetta	
December 27	Shatter Me †	Lindsey Stirling	
