= Kubb (band) =

British indie rock band

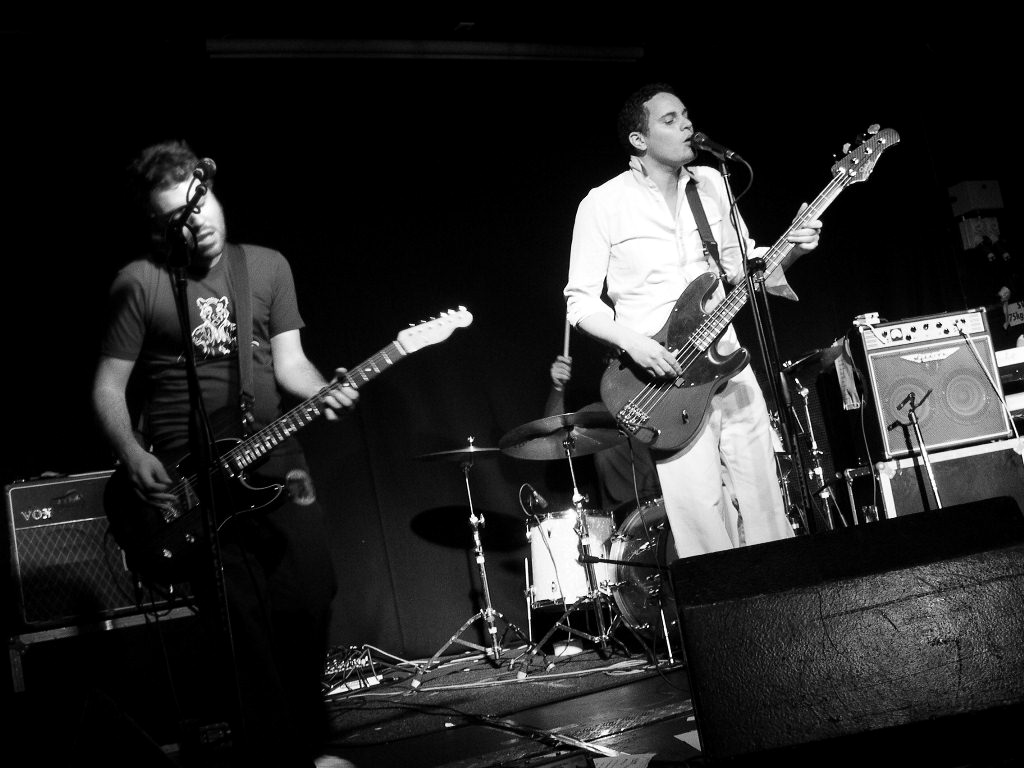
- Kubb performing live in Leeds, 2006

Background information
- Origin: United Kingdom
- Genres: Indie rock, alternative rock, post-Britpop
- Years active: 2005-2006
- Label: Mercury
- Past members: Alex Evans; Adj Buffone; Dominic Greensmith; Ben Langmaid; Harry Collier; Jeff Patterson; John Hogg; John Tilley; Martin Wright

Kubb was a British indie rock band from London, that had two UK Top 40 hits in 2005-06 and a Top 30 album. Original member Ben Langmaid went on to become half of the duo La Roux.

== Biography ==
The band started to form when singer Harry Collier, previously of Rootjoose, was invited by Rollo Armstrong (of Faithless fame) to record in the latter's studio after Armstrong heard him sing "Happy Birthday" in the organic café where he was working as a waiter in 2001. At the studio he met Armstrong's old schoolfriend Ben Langmaid, who had a studio in the same complex, and Jeff Patterson. Collier grew up in Tobago, returning to England at age 17. The trio began writing songs together that would become Kubb's debut album, Mother. Langmaid and Patterson were only interested in studio and songwriting work, so Collier recruited former Reef member Dom Greensmith (drums), John Tilley (keyboards), and Adj Buffone (guitar).

The band were signed by Mercury Records, and narrowly missed out on a Top 40 hit with the second single "Remain". The follow-up "Wicked Soul" gave them a Top 30 hit and was used in a Rimmel cosmetics advert on television, and the Youth-produced debut album Mother also reached the Top 30 of the UK Albums Chart, going on to be certified gold. Collier explained the album's title: "The earth is our mother; we're all made of dirt. It's given birth to us. Most people's emotional make-up stems from their relationship with their mother. So it's a very pertinent word and a very beautiful word."

The band had their biggest hit with "Grow", which reached No. 18 in the UK Singles Chart. The band headlined several tours in the UK. They also played two gigs at the Shepherd's Bush Empire and made guest appearances on Friday Night with Jonathan Ross (on 16 December 2005, and on the Jonathan Ross Radio Show on 4 February 2006). They also appeared on Jools Holland's show Later..., Popworld, CDUK, the Des and Mel Show, The Friday Night Project, and appeared three times on Top of the Pops. They performed an iTunes Live from London gig at the London Apple Store. They recorded a 'secret session' for Tiscali. They appeared at the V Festival and the Isle of Wight Festival.

Guitarist Adj Buffone announced that he had left the band and formed the band Raygun in November 2006. Lead singer Harry Collier was featured on the 2006 Faithless single "Bombs".

Kubb's official website was last updated in 2006, and news on the band has been lacking since Buffone left. Harry Collier is currently working on new material for Kubb with a new line-up that features John Hogg (guitar) and Alex Evans (keyboards) from Moke, and Martin Wright (drums). The band played the O2 Shepherd's Bush Empire in December 2009 under the name The Daddy. Original member Ben Langmaid served as half of the duo La Roux until his departure in 2012.

== Musical style ==
The band have drawn comparisons with others such as Radiohead, Muse, Keane, and Jeff Buckley. Caroline Sullivan in The Guardian commented: "Kubb specialise in the kind of arena-sized balladry that has Coldplay racking up the frequent-flyer miles", and compared Collier's voice to Buckley and Antony Hegarty. Dave Simpson, writing in The Guardian, described the band's sound as "Abbey Road-era Beatles fronted by Jeff Buckley with a suggestion of epic, melancholy 1980s heroic failures such as The Comsat Angels."

== Discography ==
=== Albums ===
- Mother (14 November 2005), Mercury - UK # 26
- Live from London (iTunes) (7 March 2006)

=== Singles ===
From Mother:

- "Somebody Else" (30 May 2005)
- "Remain" (22 August 2005), UK # 45
- "Wicked Soul" (7 November 2005), UK # 25 TUR # 14
- "Grow" (6 February 2006), UK # 18
- "Remain" (1 May 2006), UK # 189

=== Opendisc ===
Exclusive content available through Opendisc: Video: 'Grow', 'Remain', Making Of 'Remain', Kubb Interview, Vidéo Live au Barfly and photos.
