= Raygun (band) =

British band (2006–2010)

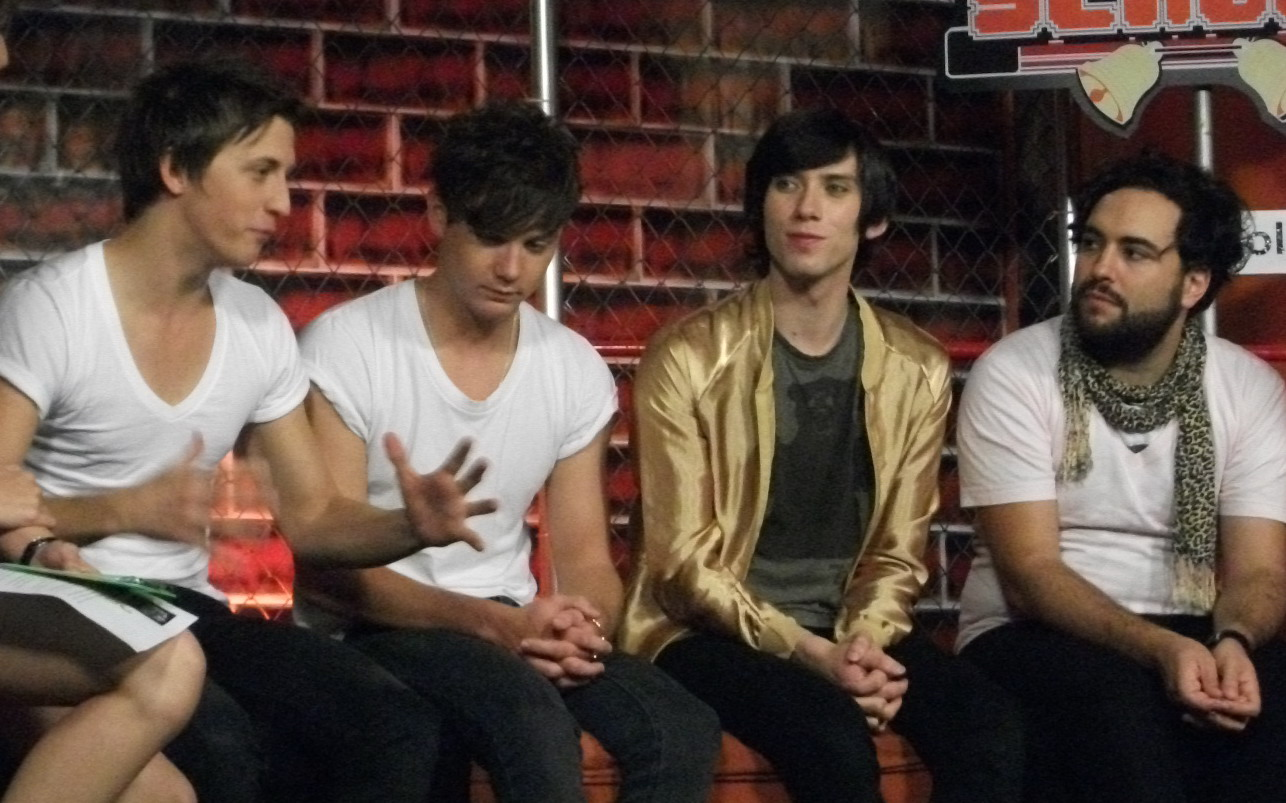
- Raygun at MTV Fast Forward.

Background information
- Also known as: Raygun and the Adjitators Psycheldelic Zoo
- Origin: Guildford, England
- Genres: Pop rock
- Years active: 2006–2010
- Label: RCA
- Past members: Tobias Ratcliffe; Adriano Buffone; Sam Embery; Ben Lyonsmyth

Raygun were a British band formerly signed to RCA Records.

== History ==
Adriano Buffone (known as The Adj), the former guitarist of indie rock band Kubb, met lead singer Tobias Alexander Ratcliffe (known as Ray Gun) while studying Music Technology in Guildford. The two began writing songs and performing around Surrey and London, putting on live music events under the name 'Raygun and the Adjitators'. The duo recruited bass player Ben Lyonsmyth and drummer Sam Embery, resulting in live performances and recording an album at Britannia Row with producer Tim Bran.

== Career ==
Raygun toured Thailand, Singapore, Malaysia, and the Philippines promoting the release of their debut album in Southeast Asia.

On 15 August 2009, Raygun made history when it was featured alongside Kasabian, Hoobastank, Pixie Lott, Boys Like Girls, and The All-American Rejects as one of the live acts at Asia's first MTV World Stage Live In Malaysia concert that was held in Malaysia.

The band supported Pink during the European leg of her 2009 Funhouse Tour. They have also supported Alphabeat, Paul Weller, The Script, and Newton Faulkner and toured smaller venues as headliners later in 2009.

Their debut single "Just Because" was released on August 3, 2009. The video for "Just Because" was directed by Joseph Kahn and it features a high-speed freeway chase. A flash game was also released to support the single.

Raygun was the supporting act for Peter Bjorn and John and Newton Faulkner at the iTunes Live festival on 13 July 2009.

== YouTube video ==
Channel 4's 4Play screened a 15-minute programme featuring the band. A negative Guardian article by Rhodri Marsden saw the video receive numerous predominantly negative comments. The criticism of the video mainly focused on the clichéd sentiments from singer Ray Gun likening his band to "Iggy Pop, James Brown, David Bowie and Shirley Bassey in a lift". He also claimed the album was "inspired by the perils of hedonism, when you go out and indulge too much and regret it the next day. Anything that you think is good for a while can end up being so harmful to yourself, whether it's love or sex or drugs or alcohol". Raygun later released a sarcastic apology for the whole debacle, which they posted on their MySpace blog.

== Discography ==
- Raygun (29 January 2009)

== Track listing ==
No.	Title	Length
1.	"Waiting In Line"	4:12
2.	"Just Because"	3:03
3.	"Can't Say No"	3:19
4.	"Lord Forgive Me"	4:23
5.	"It's A Mystery"	4:08
6.	"In The City"	3:17
7.	"Kaleidoscopic Kid"	3:20
8.	"See You Later"	3:55
9.	"Rocket Blast"	3:03
10.	"Fools Rush In"	3:26

== Demise and break-up ==
At the end of 2009, the band was dropped by Sony, which consequently led to Ray Gun and The Adj deciding to go their separate ways.

Sam and Ben are now playing for successful Scottish singer-songwriter Amy Macdonald and are currently touring with her. Ben also plays with X Factor star Olly Murs.
