= Old Flames (La Roux album) =

Studio album by La Roux
- Released: 6 November 2026
- Length: 35:33
- Labels: Vertigo; Universal
- Producer: Elly Jackson

La Roux chronology
Supervision (2020)	Old Flames (2026)

Singles from Old Flames
- 1. "Cabin Fever" Released: 7 May 2026; 2. "Babyline" Released: 26 June 2026; 3. "Lose Myself" Released: 14 August 2026

Old Flames is the fourth studio album by the English singer La Roux. It was released on 6 November 2026 through Vertigo Records and Universal Music Group.

== Background and recording ==
La Roux announced that she was working on her fourth album in 2020, and mentioned such songs as "People Around Here" and "Thanks for Having Me". On 26 October 2022, La Roux released the single "Feedback" featuring rapper Baby Tate, followed by "Malibu Marbie" on 27 July 2023, uploaded onto her YouTube channel. The latter had been recorded for the Barbie film, but not used in the soundtrack.

Jackson sported a bomber jacket with "Old Flames" printed on the back during her 2025 tour, which led fans to speculate that it could be the album's title.

La Roux revealed that the album was inspired by the 90s and early noughties American R&B music.

== Release and promotion ==
From March to May 2025, La Roux performed live in the US, Paris and London, previewing new material. On 7 May 2026, she announced the title of the album and its release date, simultaneously releasing the first single, "Cabin Fever". The album's second and third singles, "Babyline" and "Lose Myself", were released on 26 June and 14 August 2026, respectively. From June to October, La Roux was supporting Hilary Duff on her worldwide Lucky Me Tour. On 29 September, La Roux announced the Old Flames Tour, scheduled for January–March 2027 and Spanning North America and Europe.

== Track listing ==
All tracks are written by Elly Jackson, with other writers noted.

Old Flames track listing
No.	Title	Writer(s)	Length
1.	"Old Flames (Intro)"		1:50
2.	"Cabin Fever"	Letta Mbulu; Caiphus Semenya	3:29
3.	"Lose Myself"	Kyle Falconer; Michael Rendell	3:23
4.	"Falling"		3:13
5.	"To Make Our Love"	Jochem Fluitsma; Eric van Tijn	3:00
6.	"Your Lover"		3:41
7.	"Final Fantasy"		3:14
8.	"Night Vision"		3:12
9.	"I Just Keep Crying"		3:18
10.	"Babyline"		4:02
11.	"Old Flames (Reprise)"		3:11
Total length:			35:33

== Personnel ==
Credits are adapted from Tidal.

- Elly Jackson – vocals, drum kit, keyboards, synthesizer, production, pre-production (all tracks); bass (tracks 1–5, 7, 8, 10, 11), piano (2), guitar (6–9)
- Martin Eden – co-production, engineering, mixing (all tracks); programming (1, 3–10)
- Brian Lucey – mastering
- Sean Oakley – pre-production (1–10)
- Michael Rendell – keyboards (3)
- Mikey "The Kid" Wagner – guitar (8)
- Spencer Nezey – vocal programming (10)

== Charts ==
Chart performance for Old Flames
Chart (2026)	Peak position
Scottish Albums (Official Charts)	34
UK Albums (Official Charts)	48

== Release history ==
Release formats for Old Flames
Region	Date	Format	Label	Ref.
Various	6 November 2026	CD; LP; cassette; download; streaming	Vertigo	
