= Rootjoose =

Cornish surfer funk rock band

Rootjoose were a funk rock band from Cornwall. They purveyed a lively style of music reminiscent of surf rock bands such as contemporaries Reef, their live performances gained them some popularity in the South West of Britain during the late 1990s. Signed to Rage Records, the band released Rhubarb, their debut album, in 1997.

Band members Rob Elton, Jamie Crowe, Fez (James Hardaker) and Harry Collier achieved minor celebrity status in the South West and appeared on local and at one point national television with the band. Coming first in the national Battle of the Bands competition, an event sponsored by Capital Radio, the band performed at Earls Court.

Their most notable track - "Mr Fixit" - reached number 54 in the UK Singles Chart in August 1997. Other singles included "Can't Keep Living This Way", which made number 73 and "Long Way", which made number 68. Just as the band was tipped to break through into the mainstream, Rage (Rootjoose's record label) went bankrupt. The band was unable to secure a new recording contract, as the fashion at the time was for introspective indie music rather than their more upbeat style. The band broke up in 2001.

Collier later went on to form Kubb, who released their debut album, Mother, in 2005. Crowe and Elton went on to form the dance band Rairbirds.

== Albums ==
Rhubarb

Studio album by Rootjoose
- Released: 6 October 1997
- Genre: Indie rock, funk rock, surf rock
- Length: 64:12
- Label: Rage

Professional ratings
Review scores
Source	Rating
Allmusic	link

=== Rhubarb ===
Rhubarb is the only studio album to be produced by Rootjoose. It was released on 6 October 1997 and reached number 58 in the UK Albums Chart.

However, the EP Money and Time was released afterwards.

== Track listing ==
1. The Joose Is Coming Soon
2. Pie in the Sky
3. The Parradiddle Song
4. Never Knew You
5. Taxman
6. Mr Fixit
7. Holiday
8. Long Way
9. Inspiration
10. Place So Near
11. Can't Keep Living This Way
12. Anniversary
13. Virtually Fat Free

A cassette tape "The Sting" containing four tracks was produced and sold privately by the band around 1995. Produced by Jo Partridge and James Cassidy for Airfield Productions it featured the tracks Anniversary, Long Way, Pie in the Sky and The Sting of which only the last was not included later on the Rhubarb album. The tape has a white label and carries no catalogue number.
