= Kiss and Not Tell =

Single by La Roux

from the album Trouble in Paradise
- B-side: "Tropical Chancer"
- Released: 20 October 2014
- Genre: Electro
- Length: 3:53
- Label: Polydor
- Songwriter(s): Elly Jackson; Ian Sherwin; Ben Langmaid; Darren Berry
- Producer(s): Ian Sherwin; Elly Jackson

La Roux singles chronology
"Uptight Downtown" (2014)	"Kiss and Not Tell" (2014)	"The Best of It" (2018)

Music video
- "Kiss and Not Tell" on YouTube

"Kiss and Not Tell" is a song by English singer Elly Jackson, known professionally as La Roux, from her second studio album, Trouble in Paradise (2014). It was written and produced by Jackson and Ian Sherwin, with additional writing from Ben Langmaid and Darren Berry. The song was released as the album's second and final single on 20 October 2014. La Roux performed the track on Live with Kelly and Michael on 10 July 2014, as well as throughout the Trouble in Paradise tour. "Kiss and Not Tell" was La Roux's first single to fail to enter the UK Singles Chart, instead reaching number 53 on the UK Physical Singles Chart.

== Background ==
Elly Jackson has revealed that the song's lyrics are about a "feeling of when you're in a relationship and you both know the problems you might come up against maybe five years or 10 years into the relationship, but you choose to ignore them. [...] It's about all those secrets that you have that you both know about".

Jackson premiered "Kiss and Not Tell" at a concert in Brighton on 28 March 2013, along with three other songs that would eventually make it onto Trouble in Paradise: "Uptight Downtown", "Sexotheque" and "Tropical Chancer". She announced "Kiss and Not Tell" as the next single on her Instagram page on 2 September 2014, simultaneously revealing the cover art. The single was released on 20 October exclusively as a seven-inch vinyl single with "Tropical Chancer" as its B-side. A remix of the song was uploaded onto YouTube on 17 November, however, without crediting a specific author or stating the name of the remix.

== Critical reception ==
The song was met with positive reviews from music critics. Heather Phares picked it as one of the standout tracks in her AllMusic review. Billboard's Jason Lipshutz called the song an "effervescent treat".

== Music video ==
The music video for "Kiss and Not Tell" was directed by Alexander Brown and premiered on 7 September 2014. Designed as a 1980s TV advert for phone sex hotline, it pictures Jackson as a recipient for the calls. Upon dialing, the phone number advertised in the video directed to the pre-recorded voice message from Jackson: "You're through to the 'Kiss and Not Tell' hotline. Press 1 to get down. Press 2 to leave a cheeky message. Be careful what you say – these recordings can and will be shared". The hotline was also advertised on promotional stickers distributed in London's Soho area in autumn 2014.

== Track listing ==
- 7-inch single

A. "Kiss and Not Tell" – 3:51
B. "Tropical Chancer" – 3:29

== Personnel ==
Credits adapted from the liner notes of Trouble in Paradise.

- Ian Sherwin – production, engineering, bass guitar, drum programming, mixing
- Elly Jackson – production, vocals, guitar, synth bass, keyboards, percussion, mixing
- Ben Langmaid – engineering
- Darren Berry – drum machine
- Chilly Gonzales – piano, Hammond organ
- Alan Moulder – mixing
- John Catlin – mixing assistance
- Caesar Edmunds – mixing assistance
- John Dent – mastering

== Charts ==
Weekly chart performance for "Kiss and Not Tell"
Chart (2014)	Peak position
Belgium (Ultratip Bubbling Under Flanders)	26
UK Physical Singles (Official Charts Company)	53

== Release history ==
Release dates for "Kiss and Not Tell"
Region	Date	Format	Label	Ref.
United Kingdom	20 October 2014	7-inch single	Polydor	
