= Trouble in Paradise (La Roux album) =

2014 studio album by La Roux

Studio album by La Roux
- Released: 18 July 2014
- Recorded: 2010, 2012–2014
- Studios: Big Barn; Lynchmob, London; Assault & Battery 1, London; Eastcote, London; The Isle of Bingy
- Genres: Synth-pop; new wave; disco
- Length: 41:27
- Label: Polydor
- Producers: Elly Jackson; Ian Sherwin

La Roux chronology
La Roux (2009)	Trouble in Paradise (2014)	Supervision (2020)

Singles from Trouble in Paradise
- 1. "Uptight Downtown" Released: 28 May 2014; 2. "Kiss and Not Tell" Released: 20 October 2014

Trouble in Paradise is the second studio album by English singer Elly Jackson, known professionally as La Roux. It was released on 18 July 2014 by Polydor Records. La Roux originally consisted of Jackson and producer Ben Langmaid, who collaborated during the earlier stages of production. However, Jackson was left to complete the record in early 2014 after Langmaid departed from the group in early 2012. Consequently, she partnered with producer Ian Sherwin during the later stages of production. Their efforts resulted in a primarily new wave record, which Jackson described as being "warmer" and "sexier" than her debut studio album, La Roux (2009).

Upon its release, Trouble in Paradise received positive reviews from music critics, who commended La Roux's shift in musical style and viewed it as an improvement on its predecessor. The album debuted at number six on the UK Albums Chart with first-week sales of 8,391 copies. It debuted at number 20 on the Billboard 200 in the United States, where it also became La Roux's first album to top the Dance/Electronic Albums chart. "Uptight Downtown" was released as the lead single from the album, peaking at number 63 on the UK Singles Chart. "Kiss and Not Tell" was released as the album's second single, but failed to chart.

== Background and recording ==
In an interview with BBC Radio 6 Music on 27 November 2009, La Roux frontwoman Elly Jackson announced that she and Ben Langmaid had plans to start writing material for the duo's second album at their manager's house in France over the Christmas period. It was reported in December 2011 that Jackson and Langmaid were working on La Roux's second album in a studio in the English countryside. According to Jackson, recording for Trouble in Paradise began in the second quarter of 2012, and finished around the beginning of 2014. The first song recorded for the album was "The Feeling", dating back to around 2010.

Jackson began to suffer panic attacks due to extensive touring in support of La Roux's eponymous debut album, and after finishing touring in early 2011, she found herself unable to sing in falsetto. After months of seeing throat specialists, she was diagnosed with residual muscle tension caused by a form of performance anxiety. With the aid of a performance anxiety specialist, it took two years for Jackson to overcome her vocal problems. In 2013, Jackson played three low-key comeback shows in Brighton (28 March), Bristol (2 April) and Coventry (5 April). During her show in Brighton, she debuted four new songs that would eventually be included on Trouble in Paradise: "Uptight Downtown", "Kiss and Not Tell", "Sexotheque" and "Tropical Chancer". Jackson also performed at Coachella in April 2013.

In May 2014, it was confirmed that Jackson had parted ways with bandmate Ben Langmaid in February 2012, due to creative differences. "I came to him with some rare disco references and he made it very clear he didn't like them. There wasn't a great deal of understanding. Sometimes I thought we were on the same level, but then from the production that would come to light, I didn't feel that we were. I wasn't happy with the way some of the demos were sounding", Jackson explained.

In late June, Langmaid responded to Jackson's comments in a statement published in NME magazine, saying, "We've had creative differences in the past (what band hasn't?) but we always got through them and usually the music benefits. I am truly saddened that it has ended this way, but I am immensely proud of what we achieved together. We wrote five great songs together, all of which are on the album. I'm looking forward to the record being a great success and I shall enjoy watching it unfold. I have immense pride in the part I played; no one can take that away from me." The album was originally recorded with Langmaid in a converted barn in Devon. Following Langmaid's departure, engineer Ian Sherwin took over production duties.

== Composition ==
=== Style and influences ===
Jackson commented in January 2010 that she would employ a different vocal style to her second album, which would also contain different musical influences. "The type of music I like now is completely different. I don't listen to 80s music any more. Obviously I still do but not the same type of 80s music. I've listened to a lot more Italo-disco and old funk", she said. Speaking to Spinner in October 2010, Jackson declared that she did not intend to "make synth music for the rest of [her] fucking life" and that "[t]he whole genre is so over", adding that she wanted the second album to be "more human, more open, warmer". In March 2011, Jackson stated that she had been listening to classic disco, Donna Summer, Tom Tom Club and Grace Jones, while expressing that she would like "a more sexual feel to the record, but not in a sex-in-the-club kinda way—the way sexy was before it got made dirty. Sexy can be classy, sexy can be cool, sexy can be actually sexy".

Jackson has also cited "weird, late '70s and early '80s sci-fi disco", as well as dub and ragga elements. "We call it ragga-disco. We're trying to make party tunes out of much slower tempos, which I really like and there's not a lot of in music", she said. She has noted that, unlike the "disco tempo" of her first album, Trouble in Paradise carries a slower tempo, and she considers it to be "a lot warmer" and "a lot sexier". Jackson has stated that she played more guitar on the album; she and Ian Sherwin would play guitar and bass guitar, respectively, and "build a rough groove, jam along with it for an hour, find the best bits, and go back to that groove". They aimed to create an album that evoked "what people in the 1970s thought that the future was going to look and sound like".

=== Music and lyrics ===
Trouble in Paradise combines a variety of music genres such as synth-pop, new wave and disco. According to Hugh Montgomery of The Independent, the album replaces the "chilly retro-futurism" of its predecessor with "a lissom tropical-pop sound, complete with funk guitar, calypso rhythms and love among the palm trees", while Nick Levine of Time Out London commented that La Roux's new sound incorporates "Chic-like guitar licks and balmy synth parts straight off early MTV". Lyrically, the album discusses themes of sexual identity, desire, independence and codependence.

The album opens with "Uptight Downtown", which Jackson wrote about the 2011 London riots, specifically the energy that she perceived in Brixton at the time. The song blends modern electropop with 1970s disco, while displaying elements of funk and soul. Critics likened "Uptight Downtown" to Nile Rodgers's guitar work on David Bowie's 1983 song "Let's Dance". According to Jackson, "Kiss and Not Tell" is "kind of the feeling of when you're in a relationship and you both know the problems you might come up against maybe five years or 10 years into the relationship, but you choose to ignore them [...] It could be something like 'I hate your mum' or something like that and you know that it's going to be an issue at some point down the line, but you ignore it for the sake of your current love." The song's instrumentation consists of creeping guitars, squealing synthesisers and thumping bass.

"Cruel Sexuality" is about "10 different subjects linked together", and is built on a funky bassline and sunlit synthesisers. Alexis Petridis of The Guardian hailed the track as "the most sublimely euphoric exploration in recent pop history of the pressures placed by society on the individual who declines to define themselves as either straight or gay." The chillout ballad "Paradise Is You" is a "panic-prevention visualisation technique disguised as a love song", led by a piano and lush synth pads. Named after a sex club that Jackson saw while visiting the Montreux Jazz Festival in Switzerland, the mid-tempo disco song "Sexotheque" is about a man who ignores his girlfriend for seedier pleasures. "Tropical Chancer" is a disco and electro-calypso track that incorporates elements of reggae and dancehall, set against a Nile Rodgers-inspired funk guitar and echoing steel drums. The song tells the story of a Caribbean wide boy that Jackson had known for many years, whom she describes as the tropical version of Del Boy, a character from the British sitcom Only Fools and Horses played by David Jason.

"Silent Partner" is a seven-minute uptempo synth-pop song that employs a Hi-NRG bassline. Although some critics speculated that the song is about Langmaid's departure from La Roux, it directly addresses Jackson's issues with anxiety. "Let Me Down Gently" is a synth-pop ballad, described as a "slow-burning exercise in worry". The song opens with a "steady electronic beat bumping through the buzz", and after a brief moment of silence, it builds into a "euphoric, cathartic barnstormer, complete with skyscraping sax solo." The album's closing track, "The Feeling", was the first song recorded for the album. "I made this song at 4:00 in the morning when I couldn't sleep one night about four years ago, a long time ago, when I still lived at my parents' house", Jackson said. Lyrically, she summarised the song as a "guilty tale".

== Release and promotion ==
Trouble in Paradise was officially announced on 12 May 2014, and on the same day, the song "Let Me Down Gently" premiered on Zane Lowe's BBC Radio 1 show. The album's first official single, "Uptight Downtown", premiered on Lowe's BBC Radio 1 show on 27 May 2014, and was released digitally the following day. The single reached number 63 on the UK Singles Chart. Another track from the album, "Tropical Chancer", premiered online on 9 June 2014.

La Roux performed "Uptight Downtown" on Good Morning America on 11 June 2014. On 15 July, the album was made available to stream in full at iTunes Radio. The album's second and final single, "Kiss and Not Tell", was released on 20 October 2014 on seven-inch vinyl, limited to 500 copies. La Roux performed the song on Late Night with Seth Meyers on 6 October 2014 and on Live! with Kelly and Michael on 7 October.

On 3 April 2014, La Roux announced a North American tour, which spanned 10 dates from 1 June to 13 July, including two opening shows for New Order in San Francisco and Los Angeles. On 12 May, she announced a string of UK dates, with one show in London on 1 July and the rest in November. The second leg of La Roux's North American tour in support of the Trouble in Paradise, consisting of 11 dates from 18 September to 4 October, was announced on 15 July, along with additional European dates for August, November and December 2014.

== Critical reception ==
Professional ratings
Aggregate scores
Source	Rating
AnyDecentMusic?	7.8/10
Metacritic	76/100
Review scores
Source	Rating
AllMusic	3.5/5 stars
Billboard	76/100
The Guardian	5/5 stars
The Independent	5/5 stars
NME	9/10
The Observer	3/5 stars
Pitchfork	6.5/10
Q	4/5 stars
Rolling Stone	3.5/5 stars
Spin	8/10

Trouble in Paradise received generally positive reviews from music critics. At Metacritic, which assigns a normalised rating out of 100 to reviews from mainstream publications, the album received an average score of 76, based on 28 reviews. Alexis Petridis of The Guardian wrote that "La Roux's sound has expanded its horizons" and "the songwriting quality never really dips", concluding, "Almost sickeningly overburdened with fantastic tunes, Trouble in Paradise may well be not just a triumph against the odds, but the best pop album we'll hear this year." Hugh Montgomery of The Independent lauded the album as "supremely self-assured" and remarked, "At only nine tracks long, but with every one of them worthy of single status, [Trouble in Paradise] displays, as pop albums go, both rare economy and staggering consistency." Matthew Horton of NME observed that the use of bass on the album "irrevocably switch[ed] the La Roux sound from sparse to lush." He also observed "traces of the turmoil" on songs such as "Let Me Down Gently", "Silent Partner" and "Paradise Is You", stating, "In spite of all the terror and uncertainty, it's the warmth that lingers." Dean Van Nguyen of Clash viewed the album as "an altogether brighter piece" than its predecessor, and wrote that "this polished set is pure aural candy from front-to-back and firmly re-establishes Jackson as one of Britain's premier pop talents."

Rolling Stone's Will Hermes noted that on Trouble in Paradise, Jackson's "vintage synth-pop magnificence [...] has warmed into the sort of electro-disco drama you imagine the Daft Punk robots blasting as they cruise down Highway 1", adding that the album "suggests Jackson's in for the long haul." Heather Phares of AllMusic found that Jackson "downplays the stiff electronics that made such an intriguing contrast with her emotive singing and lyrics on La Roux", and opined that the album "proves Jackson is still better than many of her contemporaries when it comes to making fizzy electro-pop." Billboard's Jason Lipshutz described Trouble in Paradise as "a lavish, enjoyable, but unspectacular album that dares to change course instead of furthering La Roux's revolutions", dubbing it "a welcome, long-awaited return after a troubled hiatus, but it hums along comfortably without striking any innovative poses." Despite criticising some of the material as "shallow" and "transparent", Dave Hanratty of Drowned in Sound expressed that "La Roux returns on its own terms, with at least five minutes and 40 seconds that capture tremendous artistic growth and expression ['Let Me Down Gently']." Pitchfork's Mike Powell disliked the album's lack of surprise, commenting, "For all Jackson's personal struggle and exploration, Paradise feels like a safe record, calibrated for the comfort of an imagined audience, working at its best when it becomes almost invisible—the accessory to the experience and not the experience itself." Kevin Liedel of Slant Magazine characterised Trouble in Paradise as "a much more balanced and consistent effort" than La Roux, but felt that "[w]hen Trouble in Paradise loses its way, it's because Jackson has traded in her frigid allure and commanding bellicosity for frailty and soft-heartedness, sentiments she doesn't deliver with any sort of sincerity."

=== Accolades ===
Accolades for Trouble in Paradise
Publication	Accolade	Rank	Ref.
The Daily Telegraph	Best 50 Albums of 2014	23	
Digital Spy	Best Albums of the Year	4	
The Guardian	The Best Albums of 2014	6	
musicOMH	Top 100 Albums of 2014	15	
NME	Top 50 Albums of 2014	6	
Q	Top 50 Albums of 2014	48	
Rolling Stone	20 Best Pop Albums of 2014	13	
Time Out London	The 30 Best Albums of 2014	1	
Uncut	The Top 75 Albums of the Year	36	

== Commercial performance ==
Trouble in Paradise debuted at number six on the UK Albums Chart, selling 8,391 copies in its first week. The following week, it fell to number 43 with 2,302 copies sold. In the United States, the album debuted at number 20 on the Billboard 200 where it spent one week on the chart; however, the album peaked at number one on the Dance/Electronic Albums chart, with first-week sales of 12,000 copies. Elsewhere, the album reached the top 15 in Canada and Ireland, the top 20 in Belgium and Switzerland, and the top 30 in Australia and Denmark.

== Track listing ==
All tracks produced by Ian Sherwin and Elly Jackson, except where noted.

No.	Title	Writer(s)	Producer(s)	Length
1.	"Uptight Downtown"	Jackson; Sherwin; Ben Langmaid		4:22
2.	"Kiss and Not Tell"	Jackson; Sherwin; Langmaid; Darren Berry		3:53
3.	"Cruel Sexuality"	Jackson; Al Shux	Sherwin; Jackson; Shux^{[a]}	4:15
4.	"Paradise Is You"	Jackson; Langmaid; Sherwin		5:11
5.	"Sexotheque"	Jackson; Sherwin; Langmaid		4:18
6.	"Tropical Chancer"	Jackson; Sherwin; Jeff Bhasker; Grace Jones		3:31
7.	"Silent Partner"	Jackson; Sherwin		7:01
8.	"Let Me Down Gently"	Jackson; Langmaid; Sherwin		5:40
9.	"The Feeling"	Jackson	Jackson	4:06
Total length:				41:27

=== Notes ===
- ^{^[a]} signifies a co-producer

=== Sample credits ===
- "Tropical Chancer" contains a sample of the recording "My Jamaican Guy" as performed by Grace Jones, and a sample from "Stop" originally performed by B.W.H.

== Personnel ==
Credits adapted from the liner notes of Trouble in Paradise.

=== Musicians ===
- Elly Jackson – vocals, percussion (all tracks); guitar (tracks 1–3, 5–7); piano (track 1); synthesiser (tracks 1, 4); synth bass (tracks 2, 3, 5–7, 9); keyboards (tracks 2–9); LinnDrum (track 5); marimba (track 6); System 100, DMX (track 7); drums (track 9)
- Ian Sherwin – bass guitar, drum programming (tracks 1–8); percussion (tracks 1, 3, 4); synthesiser (track 4); System 100 (track 7); additional programming (track 9)
- Ed Seed – pick guitar (track 1)
- Steve White – live drums (track 1); drums (track 8)
- William Bowerman – clash hats (track 1)
- Tim Baxter – piano (track 1)
- Darren Berry – drum machine (track 2)
- Chilly Gonzales – piano (tracks 2, 4); Hammond organ (track 2); vibes (track 4)
- Al Shux – keyboards, space guitar (track 3)
- Aleysha Lei – background vocals (track 5)
- Hannah Khemoh – background vocals (track 5)

=== Technical ===
- Ian Sherwin – production (tracks 1–8); engineering, mixing (all tracks)
- Elly Jackson – production, mixing (all tracks); engineering (track 9)
- Ben Langmaid – engineering (tracks 2, 4, 8)
- Al Shux – co-production, engineering (track 3)
- Alan Moulder – mixing
- John Catlin – mixing assistance
- Caesar Edmunds – mixing assistance
- John Dent – mastering

=== Artwork ===
- Louis Banks – photography
- Roger Dekker – photography
- Alexander Brown – design, art direction
- Elly Jackson – design, art direction

== Charts ==
Chart performance for Trouble in Paradise
Chart (2014)	Peak position
Australian Albums (ARIA)	28
Austrian Albums (Ö3 Austria)	50
Belgian Albums (Ultratop Flanders)	19
Belgian Albums (Ultratop Wallonia)	33
Canadian Albums (Billboard)	13
Danish Albums (Hitlisten)	27
Dutch Albums (Album Top 100)	48
French Albums (SNEP)	53
German Albums (Offizielle Top 100)	33
Greek Albums (IFPI)	68
Irish Albums (IRMA)	15
Norwegian Albums (VG-lista)	38
Polish Albums (ZPAV)	44
Scottish Albums (Official Charts)	13
Spanish Albums (Promusicae)	70
Swiss Albums (Schweizer Hitparade)	17
UK Albums (Official Charts)	6
US Billboard 200	20
US Top Dance Albums (Billboard)	1

== Release history ==
Release dates and formats for Trouble in Paradise
Region	Date	Format	Label	Ref(s)
Australia	18 July 2014	CD; digital download	Universal	
Germany	18 July 2014	CD; LP; digital download	Universal	
Netherlands	18 July 2014	CD; LP; digital download	Universal	
Ireland	18 July 2014	CD; LP; digital download	Polydor	
United Kingdom	21 July 2014	CD; LP; digital download	Polydor	
France	21 July 2014	CD; LP; digital download	Universal	
Canada	22 July 2014	CD; LP; digital download	Universal	
United States	22 July 2014	CD; LP; digital download	Cherrytree; Interscope	
Japan	23 July 2014	Digital download	Universal	

== See also ==
- List of 2014 albums
- List of Billboard number-one electronic albums of 2014
- List of UK top-ten albums in 2014
