= Uptight Downtown =

Single by La Roux

from the album Trouble in Paradise
- Released: 28 May 2014
- Genre: Electropop · new wave
- Length: 4:22
- Label: Polydor
- Songwriters: Elly Jackson; Ian Sherwin; Ben Langmaid
- Producers: Ian Sherwin; Elly Jackson

La Roux singles chronology
| "I'm Not Your Toy" (2009) | "Uptight Downtown" (2014) | "Kiss and Not Tell" (2014) |

Music video
- "La Roux - Uptight Downtown (official audio)" on YouTube

"Uptight Downtown" is a song by English singer Elly Jackson, known professionally as La Roux, from her second studio album, Trouble in Paradise (2014). It was written and produced by Jackson and Ian Sherwin, with additional writing from Ben Langmaid. The song premiered on Zane Lowe's BBC Radio 1 show on 27 May 2014, and was released as the album's lead single the following day. La Roux performed the track on Good Morning America on 11 June 2014.

== Background and writing ==
Jackson wrote "Uptight Downtown" loosely about the London riots of August 2011. "The recent Brixton riots had nowhere near as much positive impact as the ones in the '80s, which we were far more directed [at the police]", she told NME in June 2014. "I'm not making any political points here and I always want to stay away from politics, so that song is about the feeling of the riots—the energy in Brixton at the time—and the fact that I had never seen my generation in London stand up for anything before. Whether it was right or not to riot, or whether anything changed, is not for me to say, but I knew afterwards that I wanted to write a song called 'Uptight Downtown'."

"Uptight Downtown" was one of the five songs that Jackson's former La Roux bandmate Ben Langmaid co-wrote on Trouble in Paradise, following his departure from the duo in February 2012.

== Critical reception ==
"Uptight Downtown" received positive reviews from music critics. Ben Hewitt of Digital Spy described the track as "electro-pop magic, with its shimmering, Chic-like guitars and taut backdrop." Robbie Daw of Idolator called it "a frenetic pop gem with a slinky bass, reverb-filled synth riffs and Jackson's trademark layered vocals." Michelle Geslani of Consequence of Sound praised "Uptight Downtown" as "[a]n impressive marrying of modern electro-pop and '70s disco flair".

Aimee Cliff of Fact magazine wrote that the song's "soaring falsetto chorus and funky propulsive rhythm show Jackson's as much on a bulletproof mission as ever." Although Max Cussons of Contactmusic.com found the lyrics unimpressing and felt that the song "doesn't tread new ground in the [disco] genre", he stated that the song "proves Jackson's unmistakable vocals are capable of being sassy and fun as well as soulful and emotional", and opined that it "serves as an indicator for Trouble In Paradise to be a promising album that will be well worth the five year wait."

== Commercial performance ==
"Uptight Downtown" debuted at number 63 on the UK Singles Chart, selling 5,740 copies in its first week.

== Track listings ==
- Digital download and UK limited-edition 12-inch single
1. "Uptight Downtown" – 4:22
- Digital download – Cherry Cherry Boom Boom Remix
1. "Uptight Downtown" (Cherry Cherry Boom Boom Remix) – 3:21
- HMV exclusive CD single
1. "Uptight Downtown" – 4:22
2. "Uptight Downtown" (Midnight Magic Remix) – 7:47
3. "Uptight Downtown" (Cherry Cherry Boom Boom Remix) – 3:23

== Credits and personnel ==
Credits adapted from the liner notes of Trouble in Paradise.

- Ian Sherwin – production, engineering, bass guitar, drum programming, percussion, mixing
- Elly Jackson – production, vocals, guitar, piano, synthesiser, percussion, mixing
- Ed Seed – pick guitar
- Steve White – live drums
- William Bowerman – clash hats
- Tim Baxter – piano
- Alan Moulder – mixing
- John Catlin – mixing assistance
- Caesar Edmunds – mixing assistance
- John Dent – mastering

== Charts ==
Weekly chart performance for "Uptight Downtown"
| Chart (2014) | Peak position |
|---|---|
| Belgium (Ultratip Bubbling Under Flanders) | 4 |
| Belgium (Ultratip Bubbling Under Wallonia) | 10 |
| Finland Airplay (Radiosoittolista) | 95 |
| Poland (Dance Top 50) | 40 |
| Scotland Singles (OCC) | 50 |
| UK Singles (OCC) | 63 |
| US Hot Dance/Electronic Songs (Billboard) | 29 |

== Release history ==
| Region | Date | Format | Version | Label | Ref. |
|---|---|---|---|---|---|
| Germany | 28 May 2014 | Digital download | Original | Universal | |
| Australia | 29 May 2014 | Digital download | Original | Universal | |
| France | 29 May 2014 | Digital download | Original | Universal | |
| United States | 3 June 2014 | Digital download | Original | Cherrytree; Interscope | |
| United States | 15 July 2014 | Digital download | Cherry Cherry Boom Boom Remix | Cherrytree; Interscope | |
| Ireland | 18 July 2014 | Digital download | Original | Polydor | |
| United Kingdom | 21 July 2014 | CD single; 12-inch single; digital download | Original | Polydor | |
