= Tropical Chancer =

Promotional single by La Roux

from the album Trouble in Paradise
- A-side: "Kiss and Not Tell"
- Released: 9 June 2014
- Genre: Disco; electro; calypso
- Length: 3:31
- Label: Polydor
- Songwriters: Elly Jackson; Ian Sherwin; Jeff Bhasker
- Producers: Ian Sherwin; Elly Jackson

Audio video
- "La Roux - Tropical Chancer (official audio)" on YouTube

"Tropical Chancer" is a 2014 song by English singer Elly Jackson, known professionally as La Roux, from her second studio album, Trouble in Paradise. It was written by Jackson, Ian Sherwin and Jeff Bhasker, and samples the song "My Jamaican Guy" written and performed by Grace Jones. "Tropical Chancer" was released as the album's second promotional single on 9 June 2014.

== Background ==
"Tropical Chancer" was written by Elly Jackson, Ian Sherwin and Jeff Bhasker, and produced by Sherwin and Jackson. It contains a sample of "My Jamaican Guy" as written and performed by Grace Jones, who is credited as one of the co-writers, as well as a sample from "Stop" originally performed by B.W.H., an Italian project fronted by Stefano Zito. "Tropical Chancer" is a disco and electro-calypso track that incorporates elements of reggae and dancehall, set against a Nile Rodgers-inspired funk guitar and echoing steel drums. The song tells the story of a Caribbean wide boy that Jackson has known for many years, whom she describes as the tropical version of Del Boy, a character from the British sitcom Only Fools and Horses played by David Jason.

The song was made available to stream online as the second promotional single from Trouble in Paradise on 9 June 2014. It was also available as an instant download with the pre-order of the album and was later released as the B-side of the "Kiss and Not Tell" seven-inch vinyl single.

== Credits and personnel ==
Credits adapted from the liner notes of Trouble in Paradise.

- Ian Sherwin – production, engineering, bass guitar, drum programming, mixing
- Elly Jackson – production, vocals, guitar, synth bass, keyboards, marimba, percussion, mixing
- Alan Moulder – mixing
- John Catlin – mixing assistance
- Caesar Edmunds – mixing assistance
- John Dent – mastering

== Charts ==
Chart (2014)	Peak position
France (SNEP)	162

== Release history ==
Region	Date	Format	Label	Ref.
Various	12 May 2014	Digital download	Polydor	
