= Supervision (album) =

Studio album by La Roux
- Released: 7 February 2020
- Recorded: 2018–2019
- Genres: Synth-pop; dance-pop
- Length: 41:47
- Label: Supercolour
- Producers: Elly Jackson; Dan Carey

La Roux chronology
Trouble in Paradise (2014)	Supervision (2020)	Old Flames (2026)

Singles from Supervision
- 1. "International Woman of Leisure" Released: 31 October 2019; 2. "Gullible Fool" Released: 5 December 2019; 3. "Automatic Driver" Released: 24 January 2020

Supervision is the third studio album by English singer Elly Jackson, known professionally as La Roux. It was released on 7 February 2020 through Jackson's own independent label Supercolour Records. It is her first album recorded entirely as a solo act, following 2014's Trouble in Paradise, on which former member Ben Langmaid still contributed to a number of songs. Musically, Supervision continued the style of the preceding album, exploring the music of the 1980s and referencing funk and disco.

The album was met with mixed to positive reviews upon its release. Some critics praised its musical direction and production while others critically reflected on its repetitiveness. The record achieved only moderate commercial success, reaching no. 20 in the UK and no. 85 in Germany. Supervision was preceded by three singles: "International Woman of Leisure", "Gullible Fool", and "Automatic Driver", but none of them made an impact on the charts.

== Background and recording ==
In spring 2015, Jackson announced that she had begun working on the third La Roux album and that she wanted it to be "futuristic and innovative". Later that year, the singer revealed that she intended to give it a "more earthy, more organic [and] more soulful" sound. In August 2015, Elly shared that she was already working with "a lot" of material and that she wanted the new album to be "even warmer [than the previous record], very energetic and quite loose". In early 2016, she confirmed that working on the album was "coming along nicely".

At the end of 2017, the singer experienced a panic attack while on holiday with her long-term partner and subsequently ended the 10-year relationship. Around the same time, Jackson realised that she was repeating the same negative patterns she had previously adopted when making music. The working relationship she had with her then-collaborator started to impact the recording process in a negative way and slow it down. Eventually, three years into making the album, she decided to scrap the largely finished project. The singer explained that the process "started to take a long time, which wasn't in my control, and I felt it didn't represent the person I was after coming out of all the relationships ending — anxiety around my voice, lacking confidence". She did not like that the album was becoming "too collaborative" and "co-controlled" again.

Jackson started working on the album from the beginning on her own and composed brand new material in four months in the first half of 2018. Majority of it was written between February and April, and recorded by August 2018. The first two songs written for the final version of the album were "Do You Feel" and "Automatic Driver". The new material was created in Jackson's own studio at her house in South London's Brixton/Herne Hill area and each song reportedly took five hours to record. Jackson only worked with a guitar, a bass and a computer, and found it beneficial to have limited equipment. She later described working in solitude as "freeing" and described the making of the album as "very cathartic" and "a joy from start to finish". The album was produced by Jackson herself and Dan Carey, whom she had known since recording sessions for the first La Roux album. The last mixes took place in the summer of 2019, before the material was mastered at Abbey Road Studios.

== Composition, style and lyrics ==
Jackson was committed to keeping the album's running time within the standard length of an LP record, between 40 and 48 minutes, which resulted from her distaste for long music albums. In March 2019, she revealed that the album would consist of nine tracks, but eventually it ended up having eight, after a song called "People Around Here" was excluded from the track list.

Supervision is a synthpop and dance-pop album that incorporates funk, reggae, disco, house, britpop, and sophisti-pop. It retains the 1980s-inspired sound of Jackson's previous works, adding influences from the 1970s and the 1990s, and taking "a more groove-based approach". The critics noted references to the music of such artists as George Michael, Nile Rodgers and Michael Jackson. Jackson explained that the album's title has a double meaning and indicates that she "can literally see clearly now" and that she does not need supervision as an artist anymore.

"Do You Feel" is about Elly's longtime friend, keyboardist Mickey O'Brien, who has been supportive of her during hard times. Jackson explained that it is "a security blanket song for her when I can't be there. And (...) a song about everybody else who maybe needs somebody to be there. I guess it's a song to make you feel less alone". "Automatic Driver" is about being in a relationship and realising that things are not going right anymore. Jackson said that the song "is about finding out who in a relationship is on autopilot. In our case, it turns out it was both of us".

The album's closing track, "Gullible Fool", has been described by Elly as the "song [she's] needed to write [her] entire life" and "the most special and meaningful song on the record". She said that it "encapsulates a cycle of a life, (...) describes the feeling of being overly trusting, and living under the assumption that you shouldn't need to protect yourself if you are nice to people. [It] covers several times in my life when I've been bullied and it's taken me totally by surprise, and then moves into the build of the inner fortress to a place of safety and joy".

== Release and promotion ==
In mid-October 2019, the album's title, tracklist and release date emerged on a number of online music retailers, although no official announcement had been made. On 30 October 2019, Jackson posted a teaser of the upcoming lead single "International Woman of Leisure", which was released the following day as her first musical output in over five years. The accompanying music video was directed by Nova Dando. The singer simultaneously announced the new album and confirmed its release date. "Gullible Fool" was released as the second single on 5 December 2019, along with its music video directed by Sam Bell. The third and final single, "Automatic Driver", was released on 24 January 2020, two weeks before the album. The music video, directed by Valentin Guiod, premiered on the same day. A remix of "Automatic Driver" by American rapper and producer Tyler, the Creator was released on 16 April 2020.

The album was released independently on Jackson's own Supercolour Records on 7 February 2020, licensed to distributing company Believe, after she and her previous label Polydor parted ways in 2015. Supervision was released in multiple formats and was accompanied by a special limited edition magazine which Jackson dubbed "fantazine". The singer announced that she was going to tour Europe in February and North America in March 2020 to support the album. The North American leg of the tour was postponed until November 2020, but it was eventually cancelled.

== Critical reception ==
Professional ratings
Aggregate scores
Source	Rating
AnyDecentMusic?	6.5/10
Metacritic	67/100
Review scores
Source	Rating
AllMusic	4/5 stars
Clash	6/10
Consequence of Sound	B
The Guardian	4/5 stars
The Independent	3/5 stars
Loud and Quiet	7/10
Mojo	3/5 stars
NME	3/5 stars
Q	3/5 stars
The Times	4/5 stars

Supervision received generally mixed to positive reviews from music critics. At Metacritic, which assigns a normalised rating out of 100 to reviews from mainstream publications, the album received an average score of 67, based on 13 reviews, which indicates "generally favorable reviews".

The album was praised for its "refreshingly consistent sound and (...) its focus on substance rather than style". It has been repeatedly described as "coherent", "consistent", and "infectious". The critics tended to select "International Woman of Leisure", "Gullible Fool", "Do You Feel" and "Automatic Driver" as the album's highlights. On the other hand, some reviewers also picked "Automatic Driver" as one of the worst tracks on Supervision.

In a more neutral review, Ben Devlin of musicOMH reflected that "Supervision is at times frustrating [but] also contains some of La Roux's best music to date". The Independent's Roisin O'Connor described the album as "lifeless" and "lacklustre", concluding that it is "certainly not a bad album, but it's a far cry from the bristling pop genius of Jackson's best work". Some reviewers described the record as "repetitive" and "samey", with "never enough distinction between the album's tracks" which they found sound too similar to each other. Other critics reflected that "the lack of variety", "the lack of surprise elements and adventurous sound in the music itself mars some efforts".

USA Today listed the album as the fifth best of 2020.

== Commercial performance ==
Supervision debuted at number 20 on the UK Albums Chart selling 3,347 copies. It also charted at no. 7 on the Vinyl Albums Chart, no. 3 on the Independent Albums Charts, no. 8 on the Downloads Chart, and no. 7 on the Albums Sales Chart in the UK. In Germany, it debuted at number 85.

== Track listing ==
All tracks written by Elly Jackson, and produced by Jackson and Dan Carey.

Supervision track listing
No.	Title	Length
1.	"21st Century"	4:13
2.	"Do You Feel"	5:00
3.	"Automatic Driver"	5:05
4.	"International Woman of Leisure"	4:18
5.	"Everything I Live For"	5:35
6.	"Otherside"	5:21
7.	"He Rides"	4:58
8.	"Gullible Fool"	7:17
Total length:		41:47

Notes

- "International Woman of Leisure" is billed as "I.W.O.L." on physical editions of the album.

== Personnel ==
Credits adapted from the liner notes of Supervision.

=== Musicians ===
- Elly Jackson – vocals, guitar, organ, piano, synthesizer
- Dan Carey – synthesizer, drum programming, bass
- Mari Phillips – piano
- Julian Sartorius – percussion

=== Technical ===
- Elly Jackson – production, mixing
- Dan Carey – production, mixing
- Sean Oakley – mixing
- Christian Wright – mastering

=== Artwork ===
- Elly Jackson – art direction
- Markus Bagå – design
- Mat Maitland – design, art direction, photography
- Ed Miles – photography

== Charts ==
Sales chart performance for Supervision
Chart (2020)	Peak position
French Physical Albums (SNEP)	185
German Albums (Offizielle Top 100)	85
Irish Independent Albums (IRMA)	13
Scottish Albums (Official Charts)	10
UK Albums (Official Charts)	20
UK Independent Albums (OCC)	3
US Top Current Album Sales (Billboard)	71

== Release history ==
Release formats for Supervision
Region	Date	Format	Label	Ref.
Various	7 February 2020	CD; LP; cassette; download; streaming	Supercolour	
