= Let Me Down Gently =

Promotional single by La Roux

from the album Trouble in Paradise
- Released: 12 May 2014
- Genre: Synth-pop
- Length: 5:40
- Label: Polydor
- Songwriter(s): Elly Jackson; Ben Langmaid; Ian Sherwin
- Producer(s): Ian Sherwin; Elly Jackson

Music video
- "Let Me Down Gently" on YouTube

"Let Me Down Gently" is a 2014 song by English singer Elly Jackson, known professionally as La Roux, from her second studio album, Trouble in Paradise. It was written and produced by Jackson, Ben Langmaid and Ian Sherwin, and produced by Sherwin and Jackson. The song was released as the album's first promotional single on 12 May 2014. La Roux performed it as the opening track on the Trouble in Paradise tour.

== Background ==
"Let Me Down Gently" was written by Elly Jackson, Ben Langmaid and Ian Sherwin, and produced by Sherwin and Jackson. It is a synth-pop ballad, opening with a "steady electronic beat", which builds up towards a brief moment of silence, followed by a "euphoric, cathartic barnstormer, complete with skyscraping sax solo" at the end of the track. Billboard noted that "the track expertly raises in intensity until abruptly shutting off". The song's lyrics tell about a relationship breakup, and Jackson delivers them in vocals described as "pained and aloof".

"Let Me Down Gently" premiered on Zane Lowe's BBC Radio 1 show on 12 May 2014 and was made available to stream online on the same day. The track was also available as an instant download with the pre-order of Trouble in Paradise. The song received positive feedback from music critics.

Prins Thomas and George FitzGerald produced remixes of the song which were uploaded onto La Roux's official SoundCloud page, but were never released on other platforms.

== Music video ==
The music video for the song was directed by Oliver Hadlee Pearch. It begins with Elly performing the first part of the song sitting in a grey dark room, with a stream of light coming through the only window in the ceiling. The second part of the video pictures the singer running through foggy fields, occasionally interspersed with footage of her dancing in the grey room.

== Track listing ==
- Download/streaming
1. "Let Me Down Gently" – 5:40

== Credits and personnel ==
Credits adapted from the liner notes of Trouble in Paradise.

- Ian Sherwin – production, engineering, bass guitar, drum programming, mixing
- Elly Jackson – production, vocals, keyboards, percussion, mixing
- Ben Langmaid – engineering
- Steve White – drums
- Alan Moulder – mixing
- John Catlin – mixing assistance
- Caesar Edmunds – mixing assistance
- John Dent – mastering

== Charts ==
Chart (2014)	Peak position
UK Singles (Official Charts Company)	194

== Release history ==
Region	Date	Format	Label	Ref.
Various	12 May 2014	Digital download	Polydor	
