= Mother (Kubb album) =

Studio album by Kubb
- Released: 14 November 2005
- Recorded: Olympic Studios, London
- Genre: Pop, alternative rock
- Length: 47:24
- Label: Mercury
- Producer: Martin "Youth" Glover

Singles from Mother
- 1. "Somebody Else" / "Alcatraz" Released: 30 May 2005; 2. "Remain" Released: 22 August 2005; 3. "Wicked Soul" Released: 7 November 2005; 4. "Grow" Released: 6 February 2006; 5. "Remain" Released: 1 May 2006 (re-issue)

Professional ratings
Review scores
Source	Rating
AllMusic	link

Mother is the only album of British band Kubb. It was released on 14 November 2005 in the UK on the Mercury Records label. It reached a peak of 26 the week of 13 February 2006. The album was never released in the US, although some versions have surfaced stateside (these versions removed the track "Bitch", bringing the album down to 11 tracks).

== Track listing ==
1. "Remain" – 3:36
2. "I Don't Mind" – 3:49
3. "Somebody Else" – 2:54
4. "Wicked Soul" – 3:46
5. "Grow" – 5:13
6. "If I Can't Have You" – 3:26
7. "Alcatraz" – 3:18
8. "Chemical" – 6:06
9. "Sun" – 3:10
10. "Without You" – 3:56
11. "Bitch" – 3:37
12. "Burn Again" – 4:32

== B-sides ==
Arranged in order of single release.

- "Lady Nightmare"
- "Bus Stop"
- "Remain" (Youth edit)
- "Mother"
- "Somebody Else" (Live XFM Session)
- "Wicked Soul" (acoustic)
- "Wicked Soul" (live at V Festival)
- "Lucille"
- "Come Inside"
- "Wicked Soul" (Tim Bran Remix)
- "Chemical" (live at Brixton)
- "For Us"
- "Connection"
- "Thursday"
