= Mickey O'Brien =

English musician

- Origin: London, England
- Genres: Classical; synth-pop; experimental rock
- Occupations: Composer, musician, radio presenter
- Instruments: Piano, flute, keyboards, drums
- Formerly of: La Roux

Mickey "Beans" O'Brien is an English composer and musician.

== Early life ==
O'Brien was raised in an Irish Catholic family in Wandsworth, South London. She started playing piano at the age of eight, learning to play through genres such as classical, swing and ragtime.

O'Brien is a classically trained pianist and flutist, but she is also a self-trained composer and arranger.

While studying for a degree from King's College London, she also spent time playing with Past Caring and was part of the squat gig scene with The Libertines, The Others and Left Hand. O'Brien also worked in a vintage shop in Camden Market where many of her peers were musicians from the early 2000s Camden scene.

== Career ==
=== La Roux ===
O' Brien is the only original touring member of La Roux since 2008 and has toured the world playing numerous gigs, including Glastonbury and Coachella. She and bandmate Elly Jackson met when her sister recommended O'Brien as a keyboardist. O'Brien was in the band Ali Love, but they disbanded and O'Brien joined Jackson. They have remained very good friends ever since.

=== Acting ===
She had a brief role as a burger seller in Mat Whitecross' Spike Island, a film about The Stone Roses because she cites The Stone Roses as one of her favourite bands. She was in a scene with her ex-boyfriend Jim Sturgess.

=== Radio presenter ===
O'Brien's extensive knowledge and opinions on music as well as friendly handling of guests, won her a show Boogaloo Radio after being a guest on John Brices' Boogaloo Show commemorating the death of Mark E. Smith of The Fall.

Every Monday from 4:00 pm to 6:00 pm; O'Brien hosts her own radio show live on Boogaloo Radio called Beans on Boogaloo. Her style is informal and friendly, and she chats with guests whilst playing music. Her past guests have included Alan McGee, Ian Broudie, Mark Collins from The Charlatans, and Elly Jackson, her friend and bandmate from La Roux.

=== Panelist/Mentor ===
Currently she is a panelist on CirKT a Mayor Of London run program encouraging musicians and grassroots venues to flourish in London. She appeared on London Live on 4 March with organizer Anna Doyle to promote the program.

== Compositions ==
Her work of note includes composing the score for Paul Sng's film documentary Dispossession: The Great Social Housing Swindle. This was aired on Channel 5 under the title: Social Housing, Social Cleansing.

O'Brien also provided the title music for the trailer of the launch of the book: Invisible Britain: Portraits of Hope and Resilience.

Currently O'Brien is composing the score for the documentary Theodore and working on music for a documentary on X-Ray Spex' seminal singer, Poly Styrene: I Am A Cliche.

In January 2019, O'Brien composed a piece of music for British designer Edward Crutchley for his show at the Truman Brewery during London Fashion Week.

== Performances ==
O'Brien plays very few solo gigs. However; she has collaborated with The Preservation Room on a few occasions and throughout 2015/2016 played gigs for the creator John Kye. She also played for a fundraising gig in Dalston for Poly Styrene, and another charity gig at The Windmill Brixton organised by prolific producer and musician Dan Carey. In July 2018 she played a gig at The Phoenix Arts Bar in Soho.
