= Alexander Brown (director) =

British music video director

Alexander Brown is an English music video director and album cover designer.

Brown's design for La Roux's debut album cover was named one of the best of 2009.

He won the 2006 Yahoo! Sharpener Award for final year university design students, during his final year at Goldsmiths College.

Brown's design for Maribou State's 2018 album, Kingdoms in Colour, was featured in Creative Review's 'Best Record Sleeves of the Year'.

== Music video filmography ==
- Owl City - "Umbrella Beach"
- Tinashé - "Mayday"
- Goldhawks - "Running Away"
- The Maccabees - "No Kind Words"
- The Maccabees - "Empty Vessels"' feat Roots Manuva
- Stornoway - "Zorbing"
- James Blake - "The Wilhelm Scream"
- Gabrielle Aplin - The Power of Love
- La Roux - "Kiss And Not Tell"
- James Blake - "If The Car Beside You Moves Ahead"
