= La Roux =

English synth-pop act

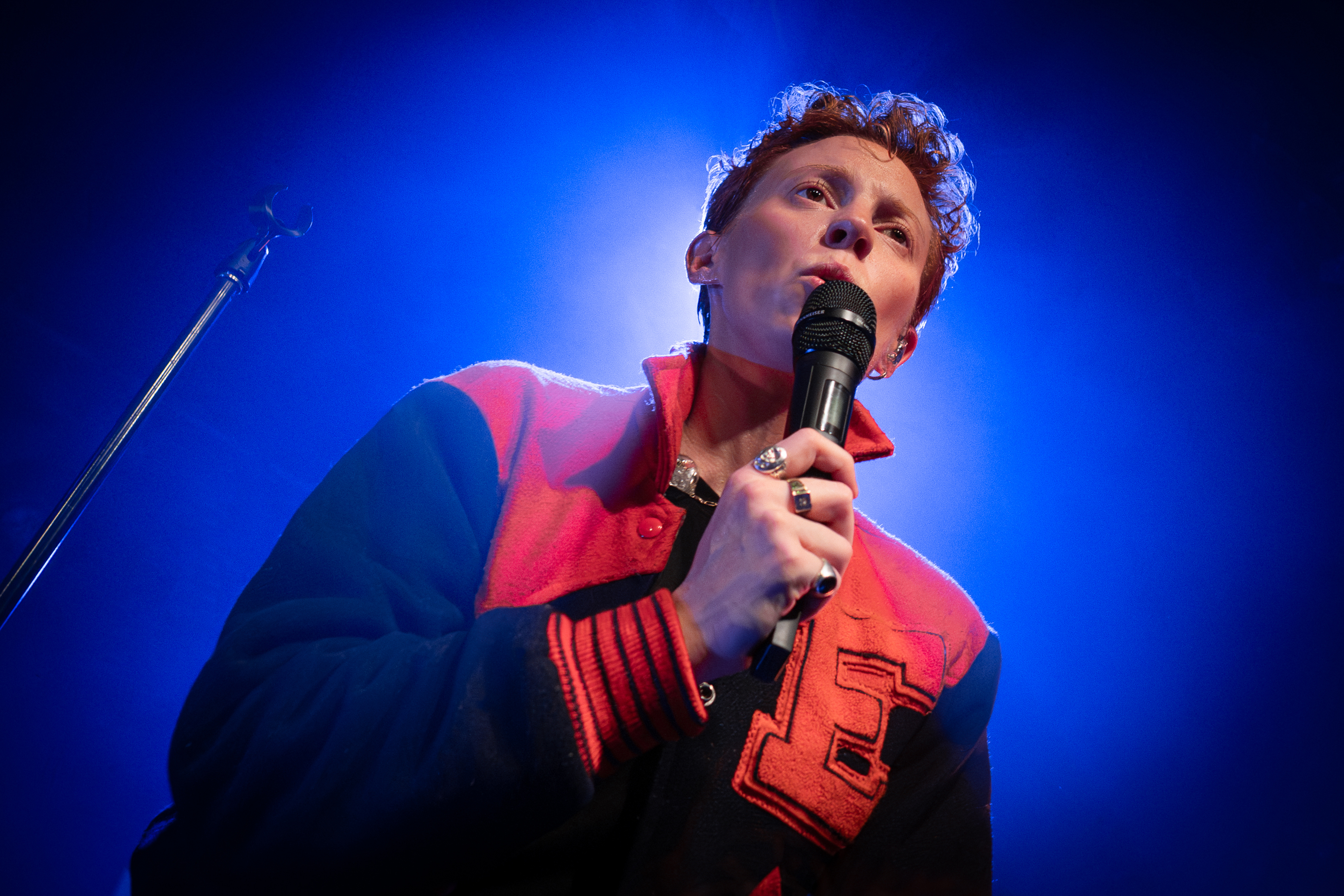
- La Roux performing in Los Angeles, 2025

Background information
- Origin: London, England
- Genres: Synth-pop; new wave
- Years active: 2008–present
- Labels: Kitsuné; Polydor; Cherrytree; Interscope; Supercolour; Vertigo; Universal
- Members: Elly Jackson
- Past members: Ben Langmaid
- Website: laroux.co.uk

La Roux (/lɑːˈruː/ lah-ROO) is an English synth-pop act formed in 2008 by singer Elly Jackson and record producer Ben Langmaid. The act's debut album La Roux (2009) was a critical and commercial success, winning a Grammy Award for Best Dance/Electronic Album and producing hit singles such as "In for the Kill" and "Bulletproof". Recording of a follow-up album was marred by unsuccessful collaborations, the cancellation of two planned release dates, and reported conflict between the duo.

Langmaid ultimately left the group in 2012, and Jackson released a second album, Trouble in Paradise, in 2014, maintaining the former duo's name as her stage persona. The album was a critical, but not a commercial, success, and La Roux subsequently parted ways with Polydor Records. She released her third album, Supervision, independently in 2020. Her fourth album, Old Flames, was released on 6 November 2026.

== History ==
=== 2006–2011: Beginnings and self-titled album ===
Elly Jackson and Ben Langmaid were introduced by a mutual friend in 2006. Initially, they performed acoustic music under the moniker Automan, before shifting to electronic music. The band's name was changed to La Roux, which referred to both the act and Jackson's stage persona; the name alludes to the singer's red hair and tomboyish appearance, mingling the masculine ("le roux") and feminine ("la rousse") French terms.

La Roux's debut single, "Quicksand", was released by French independent record label Kitsuné in December 2008 to minor chart success. The duo then signed to Polydor Records in order to release an album. The second single, "In for the Kill", was released on 16 March 2009 and subsequently remixed by two prominent dubstep producers, Skream and Skrillex. "In for the Kill" debuted at number 11 on the UK singles chart on 22 March 2009, peaking at number 2 four weeks later. "Bulletproof", their third single, was released on 21 June 2009 and debuted at number 1 on the UK singles chart. The song also topped the Hot Dance Club Songs chart, peaked at number 8 on the Billboard Hot 100, and went on to sell over 2 million copies in the United States. The band's debut album, La Roux, was released on 26 June 2009 to generally favourable reviews. It peaked at number 2 in the UK and number 70 on the Billboard 200, among others. The fourth single, "I'm Not Your Toy", was released on 29 September 2009 and reached number 27 on the UK chart. "As If by Magic" and "Tigerlily" were mooted as next singles, but the release plans were later cancelled.

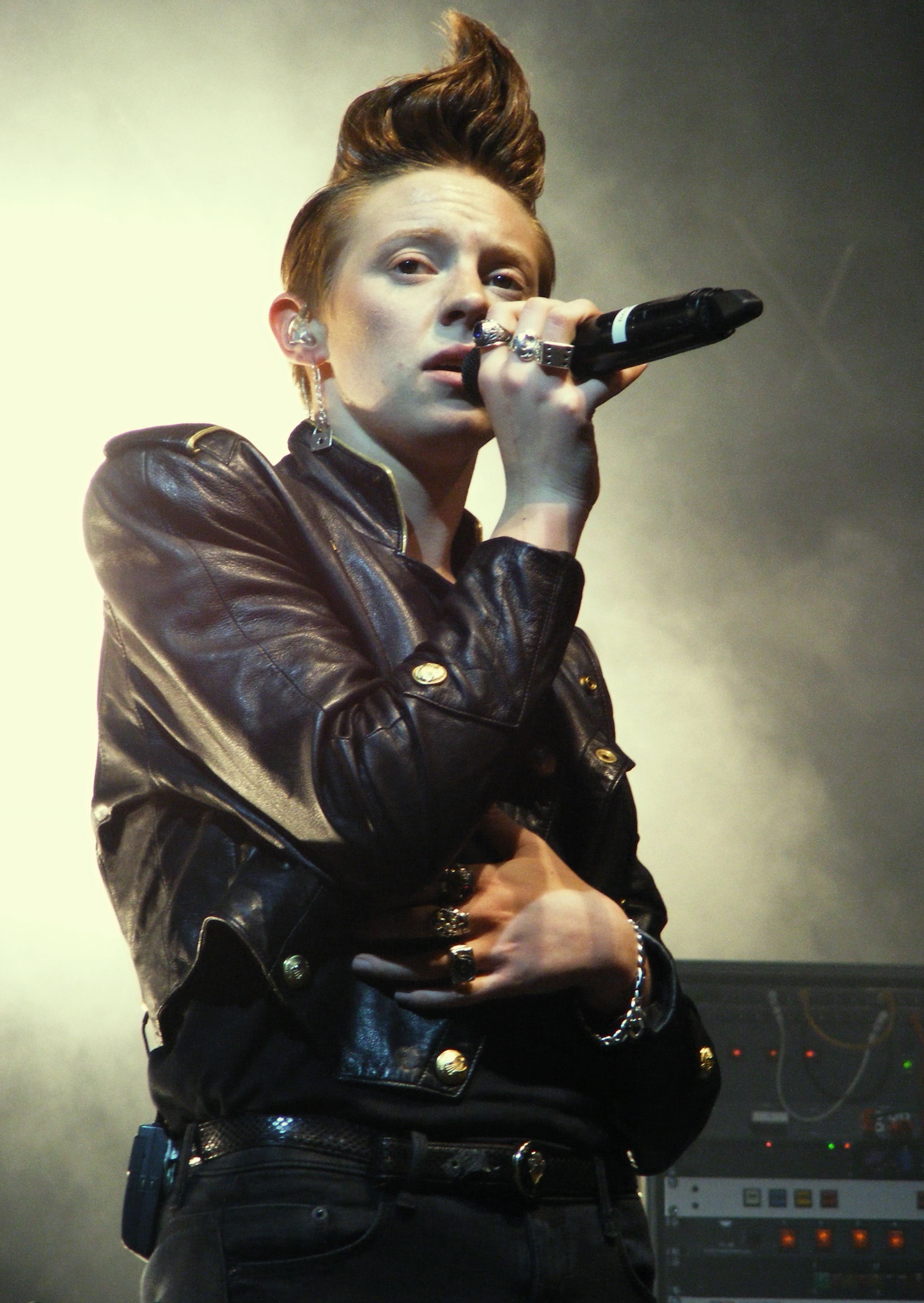
Elly Jackson performing at Piccadilly Gardens in Manchester, 2010

In order to promote La Roux, the band was the supporting act on Lily Allen's UK tour of March 2009. La Roux then headlined the NME Radar Tour alongside Magistrates and Heartbreak, performed at the Glastonbury and Reading and Leeds festivals as well as London's Scala. In July and August 2009, La Roux toured North America. The eight-city tour included performances at Osheaga Festival, All Points West Music & Arts Festival and Lollapalooza. The group returned to North America for a seven-date tour in October. Their two Australian dates sold out within minutes forcing an upgrade in venues. In November, the duo embarked on an eleven-date UK and Ireland tour. La Roux gained fifth position on the BBC Sound of 2009 poll. The Guardian website featured La Roux on the New Band of the Day column, having previously featured them as one of the Best New Acts of 2009. The album has been nominated for a Mercury Prize, and was eventually certified platinum in the UK and Ireland, and gold in Australia.

Sales of "In for the Kill" spiked 600 per cent when Skream's "Let's Get Ravey" remix of the song appeared on the HBO show Entourage in August 2010. A remix EP of the song was released in tandem with the November US tour. In October, a new music video for the song was released, shot at New York's landmark Hotel Chelsea. Also in 2010, Jackson contributed vocals to Kanye West's album My Beautiful Dark Twisted Fantasy and to West and Jay-Z's collaborative album Watch the Throne, on the track "That's My Bitch". She also performed on Chromeo's third album Business Casual, providing chorus vocals for the track "Hot Mess" which was released as a single in early 2011. In February 2011, at the 53rd Annual Grammy Awards, La Roux won the Grammy Award for Best Dance/Electronic Album for their self-titled debut album and "In for the Kill" was nominated for Best Dance Recording.

=== 2012–2017: Departure of Langmaid and Trouble in Paradise ===
In a January 2012 interview, the second La Roux album was described as "a lot cheekier" and "sexier". The material, which the duo had been working on intermittently for over two years, was said to draw more on acoustic sounds and instruments. It had been reported that La Roux were writing the second album with an indie rock band whose members are friends of Jackson. Langmaid left La Roux at some point later in 2012, although his departure was officially confirmed two years later.

La Roux started a low-key comeback tour on 28 March 2013 in Brighton during which she premiered four new songs. Early reactions to the new material were positive. In April 2014, La Roux announced that her second studio album, Trouble in Paradise, would be released in the UK on 21 July. It was preceded by the song "Let Me Down Gently", which premiered on BBC Radio 1 on 12 May, and the first official single "Uptight Downtown", released on 28 May 2014. The latter was a moderate success in the UK, peaking at number 63. On 9 June, "Tropical Chancer" was released as another promotional single. During the promotions for the album, Jackson revealed that she and Langmaid had parted ways, and she was now the sole member of La Roux. Langmaid responded that he was "truly saddened" by the split. Trouble in Paradise met with favourable critical reception, but did not repeat the commercial success of the predecessor, peaking at number 6 in the UK, where it stayed on the chart for only four weeks, and failing to enter the top 10 anywhere else. "Kiss and Not Tell", released as a single on 20 October 2014, failed to make an impact on the charts.

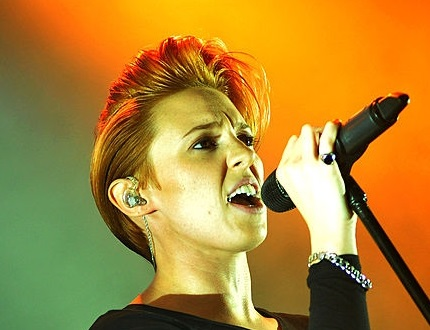
La Roux performing at Bestival in Newport, 2014

La Roux toured North America in July 2014, including two opening shows for New Order in San Francisco and Los Angeles. She then continued the tour alternating between Europe and North America, before embarking on the Australian leg at the end of the year. In early 2015, the tour proceeded to South America. La Roux then performed additional dates in Europe, including Croatia's INmusic Festival, UK's Glastonbury, and Germany's Melt! Festival. Her touring band consisted of four musicians, including keyboardist and backing vocalist Mickey O'Brien.

Jackson provided joint lead vocals for the tracks "Tutti Frutti" and "People on the High Line", along with backing vocals on "Plastic", for New Order's album Music Complete, released in September 2015. She also filmed a cameo appearance for the film Absolutely Fabulous, released the following year, in which she performed "Sexotheque" and "Uptight Downtown". In 2016, La Roux's live lineup comprised Seye Adelekan, Olugbenga Adelekan from Metronomy and Jay Sharrock from Miles Kane's band. During that time, La Roux was recording new music, but decided to scrap the entire material in 2017.

=== 2018–2023: Supervision and collaborations ===
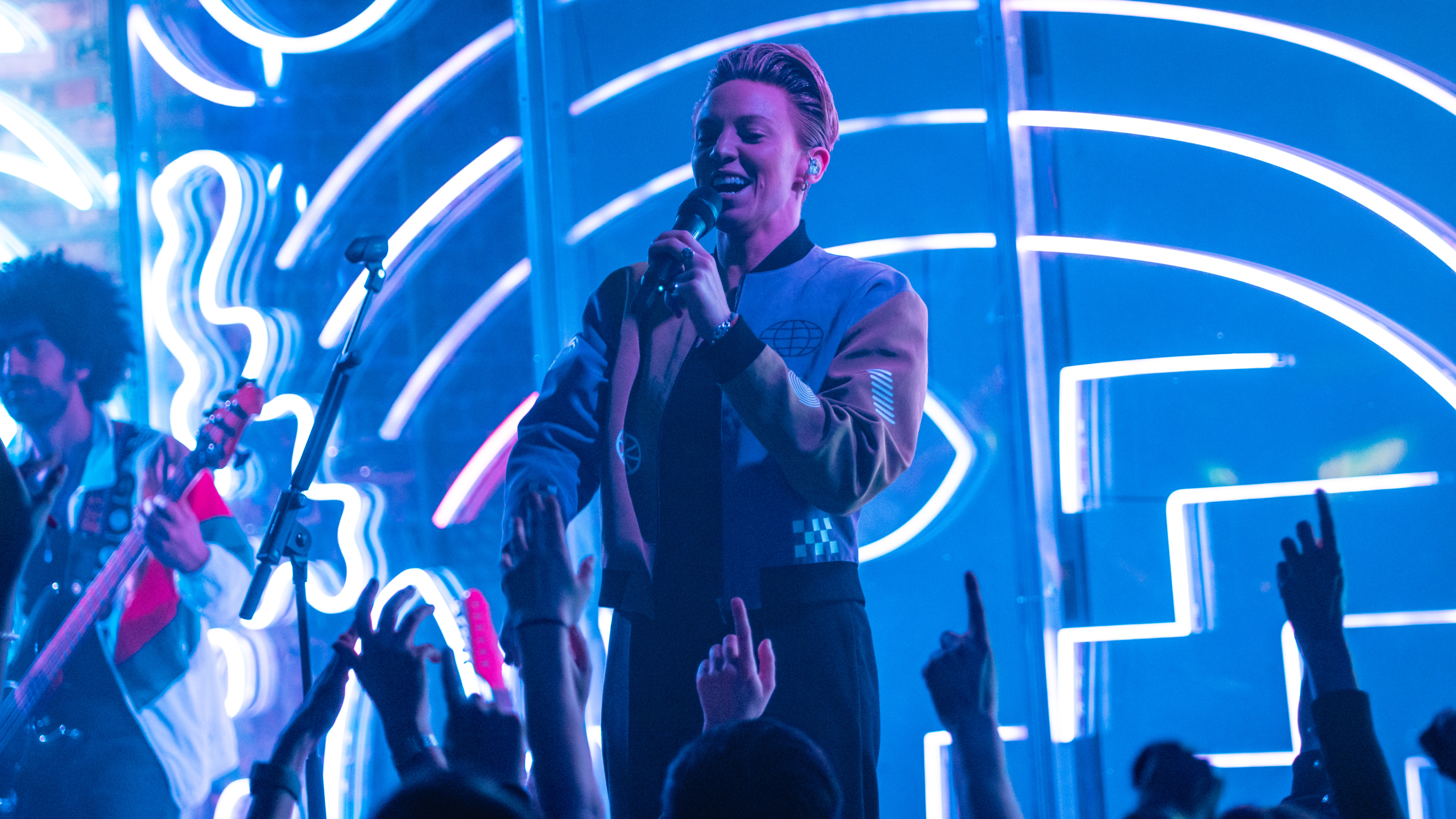
La Roux performing at Fabric in London, 2020

In 2018, La Roux provided vocals for Whyte Horses' "The Best of It". The following year, she featured on their cover of "Mr. Natural" and provided background vocals for Tyler, the Creator's track "Thank You" on his album Igor. In the meantime, she composed and recorded material for her third studio album, Supervision, which was her first made entirely as a solo act. It was released on 7 February 2020 through Jackson's own independent label Supercolour Records. The album was preceded by the singles "International Woman of Leisure" on 31 October 2019, "Gullible Fool" on 5 December 2019, and "Automatic Driver" on 23 January 2020. None of the singles made impact on the charts and the album met with mixed to positive reviews upon its release. Commercially, the record achieved only moderate success, reaching number 20 in the UK and number 85 in Germany.

La Roux announced a concert tour in Europe in February and North America in March 2020 to support Supervision, having recruited new touring musicians. The American leg of the tour was postponed until November and eventually cancelled due to the COVID-19 pandemic. La Roux collaborated with Tyler, the Creator on a remix of "Automatic Driver" and with American singer Boulevards on the single "Too Far". She also appeared in the Sky Arts documentary Blitzed: The 80's Blitz Kids Story about the cultural effects of the New Romantic movement on younger performers like herself. In 2021, she appeared on CASisDEAD's single and video "Park Assist", and on the compilation The Problem of Leisure: A Celebration of Andy Gill & Gang of Four, to which she contributed a cover of "Damaged Goods".

In 2022, UK drill rapper Tion Wayne sampled the chorus of "In for the Kill" in his single "IFTK", with La Roux billed as a co-lead artist. The track reached number 6 on the UK singles chart and number 10 in Ireland, de facto becoming La Roux's first top 10 hit in over a decade. On 26 October 2022, La Roux released the single "Feedback" featuring rapper Baby Tate. In April 2023, she featured on Chromeo's single "Replacements". The artists then collaborated on a new version of "Bulletproof", newly titled "Discoproof".

=== 2025–present: Old Flames ===
From March to May 2025, La Roux performed in the US, Paris and London, previewing new material. In May 2026, she announced her fourth album, Old Flames, which was released on 6 November 2026 via Vertigo Records and Universal Music. The album was preceded by the singles "Cabin Fever" on 7 May, "Babyline" on 26 June, and "Lose Myself" on 14 August. La Roux is supporting Hilary Duff on her worldwide Lucky Me Tour from June to October 2026.

== Artistry ==
Elly Jackson's first interest was in folk music. She was particularly interested in Carole King and Nick Drake, whose music she discovered in her parents' record collection. Jackson's early musical material consisted of folk ditties influenced by Joni Mitchell. She made her performing debut at the Half Moon Pub in Herne Hill, London, at the age of 17. Jackson established a musical relationship with Langmaid through a mutual friend, although her taste in music began to change as she became involved in the rave scene; she and Langmaid then established the electronic project La Roux. The band's influences have included 1970s and 80s artists such as Gerry Rafferty, Prince, Madonna, OMD, Depeche Mode and Eurythmics, along with 21st century acts like Jenny Wilson and The Knife.

In July 2010, La Roux curated and mixed a volume of Sidetracked, a compilation series from Renaissance that allows artists from the electronic field free rein to showcase their musical interests. The eclectic mix featured the likes of Japan, Heaven 17, Joyce Sims, Doris Troy, Tears for Fears and several more of their influences. It also includes a cover of The Rolling Stones' "Under My Thumb".

Jackson is unhappy with what she perceives as a "normality" fashion trend among a majority of today's musical acts. Her androgynous clothing and hair style has been compared to the 1980s group A Flock of Seagulls. Jackson strongly opposes stylists who try to make her appearance more classically feminine.

== Members ==
=== Elly Jackson ===
Eleanor Kate "Elly" Jackson (born 12 March 1988) is the lead singer, songwriter and sole member of La Roux, formerly a synthpop duo. She is known for her reddish toned hair and androgynous style. Her vocal range is that of a soprano. She was born in London to actors Trudie Goodwin and Kit Jackson, and has an older sister named Jessica. Jackson's great-grandfather was Anthony Bernard, founder of the London Chamber Orchestra and first musical director of the Shakespeare Memorial Theatre in Stratford-upon-Avon. Jackson attended Pimlico School, Sydenham High School, and Royal Russell School. She was frequently bullied in school because of her appearance and weight. She describes herself as gay, but has expressed discomfort with revealing her sexuality to the public. In 2026, Elly Jackson revealed that she had been diagnosed with autism.

=== Ben Langmaid ===
Paul Benedict "Ben" Langmaid (born June 1966) was a member of La Roux from its inception until 2012, as songwriter and producer. He did not participate in the music videos or live performances with Jackson.

Langmaid grew up in Twickenham, South West London as an only child, and took interest in music from an early age. He has a close association with Rollo Armstrong of Faithless; the two musicians went to the same school and later collaborated as Huff & Puff in the mid-1990s, releasing the house single "Help Me Make It" in 1996. Langmaid also recorded as Atomic and was one half of Huff & Herb, Langmaid was a DJ throughout the 1990s and has been involved with various other music projects. He contributed as a songwriter to indie rock band Kubb's debut album Mother, released in 2005. This project was again linked to Rollo Armstrong; Kubb's frontman Harry Collier was introduced to Langmaid after Collier sang "Happy Birthday to You" to Armstrong whilst working as a waiter in a North London organic café. Langmaid turned down the offer of a permanent position in Kubb. In 2011, Langmaid wrote material for the early 1990s R&B-styled girl group War of Words.

=== Touring members ===
- Michael Greene – keyboards; left the band in 2012 to release music as Fort Romeau
- Mickey O'Brien – keyboards and backing vocals (2008–2023)
- William Bowerman – percussion (2009–2016)
- Ed Seed – bass (2013–2016)
- Matthew "Matty" Carroll – bass (2013–2016)
- Seye Adelekan – bass (2016)
- Olugbenga Adelekan – bass (2016)
- Jay Sharrock – percussion (2016)
- Fernando Sanchez – bass, keyboard (2019–2020)
- Louis Sommer – bass (2020, 2025)
- Karl Bossche – percussion (2020)
- Dani Diodato – bass, keyboard (2025)

== Discography ==
- La Roux (2009)
- Trouble in Paradise (2014)
- Supervision (2020)
- Old Flames (2026)

== Awards ==
Year	Award	Category	Nominated work	Result
2009	O2 Silver Clef Awards	Best Newcomer	La Roux	Won
2009	Studio8 International Music Awards	Best Female Newcomer	Elly Jackson	Won
2009	Studio8 International Music Awards	Studio8 Song of July 2009	"Bulletproof"	Won
2009	Mercury Prize	–	La Roux	Nominated
2009	MTV Europe Music Awards	Best New Act	La Roux	Nominated
2009	MTV Europe Music Awards	Best Push Artist	La Roux	Nominated
2009	MTV Europe Music Awards	Best UK & Ireland New Act	La Roux	Nominated
2009	Žebřík Music Awards	Best International Discovery	La Roux	Nominated
2009	Virgin Media Music Awards	Best Newcomer	La Roux	Nominated
2009	Virgin Media Music Awards	Best Album	La Roux	Nominated
2009	mtvU Woodie Awards	Breaking Woodie	La Roux	Nominated
2009	Q Awards	Breakthrough Artist	La Roux	Nominated
2009	UK Festival Awards	Best Breakthrough Act	La Roux	Nominated
2009	Popjustice £20 Music Prize	5th	"In for the Kill"	Nominated
2009	The Record of the Year	7th	"In for the Kill"	Nominated
2009	UK Music Video Awards	Best Styling in a Video	"Quicksand"	Nominated
2009	iTunes 2009 UK Music Awards	Single of the Year	"In for the Kill"	Won
2009	Best Art Vinyl	Best Art Vinyl 2009	La Roux	9th
2010	Brit Awards	British Breakthrough Act	La Roux	Nominated
2010	Brit Awards	British Single	"In for the Kill"	Nominated
2010	Glamour Women of the Year Awards	Band of the Year	La Roux	Nominated
2010	Glamour Women of the Year Awards	Sheer Infusion Newcomer	La Roux	Nominated
2010	NME Awards	Best Dancefloor Filler	"In for the Kill" (Skream Remix)	Won
2010	NME Awards	Best New Band	La Roux	Nominated
2010	NME Awards	Best Dressed	Elly Jackson	Nominated
2010	Ivor Novello Awards	Best Contemporary Song	"In for the Kill"	Nominated
2010	MTV Video Music Awards Japan	Best Dance Video	"I'm Not Your Toy"	Nominated
2010	International Dance Music Awards	Best Underground Dance Track	"In for the Kill" (Skream Remix)	Nominated
2010	International Dance Music Awards	Best Alternative/Rock Dance Track	"Bulletproof"	Nominated
2010	International Dance Music Awards	Best Electro Track	"In for the Kill" (Skream Remix)	Nominated
2010	International Dance Music Awards	Best Dubstep/DNB/Jungle Track	"In for the Kill" (Skream Remix)	Won
2010	International Dance Music Awards	Best Break-Through Artist (Group)	La Roux	Won
2010	NewNowNext Awards	Brink of Fame: Music Artist	La Roux	Nominated
2011	Grammy Awards	Best Dance Recording	"In for the Kill"	Nominated
2011	Grammy Awards	Best Electronic/Dance Album	La Roux	Won
2011	Billboard Music Awards	Top Dance Artist	La Roux	Nominated
2011	BMI Pop Awards	Award-Winning Song	"Bulletproof"	Won
2014	Popjustice £20 Music Prize	Best British Pop Single	"Uptight Downtown"	Nominated
2014	Rober Awards Music Poll	Best Female Artist	La Roux	Nominated
2014	Rober Awards Music Poll	Best Pop Artist	La Roux	Nominated
2015	NME Awards	Best Album	Trouble in Paradise	Nominated
2015	NME Awards	Best Solo Act	La Roux	Nominated
2015	NME Awards	Best Fan Community	La Roux	Nominated
